= Kabardia =

Historical country in the North Caucasus

Princedom of Kabardia Къэбэрдей Пщыгъуэ (Kabardian)
- 14th-15th centuries–c. 1825
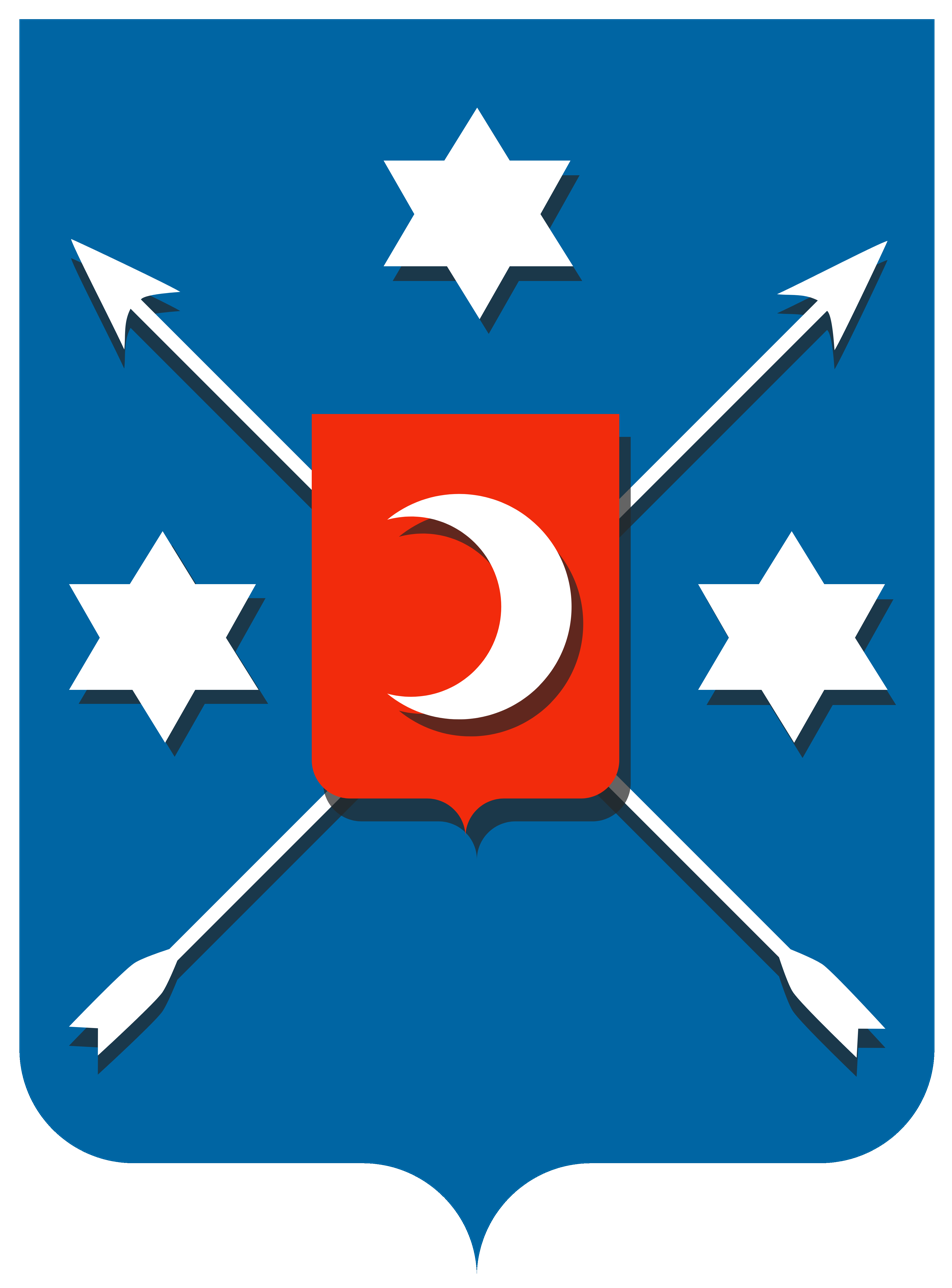
- Flag Coat of arms

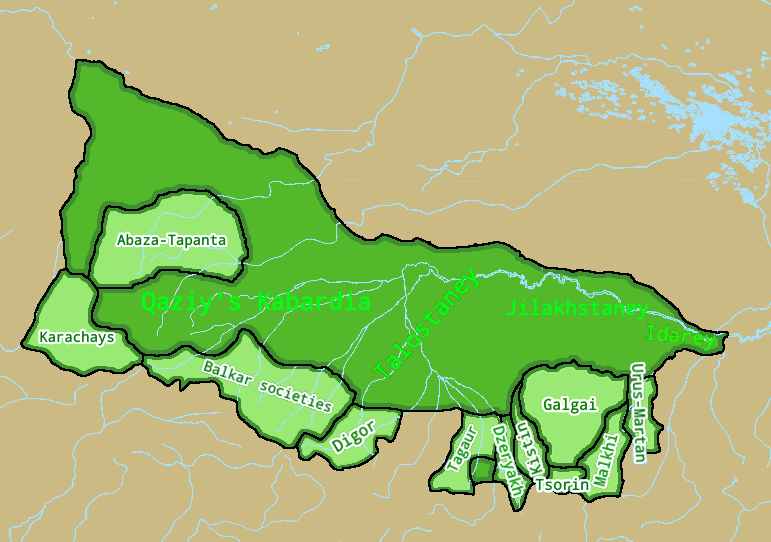
- Map of Kabardia in the first quarter of the 17th century including vassals and tributaries
- Capital: Various settlements
- Common languages: East Circassian
- Religion: Khabzeism; Orthodox Christianity; Sunni Islam
- Government: Federal Monarchy
  - Grand Prince: See Grand Prince of Kabardia
- History
  - Established: 14th-15th centuries
  - Division of Kabardia: 15th century
  - Alliance with Russia: 1557
  - Battle of Malka: 1641
  - Battle of Kanzhal: 1708
  - Foundation of Mozdok: 1763
  - Russo-Circassian War: 1763–1864
  - Seven Months' War: 1779
  - Disestablished: c. 1825

Area
  - Total: 80.000 km^{2} (30.888 sq mi)

Population
  - 1600-1650 estimate: 462,000
  - 1818 census: 50,000
Preceded by	Succeeded by
Circassians	Kabardian Provisional Court

The Princedom of Kabardia (Kabardian: Къэбэрдей Пщыгъуэ), also known as Eastern Circassia (Kabardian: Шъхьагъ, lit. 'upper region'), was a historical country in the North Caucasus corresponding partly to modern-day Kabardino-Balkaria. It existed as a political community from the fifteenth century until it came under Russian control in the early nineteenth century after the Russo-Circassian War.

== Name ==
The origin of the name Kabardia is disputed among historians. It is known that the Belbek River in southwestern Crimea was previously known as Kabarda. In the northern Sea of Azov region, near modern Taganrog, there was a settlement called Kobardi, marked on the map of Angelino Dulcert in 1339 and reportedly existing until the 16th century. A. V. Gadlo connected the origin of the name Kabardia with the Adyghe population of Alania, known as the Kabars. He proposed that the ethnonym "Kabar" derived from a Turkic-Khazar term meaning "unconquered" or "unsubmissive".

According to Gadlo's research, a Kabar-Adyghe region existed in Alania between the 11th and 13th centuries. However, accepting this interpretation, Naloeva notes that the Adyghe name of Kabardia, Qabardey (Къэбэрдей), lacks the possessive suffix "-ey", which was traditionally used in the names of Adyghe princely possessions.

Another interpretation connects the origin of the name Kabardia with the territory associated with the Tambiy clan. According to this view, Qabard Tambiy, who arrived from the Abazins of Tam and gained control over the lands of the eastern Circassian Kabars, received the name Qabard. In this interpretation, the element "d" is derived from the Abaza forms "d" or "du", meaning "great" or "large". Based on this explanation, the name Qabard Tambiy would translate as "great Kabar", corresponding to the image of a ruler among the eastern Adyghe. The Adyghe term Qabardey, meaning Kabardia, is interpreted as "the domain of the great Kabars".

Other explanations have also been proposed. Bodenti suggested that the name originated from the Georgian word "Kabarda", meaning "side". Julius Klaproth, while expressing uncertainty, proposed that the name may have originated among the Chechens, interpreting it as a combination of ka ("strip") and bard ("shore"), meaning "coastal strip".

=== Ethnonyms and exonyms ===
Ethnonyms and exonyms for Kabardia
Language	Name
Eastern Circassian	Къэбэрдей (Qabardey)
Western Circassian	Къэбэртай (Qabartay)
Karachay-Balkar	Къабарты (Qabarty)
Ossetian language	Кæсæг (Kæsæg)
Georgian language	ყაბარდო (Q'abardo)
Turkish language	Kabartay
Abkhaz language	Аҟабарда (Aq'abarda)
Avar language	Кабарда (Kabarda)
Nakh language	Кабардой (Kabardoy)
Russian language	Кабарда (Kabarda)

== Territory ==
=== Borders ===
In the late 16th and first half of the 17th centuries, Kabardia occupied a large part of the central and northeastern North Caucasus, with its territory estimated at 80,000 km^{2}. It extended from the northern slopes of the Greater Caucasus into the North Caucasian steppe.

The western border was formed by the Urup River, which separated Kabardia from Besleney and the western Circassian territories. The eastern border extended towards the Caspian Sea, with the Bystraya River described as the boundary between Kabardians and the peoples of Dagestan. The fortress of Terki is also associated with Kabardian territory in some accounts.

The southern border followed the Greater Caucasus, historically also referred to as the "Circassian Mountains". Important passes, particularly the Daryal Gorge, connected Kabardia with Transcaucasia and were of considerable strategic importance. The main Kabardian settlements and agricultural and pastoral lands were concentrated in the valleys of the Urup, Zelenchuk, Malka, Baksan, Cherek, Urukh, Terek and Sunzha rivers.

Thus, Kabardia's territory can broadly be described as extending from the Urup River in the west to the Caspian lowlands in the east, the Greater Caucasus in the south, and the North Caucasian steppe in the north. The exact borders varied according to the period and source, as territorial control in the region was generally based on political influence over valleys, settlements and pasturelands rather than fixed frontiers.

==== Greater Kabardia ====
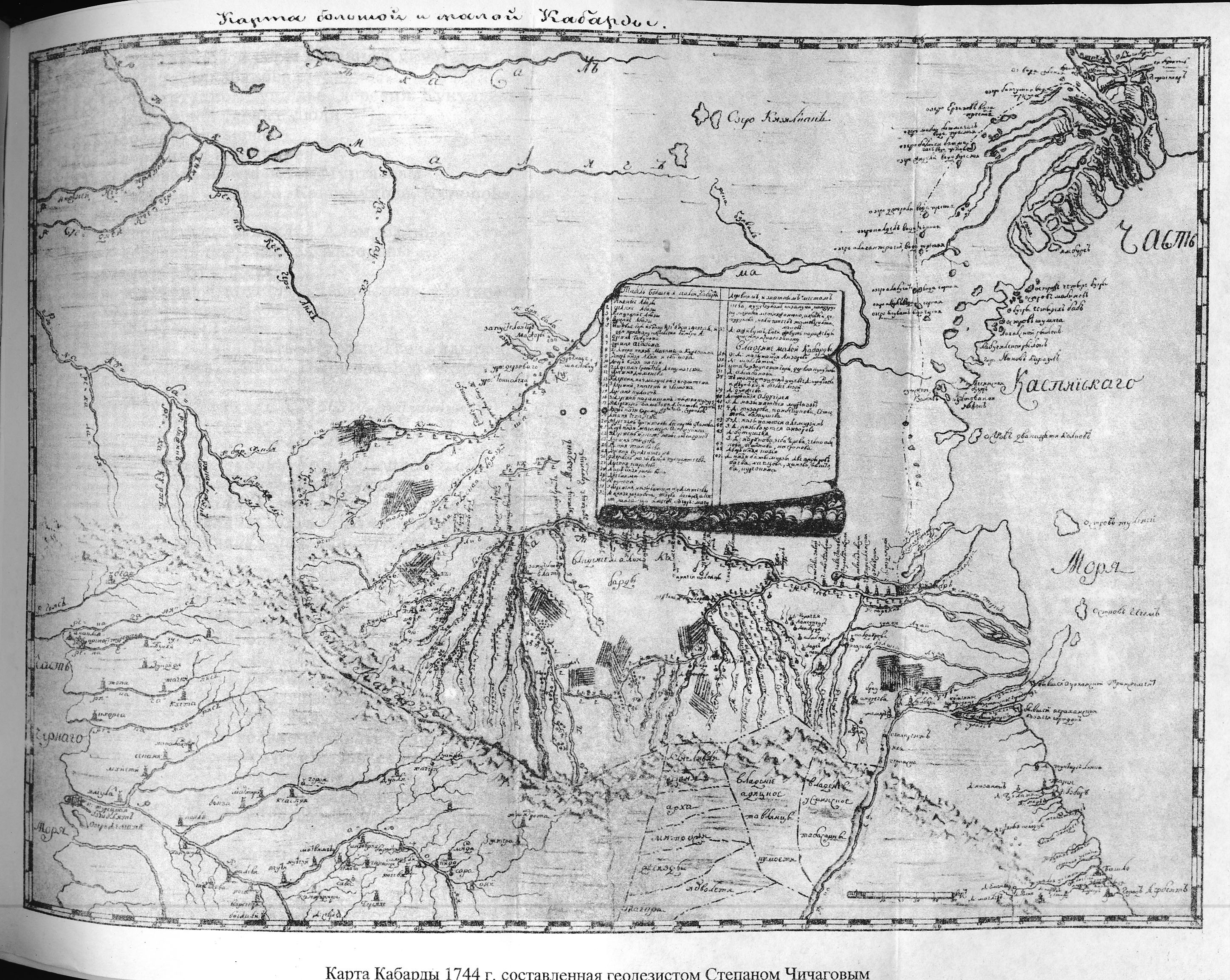
Map of the villages in Kabardia by Surveyor Stepan Chichagov (1744)

Greater Kabardia, or Upper Kabardia occupied a vast territory in the central part of the North Caucasus. Its lands stretched from the Kuban river and Kuma river in the north and northwest to the confluence of the Baksan and Terek rivers. To the south, the territory extended along the northern slopes of the Caucasus Mountains, from the region of Elbrus eastward to the confluence of the Terek and Malka rivers. This area included fertile plains, foothills, and important river valleys which supported agriculture, pastoralism, and trade routes connecting the steppe with the mountain regions. Within Greater Kabarda, several powerful princely clans held a dominant political position. Among the most influential were the families of the Jembulat, Hatokhshoqo, and Misost, who controlled large territories and played a central role in the political leadership of Kabardia.

==== Lesser Kabardia ====
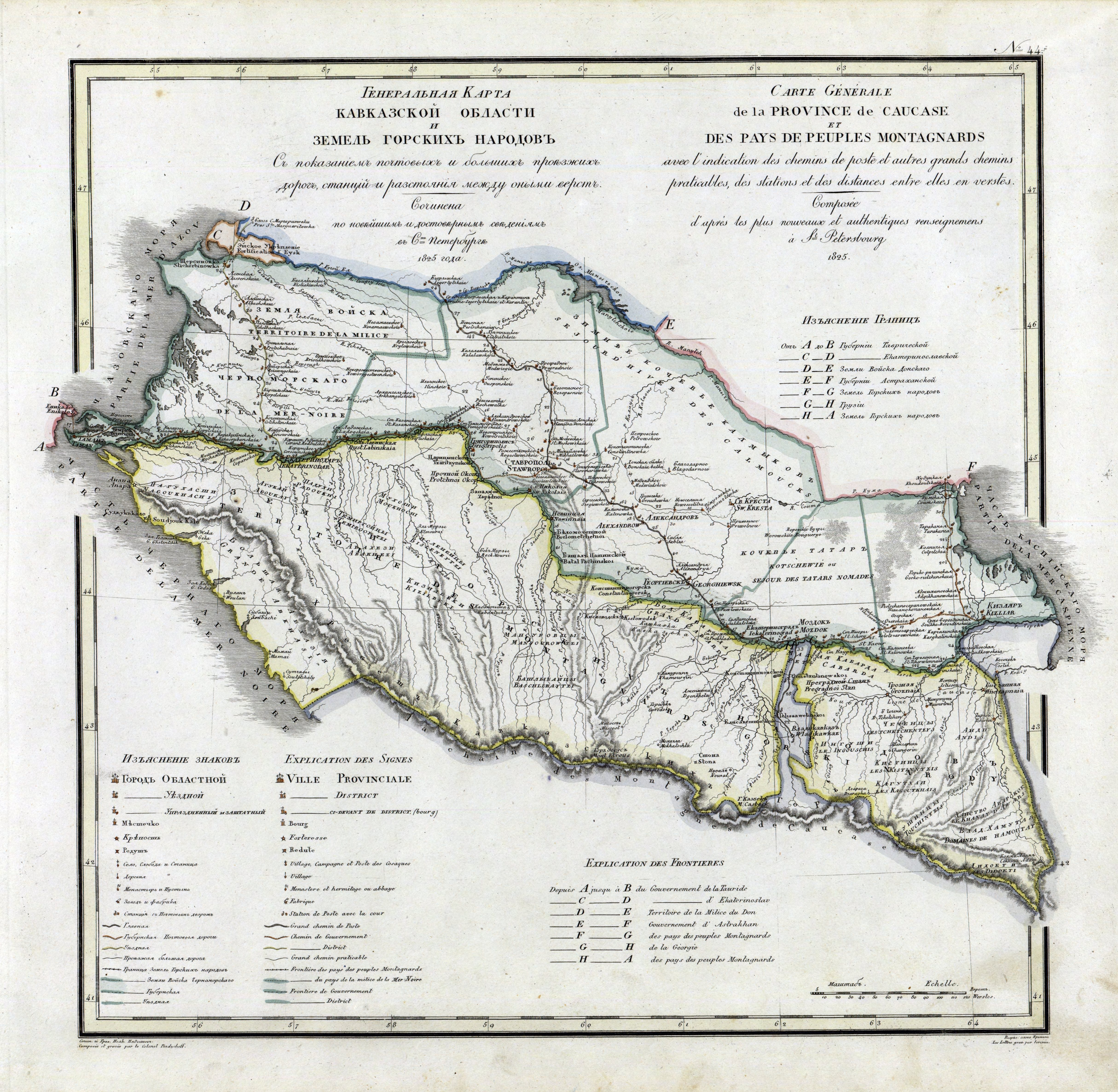
Lesser Kabarda between Mozdok and Grozny (1825)

Lesser Kabardia was a historical region of Kabardia ruled by Talostaney and Jilakhstaney. The region was divided by Greater Kabardia via the Terek River, Kabardians who lived on the eastern coast of Terek were called "Lesser Kabardians" and those who lived on the west were called "Greater" or "Upper Kabardians". The territories of Lesser Kabardia now consist of modern-day Tersk district in Kabardino-Balkaria, Nadterechny and Grozny districts in northeastern Chechnya, as well as parts of Ingushetia and North Ossetia.

At the beginning of the 19th century, Lesser Kabardia bordered the Terek river and Greater Kabardia to the west and north, the southernmost part abutted Vladikavkaz and southeastern parts were bordering the Sunzha river. The territory of Lesser Kabardia was rich in both forests and water. The lands were sparsely populated, and the steppes were used by local residents as pastures The Ossetian mountain societies and the Ingush were dependent on Lesser Kabardia, and the Karachay-Balkars were dependent on Greater Kabardia.

== History ==
=== Circassian migrations ===
The genealogies of Kabardia's rulers trace their origins back to the legendary ruler Inal the Great. According to these genealogies, the Yidar, Qaziy, Shojenuqo, Misost, Jembulat, Bechmirza, Hatokhshoqo, Jilakhstan, and Talostan families were considered his descendants. J. Kagezezhev notes that Kabardia emerged from the viceroyalty of Qabard Tambiy, located between the Urup and Terek rivers. Kabardians established their states following the power vacuum created after the defeat of the Golden Horde khan Tokhtamysh by Tamerlane in the Tokhtamysh–Timur war. They migrated deep into the Central Caucasus, pushing back the Alanians, ancestors of modern Ossetians, as well as Karachay and Balkar groups, forcing them into the mountainous gorges and settling the plains, thereby forming Kabardia. Scholars differ on the timing of Circassian migration to Kabardia. Some historians place it in the 11th-12th centuries (Note: S. Khotko, B. Chich, and B. Kerefov) some suggest early migration in the 13th century and mass movements in the 14th–15th centuries, preceded by sporadic migrations in the 12th century. (Note: A. Gadlo) Some date it to the late 14th–early 15th centuries, (Note: A. Smirnov, V. Vinogradov, and R. Shatum) while others argue for migration by the mid-13th century. (Note: L. Lavrov and others) Others (Note: I. Kalmykov) also argue it's the second half of the 13th–early 14th century. Some historians (Note: R. Betrozov, A. Nagoev, and V. Kuznetsov) favor the 15th–16th centuries, citing the absence of Golden Horde numismatics and evidence from regional chronicles. Other scholars (Note: L. Apostolov, V. Kudashev, K. Laipanov, and I. Shamanov) date the arrival to post-14th century, after Turkish conquests of Taman. Overall, consensus places Kabardian expansion and consolidation by the 16th century, with their principality emerging by the mid-15th century.

During their expansion, the Kabardians occupied lands from the upper Kuban River to the Sunzha River, encompassing both foothills and plains. They became a lingua franca in the Central Caucasus from the 16th to 18th centuries, interacting diplomatically and genealogically with neighboring groups, including the Ossetian Tsargasats and the Talostanians of Lesser Kabardia. The Balkars recognized Kabardians as "Cherkesle," and their territory as "Kabardy." A letter from the Baksan party of Kabardian princes to Elizabeth I states that during Inal's reign, Janibek ruled Crimea, placing the foundation of the Kabardian dynasty no later than the 1470s.

=== Creation of the state (legend of Qabard Tambiy) ===
At the beginning of the 15th century, the Adyghe began expanding into the plains and foothills of the North Caucasus, displacing the Golden Horde. Historian A. A. Tsutsiev has described this process as the "Kabardian reconquista of the plains and foothills of the Central Caucasus".

The Legend of the Migration of Kabarda Tambiev was published by Lev Lopatinsky in 1891 in the Collection of Descriptions of the Tribes and Localities of the Caucasus.

According to the legend, during the campaigns of Inal the Great against Genoese fortresses on the Black Sea, Qabard Tambiy distinguished himself and subsequently became the hero of a cycle of Circassian legends. The legend states that, after agreeing to evacuate the fortress of Khumaran under Inal's guarantee of safe conduct, the departing Genoese were overtaken by a cavalry detachment led by Qabard Tambiy, which destroyed them.

According to modern scholarship, part of the Adyghe population migrated eastward during the Middle Ages, moving from the northwestern Caucasus toward the Pyatigorsk area and the valleys of the Malka and Terek rivers. This tradition is also reflected in The Legend, which states that "Tambiy headed up the Pshiza (Kuban) River to places occupied by other tribes...".

According to the legend, this migration was led by Qabard Tambiy. He is described as being of the Tlekotlesh noble estate. Shora Nogmov, in his History of the Adyghe People, listed the Tambiy family first among five prominent uzden families, while Johann Blaramberg described the Tambiys as among the most prominent nobles of Greater Kabardia. The existence of Qabard Tambiy as a historical figure has also been associated with the testimony of Russian traveler M. N. Vladykin, who visited Kabardia in 1872 and wrote:

"Having crossed the Baksan and driven to the village of Atazhukin, we began to climb Mount Makho-gaps, on the top of which we saw a pile of stones, surrounded by a half-collapsed wattle fence, the grave of Kabarda Tambiev, the founder of the Kabardians. Before us, below, as if in the palm of our hand, was all of former Kabarda, from which, like islands from the sea, rose the Pyatigorsk mountains: Beshtau, Mashuk, and others; to the right was the Chegem Gorge, beyond which stretched the endless line of the Black Forest Mountains; ahead of them, an endless plain merged with the horizon, along which ran the Kabardian rivers and the Terek; To the left, full of thunderclouds, the Baksan Gorge loomed black, and above it towered Elbrus, from which stretched an endless snow chain, closing the southern side of the panorama,"

According to the legend, the capture of Khumaran enabled Inal to expand east of the Kuban River. These campaigns were led by Qabard Tambiy, who is said to have established a new settlement on the right bank of the Malka River, surrounding it with earthen fortifications and a watchtower that served as a base for further expansion eastward.

According to this interpretation, the eastward expansion of the Kabardians brought them into conflict with Tatar groups. It has been argued that, because nomadic hordes are no longer recorded in Central Ciscaucasia by the second quarter of the 15th century, the Tatars had been driven northward.

According to a number of historians, the migration of a new wave of Adyghe settlers into Central Ciscaucasia occurred in several stages, beginning in the Kuban region and continuing eastward. They argue that Central Ciscaucasia subsequently became part of Kabardia, citing both written sources and the distribution of the Kabardian burial-mound culture of the 14th–17th centuries. These burial mounds are known to the Ossetians as kashaji ularmata and to the Vainakhs as chergsi kash barts. According to this interpretation, the Kabardians had established a strong position in Central Ciscaucasia by the 15th century after resisting the Great Horde. It is further claimed that in 1494 the Kabardians campaigned against Horde encampments in Ciscaucasia, and that in 1498 they launched another offensive which forced the Horde to withdraw beyond the Don River, abandoning the Ciscaucasian steppes.

According to the legend, Qabard Tambiy later moved his settlement beyond the Baksan River. Researchers have noted that the geographical details provided in the legend correspond with descriptions by Johann Blaramberg and M. N. Vladykin. The legend also recounts the founding of Qudenet's aul, explaining that Tambiy granted his son-in-law Qudenet as much land as could be enclosed by an ox hide. This motif has been compared with the legend surrounding the founding of Carthage by Dido.

Some historians have suggested that this legend may preserve elements of older traditions inherited from earlier populations of the Caucasus. According to the narrative, Qudenet thereby acquired lands including the Chegem River, whose name survives today and is also mentioned in historical descriptions of Greater Kabardia.

At the end of The Legend, the extent of Kabardian settlement is summarized:

"Over time, many Kabardian auls were founded on the Malka, Baksan, Chegem, and other small rivers, and the entire region began to be called Kabarda by the name of the founder of the first aul, and the inhabitants, Kabardians."

Fomenko argues that this tradition reflects the historical development of Kabardian settlement in the region and notes that local historians in Kabardino-Balkaria have reported the discovery of what they identify as the burial site of the founder of Kabardia.

According to Fomenko, The Legend preserves memories of real historical events and an actual historical figure, although embellished through the processes of oral tradition and myth-making. He argues that the survival of such traditions illustrates the importance of folklore in reconstructing the historical past of the peoples of the North Caucasus.

According to the legend, Qabard Tambiy did not become a prince in the eastern Adyghe lands but remained a Tlekotlesh, while enjoying the patronage of princes descended from Inal. The legend further relates that, after complaints were brought before Inal regarding Qabard Tambiy's conduct, Inal personally intervened and punished him. It also attributes to Inal the naming of the eastern Adyghe lands as Kabardia.

=== 15th century (early conflicts) ===
Map of the Caucasus in 1450

During the 1486 campaign in the Caucasus, the army of Sheikh Haydar devastated not only Dagestan but also regions of Central Ciscaucasia, including Kabardia, and advanced as far as the Northwestern Caucasus. The Venetian diplomat Josaphat Barbaro provided a description of the campaign based on the testimony of his informant:

A certain sect of Muslims left the Sultan's country, with the zeal of their faith calling for the death of Christians. And the further they went towards Persia, the more these swindlers increased in number; they chose the road towards the sea of Baku and came to Shemakha, and then to Derbent, and from there to Tyumen. They were partly on horseback, partly on foot, partly armed, and partly without weapons, in enormous numbers. They appeared at the river called Terek, which is in the province of Tezekiah, and near the Caspian Mountains, where there are many Catholic Christians, and in every place where they found Christians they killed everyone without distinction, women, men, children, and adults. Then they entered the countries of Gog and Magog, who are also Christians but according to the Greek rite, and did the same to them. Then they moved towards Circassia, passing towards the tribe Kippike and towards the tribe Karbatri, which are both on the side of the Great Sea, and did similar things in those places. Finally, those from the tribes Tetarkossa and Kremuk fought with them and inflicted such a crushing defeat that not twenty out of a hundred escaped, fleeing in disarray to their own country. Therefore, we can imagine the pitiful condition of the Christians who live around here.

Map of Caucasus in 1490

In 1492, the Great Horde temporarily settled in the Kuma River valley, located on the northern edge of the North Caucasus. At the time, the Horde was experiencing political instability and searching for new areas where it could sustain itself. During its stay in the region, the Horde established camps and engaged in agricultural activity, cultivating crops in the surrounding plains. From this base, the Horde also carried out a military campaign against the Circassians, reflecting the continuing conflicts between steppe nomadic groups and the mountain populations of the North Caucasus. Later that same year, however, conditions in the region deteriorated. A failure of crops and other economic difficulties made it increasingly difficult for the Horde to maintain its position in the Kuma valley. As a result, the Horde moved closer to the frontier of Kabardia and entered the Pyatigorsk region, an area that served as an important transitional zone between the steppe and the mountainous territories of the Circassians. During this period of migration, several major Tatar tribal groups decided to separate from the main body of the Horde and migrate toward the Volga River, seeking more stable pastures and political security. The leadership of the Great Horde eventually followed these groups, marking the end of its temporary presence in the Kuma–Pyatigorsk region.

=== 16th century ===
The 16th century started with an Ottoman-Crimean incursion for Eastern and Western Circassians. In 1504, Şehzade Mehmed led an expedition into Kabardia, intending to seize lands controlled by the Yidarey dynasty. Mehmed requested military support from the Crimean Khanate, but this request was rejected. The campaign ultimately failed after Mehmed was poisoned on the orders of his father, Bayezid II. the Kabardians faced another war by the Crimeans in 1518, which the Kabardians briefly won according to the Russian reports, they destroyed more than half of the Crimean army

==== Era of Beslan ====
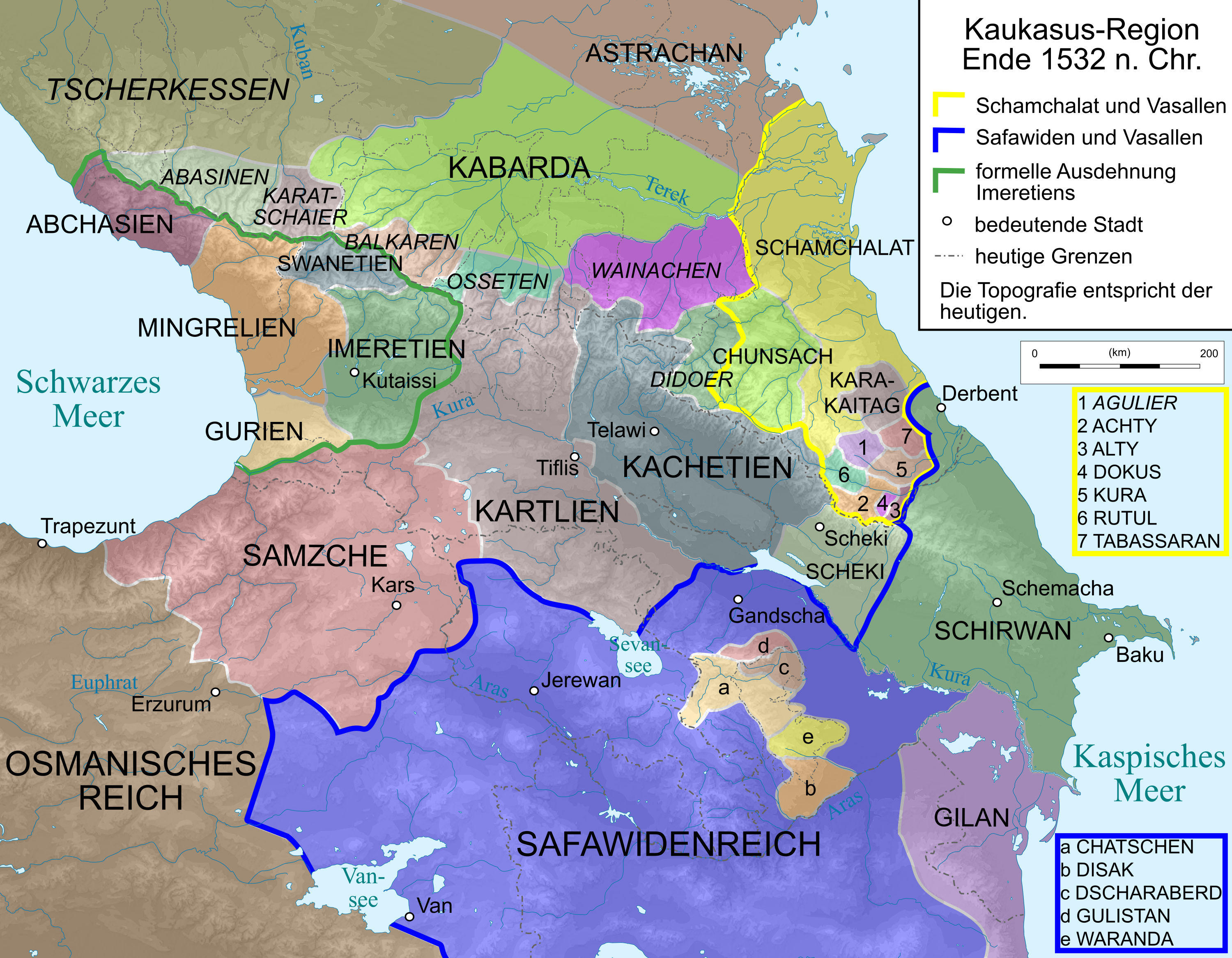
Map of Caucasus in 1532, during the reign of Beslan Jankhot

In the 1530s, Kabardian influence expanded further toward the Caspian Sea. Beslan Jankhot of Kabardia pursued an active policy in the Lower Terek basin. According to Circassian tradition, during his reign Kabardian forces reached Astrakhan and conducted raids as far as Derbent. He concluded an alliance with the Shamkhalate of Tarki, the largest feudal domain in Dagestan, which helped secure trade routes linking Astrakhan and Derbent with Kabardia.

According to folklore, Kabardian expeditions to Astrakhan were periodic, described as occurring every nine to ten years in order to obtain textiles and other goods that were scarce in Kabardia. These campaigns reportedly yielded significant booty and strengthened the authority of the supreme prince.

Historically, Adyghe Khabze underwent multiple reforms to adapt to changing societal needs.<ref">Sözer Özdemir, Şebnem (2021). "Conceptual Framework of a Transmission Project for Safeguarding Circassian Dances in Turkey" [Türkiye'deki Çerkes Danslarını Koruma Aimlı Bir Aktarım Projesinin Kavramsal Çerçevesi]. Millî Folklor. 17 (132).</ref> Major reforms were led by Prince Beslan the Fat, who established unified legal proceedings, formalized new rituals, and introduced specific horse brands for noble families.

Beslan is traditionally credited with codifying the Kabardian social hierarchy by formalizing distinctions within the nobility (uorqi) and the peasantry. Modern researchers, however, note that social stratification had already developed prior to his reign; Beslan's authority served primarily to adjust, refine, and codify existing social arrangements rather than invent them instantaneously.

The judicial system in Kabardia evolved over several centuries. Following the decline of the forty-judge system originally established by Inal the Great, 16th-century legal reforms under Beslan restructured judicial authorities into local village arbitration courts for civil disputes and a central court under the prince for criminal and national matters.

According to the account of Shora Nogmov:

"Berslan, in continuing his rule over the Kabardian people and wishing to strengthen their prosperity and provide justice for all, established in every village a kheezja, or arbitration court, where all cases except criminal ones were heard. Complaints and disputes were examined by individuals elected annually by the inhabitants with the approval of the prince. Complaints against judges, criminal cases, and matters concerning the entire people were decided under the chairmanship of the prince in the he, or main court, located at the prince's residence. Berslan also introduced various fines for violations of the laws and rites he had established and attempted to suppress wrongdoing by depriving certain princes of their titles or exiling them. In addition, he introduced a special brand for the horses of himself and the uzden, still known as the Berslan brand. Horses found bearing this mark after theft were subject to severe punishment for the offender."

==== After Beslan and Civil War of 1530s ====
In 1533, the Nogais recaptured Astrakhan and deposed the pro Kabardian khan. This marked the beginning of intensified Nogai efforts to establish dominance in the Ciscaucasia. Following the capture of Astrakhan, the Nogais organized a major campaign against Kabardia. In the spring of 1535, a large Nogai force advanced into the Ciscaucasia. The first major engagement occurred at the confluence of the Malka and Terek rivers. The Nogais pushed the Kabardian forces back, compelling them to withdraw toward the area between the Baksan and Psygansu rivers. The Nogais advanced through the region and burned abandoned settlements Kabardian forces then conducted a series of counterattacks against dispersed Nogai detachments. The Nogais regrouped and moved toward the Psygansu River, confronting Kabardian defensive positions in the area between present day Aushiger and Kashkatau. After heavy fighting, Kabardian forces withdrew into mountainous terrain. Further engagements took place in the mountain gorges and forests, resulting in substantial casualties on both sides. Following the arrival of approximately 2,000 Abazins, Kabardian forces launched a counteroffensive. In a decisive battle near Mount Kashkatau, the Nogai army was defeated and retreated. Kabardian forces pursued the withdrawing enemy and captured prisoners. The conflict resulted in significant losses among the Kabardian nobility, including the youngest son of Yidar Kidirshoko.

In 1537/1538, a major internal conflict called the Battle of Kyzburun broke out, the conflict was fought between the coalition of Prince Yidar and opposing Kabardian princes, primarily Talostan Jankhot, supported by Abazin forces. The conflict emerged from a succession struggle following the fragmentation of authority among Circassian nobles. Yidar, with support from the Western Circassian principalities, was the main prince fighting in the conflict. The opposing Kabardian forces established a defensive position near Mount Kyzburun along the Baksan River and were reinforced by Abazin infantry. Both sides fielded large forces, and the battle was marked by intense fighting, preserved in Circassian oral tradition. Yidar's coalition ultimately secured victory. In the aftermath, Yidar was recognized as the Grand Prince of Kabardia, consolidating power and establishing the dominance of his lineage. The victory led to political realignment within Kabardia, including the decline of rival princely houses and the migration of certain groups. However, the outcome also contributed to prolonged internal tensions and rivalries, as Yidar's reliance on external allies affected perceptions of his legitimacy among Kabardian elites.

==== Crimean invasion (1545) ====
===== Qanshawuq in Kabardia =====
According to Umdetü'l-Ahbâr, after his defeat by the Crimeans, the Zhane prince Qanshawuq first fled to Bzhedugia and later sought refuge in Kabardia. Sahib Giray initially returned to Crimea, but upon learning that Qanshawuq was gathering supporters in Kabardia and blocking the Taman–Kıdımit route, he mobilized his forces once more and entered Kabardia through Azak (Azov). The Crimean army advanced to the headwaters of the Terek River, reaching a place identified in the sources as "Kolkuçin". Ottoman sources describe this locality as "Beştepe" ("Five Hills") or "Beşdağ", specifically identifying it with the Kaşkadağ (Kashkatau) area. The army established a temporary camp there beside a water source. Qanshawuq assembled a large force from the local population and his remaining followers, reportedly numbering more than 10,000 Kabardians.

According to Remmal Hoca, however, Qanshawuq arrived in Kabardia in the autumn of 1545 with only 200 followers after his defeat. He sought an alliance with the local rulers against Sahib Giray and proposed capturing the fortress of Azak to cut the Khan's supply lines. The Kabardian rulers rejected the proposal, considering the Crimean army too close, and ordered Qanshawuq to leave, resulting in the loss of his remaining political influence.

===== The night attack =====
According to Umdetü'l-Ahbâr, recognizing the Crimean army's numerical superiority and greater firepower, Qanshawuq avoided a pitched battle and instead launched a surprise night attack. The Crimean troops, encamped beside the water without adequate defensive preparations, were caught off guard. Qanshawuq's cavalry threw the camp into confusion, routing many Crimean soldiers and scattering their formations. The fleeing troops retreated toward the river identified in the source as "Kömesi-Suyu", generally identified with the modern Kuma River.

===== End of the campaign =====
The following day, Sahib Giray reorganized his forces and launched a counterattack. The Crimean army outflanked the Circassian force from both sides, inflicting a decisive defeat. Most of Qanshawuq's army was killed or captured, while he escaped with a small group of followers toward the Kuma River. Continuing the pursuit, the Crimeans captured members of Qanshawuq's family, his relatives, and other Zhane inhabitants in the Baksan region. Qanshawuq eventually retreated to the upper reaches of the Urup River and the mountains north of "Sokum". After suppressing the uprising, Sahib Giray deported many captives to Crimea, where they were resettled, thereby restoring Crimean authority in the region. These events significantly weakened both Qanshawuq's military power and the Principality of Zhane.

According to Remmal Hoca, the Crimean army returned to Bakhchysarai via Temryuk, Kerch, and Caffa. Victory reports and captives were sent to the Ottoman Sultan and neighboring rulers. Remmal Hoca further states that during Sahib Giray's 1551 campaign against the Hatuqay princes Aledjuq and Antenuq, the Khan inquired about Qanshawuq's whereabouts while in Kabardia. An envoy informed him that Qanshawuq had previously arrived there with 200 followers seeking allies but, having lost his political influence, was searching for refuge far from his homeland.

==== Era of Yidars ====
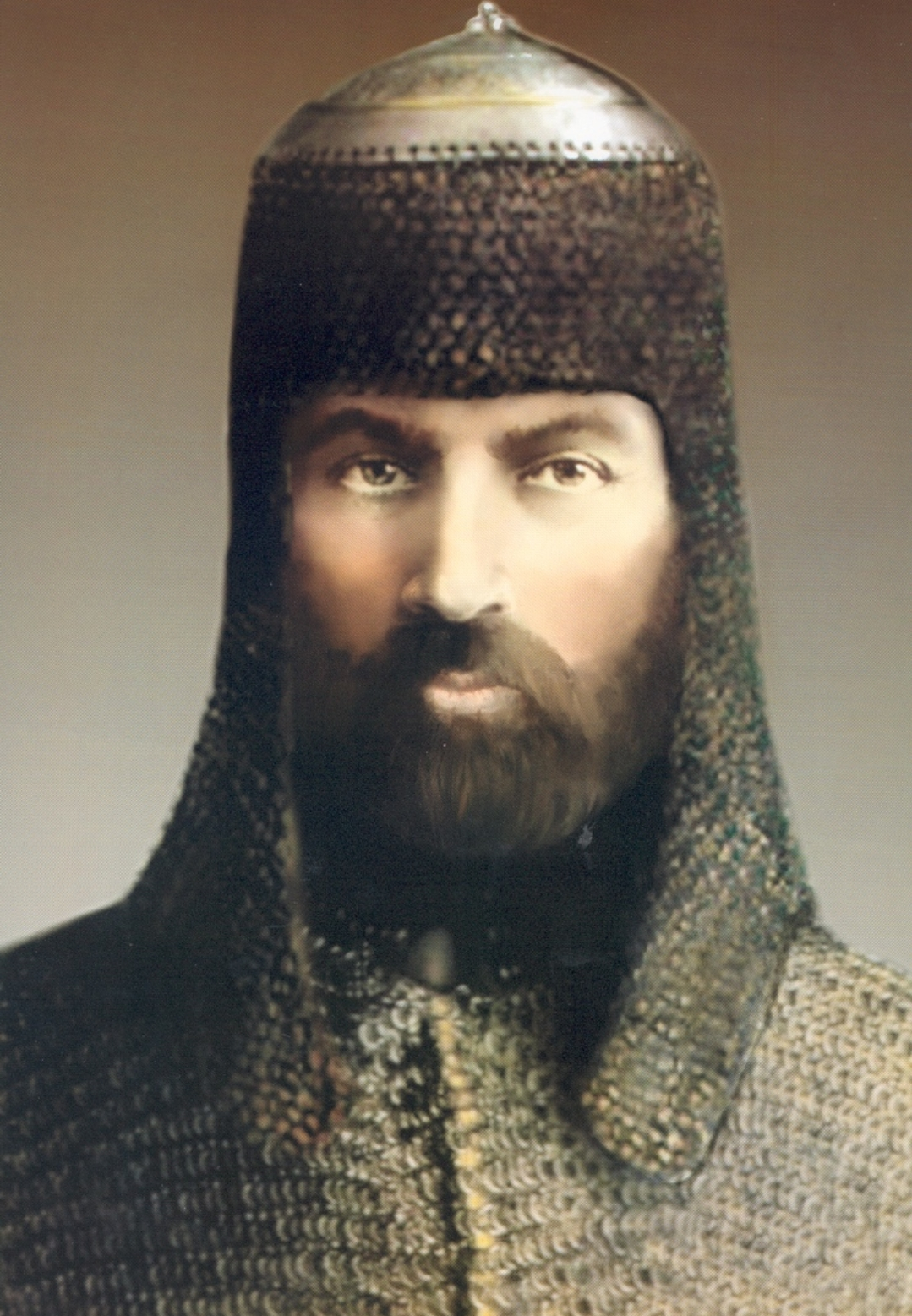
Modern depiction of Temruqo

After Yidar died, Qeytuqo I Beslan came to power and ruled until the 1550s. After him, the Kabardian prince Temruqo Yidar started ruling Kabardia.

Most available sources are silent on Temruqo's early years, but he became the Grand Prince of Kabardia in the 1550s. His ascension faced immediate opposition from rival princes, notably Qanshao Jilakhstenqo, who allied with the Kumyks and persuaded Avar leader Khadan Utsmi to invade Kabardia. In response, Temruqo allied with Trans-Kuban leaders, including Lev Achba of the Abazins and Yelzheruqo Qanoqo of the Besleneys, who took supreme military command. Following failed negotiations, a fierce three-day battle near the Terek River resulted in Khadan Utsmi's death, causing chaos in his army; allied Kabardian forces routed the invaders, with only a third escaping.

Concurrently, Kabardia faced repeated aggression from the Crimean Khanate under Khan Devlet I Giray. Crimean hordes raided Kabardian territory in 1553, 1554, 1555, and 1556. Despite heavy losses, including two thousand supporting Russian troops in 1555, the Kabardians repeatedly repulsed Crimean forces, inflicting major casualties and forcing Devlet Giray to retreat without establishing a permanent foothold. In 1556, acting on orders from Tsar Ivan IV alongside Dmytro Vyshnevetsky's anti-Tatar campaigns, Kabardian princes Tazdrup and Dozibok captured the coastal strongholds of Temryuk and Taman, where Temruqo built a strategic fortress bearing his name.

Seeking long-term stability and protection against regional foes, Temruqo initiated diplomatic ties with Moscow. In July 1557, a Kabardian embassy under Qanqilich Qanoqo arrived in Moscow requesting Tsar Ivan IV's formal patronage and military assistance against the Shamkhalate. In response to Kabardian complaints of Kumyk raids, Russian voivode I. S. Cheremisinov launched a maritime expedition from Astrakhan in summer 1560, capturing and burning Tarki and forcing Shamkhal Buday I into the mountains. The alliance was sealed in August 1561 through the marriage of Ivan IV to Temruqo's daughter, Maria Temryukovna, elevating Temruqo's standing, centralizing his rule, and encouraging several Kabardian nobles, including his son Saltan, to convert to Orthodoxy while educating them in Moscow.

Throughout the 1560s, Temruqo and Russian troops conducted joint campaigns to neutralize internal rivals and counter external threats. In December 1562, a joint force under Temruqo and Russian commanders Grigory Pleshcheyev and Grigory Vrazhsky attacked the Qeytuqey princes, capturing three fortified towns (Mokhan, Engir, and Kavan) and imposing tribute on the region. Another expedition under Ivan Dashkov in 1565–1566 secured victories against rival claimants Shiapshoqo, Tazrit, and Manta. In 1567, Shamkhal Buday I and Ghazi ibn Urak of the Lesser Nogai Horde intervened on behalf of rival prince Pshiapshoqo Qeytuqo; Temruqo's forces defeated the coalition, killing Buday I and his brother, which severely curtailed Dagestani influence in Kabardia. During the 1569 Ottoman–Crimean expedition against Astrakhan, Kabardian cavalry actively harassed the retreating Ottoman forces, contributing significantly to the campaign's collapse.

Temruqo's reign culminated in a final clash with the Crimean Khanate during the Battle of Afips in July 1570. Facing an invading army led by Kalga Adil Giray, Temruqo rallied Kabardian and Adyghe forces at a fortification near the confluence of the Akhupa and Kuban rivers. During intense combat on July 30, Temruqo was pierced by an arrow and mortally wounded while resisting Crimean river-crossing attempts. The fortress was eventually overrun, and two of Temruqo's sons, Beberyuk and Mamstruk, were taken prisoner. Temruqo Yidar died from his injuries shortly thereafter in 1571, dealing a severe blow to the Yidar dynasty's dominance and leaving behind a legacy marked by political centralization, strategic Russian alignment, and enduring border conflicts.

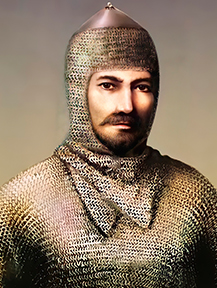
Modern depiction of Qambolet

After the death of Temruqo Yidar, he was succeeded by his brother, Qambolet, as the Grand Prince of Kabardia. The Muscovites played no role in his election, as he was chosen solely by the Kabardian princes. Due to the presence of Crimean forces nearby and the loss of Temruqo, Qambolet initially maintained traditional Kabardian–Crimean relations rather than fully aligning with Muscovy.

In 1576, the forces of the Lesser Nogai bey Ghazi ibn Urak invaded Lesser Kabardia, but were defeated by the Kabardians led by the Yidars under Qambolet and the Talostaneys under Sholokh Tepsaruqo. Although Nogai forces initially inflicted heavy losses, they were ambushed and defeated during their retreat. Ghazi ibn Urak, two of his brothers, several of his sons, and commanders Iman-Girey and Chebar-Murza were killed by Kabardian forces. Pshiapshoqo Qeytuqo fought on the side of the Nogais and the Crimean Khanate, pursuing a pro-Crimean policy.

In the spring of 1578, an embassy headed by Qambolet arrived in Moscow. In accordance with the "shertnaya gramota", Qambolet pledged service to Tsar Ivan IV and his son, Tsarevich Ivan Ivanovich. Qambolet's son, Qarashay, accompanied the embassy and remained in Moscow, where he was baptized as Boris Kambulatovich Cherkassky. Qambolet received a "large charter" bearing the "30-lot seal" of Ivan IV. Simultaneously, Luka Novosiltsev was sent to Kabardia with troops, firepower, and carpenters to construct a Russian fortress. During this period, Crimean Kalga Adil Giray, en route to Shirvan, requested passage across the Sunzha River, which was guarded by the Terek Cossacks. The Crimean army was later defeated in Iran, and during its retreat, Novosiltsev's forces attacked its remnants and captured horses, while the kalga himself was captured in Iran. Qambolet's original charter has not survived; as noted by S. A. Belokurov, "the pillar is dilapidated and fallen apart." Information about it survives through a document issued by Ivan IV to Prince Mamstruk Temryukovich, which references the 1578 "shert" and Novosiltsev's mission, emphasizing that the charter was granted with a golden seal to Prince Qambolet of Kabardia for the entire "Cherkasy land".

The Terek city built by Novosiltsev was short-lived, as its construction provoked protests from the Crimean Khanate. In 1579, under Crimean pressure and due to Russian difficulties during the Livonian War, the fort was dismantled. However, in 1588, a new fort garrisoned by Streltsy and equipped with artillery was established at the mouth of the Terek River under commander A. I. Khvorostinin, maintaining ongoing diplomatic ties between Russia and Kabardia.

In January 1588, Qambolet's son, Qudenet Qambolet, and Temruqo's son, Mamstruk, arrived in Moscow requesting protection from the Crimeans, Sholokh Tepsaruqo, and the Qeytuqo family. Both envoys swore allegiance to the Russian state on July 25 during the reign of Tsar Fyodor I Ivanovich. In response, the tsar accepted them under his royal patronage, promised protection, and ordered the construction of a fortified settlement. The envoys returned to Kabardia in August with a charter confirming relations between Russia and Kabardia, in which Qambolet and Qudenet played a central role, while the Qeytuqos, Talostans, and Jilakhstans remained aligned with the Crimean Khanate and the Shamkhalate of Tarki.

Qambolet Yidar died in 1589, triggering a renewed power struggle within Kabardia between the Qeytuqeys allied with Yidareys against the principality of Talostaney.

==== Era of Sholokh and Mudar ====
In November 1589, a coalition of the Qeytuqo and Yidarey factions launched a coordinated military campaign against the Principality of Talostaney owned by Sholokh Tepsaruqo, because of his political rivalry with Russia. They were supported by approximately 750 Russian Cossack troops sent from the Terek voivodeship under the command of Grigory Poltev. The operation aimed to eliminate Talostaney resistance and prevent outside influence from Ottoman, Crimean, and Kumyk-aligned forces. The allied forces held a significant numerical advantage, fielding around 4,500 cavalry compared to Talostaney's estimated 2,000 horsemen. The campaign was conducted rapidly and with heavy destruction. Contemporary accounts describe the burning or capture of more than 30 out of roughly 40 settlements in Talostaney territory. Sholokh Tepsaruqo's forces were decisively defeated. He was forced to submit, and compelled to recognize Jansokh Qeytuqo's authority as the Grand Prince of Kabardia. he handed over hostages, including his son and twenty other nobles.

In 1596, Kabardian forces led by princes Sholokh and Aytech advanced through the Daryal Gorge, seizing fortified settlements (kabaki) belonging to the Vainakh noble Sultan-Murza. After establishing control in the highlands, they moved southward into Kartli's mountainous borderlands, specifically targeting the Sioni and Ksani regions.

In May 1597, King Alexander II of Kartli reported the incursion to Russian envoys Kuzma Savin and Andrei Polukhanov. According to their account, Alexander informed them that "Solokh, the Kabardian ruler, and Aitek-Murza" had invaded the "land of Soni," killing many and taking numerous captives. The term "ruler" (gosudar) used by Alexander in reference to Solokh suggests a recognition, possibly tactical, of his authority among the Kabardians.

=== 17th century ===
In 1614, the Lesser Kabardian prince Mudar Alkhas, whose domains were located in the Darial Gorge, traveled to the court of Safavid Iran and concluded an alliance with the Safavid shah Abbas the Great against the Ossetians and Ingushs. As part of this political alignment, Mudar increasingly oriented his policies toward cooperation with Iran and openly demonstrated his loyalty to the Safavid ruler.

On 1 February 1615, an Astrakhan Tatar who had escaped from Mudar's captivity arrived in the city of Terek and reported that approximately thirty Persian soldiers had arrived together with Mudar and were residing in huts specially constructed for them in the prince's tavern camp. According to this report, Mudar openly boasted of his alliance with Shah Abbas, placing great hopes in Safavid support. In particular, the shah was expected to send a representative to secure the return of Mudar's son, who was being held hostage in Terek. At least, this was the version of events that Mudar himself communicated to other Kabardian princes.

Subsequently, Mudar moved his taverns into the Darial Gorge and blocked the Georgian Military Road. This action was undertaken specifically in order to maintain reliable communications with the Persian garrisons stationed in Georgia. In effect, the Greater Caucasus Range functioned as the northern frontier of Iran, and control over the Darial passage was of strategic importance. Mudar placed guards near his taverns and thoroughly fortified all of them, thereby strengthening his position in the region and securing Safavid influence in the central Caucasus.

As a result of these developments, in 1615 Shah Abbas, with the assistance of Kabardians under Mudar and Kumyks led by Ildar and Giray, launched an invasion of the Kingdom of Kakheti. The campaign ended with the conquest of Kakheti, further consolidating Safavid power in eastern Georgia and demonstrating the military and political significance of Kabardian and Kumyk cooperation in Abbas's Caucasian policy.

In 1615, a civil war broke out in Kabardia between the princes Sholokh and Qazi. Sholokh, supported by approximately 15,000 Nogais, launched an invasion against the domains of Qazi. Qazi initially resisted the attack with roughly 2,000 warriors and managed to oppose the advancing forces. However, during a subsequent engagement he was caught between two Nogai detachments and was ultimately defeated. Qazi himself was killed in the battle, along with several of his relatives, including prominent members of his family, and about 700 nobles who had fought on his side.

On the following day, Nogai forces entered Qazi's villages, which had been left without protection after the defeat, and set them on fire, devastating the settlements.

==== Civil War of 1639–1641 and era of Alejuqo ====
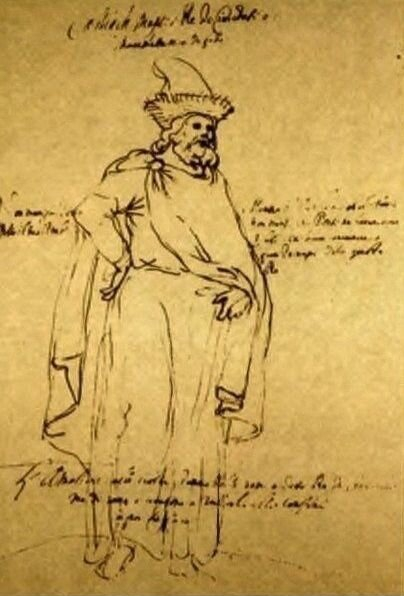
Alejuqo Shojenuqo by Teramo Castelli

Following the death of Sholokh Tepsaruqo in 1616, the title of Grand Prince of Kabardia passed to Qudenet Qambolet, a representative of the Yidar lineage. Although Qudenet received a royal charter and formal recognition from the other Kabardian princes, domestic political instability immediately flared. Alejuqo Shojenuqo, nephew of Qaziy Pshiapshoqo and leader of Greater Kabardia, launched a campaign against Talostaney backed by 3,000 Crimean troops. Following the military defeat of the Talostaneys, their leader, Qarashey Sholokh, and his two brothers attempted to seek refuge in Jilakhstaney, but were killed by princes Mudar Alkhas and Akhlo Aytech. Nevertheless, this did not prevent the Qaziy and Talostan families from subsequently forming a military alliance against the Yidars and their patron, the Tsar of Muscovy. The tsarist government secured pledges of loyalty from the Talostans and Qeytuqos, along with the delivery of hostages, only in late 1622, following a joint campaign into their lands by the Yidars and a Russian detachment from Terki.

In 1624, after Qudenet's death, the tsarist administration issued a charter granting the princely title to his brother, Pshimakho. However, Pshimakho's claim to the status of Grand Prince was rejected within Kabardia. Despite their sharp internal differences, the Talostans and Qeytuqos united for a long period in opposition to the Yidars, whose policies aimed to consolidate their own status at the expense of Kabardia's de facto independence. Yet, the Yidars had little alternative: they had to either accept the permanent loss of their domestic political influence or continue leveraging their Moscow connections as a powerful instrument against their rivals. Joint military operations by the Yidars and their Russian allies continued through 1626 and 1630. In 1631, after the death of Qudenet, the third consecutive representative of the Yidar family to hold power, Narchu Yelbezduqo received a royal charter to rule. As with his predecessor, however, his rights to the title and status of Grand Prince were not recognized in Kabardia, precipitating a deep crisis of supreme political authority across the realm.

The policies of the Yidars and their Russian backers ultimately stripped the title of Grand Prince of any practical significance. Lacking domestic recognition and denied the legitimate right of seniority in the eyes of the co-ruling princes, the last Yidar Grand Princes were powerless to halt political fragmentation or the secessions of Talostaney and Jilakhstaney. Meanwhile, Qaziy Kabardia, led by cousins Alejuqo Shojenuqo and Hatokhshoqo Qaziy, emerged as the most powerful feudal domain. Its leaders openly sought hegemony over the country, and the Yidars were unable to neutralize them through foreign diplomatic backing alone. Furthermore, the Yidars' own holdings became embroiled in intense rivalries between different branches of their princely house. The heirs of Sanjalay Kanklychev (who died in 1625) were backed by the Qeytuqos, with whom they intermarried. Sholokh Sanjalay, and after his death in 1636, his brother Mutsal Sanjalay, married Alejuqo's sister in accordance with levirate custom. Conversely, the Qambolet branch, which was demographically and militarily weaker, was supported by the Talostans and Jilakhstans. Mutsal Sanjalay's allies in Kabardia aligned with the Crimean Khanate and the Lesser Nogai Horde, both of which were openly hostile to Russia.

In 1635, an attack by Aidemir-murza, the future Shamkhal of the Shamkhalate of Tarki, resulted in the death of Kilish Sauslan, the last representative of his branch of the Yidar family. This triggered an immediate dispute over the inheritance of his feudal estate, which comprised eleven villages capable of mobilizing 250 noble horsemen and uorkis. The primary contenders were two distinct Yidar lineages: the descendants of Zhelegot (led by brothers Budach, Sholokh, and Alejuqo Sanjalay), who ruled a small, Moscow-vassal principality along the lower Terek River near the fortress of Terki; and the lineage of Qambolet, led by Chalimat Qudenet, successor to Qambolet Yidar and head of the Qambolet patronymic.

The Sanjalay brothers possessed powerful domestic allies, as Mutsal was married to the sister of Alejuqo Shojenuqo, co-ruler of Qaziy Kabardia. As the largest fiefdom in Kabardia, Qaziy Kabardia encompassed around 50 villages and could field over 1,000 armored cavalrymen alongside more than 2,000 infantry. Alejuqo and his cousin, Hatokhshoqo Qaziy, maintained close political ties with the Crimean Khanate and the Lesser Nogai Horde, pursuing an independent policy free from Moscow's control. By contrast, Chalimat Qudenet was the weakest of the Yidar princes, with a personal domain consisting of just four villages capable of fielding 35 uorkis. However, Chalimat enjoyed influential patrons in Moscow alongside powerful relatives across the North Caucasus. His brother, Yakov Kudinetovich Cherkassky, and his cousin, Ivan Borisovich Cherkassky (a maternal cousin of Tsar Michael Fedorovich's mother), occupied prominent positions at the Russian court. Chalimat was also the son of Babasupkh Alkhas, sister to Mudar Alkhas, the Supreme Prince of Jilakhstaney, making him a relative of Aidemir-Shamkhal, ruler of the Shamkhalate of Tarki.

In April 1639, Alejuqo Shojenuqo and Hatokhshoqo Qaziy destroyed the possessions of Chalimat Qudenet and his ally Narchu Yelbezduqo, capturing Chalimat's mother and two sisters. Budach and Mutsal Sanjalay were accused of treason for disobedience and secret correspondence with Safavid Iran, leading to their exile from the Terek River into interior Russia; however, their younger brother, Alejuqo Sanjalay, escaped to Kabardia and assumed control over the disputed Yidarey lands. The leaders of Qaziy Kabardia appealed directly to Tsar Michael I, citing the right of Dmitry Mamstryukovich Cherkassky to dispose of the disputed Yidarey estates, and threatened to defect to the Crimean Khanate if Moscow provided unconditional support to Chalimat. The Russian court rejected this tone, and in September 1640, sent a stern reply asserting its authority as supreme overlord and formally accusing Alejuqo and Hatokhshoqo of disloyalty.

In the spring of 1641, Chalimat's mother and sisters were rescued without a major engagement when approximately 3,000 Big Nogai warriors under Prince Dmitry Gochakov were dispatched to Kabardia. However, freeing the captives and transferring Chalimat's subjects to Talostaney failed to resolve the core political dispute. Escalating the feud, the anti-Russian faction turned to hired assassins. As Babasupkh Alkhas reported, Princess Zhelegosha and Alejuqo Sanjalay collaborated with Qaziy Kabardia and Lesser Nogai allies to hire a Tatar assassin named Chinkireik, who was sent to kill her son Kelmametek (Chalimat). In May 1641, Alejuqo and Hatokhshoqo launched a direct assault on Mudar Alkhas's holdings, resulting in Mudar Alkhas's assassination. On May 29, 1641, Qaziy forces and their Lesser Nogai allies invaded Chalimat's lands, inflicting roughly 30 casualties among the Yidar nobility, capturing over 270 prisoners, and seizing extensive livestock.

These events pushed the conflict into a general war. A funeral feast for Mudar Alkhas initiated a broad mobilization led by Chalimat Qudenet and Aidemir-Shamkhal, assembling a coalition estimated at 5,200 men. This force included 1,200 Big Nogai warriors under Saltanash Aksakov and Khoroshai Chubarmametev, 1,100 Circassians (including 300 from Jilakhstaney), 50 Bragun Kumyks, 2,350 troops from the Shamkhalate of Tarki, and a Russian contingent from Terki consisting of over 300 to 500 service men, Cossacks, and streltsy under Artemy Shishmarev. On the opposing side, the combined army of Qaziy Kabardia and the Lesser Nogai Horde numbered slightly over 2,000 men. The strike force consisted of 1,350 heavy armored Circassian cavalry led by Alejuqo Shojenuqo, Hatokhshoqo Qaziy, and Alejuqo Sanjalay, alongside 800–900 Nogai horsemen under Soltan-murza Kasayev.

The conflict culminated in the Battle of Malka on July 12, 1641. The coalition army advanced along the left bank of the Malka River toward Pyatigorye, where Chalimat's vanguard under Aidemir-Shamkhal quickly overran Lesser Nogai outposts in the It-Almas tract and dispersed to capture sprawling livestock herds. Prince Alejuqo Shojenuqo executed a feigned retreat tactic, instructing his Nogai vanguard to fall back and lure the coalition deeper into the terrain. As the coalition army broke formation to plunder, Alejuqo's hidden armored cavalry emerged in three heavy columns from a mountain gorge, striking the coalition's rear and encircling the three separated enemy groups. The engagement turned into a complete rout. In a desperate attempt to break the encirclement, horsemen and foot soldiers leaped into a steep, deep ravine along the Balk (Malka) River, where most were killed or drowned. Virtually all primary coalition commanders perished, including Chalimat Cherkassky, Aidemir-Shamkhal, Yeldar Aybak, and the Strelets commander Artemy Shishmarev. Out of more than 300–500 Russian servicemen deployed from Terki, only 22 survived. Several hundred coalition troops were captured, including princes Tatarkhan Aslan and Akhle Aytech.

The victory at Malka prevented Dagestani hegemony over the North Caucasus and preserved Kabardian autonomy. However, fearing a large-scale Muscovite punitive expedition following the destruction of the Russian garrison, Alejuqo and Hatokhshoqo made the strategic decision at the end of 1641 to temporarily resettle Qaziy Kabardia across the Kuban River under Crimean protection. Realizing that the vacant Beshtaugorye lands were attracting warlike Kalmyk tribes and threatening the isolation of Terki, the Russian government sought to normalize relations. In 1642, Moscow recalled Alejuqo's exiled brother-in-law, Mutsal Cherkassky, restored his titles, and dispatched him to negotiate the return of the Kabardians. Following successful negotiations, Alejuqo took an oath of allegiance to Russia on the Koran in his own name and on behalf of his allied murzas and uzdens. In return, Alejuqo was assigned the largest royal stipend in the Caucasus, guaranteed immunity for trade and diplomatic convoys, and safely returned his people from the Kuban region to Beshtaugorye, establishing Qaziy dominance over Kabardia while restoring formal diplomatic ties with Moscow.

===== Crimean and Kalmyk invasions =====
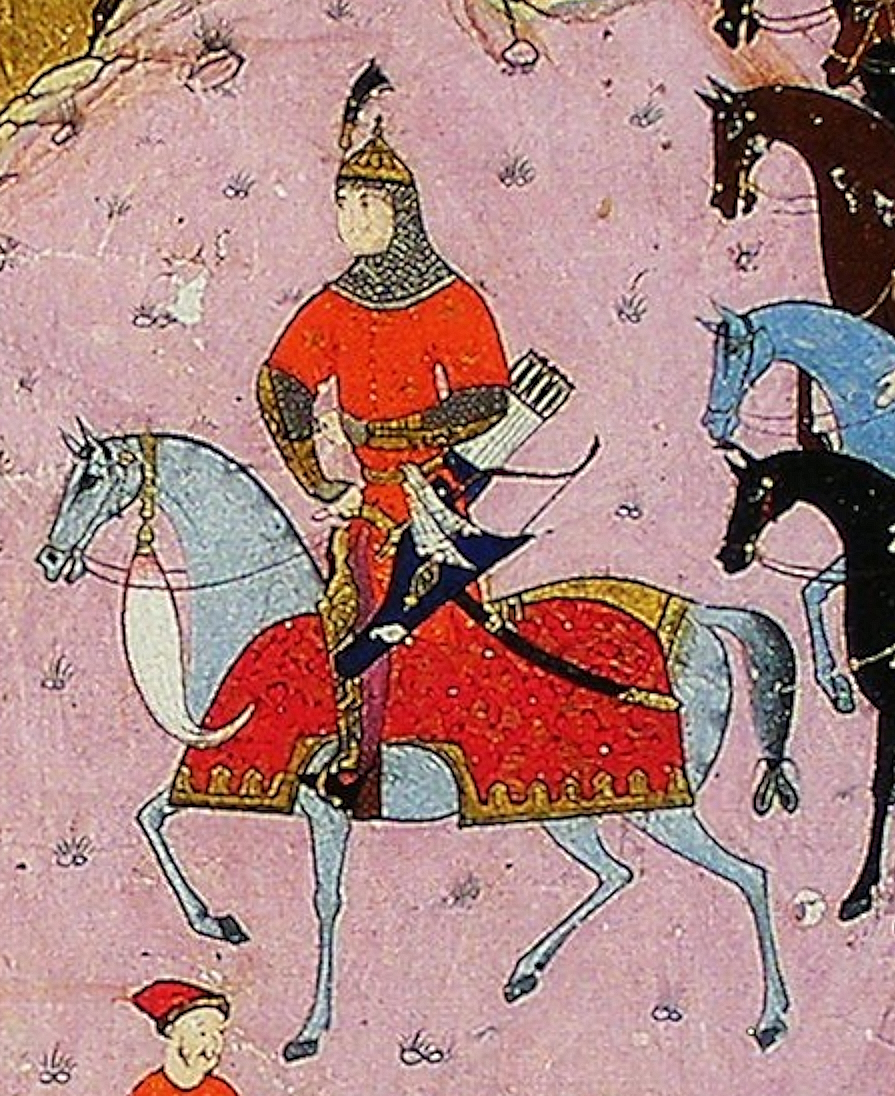
Janibek Giray

In the 17th century, the Northeastern Caucasus became one of the main theaters of military operations for the Crimean Khanate. Numerous attempts by Crimean Tatar forces to penetrate Transcaucasia were carried out along the North Caucasian route, which passed through Circassia and Kabardia. Such campaigns were undertaken in 1606, 1608, 1616, and 1635. For example, in 1607 the Crimean Khan Ğazı II Giray spent the entire winter in Circassia, attempting to draw it into the political orbit of the Ottoman Empire or win it over to his side. These expeditions were typically accompanied by heavy fighting, the destruction of settlements, and the capture of thousands of prisoners and livestock, making this period particularly difficult for the Circassians. In many cases, Circassia was forced to resist the superior forces of the Crimean Khanate, which was often supported by the Ottoman Empire. According to R. Trakho, Moscow's interest in the Caucasus declined after the Time of Troubles, and before the reign of Peter the Great there were almost no significant political or military actions between Russia and the Circassian lands. In 1616, the Ottoman Sultan decided to launch a new campaign through the North Caucasus toward Iranian territory. Crimean Tatar forces moved first through Kabardia, and the arrival of Janibek Giray prompted the Great Nogai Horde to join the campaign. Around 3,000 Crimeans and 9,000 Nogais from the Ishterekov ulus took part. Further campaigns against Kabardia were undertaken in 1619, 1629, and 1631. Their main goal was to draw the Kabardians to the Crimean side, and these expeditions were accompanied by plundering and devastation of the population and lands. At the same time, the Crimean and Ottoman authorities accused their supporters among the Kabardian feudal elite of treason and of defecting to the side of the Moscow tsar, something that often occurred due to difficult political circumstances. Even after the Ottoman defeat in its struggle with Iran in 1639, the devastating raids of the Crimean khans on Circassia and Kabardia continued. In 1640, a Crimean army of about 14,000 men carried out a winter campaign against the lands of the Circassian prince Adzhikumuk, but he managed to successfully repel the invaders.

In early 1644, after a skirmish with the Kalmyks, the Besleneys informed the Kabardians and Nogais that a Kalmyk army was advancing toward them. In response, the combined forces of the Kabardian princes, Nogai murzas, and some Abaza began fortifying their settlements and preparing for defense. According to Evliya Çelebi and Mustafa Naima, the allied force numbered about ten thousand men. Around mid-January 1644, Kalmyk detachments assaulted the fortified positions of the allied forces. The battle quickly became fierce, and the initial Kalmyk attack succeeded, inflicting heavy casualties on the coalition.

As noted by Evliya Çelebi, when the Kalmyk warriors encountered the Circassians and Nogais, they launched a sudden assault with cries of "Ho!", causing the Nogai and Kabardian forces to retreat. The Kalmyks pursued them deep into the mountains, where a second battle took place.

Historian Begeulov R. M., citing a report by the Italian Catholic missionary A. Lamberti describing a battle between 1630 and 1650 in which Svans and Karachays defeated an invasion by "unknown people," and Circassian oral traditions claiming that around 2,000 warriors from various mountain tribes joined the fight, suggests that Karachays, Balkars, and Svans likely assisted the coalition during this second battle. When the Kalmyks advanced into the mountains, allied marksmen armed with rifles, hidden in ambush, suddenly attacked them with volleys of gunfire. Evliya Çelebi described this ambush as resembling a "seven-headed dragon." The Kalmyk army was decisively defeated. According to a Russian document from 1644, the Kalmyks lost most of their leaders and elite command staff and suffered heavy losses. Evliya Çelebi claimed that about 20,000 Kalmyks were killed, another 20,000 captured, and more than 67,000 horses seized by the victors. Russian sources, however, report that only 1,500 to 2,000 of the Kalmyk army survived.

In 1671, the Crimean Khan again invaded Kabardia with a large force and remained in the region for more than eight months. The Kabardians, unwilling to submit yet unable to openly confront the Tatars, abandoned their homes and retreated to the mountains and fortified places, taking their possessions with them. The Crimean forces were left with only about fifty hostages and were eventually forced to withdraw after causing widespread devastation.

In 1699, the Crimean prince and kalga, Shahbaz Giray, was murdered in Circassia at the house of the Besleney prince Temir-Bulat. Reports suggested that he had been poisoned, although another version claimed that he was killed by rebellious Circassians. Suspicion also fell on Khan Davlet Giray, who had earlier used Circassian forces to defeat his rivals. However, the unrest that followed did not subside. The brother of the murdered kalga, Kaplan Giray, under the pretext of avenging Shahbaz Giray, carried out several devastating raids against the mountain regions. Some accounts also suggest that the murder may have been organized by Shahbaz Giray's own brothers.

=== 18th century ===
==== Battle of Kanzhal ====
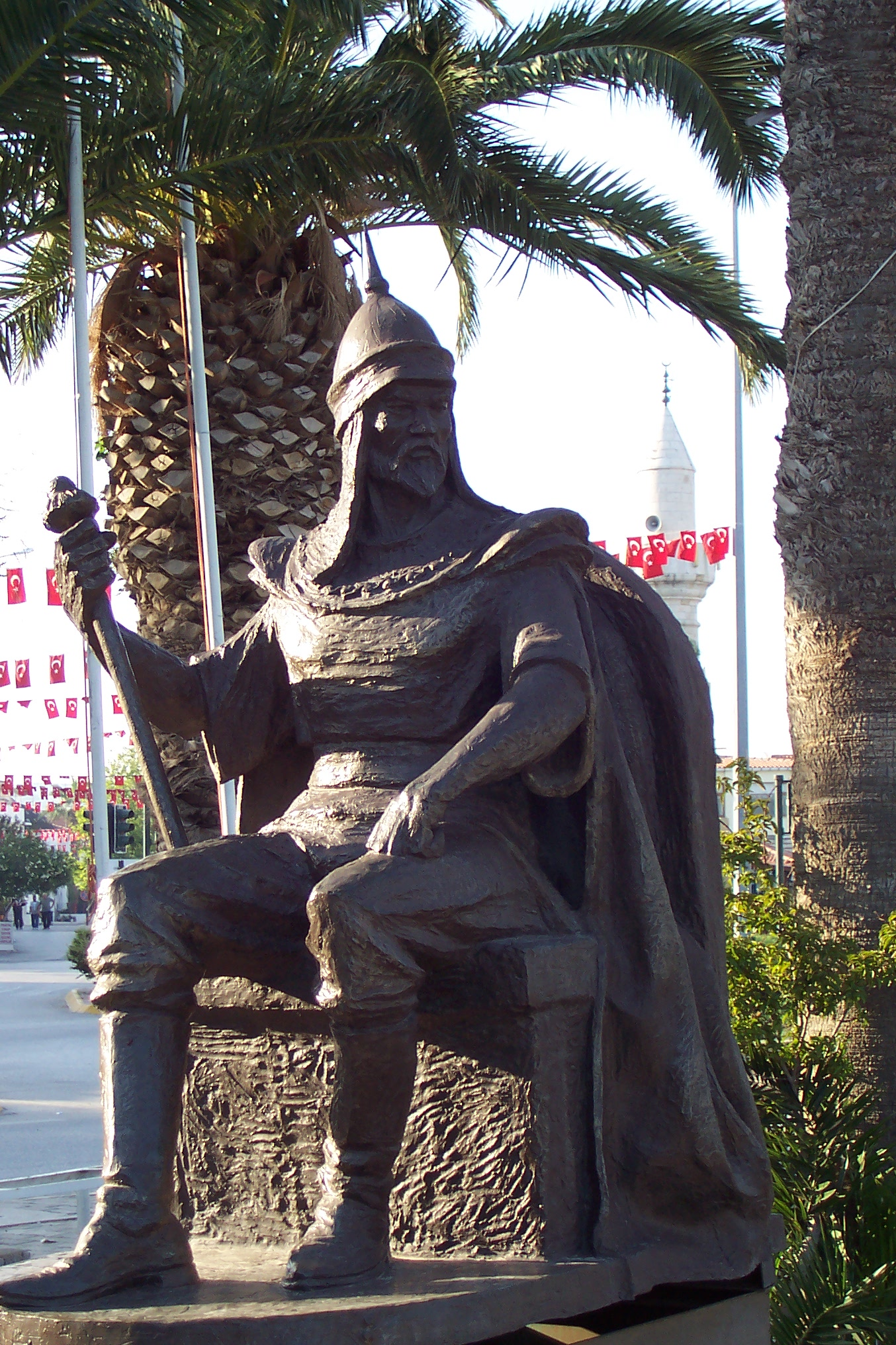
Cesme Center, Statue of the Crimean Khan Qaplan I Giray

The killing of a member of the Giray dynasty prompted retaliation from the Crimean Khanate. In 1700 and again in 1701, Crimean forces under the command of Shahbaz Giray's brother Kaplan Giray launched major punitive expeditions into Circassian territory, ostensibly to avenge the murder but also to plunder and capture tribute and slaves. Fearing reprisals and blood vengeance, those held responsible for Shahbaz Giray's death fled from Besleney to Kabardia. Following pressure and retaliatory attacks from the Crimean Khanate, several hundred Besleney families, together with their leaders, sought refuge in Kabardia, where they were granted protection by the Kabardian prince Qeytuqo Jambulat.

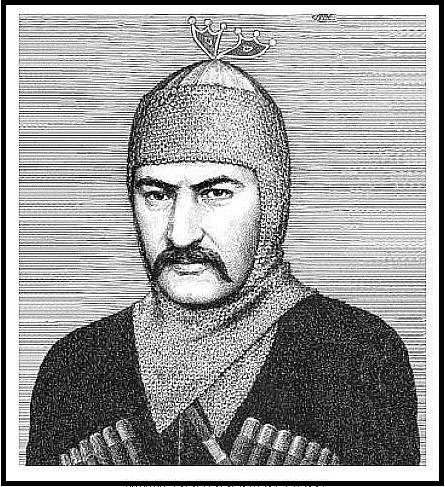
Kurghoqo Hatokhshoqo

In 1708, Sultan Ahmed III supported the Crimean Khan Qaplan I Giray and authorized a punitive campaign against the Kabardians. Ambassador P. A. Tolstoy reported from Constantinople that the Khan had received a decree from the Ottoman Porte ordering him to lead an army of thirty to forty thousand Tatars to devastate Circassia and burn its settlements. Qaplan I Giray began the campaign in the spring of 1708 and reached Kabardia during the harvest season. Rather than advancing deep into the country, he moved toward the region near Mount Elbrus and established his camp along the upper reaches of the Malka River in the area known as Lower Kanzhal. The site had been used by earlier Crimean khans and offered abundant pasture, clean water, and natural protection from the surrounding terrain. Behind the camp lay the Malka River and the nearby Babukin ford, the only easy crossing in the area. The Kabardian princes, led by the supreme prince Kurghoqo Hatokhshoqo, decided to resist the invasion. A general mobilization was proclaimed, and according to contemporary reports even boys as young as fourteen were called to arms. Kabardia was able to field between 7,000 and 30,000 men, though historians generally estimate the effective force at about 10,000 to 15,000 warriors, many of them noble cavalry. Recognizing that a direct confrontation with the larger Crimean army would be disastrous, the Kabardians attempted negotiations while secretly preparing for resistance. Kurghoqo Hatokhshoqo offered to reduce the tribute, but the Khan rejected the proposal and demanded no fewer than three thousand captives. The Kabardians deliberately prolonged negotiations for nearly three weeks in order to prepare their defenses. The first stage of the fighting occurred in the Tyzyl Gorge, where Kabardian detachments lured part of the Crimean force into a narrow mountain pass through a feigned retreat. Once the enemy cavalry entered the gorge, the Kabardians attacked from the slopes, firing arrows, rolling stones and tree trunks onto the trapped troops, and striking the immobilized cavalry. A later record preserved in the Russian Board of Foreign Affairs described how Crimean and Kuban forces were drawn into the mountains and suffered a crushing defeat, with many dying in battle or from hunger. Fighting continued for several weeks through repeated engagements and guerrilla-style attacks. According to the Kabardian commander Pshi Tatarkhan Bechmirza, the clashes with the Crimeans lasted between one and two months.

The decisive battle occurred in September 1708 when the Kabardians launched a coordinated night attack on the Crimean camp near the Malka River. Kabardian scouts silently eliminated enemy pickets and surrounded the camp before the assault began. According to several accounts, including those recorded by travelers such as Abi de la Motraye, a diversion was created by driving hundreds of horses with burning bundles tied to their tails into the camp, causing panic among the Crimean cavalry. As the frightened animals ran through the camp, confusion spread among the soldiers, who believed disaster had struck them unexpectedly.

Taking advantage of the chaos, Kabardian forces attacked from several directions and overwhelmed the disorganized Crimean troops. The Crimean army was routed, and Khan Qaplan I Giray himself was wounded and forced to flee the battlefield.

According to Kabardian accounts, around 11,000 Crimean soldiers were killed, while many others were captured or scattered in the mountains. The Kabardians captured artillery, including fourteen cannons and five mortars, along with thousands of horses and large quantities of weapons and supplies. The defeat was severe. Kalmyk Khan Ayuka later confirmed to a Russian envoy that many of the Khan's leading murzas had been killed and that the Khan's own son had been taken prisoner. Russian reports noted that only about half of the Crimean seymens survived the campaign. It reportedly took the Kabardians several days to bury the dead and divide the captured spoils. News of the defeat reached Constantinople by the end of October 1708, confirming the failure of the Crimean campaign against Kabardia.

==== Civil War of 1720–1736 ====
As a successor state to the Golden Horde, the Crimean Khanate claimed sovereignty over Circassia. This political relationship was characterized primarily by the obligation of Circassian princes to pay tribute to the Crimean Khan, predominantly in the form of slaves. This tribute was demanded upon the ascension of a new Khan to the throne or levied as fines for crimes committed by Circassian subjects. When Circassian leaders refused to deliver the required number of captives, the Crimean leadership launched punitive military expeditions to enforce payment. These raids were justified by labelling the Circassians as "infidels". This justification became complicated from the 16th century onward as the Circassians increasingly converted to Islam; however, Crimean Khans often ignored these conversions and rejected negotiations with Circassian envoys who pleaded over their shared religion.

Despite the presence of Islam, there was debate over whether the region was Dar al-Harb (the Abode of War), where slaves could be taken, or Dar al-Islam (the Abode of Islam), which would prevent enslavement. Despite some legal rulings (kanunname) suggesting Sharia should apply to certain tribes (which would protect them), the Ottoman state supported the Crimean Khan in enslaving Circassians, treating the region effectively as a source of slaves regardless of religious affiliation. It was not possible to determine whether the Circassians entering the Ottoman market were from Dar al-Harb or not, as both allied Muslim Circassians and non-Muslim Circassians were raided by the Khanate. The Circassians were described as "neither Christians nor Muslims" by a courtier of the Crimean Khan. Some Ottoman chroniclers mention that the Circassians fought against the Crimean Khanate because they could not stand the "Tatar tyranny and oppression" (Turkish: zülm ü cevre). In some cases, the Circassians pleaded with the Ottoman sultan directly, arguing that they were fellow Muslims, thus it was therefore "against the sharia to turn them into slaves". The Sultan withdrew permission for the Khan's campaigns based on this argument, although the Khan proceeded regardless.

In 1720, the Crimean-Circassian war of 1720-1726 started, complicated by the civil strife between the Anti-Crimean Kashkatau Party, which Aslanbech was a part of, and the Pro-Crimean Bakhsan Party.

In 1720, Saadet IV Giray (as revenge for the Kabardian invasion of Kuban and Chechnya) invaded Kabardia with 40,000 troops, demanding allegiance to the Ottoman Empire and Crimean Khanate, 4,000 jasyrs, and restitution for past losses. Pro-Crimean princes capitulated, while Kashkatau party leaders fortified the Cherek Fortress. A khasa was convened, attended by princes, Tlekotlesh, and representatives of the peasants. They discussed the current situation and the dispatch of an embassy to St. Petersburg. The Misosts' supporters prevailed at the meeting; reasonable proposals were rejected, and it was decided to accept the Crimean terms and pay a shameful tribute of 1,000 yasyrs "for the dishonor" of Kaplan Giray, "and if he, the khan, were to march on Kabardia, they would give nothing." They sent ambassadors with this proposal to the khan, who executed them and moved his troops across the Kuban. Those who disagreed with Yislam Misost's decision united around Aslanbech and his supporters and retreated into the mountains.

The Qeytuqo and Bechmirza families, representatives of the Jambot clan, according to V.N. Sokurov, left with their people for Kashkatau. In other words, Aslanbech returned to his former possessions and built the Cherek town.

The Crimean Khan sent a thousand well-armed seimen soldiers to Kabardia under the command of Salih Giray, the Sultan. By mid-June 1720, the Crimeans were encamped on Kyzburun. Salih Giray accepted the oath of allegiance to Crimea from the Misost and Hatokhshoqo families, in confirmation of which he demanded hostages and the payment of tribute in slaves.

Saadet Giray IV presented the following demands to the Jambot clan:

- Severance of relations with Russia
- Acceptance of Crimean citizenship and payment of a tribute of one yasyr from each household
- Relocation to the Kuban region

The first three points were mandatory; if they were not fulfilled, the khan threatened to destroy their homes, burn them down, and execute everyone. However, the Kabardians categorically refused all demands. Aslanbech's group declared that the Kabardian princes had never been under Crimean rule, but had long been allies of Russia and served it faithfully. After this, Salih Giray Sultan gave the order to attack Kashkhatau. On June 24, 1720, the Crimean detachment stood at Tatartu.

At the end of June, the Crimeans attacked the lands of the Kabardians. They destroyed villages, trampled crops and "burned the hay in stacks". The fortress "Chereksky Gorodok", built in a relatively short time in the Kashkatau tract, was besieged. Kabardians also took part in the attack and siege; Pshipshoqo Hatokhshoqo led 1,000 horsemen against Aslanbech. The besieged found themselves in a difficult situation. While there is no definitive information about losses in manpower, it is known that the Crimeans stole about three hundred horses, a thousand cows, and five thousand sheep. Soon, serious disagreements arose between the Jambots. The Bechmirzas proposed reconciliation with the khan, the Misosts, and the Hatokhshoqos. Aslanbech categorically objected, but the majority sided with the Bechmirzas. Then Qeytuqo declared that he himself would immediately go to the Russian Tsar for help. On the way to Terek, Aslanbech managed to conclude a military-political alliance with the Shamkhal of Tarki, Adil Giray, and the Kalmyk Khan, Ayuka Khan, about which he notified the Terek commandant, V.I. Zaozersky. On July 4, 1720, upon arrival in Terek, Qeytuqo submitted a letter to the commandant in which he stated:

"The Kabardians have all joined forces and driven me out of Kabardia, and if your grace writes about me, do not trust them and do not separate me from the great sovereign."

The Bechmirzas soon revised their decision: they sent for Aslanbech and brought him back. By mutual consent, at the end of July 1720, Prince Sultanaliy, Aslanbech's maternal brother, was sent to St. Petersburg to see the tsar. Sultanaliy's departure soon became known in the enemy camp. A visit by the khan's envoy, Agha Ismail, to the Cherek town followed. He was primarily interested in the reason for sending an ambassador to the tsar. The answer was straightforward: for help. An argument ensued, and ultimately Agha Ismail's diplomatic mission failed.

Soon the Crimeans launched another attack, prompting the Jambots to appeal to the Russian government to expedite military assistance. The princes' message, as well as the testimony of Kabardian ambassadors taken before the Collegium of Foreign Affairs, detailed the disasters and devastation brought by the Crimean Khan and urgently requested the construction of a Russian fortress in the Beshtamak tract of Kabardia. Informing the government of the impending danger, the princes wrote:

"If this winter there is no help or helping hand for us, then we report that we will not be yours, for our strength is gone against such enemies... And if, by the permission of your royal majesty, Kabardia and the Kabardian peoples are of no use to you and you are a great sovereign, please inform us and we will defend ourselves as best we can"

The siege of the Cherek town dragged on. Ultimately, all efforts by the Crimeans and the noble militia of the Misosts and Hatokhshoqos to capture the fortress proved futile. In December 1720, the khan and his army retreated from that town to the Kuban. Having established his camp there, Saadet Giray began sending detachments throughout Kabardia to collect tribute. As a Russian source states: "The best wealth was cattle, but the Crimeans robbed them all of it."

The behavior of the khan's troops provoked acute discontent among the country's population. Archival sources report that in November 1720, Shirin Bey, together with Pshiapshoqo Hatokhshoqo, drove "500 cows" and several thousand sheep confiscated from the population to feed the Crimean Khan. Informed of this promptly, the nobles of Aslanbech launched a surprise attack, routing them and taking back the livestock, which served as a pretext for intensifying military action. The Crimeans and the nobles of the Misosts and Hatokhshoqos again stormed the fortress without success. Moreover, during the attack, Pshipshoqo along with 15 Crimean and Kabardian nobles were killed, and 100 were wounded. The noble Crimean Tatar Mubarek Shirin Bey, who was higher in rank than a murza, was captured by the besieged forces, seriously wounded, and died inside the fortress.

In early December 1720, an envoy from the Kalmyk Khan Ayuka arrived in Kabardia. In accordance with a secret order he received from A.P. Volynsky, he gathered information on the country's internal political situation. The Kalmyk envoy first visited Kyzburun, the headquarters of Hatokhshoqo Misost. Here he met with the Crimean sultans Salih Giray and Abaz Giray. The latter declared that they were still at war with Qeytuqo, did not want peace, and urged him to capture Prince Aslanbech by deception and give him to them, promising 30 slaves and 30 suits of armor as a reward. The envoy agreed "for appearance's sake" and told Aslanbech everything. The conspiracy hatched against Qeytuqo culminated in a major clash on the Nalchik River in January 1721.

Over 2,000 warriors participated in the battle on the side of the Jambots. Salih Giray's detachment consisted of approximately 1,000 horsemen, while Yislambech Misost fielded 700 nobles. During the battle, most of the Kabardian nobles suddenly defected to Aslanbech Qeytuqo's side. As a result, the Crimean troops were routed and fled from Greater Kabardia. At the site of the battle alone, the Crimeans left 360 dead. Retreating, the Crimean detachments and the Misost nobles decided to fortify themselves in the Qudenet villages on the Chegem. However, the local population did not allow the Crimeans and their Kabardian princes into their homes and drove them away.

From 1722 to 1724, conflicts continued. The Bechmirzas and Qeytuqos remained besieged in the Kashkatau area, defending themselves entirely with their own resources. In 1724, Aslanbech Qeytuqo asked for military aid from Peter I. After receiving no answer to his request, he started to strengthen his ties with the new Crimean khan, Mengli II Giray. At this point, Peter the Great shifted his favor toward the Bakhsan faction, which caused the Kashkatau party to ally with the Crimeans, effectively leading both parties to swap their international allegiances.

Following this change in Crimean leadership under Meñli II Giray, Aslanbech Qeytuqo sought a rapprochement with Bakhchisarai. A political realignment followed, and alliances were reinforced through marriage between the Qeytuqey family and the Crimean ruling house. The new khan appointed Bakhty-Girey as serasker in Kuban, who in turn negotiated an agreement with Aslanbech for the seizure of supreme authority in Kabardia and its incorporation under Ottoman influence.

These plans were ultimately disrupted. The Kabardian statesman Jabagh Qazanoqo played a key diplomatic role in maintaining peace and restoring relations with Russia. Under his influence, Yislambech Misost convened a khasa (council), which resolved to send an embassy to Peter the Great. The emperor received the delegation, relations were restored, and military assistance was again promised.

In April 1725, despite these diplomatic turns, the Bakhsan leaders Yislambech Misost and other Hatokhshoqo princes ultimately capitulated and surrendered to Aslanbech at the Pshiqo encampment. The Kashkatau faction achieved a temporary victory over the Russian-supported Bakhsan party.

Following the defeat of the Bakhsan party in April 1725, the political situation in Greater Kabardia fell into disorder. For the first time in decades, Kabardia was forced to pay regular tribute to the Crimean Khanate, while Crimean troops remained stationed in Kabardian territory. Although Prince Aslanbech Qeytuqo had achieved victory over his rivals, his position soon became unstable. Qeytuqey's dependence on Crimean military support damaged his reputation among the Kabardian nobility. Before 1724, he had been known as a strong defender of Kabardian independence and an opponent of Crimean influence. His later cooperation with the Crimean Khanate caused many nobles to turn against him. The Bechmirzas, who had previously supported the Kashkatau coalition, abandoned Aslanbech and joined the remaining leaders of the defeated Bakhsan faction, creating a rare alliance between former rivals.

Without the support of the Kabardian princes, Aslanbech Qeytuqo quickly lost his authority. Hoping to preserve his position, he requested a redistribution of lands and subjects from the ruling princes, but his request was rejected. Isolated politically and left without allies, Aslanbech fled Kabardia together with his brother and son, seeking refuge in the Crimean Khanate.

After his exile, Aslanbech turned to the Kuban sultan Bakhti Giray for help, swore allegiance to him, and gave his daughter in marriage. Bakhti Giray, relying on the Crimean Khan's power, ravaged Greater Kabardia and began forcing the Kabardian princes to submit to his authority, demanding their resettlement to Kuban. In 1729, during another campaign against Kabardia, the Kuban serasker Bakhti Giray was killed in battle together with his brother Murad Sultan.

In 1730, the Ottoman Sultan removed the Crimean Khan Mengli Giray from power and reinstated Qaplan I Giray. His rival for the Khan's throne, Salih Giray, fled to his father-in-law, Prince Yislambech Misost. He took with him 2,000 Nogai families, approximately 35,000-40,000 people. Qaplan Giray, in turn, recognized Aslanbech Qeytuqo as the sole claimant to the throne of Kabardia, who in turn received a 19,000-strong army from the Khan. Aslanbech, in turn, swore allegiance to the Khan and promised to bring the entire region into submission.

In the summer of 1731, Crimean troops led by Arslan Giray and Aslanbech approached the borders of Kabardia. They demanded a ransom "for the blood" of the two sultans (Bakhti and Murad), at the rate of one yasyr from each household. The Vali of Kabardia, Yislambech Misost, frightened by the real threat of invasion by Crimean troops led by his rival Aslanbech Qeytuqo, expressed his willingness to recognize Russia's protection over Kabardia and convened a khasa to discuss the matter. The deputies unanimously agreed to swear allegiance to Russia to the new empress. In accordance with the decision of the imperial court, the commandant of the Holy Cross fortress, General D. F. Yeropkin, advanced Russian troops to the borders of Kabardia. The Crimeans began a retreat, eventually being defeated by the combined forces of Salih Giray's Kabardians and Nogais.

In 1732, the senior prince-vali of Kabardia, Yislambech Misost, died. The Kabardian princes gathered for a council (khasa) to elect a new prince-vali. Overriding the rights of the elder Aslanbech, his cousin Tatarkhan the Golden, who enjoyed Russian support, was elected senior prince. His opponent, Aslanbech, was in Crimea at the time and held a pro-Crimean orientation.

In 1737, Aslanbech Qeytuqo plotted against Tatarkhan, allying with the princes of the opposing faction (the Hatokhshoqo and the Misosts). Tatarkhan fled with his brothers to Astrakhan. Through the mediation of the Russian authorities, who highly valued his loyalty, the senior prince of Kabardia and his brothers returned to Kabardia and reconciled with Aslanbech.

In the summer of 1737, after the death of Tatarkhan, Aslanbech was elected the new Grand Prince of Kabardia. That same year, through the mediation of the Kalmyk Khan Donduk-Ombo, a reconciliation was reached between the leaders of the Kashkatau and Bakhsan parties, the two most powerful Kabardian princes, Aslanbech and Bemat. Aslanbech, elected senior prince of Kabardia, swore an oath of allegiance to Russia.

Jabagh Qazanoqo personally led the election campaign for Aslanbech, resulting in his victory. After Aslanbech became the prince, Qazanoqo was his closest advisor and influenced Aslanbech's Pan-Caucasian views. The first action of Prince Aslanbech was to introduce the principle that "only one state should exist between two seas" (the Black Sea and Caspian Sea) Aslanbech advocated for unification with other regions of the Caucasus, but did not have enough time or opportunity to fully implement this principle.

===== Russo-Circassian War (18th century) =====
Regional historians often mark the completion of the Mozdok fortress on July 17 (28), 1763, as the beginning of the Russo-Circassian War, which lasted 101 years. Following the instructions of Catherine II, the fortress was built in a strategic location situated on traditional livestock migration routes. According to Russian claims, one primary reason for building the fortress was to protect Russia's new Christian subjects. A prominent figure among them was Kurghoqo Qanchoqo, a Lesser Kabardian prince who sought Russian protection alongside his subjects and took the baptismal name Andrey Kanchokin-Cherkassky. Many Kabardian serfs began escaping to Mozdok to receive baptism in exchange for money and special privileges from Russia. Kabardian princes such as Qasey Hatokhshoqo and Misost Bematuqo sought to remove the fortress by sending delegations to Russian officials and seeking help from the Ottoman Empire and Crimea.

Kabardian princes viewed the foundation of Mozdok as an attack on their sovereignty, and in 1764, a delegation led by Prince Qeytuqo Kaysin traveled to St. Petersburg to demand the destruction of the fortress. However, Empress Catherine II refused these demands, stated that Mozdok was Russian territory, which was canceling the independent status previously recognized by the 1739 Treaty of Belgrade. After Russia refused to return the escaped peasants, many Kabardian nobles moved away from the Russian border toward the mountains and formed alliances with Western Circassians, as well as with the Ottoman Empire and the Crimean Khanate. Internal conflicts began within Kabardia as peasant uprisings occurred with the support of the Russian military. These movements further destabilized the social structure of the region.

Between 1765 and 1767, the first military clashes occurred as Russia intervened in local sovereignty. This led some Kabardian elite to begin migrating west toward Trans-Kuban. In response to the construction of the Mozdok fortress, Kabardian leaders collaborated with Western Circassians, including the Besleney and Chemguy, to plan attacks on Russian fortifications and organized a siege of the Kizlyar fortress in 1765.

During the Russo-Turkish War (1768–1774), Kabardian leaders such as Misost Bematuqo and Hamirza Qeytuqo sought to maintain their independence and joined the war. In 1769, Kabardian units clashed with Russian troops commanded by General de Medem at the Eshkakon site, located along the upper reaches of the Kuma River. The 1772 Treaty of Karasubazar between Russia and the Crimean Khanate formally declared Kabardia as a subject of the Russian Empire. This sparked immediate backlash from prominent Kabardian princes, who intensified their efforts to destroy the Mozdok fortress. By early 1773, under the leadership of Misost Bematiqo, the Kabardians began military preparations and sought an alliance with Devlet Giray, the newly appointed Ottoman-backed Crimean Khan, in direct opposition to the pro-Russian Sahib Giray. By 1774, a unified military force consisting of Kabardian units and Crimean Tatars gathered along the banks of the Malka River. While volunteers from various surrounding regions joined the cause, the backbone of this army was the heavily armed Kabardian cavalry. During a high-level council meeting involving Shahbaz Giray, Nekrasov Cossack commanders, and local leaders, a coordinated strategy for the assault on Mozdok was finalized.

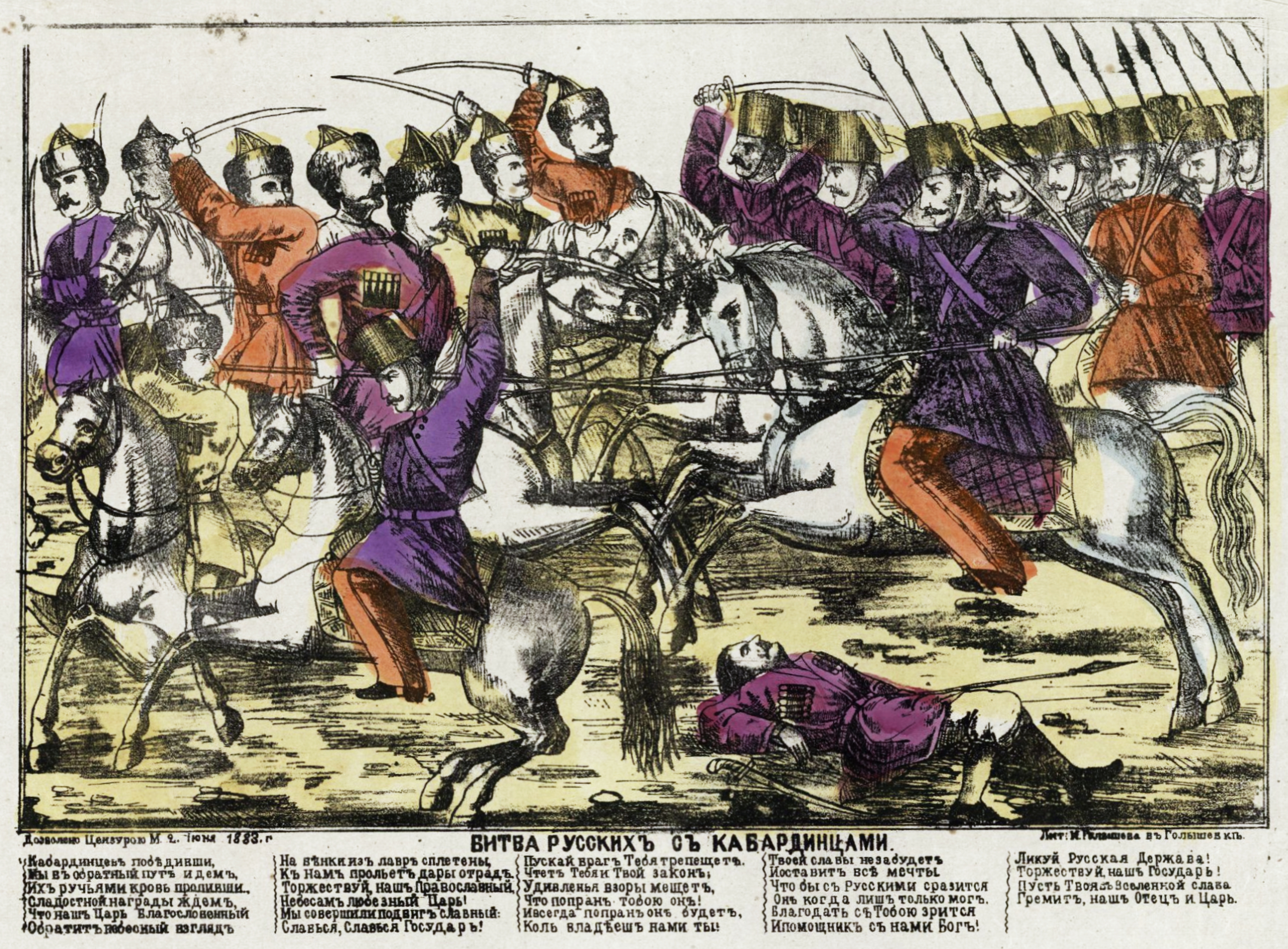
Illustration for the novel "The Battle of the Russians with the Kabardians, or The Beautiful Muslim Woman Dying on Her Husband’s Grave" by Nikolai Zryakhov (1840).

In June 1774, Kabardian forces led by Misost Bematiqo and other leaders engaged the Russian army in a major pitched battle along the banks of the Gundelen River. In the same month, units that included the Kabardian leader Kurghoqo Tatarkhan launched a heavy assault on the Naurskaya redoubt. The forces maintained a siege of this Russian position for twelve hours before withdrawing.

Mozdok's presence led to a fierce joint offensive with Crimean forces against the Mozdok until the end of the Russo-Turkish War. On 21 June, 1774, the Treaty of Küçük Kaynarca was signed. This agreement legally incorporated Kabardian lands into the Russian Empire and ended Kabardian sovereignty in official terms. The Kabardians did not accept this status, arguing that their relationship with Russia was based on friendship or hospitality rather than subjecthood.

Following the conclusion of the Russo-Turkish War (1768–1774) and the signing of the Treaty of Küçük Kaynarca, the Russian Empire sought to consolidate its southern frontier and establish permanent strategic control over the North Caucasus. While the treaty formally declared Kabardia an independent territory, Imperial authorities interpreted the accord as granting St. Petersburg exclusive influence over the region, severing traditional Kabardian ties with the Ottoman Empire and the Crimean Khanate.

To secure its strategic interests, Count Grigory Potemkin, President of the College of War, ordered the construction of a continuous military boundary stretching over 500 kilometers from Mozdok to Azov. On May 21, 1777, General Ivan Yakobi was appointed commander of the Caucasus Corps, replacing General Ivan de Medem, with specific instructions to enforce the construction of the Azov-Mozdok Line. The project involved building ten major fortresses, including Stavropol, Georgiyevsk, Pavlovsk, Alexandrovsky, and Marinskaya, linked by dozens of outposts, redoubts, and fortified stanitsas populated by resettled Volga and Khopyor Cossacks.

The placement of the fortified line passed directly through traditional Circassian lands, effectively severing Kabardian pastoralists from their fertile winter pastures along the Malka River and northern steppe zones, most notably the Qurey Plain (Kabardian: Къурей губгъуэ). The loss of these lands threatened the foundation of the Kabardian livestock economy. Furthermore, Russian garrisons restricted seasonal migrations and imposed customs duties on local trade routes. Between 1777 and 1778, Kabardian diplomatic missions sent petitions directly to Empress Catherine II, arguing that the construction of fortresses on sovereign land violated established treaties. When these diplomatic appeals were ignored by the Imperial administration, regional unrest escalated into open conflict.

Initial military skirmishes began in late 1777. General Yakobi received field reports indicating that allied Besleney and Chemguy Circassians under Kaziy Giray Sultan had assembled near Mount Beshtau, joining a force of roughly 4,000 Kabardian horsemen to monitor Russian construction columns.

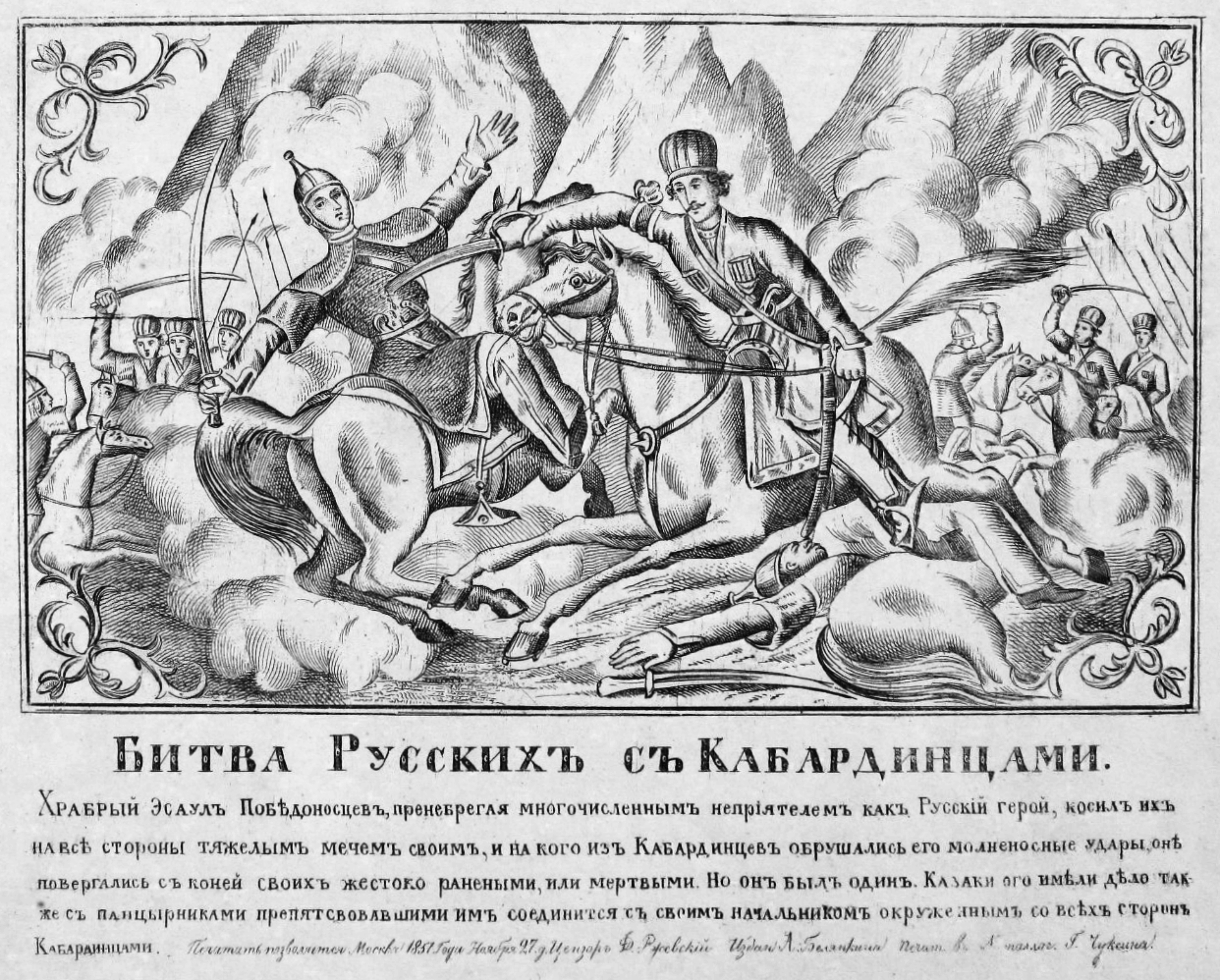
Illustration for the novel "The Battle of the Russians with the Kabardians, or The Beautiful Muslim Woman Dying on Her Husband’s Grave" by Nikolai Zryakhov (1840). "The brave esaul Pobedonostsev, disregarding the numerous enemy, fought like a true Russian hero, cutting them down in all directions with his heavy sword. Those Kabardians struck by his lightning-fast blows fell from their horses, severely wounded or dead."

In early 1778, hostilities broke out across multiple sectors of the line: Petrovsk Fort: In January 1778, a force of 3,000 Kabardian warriors attacked and seized Petrovsk Fort after the garrison evacuated under pressure. Pavlovsk Fortress: In June 1778, Prince Dulak commanded a body of 4,000 cavalry in a direct assault on the newly built Pavlovsk Fortress. The attack was repelled after an intense artillery engagement led by Colonel Baron Wilhelm von Asheraden. Stavropol & Arkhangelsk Redoubts: Throughout the remainder of 1778, Circassian raiding parties conducted continuous harassment against construction detachments, livestock herds, and supply wagons near Stavropol and Arkhangelsk.

Recognizing that localized raids could not halt the Russian fort network, Kabardian leaders began organizing a coordinated, national military alliance.

On March 29, 1779, a nationwide assembly (Khasa) of Kabardian princes (Pshi), nobles (Worq), and representatives from the neighboring Chemguy and Besleney principalities convened along the upper banks of the Baksan River.

The assembly was deeply divided over military strategy: The Moderate Faction: Grand Prince Jankhot I of Kabardia advocated for political diplomacy and vassalage, arguing that Kabardia lacked the manpower, heavy artillery, and economic reserves to endure a prolonged conflict with the Russian Empire. The Anti-Russian Faction: Led by Prince Misost Bematuqo and Prince Hamirza Qeytuqo, this faction demanded an immediate declaration of war to force the complete removal of Russian garrisons from their ancestral territories.

Circassian oral traditions record that when Banknot warned that "we are too few to challenge the state," the war council responded: "We are ready to die to be remembered in this old world, it is better for us to die with our honor." To enforce discipline, the assembly reinstated an ancient wartime law dictating that any noble or subject who refused to take up arms would be wrapped in wet black felt as a mark of public disgrace.

The assembly formally elected Prince Misost Bematuqo as Commander-in-Chief of the unified army. Prince Hamirza Qeytuqo was tasked with field operations, while Prince Qanemet Yelbezduqo was assigned to oversee intelligence and reconnaissance.

Following the council, the assembly drafted a formal declaration in the Tatar language and dispatched it to Major Dmitry Tuganov, commander of Mozdok Fortress. The letter demanded the immediate dismantling of all fortresses along the Azov-Mozdok Line and the withdrawal of Russian troops beyond the Terek River. When Lieutenant Colonel Yakim Chornin met Kabardian emissaries on May 1 to reiterate imperial control, Kabardian leadership formally severed all diplomatic relations.

Following the assembly, the Kabardian army established its primary strategic base in the densely forested valley of Qeytuqo Tuasha (Kabardian: Къетыкъуэ тIуащIэ) near present-day Psykhurei. Allied contingents of Chemguy, Besleney, Abaza, and Chechen warriors reinforced the main Kabardian force, bringing total mobilized strength to an estimated 10,000–15,000 men.

In late March 1779, Sultan Dulak spearheaded a surprise night assault on Marinskaya Fortress with 6,000–7,000 horsemen. The raiders killed 85 Don Cossacks, damaged external works, and recaptured over 5,000 head of stolen livestock before retreating into the foothills.

On May 12 [O.S. April 23], during Saint George's Day celebrations inside Alexandrovsky Fortress, an Armenian operative named Artemy Voskanyan, bribed by Prince Qanemet Yelbezduqo, set fire to large hay stores surrounding the garrison. The fire served as a signal for a massive Kabardian cavalry attack on the confused defenders, causing significant structural damage and casualties before Russian artillery drove the attackers back. Throughout May, coordinated strikes disrupted communications and targeted the fortresses of Stavropol, Alexeyevsky, and Kalinovsky, while Chechen allies engaged Russian outposts near Mozdok.

By early June, Prince Hamirza Qeytuqo assembled a strike force to cut off Russian relief columns moving along the Malka River. On June 8, Circassian forces surrounded Marinskaya Fortress and initiated formal siege operations, deploying 500 dismounted warriors to dig tactical approach trenches toward the defensive moat.

Upon receiving intelligence of the siege, General Ivan Yakobi assembled a relief force from Pavlovsk Fortress consisting of three infantry squares supported by field artillery and Cossack cavalry.

On the night of June 10, 1779, Yakobi's column deployed opposite the Kabardian lines. The Kabardians arranged their force into a single continuous formation spanning 4 kilometers. Over six hours of fierce combat, Kabardian elite cavalry launched repeated charges against the central infantry square where Yakobi was situated. However, disciplined Russian volley fire and canister shot prevented the horsemen from breaching the formations.

As the cavalry charges faltered, Captain Bas Y. led a sudden bayonet sally from inside Marinskaya Fortress, striking the Kabardian trench diggers from the rear. Caught between two fires, the Circassians were forced to retreat. The battle resulted in over 500 Kabardian casualties, including 50 prominent princes and nobles. Among the dead were the 74-year-old Prince Hamirza Qeytuqo and his son Ismel Qeytuqo.

Despite heavy losses at Marinskaya, Kabardian forces avoided decisive open-field battles throughout July and August 1779, shifting to hit-and-run tactics, burning supply crops, and severing courier routes. In response, Russian commanders reinforced garrisons along the line and deployed scouts to locate the main Kabardian war camp.

On September 27, Major General Fedor Fabritsian arrived at Pavlovsk Fortress with 8,000 battle-tested reinforcements, including heavy infantry regiments, Don Cossacks, and Kalmyk irregular cavalry. Learning that the main Kabardian army and its leaders were stationed at Qeytuqo Tuasha along the Malka River, Fabritsian and Yakobi devised a plan to encircle the camp.

On the night of September 28, Russian forces initiated a dual-column night march. General Yakobi positioned his infantry and field artillery along the northern bank of the Malka River to cut off retreat lines, while General Fabritsian led 1,000 Cossacks, 1,000 Kalmyks, and light infantry across the river to attack from the south.

At 7:00 AM on September 29 [N.S. October 10], Fabritsian launched a surprise dawn attack on the Kabardian camp. Cossack and Kalmyk cavalry rapidly stampeded and captured over 2,000 Kabardian horses grazing near the river, stripping the Circassian elite of their mobility.

Deprived of their mounts, roughly 250–350 high-ranking nobles and 50 princes formed defensive foot rings around the headquarters tent of Commander-in-Chief Misost Bematuqo. When offered terms of surrender, the Circassian nobles refused and engaged in hand-to-hand combat using swords (shashkas) and daggers (kindjals).

By 12:00 PM, Russian artillery and massed infantry fire completely destroyed the camp. Russian losses were reported as exceptionally light (around 36 killed across both columns), while nearly the entire assembled military and political leadership of Greater Kabardia was wiped out, including Commander-in-Chief Misost Bematuqo .

Following the disaster at Qeytuqo Tuasha, surviving Kabardian elders attempted to negotiate peace terms while retaining territorial integrity. General Yakobi rejected all conditional offers and launched a scorched-earth winter punitive campaign on November 27, 1779.

Russian columns under Colonel Ivan Savelyev advanced deep into Lesser Kabardia, while Yakobi's main force burned villages, grain stores, and livestock shelters across Greater Kabardia. Operating in sub-zero temperatures, the Russian army suffered over 1,500 non-combat casualties due to severe frostbite. However, the complete destruction of winter reserves left the civilian population facing mass famine.

On December 2, 1779, the remaining princes of Greater and Lesser Kabardia signed an unconditional instrument of submission at General Yakobi's headquarters.

The capitulation treaty signed in December 1779 imposed terms designed to permanently end Kabardian hegemony in the Central Caucasus:

- Heavy Livestock and Financial Reparations: Kabardia was required to deliver 2,150 high-bred war horses, 4,759 head of cattle, 4,539 sheep, and cash indemnity payments totaling 10,000 rubles.
- Surrender of Captives: Immediate return of all captured Imperial soldiers, Cossacks, deserters, and Christian subjects (including Georgian, Armenian, and Russian captives).
- Territorial Annexation: The strategic borders of Greater and Lesser Kabardia were formally fixed along the Malka River and Terek River. Kabardia permanently lost roughly one-third of its total ancestral territory, including all northern grazing plains and the Qurey Plain.
- Border Regulations: Circassians were strictly forbidden from crossing the Malka or Terek rivers, grazing livestock north of the border, or cutting timber without explicit written permits issued by Russian fort commanders. Aristocrats were limited to a maximum of two armed escorts when traveling near the border.
- Prohibition of Foreign Alliances: Kabardian princes were forced to sign solemn oaths severing all diplomatic, political, and military communication with the Ottoman Empire, the Crimean Khanate, and neighboring Chechen clans.
- Social Subversion of Feudal Hierarchy: In a clause designed to fracture Kabardian social structure, commoners (Tlhotqotl) were granted the explicit legal right to abandon their feudal lords and resettle freely near Russian fortresses and Mozdok without landlord interference or penalty.

The Seven Months' War was catastrophic for Kabardia. According to official reports submitted to St. Petersburg by Count Grigory Potemkin, over 2,000 Kabardian warriors died in combat during the seven-month campaign. Because Kabardian law dictated that horsemen of noble rank led charges in battle, casualties fell disproportionately on the ruling aristocrats.

Contemporary historical assessments estimate that over half of Kabardia's princely families (Pshi) and elite warrior class (Worq) perished between March and December 1779, creating a power vacuum that ended Kabardia's centuries-old regional dominance over neighboring North Caucasian groups.

The defeat in 1779 marked a turning point in the Russian-Circassian War. By establishing permanent control over the Malka and Terek river lines, Russia successfully separated Kabardia from Western Circassian tribes (such as the Abadzekh, Shapsugs, and Natuhays), preventing the formation of a unified Circassian state.

By 1784, Russia established four new fortifications in Lesser Kabardia. In response to this pressure, some local leaders joined the movement of Sheikh Mansur in 1785 and moved their settlements to Chechnya.

In 1793, the Russian government created "Class Courts" to establish administrative control. Kabardians resisted the Russian control by demanding Sharia courts, which initiated the Sharia Movement in 1794 under the leadership of Adildjeriy Hatokhshoqo, Ishak Abuqo and Ismail Hatokhshoqo. In 1799, the main leader of this movement, Prince Adildjeriy Hatokhshoqo, fled to Trans-Kuban to organize the resistance. In 1807, the Russian administration acknowledged that military force alone was not achieving its goals in the region. As a result, they temporarily allowed the creation of Sharia courts, known as mehkeme, to help maintain order and manage local affairs.

In the late 18th century and the beginning of the 19th century, plague outbreaks occurred in the region. These epidemics are estimated to have destroyed 90% of the population, which fundamentally weakened the ethnic and political structure of Kabardia.

=== 19th century (Russo–Circassian War) ===
The construction of the Kislovodsk fortification in 1803 and the establishment of new Cossack settlements in the Pyatigorsk region increased military pressure by restricting Kabardian transport routes. In May 1804, Kabardian forces conducted defense and counter-attack operations against the advancement of General Glazenap. These military engagements took place along the banks of the Baksan River on May 9 and the Chegem River on May 14. In the same year, 7,000 Kabardian warriors led by Sharia movement leaders, including Adildjeriy Hatokhshoqo and Ishak Abuqo, engaged General Glazenap's army in a major battle along the Malka River.

General Glazenap destroyed 92 villages between 1804 and 1805, while Generals Bulgakov and Delpozzo destroyed 200 villages, 111 mosques and seized over 50,000 animals in 1810.

During the campaigns of Glazenap and Bulgakov, Russian forces used "scorched earth" tactics, which the destruction caused widespread famine. A plague epidemic between 1804 and 1825 severely reduced the Kabardian population in Kabardia from approximately 300,000 to nearly 35,000.

==== Kabardian raids ====
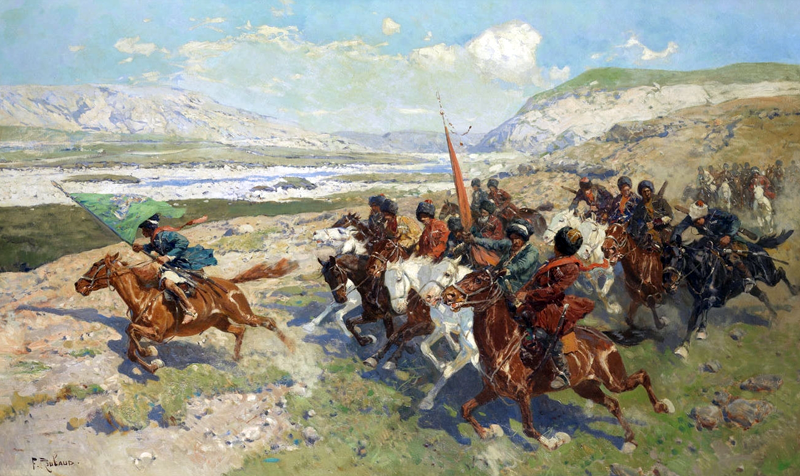
Franz Roubaud, The Circassian Raid (1890)

In 1810, Kabardian cavalry coordinated with Chechen units to launch raids on the Russian-controlled barracks at Priblijnaya and Prohladnaya. These actions were part of a broader effort to disrupt Russian military infrastructure in the region. From 1807 to 1810, Russian forces maintained a central military and economic blockade over Kabardia, during which period armed resistance and clashes continued. Until 1810, leaders like Prince Albaksid Qanchoqo carried out attacks against Russian units near the Georgian Military Road.

By the 1820s, though outwardly submitting, the Kabardians shifted their tactics: instead of open, mass uprisings, they began organizing swift attacks in small, raiding bands, inflicting constant damage on the border population. The humane policies of General Delpozzo, who succeeded Bulgakov, failed to stop the raids and were instead perceived as weakness.

This volatile state of affairs confronted Aleksey Yermolov upon his appointment as Commander-in-Chief of the Caucasus in 1816. Yermolov recognized that religious inflence backed by the Ottoman Empire (the Sublime Porte) had systematically alienated the local population from Russia by replacing traditional customs with Islamic courts, thereby diminishing the authority of native princes and best families. Deprived of traditional status, noble young men turned to raiding along the Caucasian Line. Traveling to Tiflis in 1816, Yermolov stopped at Georgiyevsk, where he met with several Kabardian princes. He received them cordially but warned them sternly that they must restrain their uzdens (nobles) from border plunder. Expecting little compliance, Yermolov demanded hostages and explicitly warned that raiding would cost those hostages their lives. He simultaneously cracked down on the complacency of the Don Cossacks guarding the posts. A clear example occurred on the night of October 9–10, 1816, when about fifteen Kabardian raiders attacked a mill near the village of Prokhladnaya. The raiders killed three sleeping Cossacks, captured a man and a woman who had brought grain for milling, and escaped undetected. Despite rifle fire and screams, neither the nearby Cossack outpost nor a post station half a mile away intervened, likely due to sleeping guards or fear of engagement. Outraged by this gross failure of border defense, Yermolov immediately placed both outpost officers on court-martial, establishing a precedent of strict military accountability across the border cordon.

Throughout 1817 and 1818, border skirmishes occurred in rapid succession, illustrating the constant danger faced by Russian settlers and soldiers along the Malka River, Kislovodsk, and the Terek River. In the summer of 1817, a morning patrol from the Belomechetsky outpost identified horse tracks from four Kabardian riders. Eleven Cossacks under Ensign Karpov pursued them across the Malka, discovering four hobbled horses. However, the four Kabardians quickly mounted, opened fire, killing the lead Cossack instantly, and successfully fought off the eleven Cossacks with cover fire before escaping beyond the Baksan River. Yermolov strongly reprimanded Ensign Karpov for indecisive leadership. Similar audacity was shown on December 7, 1817, near Makhin Kurgan close to Kislovodsk, where a small party ambushed eight returning Don Cossacks, killing one, wounding two, and driving off their horses while the rest fled. Days later near Yekaterinogradskaya, seven Kabardians ambushed a retired Cossack named Gorshenev as he crossed the Terek in a canoe to tie up his boat, capturing him in broad daylight before his comrades could cross, and subsequently snatching a thirteen-year-old Cossack boy from the village gardens that same evening. In January 1818, six Kabardians ambushed an artillery sleigh carrying timber near Soldatskaya, driving off three horses despite being outnumbered by eight armed Russians, an event Yermolov condemned in his personal notes as sheer cowardice. Further raids occurred on April 12 near Pavlodolskaya, where raiders severely wounded a isolated Cossack with sabers after his horse was killed in an attempt to protect a hay cart.

The persistent instability compelled Russian detachments to track raiders directly to their sanctuaries, leading to high-profile reprisals against uncooperative villages. A prominent example was Tramov Aul, located ten miles from Konstantinovo, which served as a notorious base for raiders while claiming peaceful status. On the night of May 3–4, 1818, an ambush team of ten Cossacks under Esaul Savchinin set up a hideout at a key river crossing. Over the course of the night, two separate groups of returning Kabardian raiders were engaged by the ambush team. Both groups fled directly into Tramov Aul for safety. Russian forces under Captain Astakhov pursued the raiders into the village streets, killing three, but the village elders flatly refused to surrender the remaining fugitives. Because the village had suffered from plague the previous year, Astakhov refrained from entering houses directly and reported to Yermolov. Viewing the village as an unpunished hub of banditry, Yermolov ordered troops to surround Tramov Aul, evacuate its residents, burn the entire village to the ground, and confiscate its livestock to supply the border line. Yermolov issued a stern declaration to the Kabardian nobility, warning that any village harboring raiders would face complete destruction, confiscation of goods, and severe punishment. Meanwhile, General Delpozzo attempted a covert strategy to neutralize raiding leaders, ordering a Cossack commander to lure Prince Edik Aydemirov, one of the most prominent raid organizers, into a trap under the guise of trading stolen horses. Aydemirov and an associate were killed and thrown into the river, but his death failed to halt the incursions as new warlords immediately took his place.

Recognizing that punitive measures had failed to establish order, Yermolov personally traveled to Kabardia in October 1818, arriving at Prokhladnaya to meet over six hundred assembled Kabardian leaders, princes, and Muslim clergy. In a deliberate display of confidence, Yermolov traveled with a minimalist escort of just 180 infantrymen, two garrison cannons, and a small staff, addressing the assembly with severe warnings. To enforce systemic change, Yermolov replaced the aging Delpozzo with Major General Karl von Stahl, an energetic commander from the Tsitsianov military tradition. He also secured the removal of the civil governor, Malinovsky, combining military and civil authority directly in General Stahl's hands to eliminate bureaucratic infighting. Despite Stahl taking command at Georgievsk in early 1819, border life remained in constant turmoil. Raiders frequently hid in the terrain along the Kuma River for days; in one instance near Alexandrovskaya Sloboda, raiders seized seventeen horses in broad daylight, while near Nadezhdinskaya, two civilian hunters were shot from ambush. Desperate criminal elements from the Russian side also took advantage of the chaos. On Christmas Eve, ten runaway serfs belonging to Major Rostovanov stole five premium horses and an unattended herd near Pavlovskaya Stanitsa, fleeing past Cossack patrols all the way into the Chegem Gorge. Mistrust ran so deep that innocent civilians were often caught in the crossfire: near Soldatskaya, two peaceful Kabardian farmers traveling in an oxcart fled into the brush out of panic when approached by a patrol, resulting in a violent struggle where Cossack Bugaevsky held down one farmer while his comrade accidentally shot Bugaevsky in the leg while killing the farmer.

By 1820 and 1821, while Yermolov was occupied in St. Petersburg and General Stahl was tasked with constructing the Sunzha Line, Kabardian raids grew into large-scale military incursions. At Christmastide in 1820, a force of one hundred Kabardians attacked winter pastures at Bald Mountain near modern Pyatigorsk, driving off two hundred cattle under open gunfire. A lone Cossack named Dorofeev accidentally stumbled into the middle of multiple enemy pickets surrounding the Podkumok area, escaping only by charging through heavy crossfire on his horse, while a pursuing force of twenty-three Cossacks under Ensign Panteleev was outmatched and unable to stop the raiders from retreating into the mountains with their loot. In January 1821, a raiding party occupied Gorkaya Balka near Georgievsk, murdering several local peasants and Cossacks, including travelers Yegolnikov, Shein, and Zimin, while taking Zimin's grandson and two peaceful Kabardians captive. A Cossack force under Fifty-man Govorkov eventually tracked the party of fifteen raiders to the Belomechetsky outpost, engaging in a fierce firefight and recapturing twenty-two oxen as the raiders crossed the Malka. Later that year, twelve Kabardians ambushed eleven Armenian merchants traveling to the Fyodorovo fair near Sukhaya Padina, killing eight merchants, leaving one wounded, taking two captive, and looting their cartloads of merchandise. A brave counter-attack led by Cossack Officer Khlamov and twelve men pursued the raiders to the riverbank, fighting hand-to-hand to recover twenty-five packs of stolen goods, an act for which Yermolov promoted Khlamov to sergeant. By late 1821, influenced by Turkish emissaries spreading rumors of imminent war with Russia, the Kabardian nobility openly aligned against imperial forces. With the Sunzha Line completed in September 1821, Yermolov returned to the Caucasus prepared to initiate a decisive, large-scale military campaign across Kabardia.

==== Russian Campaign (1821–1822) ====
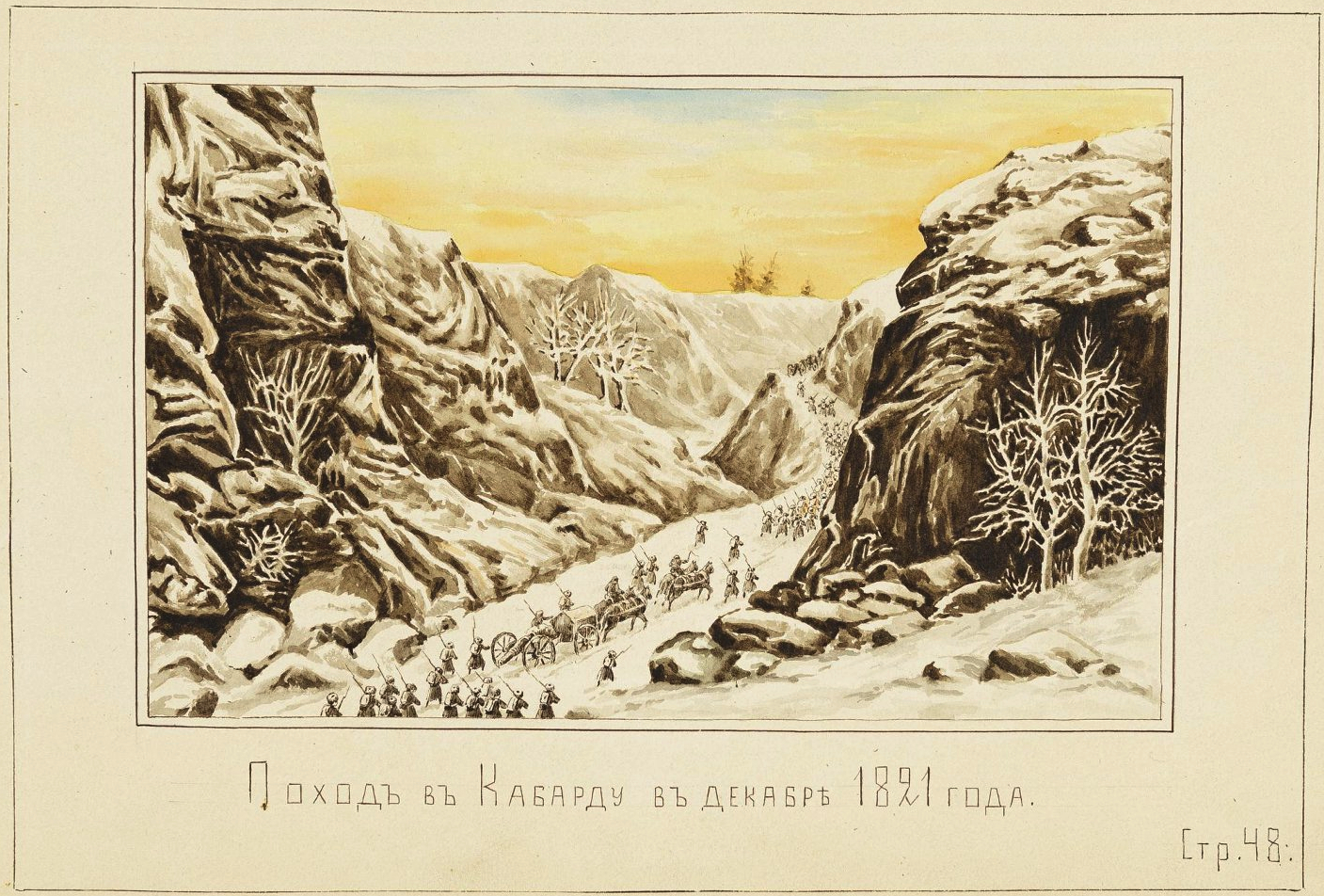
A Russian campaign to Kabardia in December 1821

The plague epidemic between 1803 and 1811 severely reduced the population. Between 1816 and 1822, General Yermolov implemented a policy based on military force. Yermolov forced the Kabardians along with the warriors relocate to lowland areas and took control of their mountain pastures.

In 1818, the construction of the Grozny and Nazran fortifications served to sever communication between Kabardia and Chechnya. The destruction of Tram village in 1818 started a new wave of migration toward Western Circassia. Between 1821 and 1822, intensive Russian campaigns targeted the center of Kabardia.

Between 1821 and 1822, Kabardians resisted the new fortifications built by General Yermolov within Kabardia. The resistance fighters retreated to the mountains and used hit-and-run tactics to harass Russian troops as they attempted to establish permanent control over the territory.

By late 1821, General Aleksey Yermolov, Commander-in-Chief of the Caucasus Corps, initiated a decisive offensive strategy against Kabardia. Previous Russian military operations had been largely restricted to passive defense along the Terek and Malka rivers due to ongoing conflicts in Chechnya and Dagestan. Yermolov proposed advancing the defensive line directly into Kabardian territory by constructing a chain of fortifications at the exits of key mountain gorges. This maneuver aimed to permanently isolate lowland Kabardian villages from militant Caucasian groups in the mountains and the adjacent Trans-Kuban region. To prevent Kabardians from wintering their livestock on the plains, Russian forces initiated mobile offensive raids ahead of the spring fortification campaign.

In late 1821, Staff Captain Tokarevsky led a company of the Kabardian Infantry Regiment from the Yelizavetinskoye fortification|Elizavetinsky Redoubt into the mountains, seizing enemy livestock and routing a Kabardian detachment with artillery grapeshot. On 15 December 1821, General Stal ordered an assault against three pro-Kabardian Abaza auls on the Kuma River, Mahukov, Khokhandukov, and Biberdov. A force comprising two companies of the Tenginsky Regiment and 300 Line Cossacks under Major Kurila breached the settlements. Cossack units led by Captain Virzilin, Yesaul Luchkin, and Ensign Starozhilov captured 1,000 head of livestock and 149 prisoners. A counterattack led by Prince Aslanbech Biyaslan was repulsed after Biarslanov was wounded, at the cost of 14 Russian casualties.

In January 1822, Colonel Katsyrev assumed command of a mobile force at Yekaterinogradskaya consisting of a 1,000-man battalion of the Kabardian Regiment, four artillery pieces, 200 line soldiers, 200 Chechen cavalry under Captain Chernov, and 100 Mozdok Cossacks. Katsyrev swept through Lesser Kabardia and Greater Kabardia, destroying anti-Russian auls including Boruk, Batash, Anzor, and Aliy. Despite harsh winter thaws, dwindling horse forage, and continuous skirmishing, during which Staff Captain Yakubovich was wounded, Katsyrev's forces disrupted local resistance between the Baksan and Terek rivers. Concurrent operations under Major Taranovsky resulted in the destruction of a 20-man Kabardian picket and the capture of over 500 livestock along the Shalukha River.

In late January 1822, a 500-man Trans-Kuban cavalry force led by fugitive princes Hatokhshoqo Bemat, Hamirza Jambolet, and Qarashey Qaziy crossed near Kamenny Most. They successfully escorted 250 families from the Zhantemirov and Tramov auls across the Kuban River. On 4 February 1822, the same party ambushed Ensign Teterevyatnikov near the Tanlytsky outpost. A responding Cossack relief force under Lieutenant Colonel Tarasov and Captain Kuznetsov was routed, resulting in 12 Cossacks killed, Captain Kuznetsov missing, and the total annihilation of a 10-man outpost under Sergeant Vagin. Throughout February and March 1822, Katsyrev launched retaliatory strikes into the Baksan and Tabashin gorges, razing five major auls, including the Kasayev settlement.

Yermolov issued formal proclamations offering amnesty to Kabardians who voluntarily abandoned the mountain gorges to settle on the lowland plains along the Terek, Urukh, and Baksan rivers. By March 1822, approximately 14 large auls comprising 945 households had relocated to the plains. However, the resettlement faced severe complications as settlers faced violent retaliation from mountain princes led by Aslanbech Besleney, and a friendly settlement was mistakenly attacked by Russian troops under Staff Captain Tokarevsky and Captain Chernov, prompting official reprimands from General Aleksey Velyaminov and compensation for the victims.

In late March and early April 1822, Katsyrev advanced into the Chegem River and Nalchik gorges. When Kabardian leaders refused to provide high-ranking prince hostages, Katsyrev destroyed the aul of Kasbulat on 4 April. During the engagement, both sons of Prince Aslanbech Besleney were wounded (one mortally), along with the senior Kabardian effendi. Simultaneously, Don Cossack Colonel Pobedny led 700 men across Kamenny Most into Abaza territory, capturing 6,000 sheep and a large horse herd, breaking through an enemy gorge ambush using artillery grapeshot near Batalpashinsk. On 17 April, Katsyrev stormed the stone saklya of Uzden Hajji-Tambiy along the Keshpek River, killing 18 defenders in hand-to-hand combat.

In May 1822, Yermolov personally led an expeditionary force of two infantry battalions, eight guns, and 300 Cossacks to clear the upper mountain gorges, operating alongside General Stal and General Velyaminov. During the advance up the Baksan Gorge toward Mount Elbrus, Russian troops encountered severe geographical obstacles along cliffside ledges above the Baksan River. When the path collapsed into a three-fathom-deep pit, soldiers of the Shirvan Infantry Regiment filled the chasm with their rolled overcoats to allow the battalion to jump across. A second Shirvan battalion discovered a narrow cliff fissure blocked by rock, dubbed "Yakubovich's Hole", where soldiers squeezed through single-file and Major Yakubovich briefly became stuck in the opening before being pulled through. Facing mountain artillery hauled up cliffside paths and multi-column encirclement, the primary Kabardian gathering near Xanthi dissolved, and key Kabardian leaders fled across the Kuban River into the Trans-Kuban region.

Following the summer expedition, Yermolov permanently bisected the region by constructing the New Kabardian Line in late 1822. Running along the foothills of the Black Mountains from Vladikavkaz to the upper Kuban, the line anchored five major fortifications at key gorge exits at Baksan, Chegem, Nalchik, Cherek, and Urukh. Intermediate outposts and restored fortifications at Kislovodsk, Podkumok, and Kamenny Most secured the central Caucasus line, permanently separating lowland Kabardians from mountain insurgents. In 1822, the office of the "Grand Prince" in Kabardia was officially abolished.

The "Kabardian Provisional Court," which was under Russian administration was established in Nalchik. The last Grand Prince of Kabardia, Jankhot Kushuk Bechmirza, was appointed as the first chairman of this court.

==== Revolt of 1825 ====
Following General Alexey Yermolov's extensive military campaigns throughout the region, severe political and social tension mounted among the Kabardian population resettled on the lowland plains. Highland Circassians and anti-Russian Kabardian factions repeatedly urged the lowland communities to abandon their lands under Russian administration and migrate beyond the Kuban River into the protective mountain gorges. Political discontent stemmed primarily from ongoing land allocation disputes, the systematic denial of traditional noble privileges, and the strict administrative and military controls imposed by Russian authorities. In 1824, local administrative friction increased substantially under Lieutenant Colonel Bulgakov, the newly appointed commander of the Kabardian Infantry Regiment. Concurrently, regional stability across the North Caucasus was further disrupted by the widespread uprising in neighboring Chechnya, the dramatic assassination of General Alexey Lisanevich, and a marked increase in Trans-Kuban cross-border raids. An extensive emigration movement developed across Kabardia as whole families and entire communities secretly relocated beyond the Kuban River to establish independent settlements in the highland regions. These remote communities frequently served as operational bases for raids launched against the fortified Caucasian Cordon Line. Internal judicial bodies within Kabardia, operating under traditional law, often refused to prosecute individuals accused by Russian officials of participating in these cross-border military raids.

Between 1822 and mid-1824, large-scale armed clashes on the Kabardian plain had largely ceased as local populations adapted to the new military oversight. However, on 14 September 1824, a party of six armed Kabardians attacked a family of Cossacks from the Volga Regiment who were returning from a hay field near the village of Maryevskaya (Soldatskoye). Cossack Rasskazov was killed during the immediate assault, his wife was severely wounded, and several family members were abducted across the Malka River. Russian Cossack patrols tracked the raiders back toward the aul of Uzden Atabech near the Zvezdenny-Brody redoubt, managing to capture six primary suspects following a brief skirmish and pursuit along the riverbank.

In late September 1824, while a primary Russian military force was deployed far beyond the Kuban River at Sagaush, a large raiding party composed of Shapsugs, Abadzekhs, and anti-Russian Kabardians bypassed several cordon posts along the upper Kuban. On 21 September, the raiding party successfully crossed the Kuban River near Kamenny Most and advanced rapidly along the Malka River valley. They were joined by prominent local supporters, including Jambolet Qushuq, the influential son of the Kabardian Grand Prince. On 29 September 1824, the combined raiding force launched a coordinated attack on an outpost positioned along the main road to Soldatskoye (Maryevka) during a period of heavy rain. Upon entering the village while most of the adult male residents were working in distant agricultural fields, the force engaged an Astrakhan Cossack guard post, killing twelve defenders and local residents during the opening engagement. Official administrative reports recorded eight civilians killed and 113 captured during the raid. The raiders thoroughly looted property, seized vast herds of livestock, and set fire to ten major structures, including the local prayer house, the medical hospital, and central grain stores, before making a rapid withdrawal across the Malka River toward the safety of the Baksan and Chegem gorges with their captives.

During their retreat into the narrow Chegem Gorge, the raiding force unexpectedly encountered a Russian military detachment commanded by Lieutenant Colonel Bulgakov, who was advancing directly from the Baksan fortification with a full infantry company and two field artillery pieces. Citing deep concerns for the physical safety of the numerous civilian captives tied to the column, Bulgakov chose not to engage the heavily laden horsemen, allowing the entire raiding party to retreat unmolested into the high mountains. General Yermolov strongly criticized Bulgakov's tactical decision upon receiving news of the encounter, publicly accusing him of cowardice under fire and immediately relieving him of his command over the Kabardian Infantry Regiment.

While positioned securely within the Chegem Gorge, elements of the raiding party executed further tactical maneuvers against local settlements along the Cherek River and Baksan River that remained loyal to the Russian administration. Prince Hamurzin raided several auls belonging to Uzdens Aslankirov and Kazanishev, stealing extensive livestock and abducting numerous residents. Prince Qushuq mounted an immediate pursuit with local levies, managing to recover a significant portion of the plundered goods. Simultaneously, Prince Bemat Hatokhshoqo led an armed force directly into the Baksan region, burning several settlements whose leaders refused to abandon the plain and forcibly moving the inhabitants toward the Chegem Gorge. In response to these developments, Major Taranovsky dispatched a multi-branch detachment from the Mechetki fortification. Russian forces engaged the raiding party between Mechetki and Kishpek, relying heavily on field artillery and concentrated small-arms fire to halt the highlanders' advance. Infantry units under Lieutenant Kablukov and Ensigns Voropanov and Kostin secured the adjacent strategic heights, forcing the highlanders to abandon their forward positions and retreat deeper into the Chegem Gorge. Taranovsky's force resecured the captured supply trains and intercepted a significant portion of the fleeing population, forcing them to return to their original settlements on the plains.

To avoid complete encirclement by converging Russian columns, which included Prince Bekovich-Cherkassky's detachment stationed at Kamenny Most, Major Rodionov's forces operating near the Zelenchuk passes, and Colonel Lukovkin's mobile patrols, a large section of the raiding party executed a grueling high-altitude retreat. They moved past Uruspievsky directly beneath the snowline of the main Caucasus ridge, eventually descending toward the Laba River basin and Mount Akhmed. However, several prominent anti-Russian Kabardian leaders maintained strong defensive positions within the key mountain passes. Shortly thereafter, a fast-moving party of 150 horsemen drove off over 2,000 horses from rich pastures along the Malka River that belonged to Prince Qushuq and other pro-Russian local leaders.

Subsequent military engagements and guerrilla actions occurred along both the Kabardian Line and the Right Flank throughout late 1824, 1825, and early 1826: On 18 October 1824, fourteen highlanders launched a swift attack on agricultural workers from Novosel'tsy, successfully capturing two peasants. On 25 October 1824, a raiding party attacked the isolated Velikanov farmstead located near Otkaznoye, resulting in three defenders killed and five captured. On 29 October 1824, a major 500-man mounted force led by Jembulat Boletuqo crossed the Kuban River near Prochny Okop, launching raids against farmsteads situated near Kamennobrodskoye and Sengileyevka. They captured several regimental horse herds before being engaged near Ovechiy Brod by a company of the Navaginsky Regiment and 100 Don Cossacks under the command of Esaul Dutkin, who successfully recovered 170 stolen horses after a bitter fight. On 18 December 1824, Jembulat led another massive 500-man party across the Kuban River near the Romanovsky outpost, striking out toward the Chalbas River valley. Alerted by a chain of signal smoke beacons, combined Cossack reserves from the Kazan, Tiflis, Temizhbekskaya, and Caucasian line regiments under Prince Bekovich and Lieutenant Colonel Zaleshchinsky pursued the raiding force for 35 miles across open steppe, inflicting heavy casualties and forcing an immediate retreat back across the line. On 29 March 1826, a critical supply convoy carrying military ammunition and food provisions from Yekaterinograd to Vladikavkaz was heavily ambushed near the Ardon outpost by a large mounted party of highlanders. Non-commissioned officer Puchkov quickly organized the defense, forming a tight wagon square with 35 line soldiers and civilian drivers. The escort successfully repulsed numerous mounted charges over several continuous hours, suffering 14 killed and wounded before the attackers finally withdrew from the field. Emperor Nicholas I subsequently promoted Puchkov to the rank of ensign and awarded George Crosses to all surviving members of the escort unit. On 12 May 1826, a group of 40 Kabardian horsemen led by Prince Besleney Hamirza advanced from Chechnya directly onto the Kabardian plain to reignite local resistance. Intercepted by a patrol of 20 Volga Cossacks, they were forced to withdraw into the cover of the Cherek Gorge before moving south toward Digoria.

In late 1825 and continuing into mid-1826, Russian military authorities carried out targeted retaliatory campaigns and executed several key political figures associated with the widespread unrest, including Jambolet Qushuq, the influential son of the Grand Prince of Kabardia. The military actions of 1826 effectively marked the final major period of organized, armed anti-Russian resistance on the Kabardian plain. In subsequent decades, the direct implementation of Russian administrative organs and military governorships systematically reduced the traditional judicial and political authority of the Kabardian princely class, leading to permanent structural changes in local social hierarchies and the long-term stabilization of the lowland territory.

==== Aftermath ====
By the end of 1822, the center of Kabardia was completely occupied by Russia. During this period, between 13,000 and 20,000 Kabardians fled to Trans-Kuban. Between 1810 and 1830, many Kabardian aristocrats who refused to submit to Russian rule moved to free territories in Western Circassia, particularly along the Laba River. These Kabardians are referred to in historical sources as "Hajrets", and they continued their resistance from there.

In April 1825, Russian forces destroyed a major Hajret village belonging to Prince Karamirza Aliy Misost, causing over 1,000 civilian deaths. In September, Hajret forces responded by destroying the village of Soldatskoye. Following the destruction of Soldatskoye, Hajret Kabardian and Western Circassian forces executed a strategic retreat known as the Ice Crossing to escape Russian encirclement. The cavalry units traveled approximately 120 kilometers across the freezing and high-altitude passes of the Greater Caucasus Range. This maneuver is considered a unique achievement in the history of the Caucasian War, as the Circassians maintained military discipline under extreme weather conditions and constant pursuit to successfully reach independent territory.

In June 1828, a large Circassian cavalry force of 3,000 men, primarily composed of Hajrets, broke through the Russian border line. During this operation, they destroyed the Russian village of Nezlobnoye located in the center of Kabardia.

On November 15, 1830, a major raid was launched against the Ersakonskoye fortification. This attack was led by Kabardian nobles living in Western Circassia, such as Muhammad-Mirza Botash. In May 1831, the Hajrets initiated a major two-pronged operation aimed at rescuing the population remaining in occupied Kabardia and relocating them to the independent territories of Trans-Kuban. The first column was led by the brothers Aslandjeriy and Pshimakhua Beslan, while the second was commanded by Muhammad Hatokhshoqo and Bechmirza Dokhshuqo. To counter these persistent insurgencies, the Russian-established "Kabardian Provisional Court" was forced to mobilize two separate local militia units consisting of 800 and 600 men.

By the 1830s, Kabardia was under complete Russian military control. Russia's command over the communication routes in Kabardia played a key role in the failure of Imam Shamil's attempts to unite Western Circassia and the Eastern Caucasus during the 1840s and 1850s.

In April 1846, Imam Shamil led a military expedition into Kabardia to establish contact with Western Circassians and create a united military line. However, he couldn't receive the expected support from the majority of local Kabardian princes in Kabardia and was forced to retreat to Chechnya after the battles.

Following the official end of the war in 1864, a large portion of the surviving Kabardian population was exiled to the Ottoman Empire during the Circassian genocide.

== Government ==
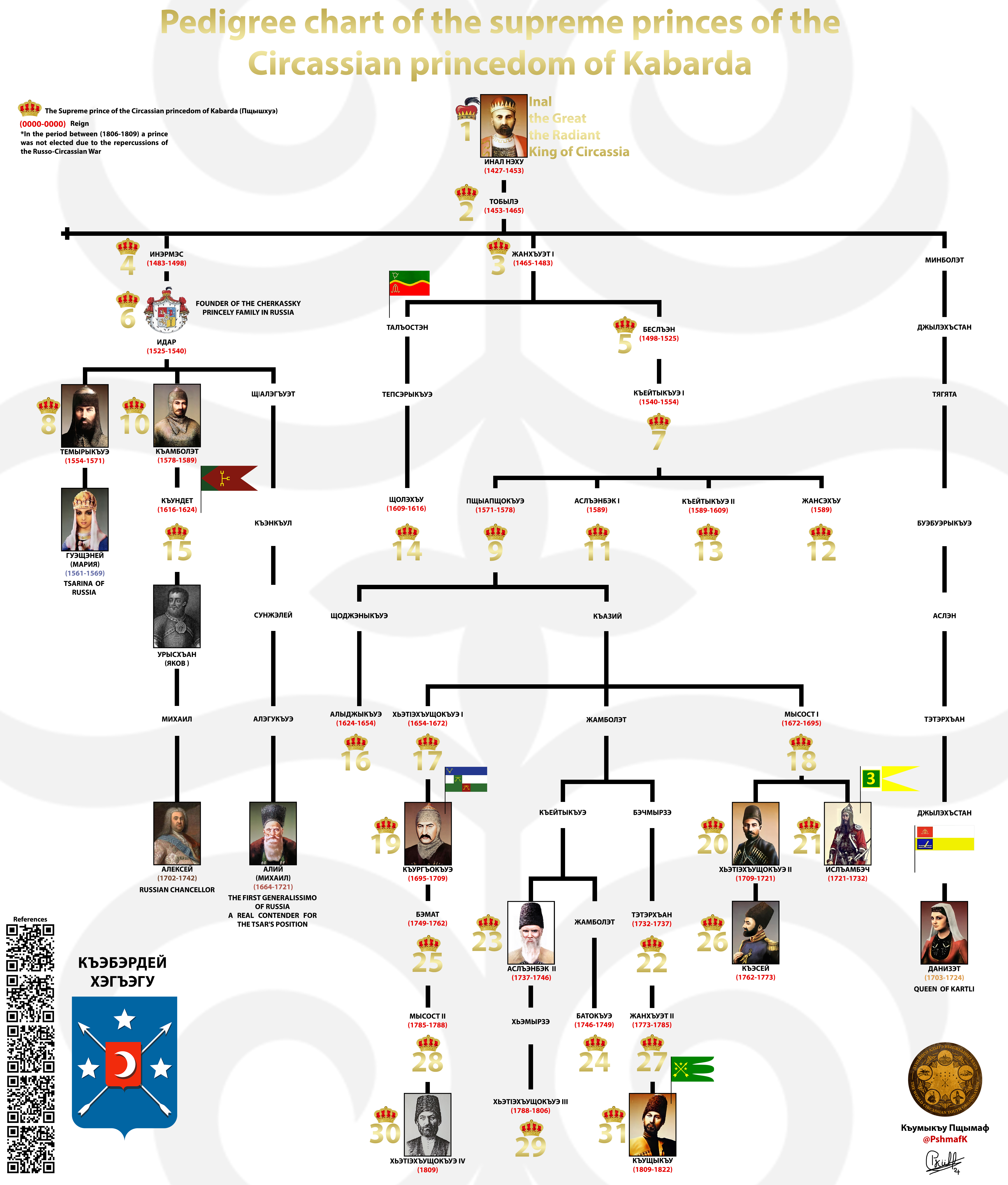
Princes Of East Circassia (Kabardia)

The Kabardian administrative system from the 16th to the early 19th century was a complex structure combining elements of a representative monarchy and a federal princely republic. This system rested on three primary pillars: the Grand Prince (Pshishkho), the Assembly (Khasa), and the High Court (Khey).

=== The Grand Prince (Pshishkho) ===
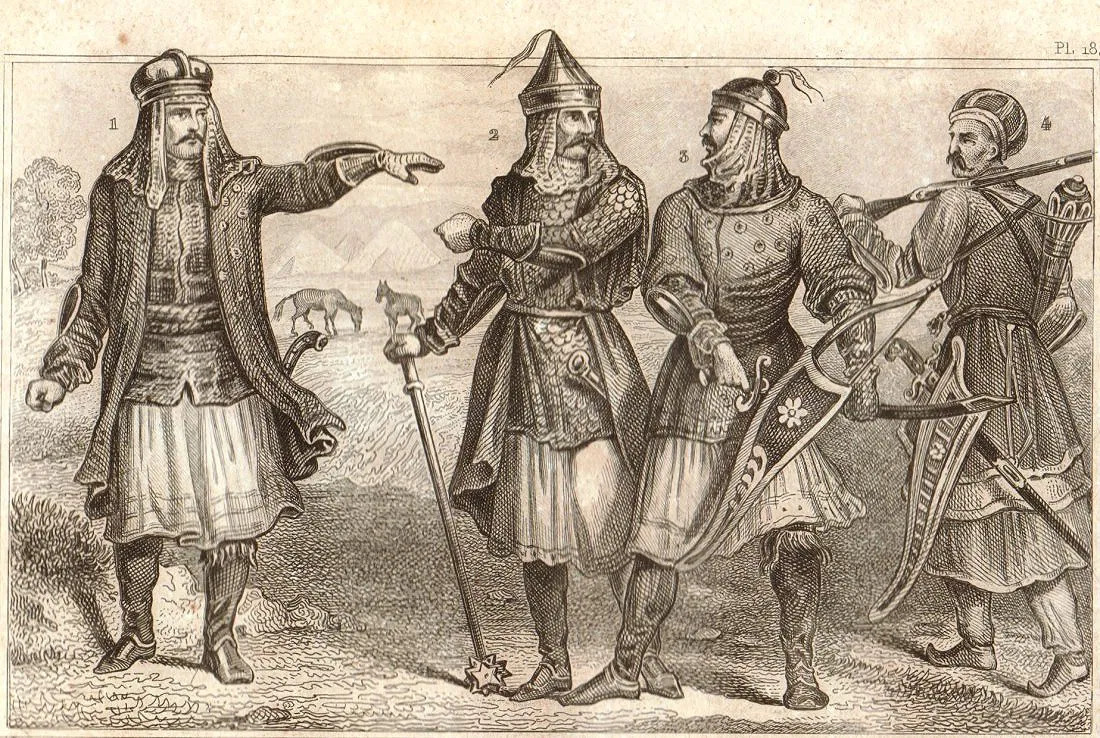
(left to right) Prince of Greater Kabardia, Circassian Khan, Noble from Greater Kabardia, Prince of Lesser Kabardia

The executive power was led by the Grand Prince of Kabardia, also known in Russian sources as the "Chief Prince". This position was not hereditary from father to son in Kabardia, it passed through a lateral succession system to the eldest and most capable member of the Inal dynasty. The selection involved identifying the eligible family line and obtaining confirmation from the General Khasa. The Grand Prince chaired the assembly and the court, managed foreign relations, and served as the commander-in-chief during wartime, though his authority required consultation with other lords.

=== The Assembly (Khasa) ===
The Khasa served as the central legislative body and operated with a bicameral structure consisting of an upper chamber for princes (Pshi) and a lower chamber for nobles (Worq). In 1767, following a peasant uprising, a temporary third chamber for commoners was established. Decisions were typically made through consensus, where individual representatives held a form of veto power that could block a resolution if they were not persuaded.

=== Local administration ===
At the local level, the system functioned through villages (Quaje) and manorial units. Each village was governed by a Quajeps (village owner) who held administrative, military, and legal authority over his land. These leaders were supported by administrative staff, including the Pshykheu (princely guards) and Beigol (administrative officials).

=== Social hierarchy ===
The stability of the government relied on a strict feudal hierarchy and a system of vassalage. The social strata included the Pshi (princes) at the top, followed by high-ranking nobles like first-degree nobles Tlekotlesh and second-degree nobles Dijinugho, and the lower noble warriors classes such as Beslan-Worq and Worq-Shautlighus. Loyalty was maintained through the Worqtin system, where princes provided weapons, horses, and land to their vassals.

=== Transition to Russian rule ===
The traditional independent government system ended in 1822. General Yermolov established the Kabardian Provisional Court, which dismantled indigenous institutions and integrated the region into the Russian military and administrative framework.

=== Judicial system ===
Judicial authority originally resided in the Khey, a court chaired by the Grand Prince. Over time, this evolved into specific formats such as the Tkharko-Khas, a jury-style court of selected nobles used for significant public cases. By 1807, the Sharia Movement led to the official establishment of Mehkeme (Sharia courts), which shifted the legal framework from traditional customary law (Adat) to Islamic principles. The totality of customs that served as law for every Circassian, and indeed for every highlander, in family and social life was called adat (in Circassian - Xabze). Almost every separate society had its own adat (customary law), which in general terms were very similar to one another. During the period of independence of the Caucasian tribes, the Kabardian adat was considered the most developed and was accepted by many Circassian societies. Circassian society, whether it possessed an upper class or not, had from time immemorial lived according to its own customs. Whether due to the unfamiliarity of the population with sharia, or because of the dishonesty and greed of judges and mullahs, Circassians often preferred adat courts to sharia courts. Despite their limited knowledge of Islamic law, they soon realized that the mullahs interpreted the written law of the Quran at their own discretion. For this reason, in important cases they resorted to the decrees of adat, which were more understandable to them. In minor cases the disputants sometimes turned to the mullahs for judgment only out of a desire to resolve their disputes more quickly. The equal validity of both adat and sharia courts allowed considerable room for arbitrariness, giving litigants the option of choosing either method of trial. When a plaintiff believed that he could win more easily under adat, he demanded that the case be judged according to the customs of his ancestors. If he considered sharia more advantageous, he insisted that the trial be conducted according to the "Book of God," as the Adyghe referred to the Quran.

=== National assemblies (public gatherings) ===
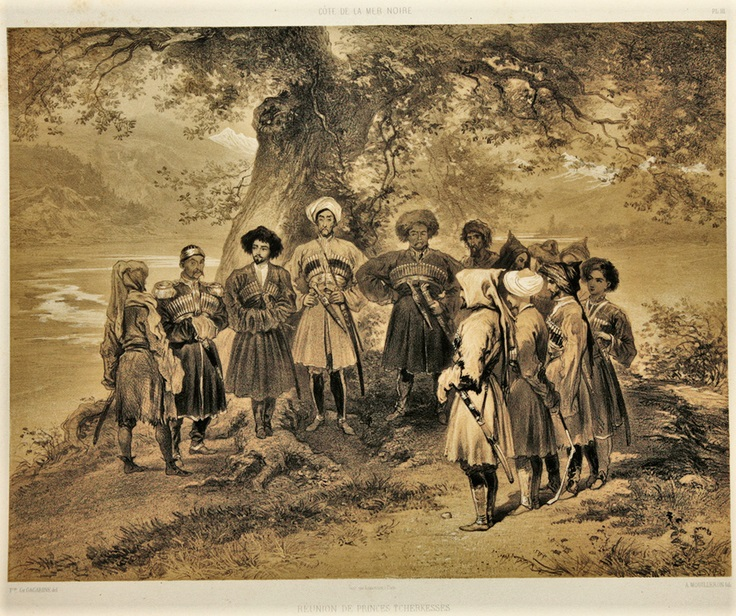
Gathering of Circasssian princes

Aside from Sharia laws in the later periods, Circassians did not possess written laws; their legal norms were preserved in ancient customs and traditions that regulated social and political life. On important occasions, the entire people gathered in public assemblies to discuss matters affecting the community. At these gatherings, the senior princes first presented their opinions or proposals, after which the issue was debated by the nobles and elders elected by the people. In these deliberations, the authority of the elders was often significant and could carry greater weight than that of the princes themselves. Decisions were not imposed unilaterally but were typically reached through collective agreement between the princes, nobles, and representatives of the people. If the elders supported the position of the prince, the matter was considered resolved and the decision was proclaimed publicly to the assembled community. Such assemblies were usually held in designated open areas located near the residences of the princes, where large numbers of participants could gather.

== Appanages ==
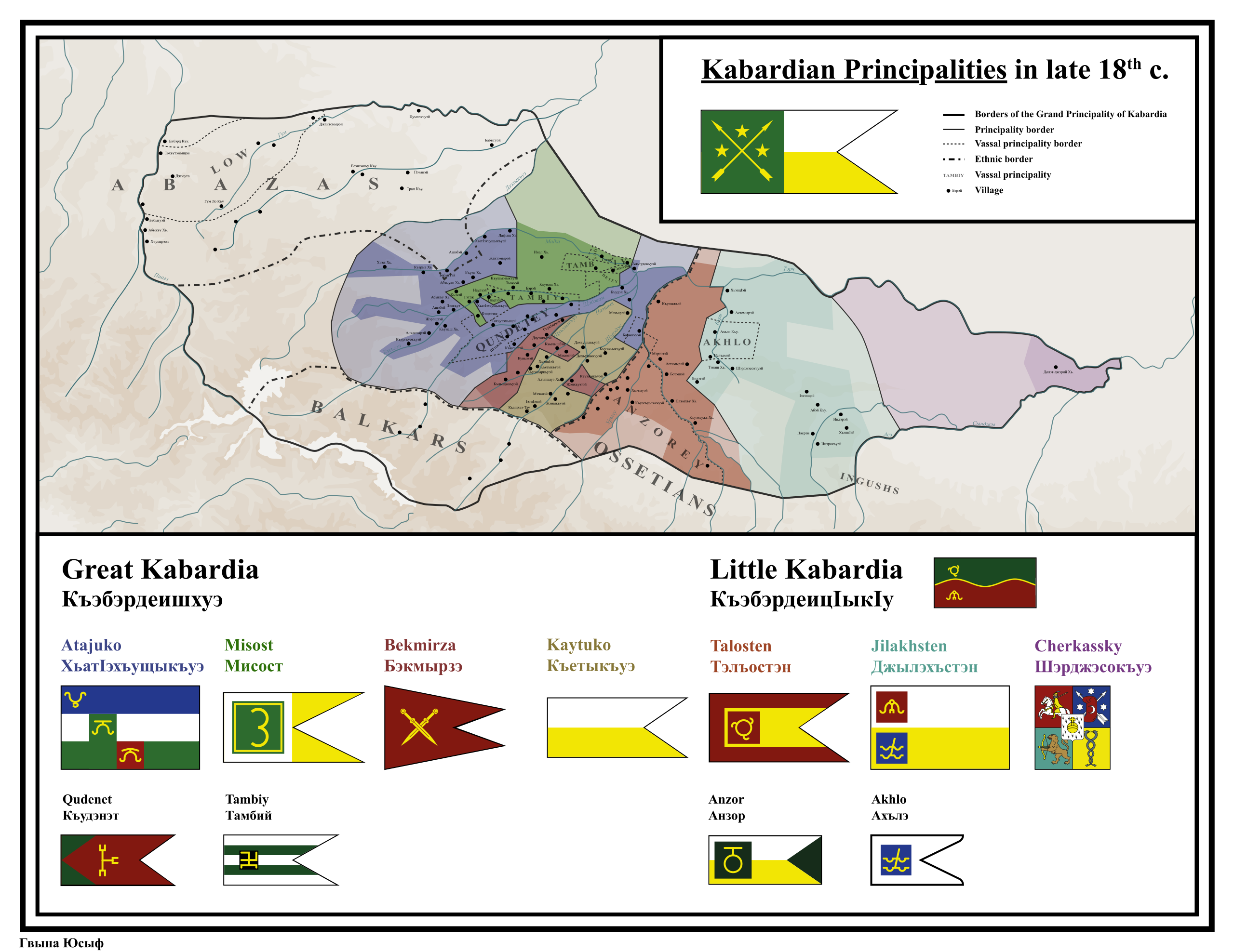
Borders and villages of the appanages of Kabardia in the 18th century

At the turn of the 17th and 18th centuries, Kabardia was divided into Greater Kabardia and Lesser Kabardia. Greater Kabardia comprised the three princely appanages of Jambotey, Hatokhshoqoey, and Misostey, while Lesser Kabardia consisted of Jilakhstaney and Talostaney.

The basic territorial unit of each appanage was the kuazhe (also called kabak in 18th-century sources), or village. According to information collected by the Russian Collegium of Foreign Affairs in 1748, the Kabardians "lived in large villages; the beks and uzdens built their houses from logs, while their subjects constructed wattle houses plastered with clay."

Most villages were named after their owner, who was known as the kuazhepsh ("prince of the village"), although in some cases the owner could also be a noble (wark or uorqi). This pattern is clearly reflected on the 1744 land map of Kabardia, where 116 of the 122 recorded villages bore the names or surnames of their owners.

Large villages were commonly divided into separate quarters known as hablas. These quarters belonged to subordinate vassals of the principal landowner. When a noble transferred his allegiance to another prince, he often relocated with his dependents and established a new habla within the settlement of his new patron.

The hablas differed in size, population, and social composition. They were inhabited by members of various social classes, including petty warks, azats, ogs, lagunapyts, unauts, and other dependent groups, and were administered by the head of each quarter. Although Kabardian villages possessed official names, they functioned as federations of several relatively autonomous hablas.

The kuazhepsh, whose name the village usually bore, exercised supreme authority within the settlement. His closest relatives served as his principal advisers in matters of administration and justice.

Each village maintained an arbitration court known as the heyzja, which heard local civil disputes. Its judges were elected annually from among respected warks and representatives of the local population and formally confirmed by the village head. Contemporary sources describe the proceedings of the heyzja as public, with decisions reached through open discussion before being announced orally.

In wartime, every kuazhepsh was obliged to join the campaign of his appanage prince together with his brothers, sons, nephews, vassals, and, when necessary, his dependent chagars. Each village commander led his own detachment in battle.

Groups of villages occupying the valley of a single river and its tributaries formed a territorial unit known as a psykho. Although the psykho had no independent administrative status, several such districts together constituted an appanage principality.

Information on the size of Kabardian villages is limited but surviving documents provide valuable evidence. A document dated 1752 records that "from the Kenzha River to the Shelukha River is about five versts, and along it there are three taverns, in which there are sometimes 60–70 and 90 households."

Another document from 1762 states that the Bechmirza princes had illegally seized "12 taverns... in which there were 20–30 and 60 households."

These records indicate that Kabardian villages generally contained between 30 and 60 households. Other contemporary sources further state that each household included "30, 40, and even 50 male and female souls."

Based on these figures, historians estimate that the average Kabardian village contained approximately 1,800–2,100 inhabitants.

According to the 1744 land map of Kabardia and its accompanying commentary of 1753, the Jambotey appanage contained 34 villages, of which 15 belonged to noble uzdens. The Hatokhshoqoey and Misostey appanages together comprised 44 villages, 34 of which were owned by noble families.

The same pattern existed in Lesser Kabardia. Together, the appanages of Jilakhstaney and Talostaney contained 44 villages, 32 of which belonged to noble uzdens.

Names of Princely Domains	Number of villages subject to princely vassals. Of these:		Number of villages directly dependent on princes	Total
Names of Princely Domains	Noble Uzdens	Non-noble Uzdens	Number of villages directly dependent on princes	Total
Jambotey	15	13	6	34
Hatokhshoqoey	14	1	1	16
Misostey	18	8	2	28
Lesser Kabardia	32	6	6	44
TOTAL:	79 (65%)	28 (23%)	15 (12%)	122 (100%)

An appanage was regarded as the collective possession of the entire princely family, which could consist of several related households.

Each princely household nevertheless functioned as an independent economic unit, possessing its own lands, vassals of different ranks, dependent peasants, and unauts. Contemporary documents leave little doubt regarding the economic independence of these princely branches. In 1747, for example, following the death of Prince Bemat Hatokhshoqo, all of his villages, residence, and other property passed directly to his children despite the continued authority of his elder brother, Qasey Hatokhshoqo. A contemporary report notes that "the court of the former owner Magomed... on the Kurkuzhin River, eight villages of Shidak on the same river were Magomed Atazhukin's, and now his children own them."

Numerous similar reports demonstrate the existence of private hereditary property among Kabardian princes. Individual princes also possessed the right to accept dependents of any social class under their personal protection, to buy and sell unauts and yasyrs, and even to leave their appanage. Nevertheless, the collective defense of the appanage remained the responsibility of the entire princely family, creating a political union of economically independent but closely related households.

The eldest prince of the ruling family normally served as head of the appanage. He exercised military, administrative, and political authority, assuming office automatically upon the death of the previous senior prince and holding the position for life. In carrying out his duties he was assisted by an administrative staff that included a treasurer, a butler, a clerk, and other officials.

The military and political organization of the appanages was described by S. Bronevsky, who wrote that the princes "govern Greater and Lesser Kabardia, each in his own appanage, as powerful owners, and in popular assemblies, as members of a federal society."

Referring to Kabardian oral tradition, Shora Nogmov wrote that the senior prince Qaziy Pshiapshoqo divided Greater Kabardia into three equal appanages of fifty villages each, while stipulating that "in general and important matters everything would be under the control of one senior prince."

Each appanage maintained two deliberative institutions: a small council and a great council. The small council consisted of the prince's closest relatives and leading nobles, who discussed routine matters and prepared proposals for issues of greater importance. Significant political decisions were referred to the great council for final consideration.

An example of the small council is preserved in a report by the envoy of the Astrakhan governor, Pyotr Gorin. He noted that Jambolet Qeytuqo convened his "small council" to discuss whether the Besleneys should be returned to the Crimean Khanate. The assembled nobles disagreed among themselves and postponed the decision until a general assembly could be convened.

A detailed description of a grand council survives in the report of Tokhtey Bicherin, dated 19 April 1745. While negotiating reconciliation between Kabardia and Russia, Aslanbech Qeytuqo summoned a grand council to discuss the Russian empress's consent to receive Kabardian ambassadors. Bicherin reported that two groups assembled in a circle: one led by Aslanbech Qeytuqo together with his eldest son Hamirza Qeytuqo and their retainers, and the other by the princes Betoq and Jembulat, their nephew Adjidjeriy, their brothers, and their respective followers.

The military strength of each appanage rested upon its noble cavalry militia, whose effectiveness was widely praised by contemporaries. When summoned by the senior prince of Kabardia, every appanage prince was required to lead the entire militia of his domain into the field and command it in battle.

No nobleman could reside within an appanage unless he was the vassal of one of its princes or of a noble who himself owed allegiance to a prince. Military service was regarded as the principal duty and highest honour of the Kabardian nobility. Warks accompanied their prince on campaign, while their estates were managed by their dependent peasants and unauts. Success in battle brought lasting prestige, as heroic deeds became the subject of songs composed by Kabardian bards.

Despite their military role, the warks were not merely princely retainers living from warfare. They were hereditary feudal landowners who, together with the princes, formed the ruling class (pshiorq) of Kabardian society.

The relationship between the Kabardian appanages and neighboring peoples formed an important aspect of their political organization. According to newly examined documentary evidence, dependent peoples were attached not to Kabardia as a whole but to individual princely families, which exercised authority over them through tribute, military obligations, and the institution of atalykism.

In 1747, another outbreak of feudal conflict divided Kabardia. Following their defeat, the Misost princes fled to Russian territory. The victorious princes united around the senior prince of Kabardia, Batoqo Bechmirza, and proceeded to divide the former possessions of the Misost family, both within Kabardia and among their dependent territories. Representatives of neighboring peoples, including Chechen, Digor, Balkar, Karachay, and Abaza elders, were summoned to participate in these proceedings.

Captain I. Barkovsky, who had arrived in Kabardia on a special mission from Astrakhan, reported the gathering and ordered his subordinate Yakovlev to determine its purpose. Yakovlev subsequently recorded that the assembled elders declared they had previously been subjects of Qasey Hatokhshoqo and his brothers, but that following the conflict they had been reassigned between Batoqo Bechmirza and Bemat Kurghoqo. They further swore not to shelter the displaced Misost princes or return any of their slaves or livestock should they appear among them.

These documents indicate that dependent peoples were divided among the various princely families and that, as the appanages themselves fragmented, so too did their spheres of influence. The evidence illustrates both the political authority exercised by the appanage princes and the comparatively limited power of the senior prince over the internal affairs of individual domains.

The appanage princes maintained direct economic and political relations with their dependent peoples, collected tribute through their officials, and occasionally led military expeditions in person. The institution of atalykism further strengthened these ties, as the children of Kabardian princes were frequently entrusted to noble families among neighboring peoples for their upbringing.

Although these dependent communities generally remained neutral during internal Kabardian conflicts, they were expected to provide military assistance whenever Kabardia faced external threats, particularly during wars with the Crimean Khanate. Contemporary sources also record occasions on which Kabardian forces defended their dependent populations against outside attacks.

When Captain Barkovsky protested the presence of young Kabardian princes and their armed retainers among the Abaza, Hamirza Qeytuqo replied that the princes were "not at all with Kazigirey Sultan, but are staying there to protect our subject Abazins."

According to E. D. Naloeva's analysis, the available evidence demonstrates that by the first half of the 18th century the traditional clan principle of settlement had been largely replaced by a territorial system founded upon feudal relations. Besides the princes and noble uzdens, the various ranks of warks also functioned as hereditary landowners, reflecting the advanced development of Kabardian feudal society. The consolidation of the appanages produced territorial principalities possessing defined borders, subject populations, courts, armies, and administrative institutions.

The prolonged rivalry among the appanage princes nevertheless reveals a continuing tendency toward the political unification of Kabardia under the authority of the senior prince (oliy pshi).

== Population ==
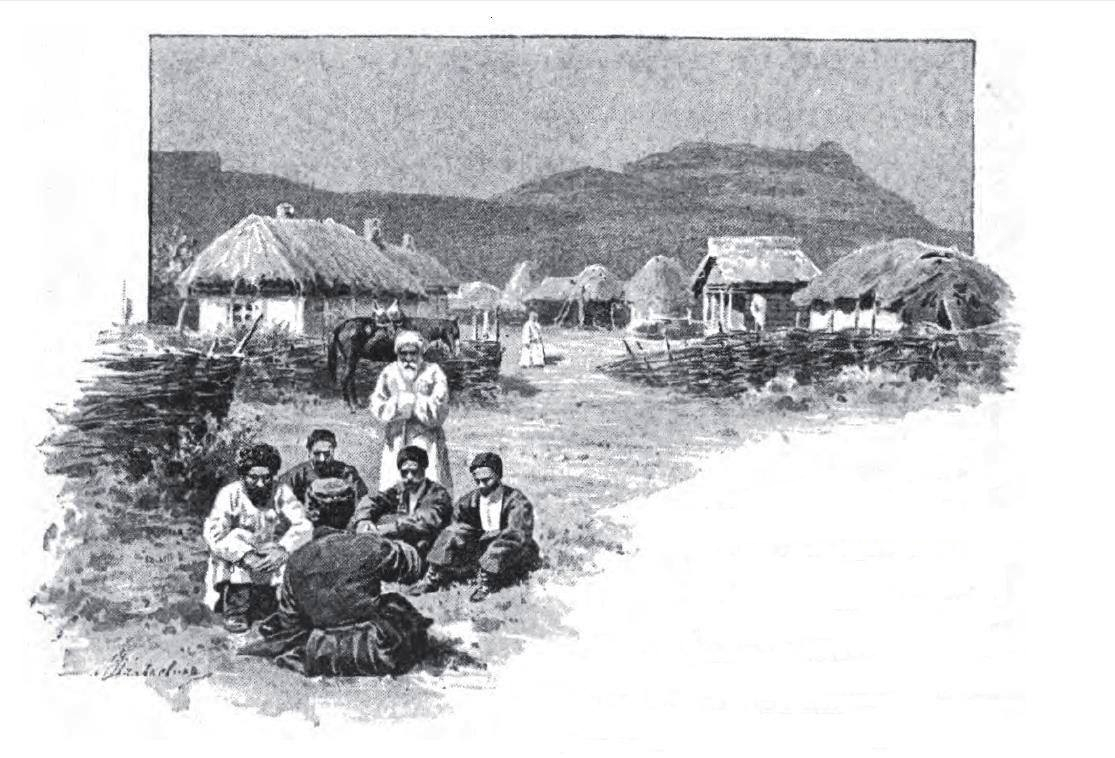
Illustration of a Kabardian hamlet by Mechislav Dalkevich

=== 17th-century estimates ===
Estimating the population of Kabardia during the late 16th and first half of the 17th century is difficult because of the absence of systematic censuses. Historians have therefore relied on indirect evidence, including the number of settlements, household estimates, and contemporary travel accounts.

According to K. Kagazezhev, the demographic situation of Kabardia remained relatively stable between the late 16th century and the mid-17th century despite repeated internal conflicts and invasions by the Crimean Tatars, Nogais, Kalmyks, rulers of Dagestan, and the Tsardom of Russia.

The Ottoman traveler Evliya Çelebi wrote that Qaziy's Kabardia contained approximately 400 villages during the 1640s. Kagazezhev argues that many of these settlements were small hamlets and proposes using larger settlements, known as kabaks, as the principal demographic unit. According to both Evliya Çelebi and A. Kh. Nagoyev, these larger settlements generally contained 300–400 households, with an estimated population of approximately 2,400–4,000 inhabitants each. For his calculations, Kagazezhev adopts an average of about 3,000 inhabitants per settlement.

Using surviving documentary evidence, Kagazezhev estimates that the Alejuqo domains contained approximately 50 large settlements, the Talostan domains about 40, Yidarey around 22, Jilakhstan at least 30, and the Anzor domains approximately 10. On this basis, he estimates a total of roughly 154 major settlements in Kabardia during the first half of the 17th century.

Multiplying this figure by his estimated average settlement population of 3,000, Kagazezhev arrives at an estimated population of approximately 462,000 inhabitants for Kabardia during the first half of the 17th century. He argues that such a population corresponded to the extensive territory then controlled by Kabardian rulers across parts of the central and northeastern Caucasus.

=== 18th-century estimates ===
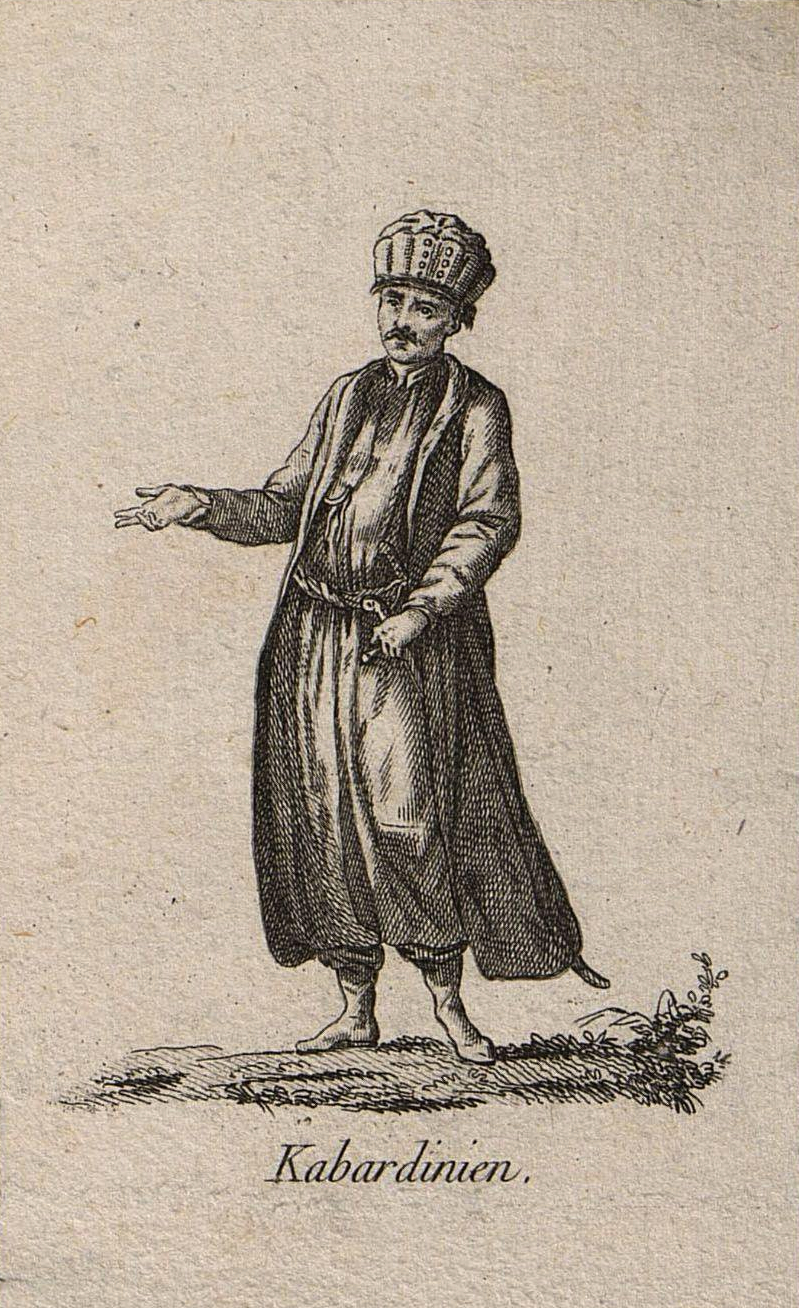
"Kabardian" by Christian Gottfried Geißler

Population estimates for 18th-century Kabardia vary considerably between contemporary observers and modern historians. Most estimates are derived from the number of recorded households and assumptions about average household size.

According to Xaverio Glavani, writing during the first quarter of the 18th century, Greater and Lesser Kabardia together contained approximately 3,800 dwellings. He also recorded about 600 dwellings in Talostan ("Tazsultan") and 400 in Jilakhstan ("Gilyakstan"), located along the foothills of the Caucasus Mountains.

Russian records from 1729 counted approximately 8,500 households in Greater Kabardia. Assuming that Lesser Kabardia contained roughly half as many households, historians have estimated a total exceeding 12,000 households for the country as a whole. Using an estimated household size of 10–12 people, V. K. Gardanov calculated a total population of approximately 130,000–160,000 during the mid-18th century, increasing to about 180,000–200,000 by the end of the century.

Szymon Broniewski reported similar household figures, estimating approximately 11,500 households in Greater Kabardia and 2,000 in Lesser Kabardia. However, he declined to estimate the total population because plague epidemics in the early 19th century had significantly reduced the population of Lesser Kabardia.

Julius Klaproth, who travelled through the North Caucasus in 1807, counted 2,690 households in the Talostan district and approximately 500 surviving households in Jilakhstan, noting that many settlements had already been devastated by plague.

The estimates of I. F. Blaramberg differ substantially from those of earlier observers. Writing in 1833 on the basis of official Russian military materials, he stated that in 1804 Greater Kabardia contained approximately 30,000 families and Lesser Kabardia about 15,000 families. Kozhev notes that these figures differ sharply from other contemporary estimates and therefore require caution.

Russian archival documents also provide information on household size. In 1747, Qasey Hatokhshoqo informed the Astrakhan governor that Kabardian households commonly contained between 30 and 50 people. Likewise, in 1784 Prince Fyodor Akhlov reported households containing between 20 and 40 inhabitants.

Kozhev argues that Gardanov's lower household estimates of 5–8 people are more representative of the period after the demographic crises of the early 19th century, including plague epidemics and Russian military campaigns. According to the author, household sizes in the 18th century were substantially larger than those recorded after 1825.

Additional estimates have been proposed by Kasbulat Dzamikhov. Referring to a Crimean demand for 1,700 yasyrs following the death of Bakhti Giray in Greater Kabardia in 1729, Dzamikhov concludes that Greater Kabardia contained approximately 8,500 households. Assuming Lesser Kabardia had half as many households, he estimates approximately 13,000 households throughout Kabardia.

Using Qasey Hatokhshoqo's statement that households often contained around 30 inhabitants, Dzamikhov calculates a total population of approximately 390,000 people.

Dzamikhov also cites documentary evidence from 1752 and 1762 describing villages containing between 20 and 90 households. Combining these figures with the 1744 map showing 122 settlements in Greater and Lesser Kabardia, he estimates that approximately 366,000 people lived in Kabardia during the mid-18th century. Overall, Dzamikhov concludes that the population of Kabardia during the 18th century likely fluctuated between approximately 350,000 and 450,000 inhabitants.

=== 19th-century estimates ===
Kabardia experienced a significant population decline between approximately 1810 and 1830. Historians have attributed this decline to a combination of plague epidemics, warfare, and Russian military expansion, although estimates of the scale of the demographic losses vary considerably between contemporary observers and modern researchers.

V. K. Gardanov wrote that the population of Kabardia during the first half of the 19th century was substantially smaller than it had been during the 18th century. He estimated the population at approximately 180,000 inhabitants at the end of the 18th century, declining to no fewer than 30,000 by the 1830s, implying a reduction of roughly five-sixths of the population.

Other estimates are considerably higher. According to figures cited by the Russian General Staff, the total population of the western Circassians ranged between approximately 300,000 and 501,900 people, including the Kabardians. K. F. Stal likewise placed the Kabardian population within the range of approximately 300,000 inhabitants. On this basis, the cited study concludes that many authors estimating the Circassian population during the first half of the 19th century proposed figures between 300,000 and 500,000 people.

Another estimate cited by the same source states that Kabardia contained approximately 45,000 households (around 300,000 inhabitants) at the beginning of the 19th century, but only about 35,000 inhabitants by the early 1830s. Using these figures, the author reconstructs a late 18th-century population of approximately 350,000 people.

== Religion ==
The religious history of Kabardia was shaped by the coexistence and gradual transformation of pagan, Christian, and Muslim traditions, each leaving a lasting influence on the spiritual and cultural life of the Kabardians. Christianity and Islam often became intertwined with older beliefs, acquiring elements of traditional rituals and practices. The coexistence of Christian and Muslim monuments with the continued performance of pre-Christian rituals remained a common feature in Kabardia and neighboring regions.

=== Circassian paganism ===
Although some Adyghe communities adopted Christian rites and traditions during the 14th and 15th centuries, Christianity existed alongside older pre-Christian beliefs. At the turn of the 14th and 15th centuries, Archbishop John de Galonifontibus observed that the Adyghe "only follow the Greeks in some rites and fasts," while maintaining "their own cults and rites."

The Kabardian pagan system of the late Middle Ages included a hierarchy of deities divided by researchers into three main categories: national, regional, and tribal (family) cults. Among the major Circassian deities were Tha, the creator and supreme deity; Uashkho, the god of the sky; Psetha, the deity associated with the soul; Thagaledj, the god of fertility; Tlepsh, the god of fire and patron of blacksmiths; Mazitha, the god of forests and protector of hunters; Zekotkha, the patron of horsemen; and Amysh, the protector of sheep. The element "tha" appears not only in the name of the supreme deity but also in the names of several other figures within the Circassian pantheon.

=== Christianity ===
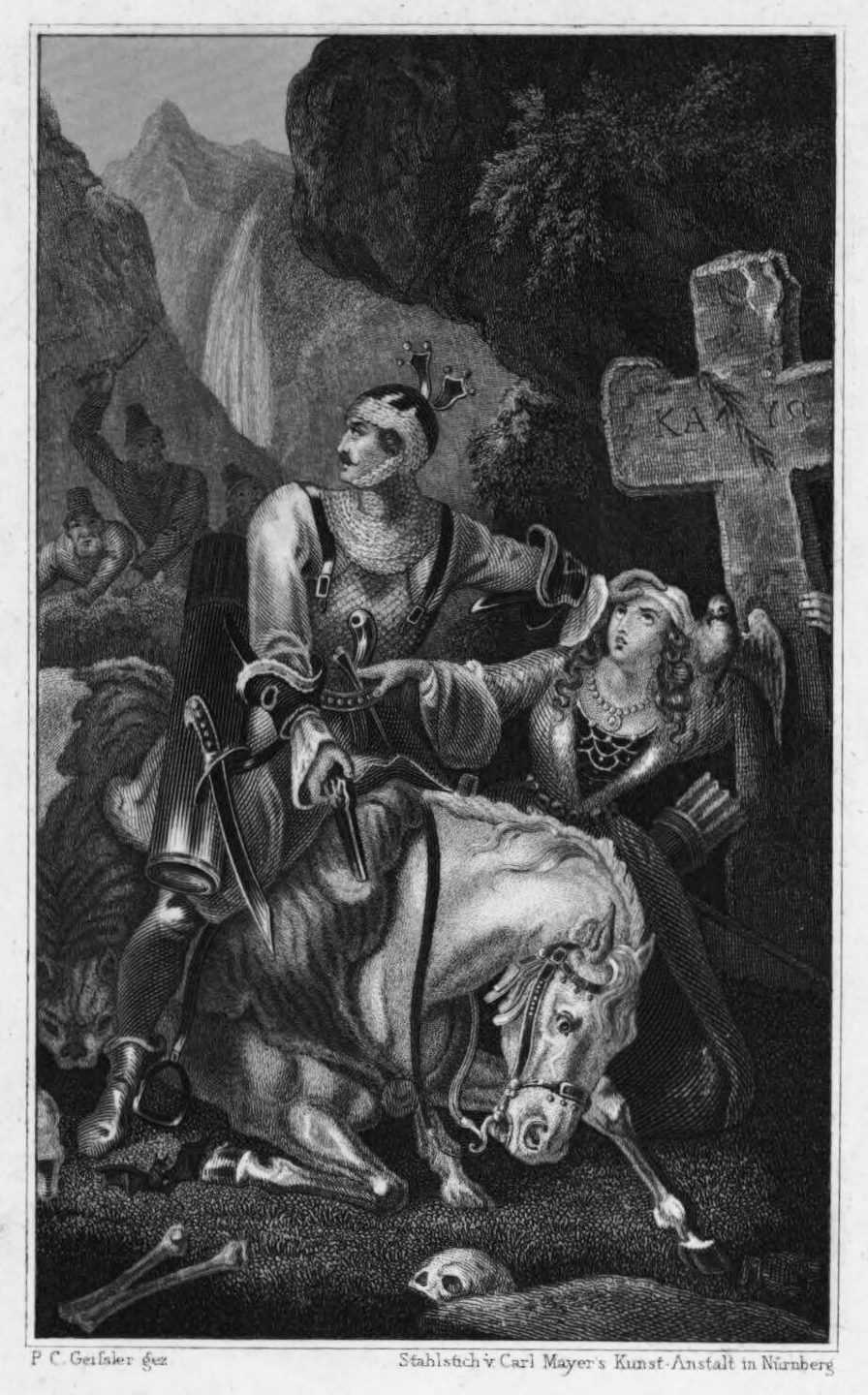
"Kabardian Prince protects personification of Christianity against Turkish Muslim proselytizers". Illustration from Eduard von Ambach’s 1845 novel

A new phase of Orthodox Christian influence in Circassia began when the Besleney, Zhane, Abazinia, and Kabardians dispatched diplomatic embassies to Moscow in 1552, 1557, and 1558.

Relations between Kabardia and the Tsardom of Russia were significantly strengthened in 1561 through the marriage of Tsar Ivan IV to Maria Temryukovna, daughter of the Kabardian Grand Prince Temruqo Yidar. The marriage became an important political alliance directed against the Crimean Khanate and marked the beginning of closer diplomatic and cultural ties between the two states.

Following the alliance, several prominent Kabardian princes accepted Orthodox Christianity while maintaining close political and familial relations with their Muslim and pagan relatives. Among them was Saltankul, the younger son of Temruqo Idar, who was baptized in Moscow under the name Mikhail in 1558. Tsar Ivan IV personally sponsored his baptism and ordered that he receive a formal education.

The historian Nikolay Karamzin observed that Christianity, introduced to the region during the Byzantine period, had never completely disappeared among the Circassians:

"The faith... implanted between the Black and Caspian Seas in the most ancient times of the Byzantine Empire has not yet completely died out in these lands; its dark traditions and some rituals remain... the princes baptized their children in Moscow, entrusting them to the Tsar for upbringing—some were baptized themselves."

The alliance also facilitated the rise of the Cherkassky princely family, descendants of Temruqo Idar, who became prominent members of the Russian nobility and played an important role in the military, diplomatic, and administrative affairs of the Russian state from the 16th century onward.

=== Islam ===
Islam began spreading among the Circassians after the Ottoman conquest of Kaffa and the Genoese colonies in the northern Black Sea during the late 15th century. According to historian P. P. Korolenko, the Crimean khans played the leading role in this process, with Devlet I Giray conducting campaigns into Kabardia during the second half of the 16th century to promote Islam by force and punish resisting communities through raids and plunder.

By the mid-16th century, some Kabardians had already adopted Islam, although the conversion of the wider population continued throughout the 16th, 17th, and 18th centuries. Seventeenth-century observers described Kabardia as religiously diverse. The Italian traveler G. Lucca reported that most Circassians were Muslims while others remained Orthodox Christians, whereas V. Ya. Streis remarked that although the Kabardians identified themselves as Muslims, many retained traditional pagan beliefs.

Evliya Çelebi wrote that during the reign of Crimean Khan Mehmed IV Giray, Kabardians embraced Islam in greater numbers and qadis and imams were established in Kabardia. Nevertheless, he considered Islam to be strongest among the princely and noble classes, while older religious traditions remained widespread among the general population.

The French traveler Aubert de La Motraye likewise described Circassia as religiously heterogeneous in the early 18th century:

"Those who live closer to the Muscovites adhere to the Greek religion; the neighbors of the Tatars and Persians are Mohammedans, and those who live in the middle of the country are pagans..."

Modern historians conclude that Christianity, Islam, and indigenous Circassian religious traditions coexisted for centuries, with adherence often reflecting political and diplomatic ties rather than exclusive religious affiliation. The absence of centralized religious institutions allowed syncretic beliefs to persist throughout much of Circassia.

According to Z. A. Tseyeva, Islamization accelerated during the 18th century as part of Ottoman and Crimean foreign policy. She argues that this process was accompanied by military campaigns, the suppression of Christian institutions, and the gradual replacement of earlier religious traditions in Kabardia.

== Minorities ==
=== Abazins ===
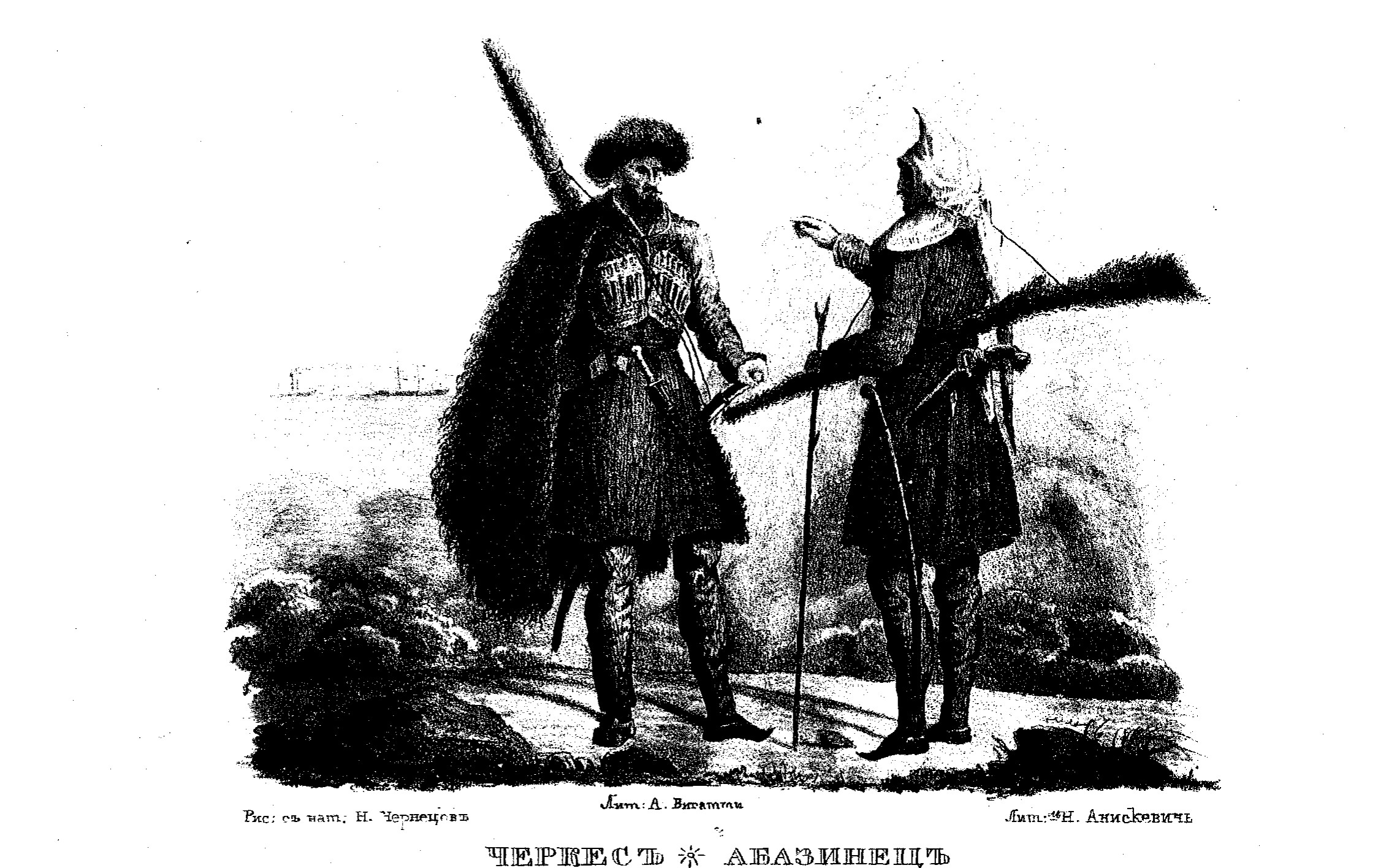
Circassian and Abazin from A Journey to the Shores of the Black Sea on the Corvette Iphigenia in 1836, authored by Stepan V. Safanov and published in 1837.

By the 15th century, when the state of Kabardia was formed, the ancestors of the Abaza people constituted a significant part of its foundational population and played an important role in the formation of the principality.

In 1708, during the Battle of Kanzhal, the Abkhaz-Abaza nobleman Minshak Asha distinguished himself as one of the notable participants in the Kabardian victory over the Crimean Khanate.

At the beginning of the 18th century, the Abazins lived alongside the Kabardians along the Malka, Baksan, and Kuma rivers. They were divided into six clans, Lou, Tram, Biberd, Dudaruka, Kyach, and Klysh, and were therefore collectively known in Tatar sources as the Altykesek Abaz ("Six-Clan Abazins"). According to data from 1753, they were territorially divided into four groups: the Upper, Middle, Lower (Tanbiyukay), and Ekeptsov Abazins. All of these groups fell within the sphere of influence of the three princely appanages of Greater Kabardia, although the sources do not specify which groups belonged to each appanage.

In 1721, during his retreat from Kabardia, Crimean Prince Saadat Giray devastated the lands of the Tapanta Abazins, who were vassals of the Kabardian princes. Between 10,000 and 12,000 people living on the left bank of the Baksan River were deported to the Kuban as punishment for their pro-Russian orientation and refusal to submit.

Just over a decade later, during the Russo-Turkish War (1735–1739), the Kabardians launched a campaign into the Kuban region of the Crimean Khanate. Kabardian princes Bemat Kurghoqo and Karamirza Aliy, together with Donduk-Ombo, defeated the ulus of Musa-Murza and the Abaza Circassians. In the spring of 1739, a larger Kabardian-Kalmyk campaign under Aslanbech the Red-Mustached advanced beyond the Laba River to the upper reaches of the Khevz River. According to Aslanbech's report to St. Petersburg, the expedition captured 5,000 Bezlaya and 2,000 Begbai villages, enabling many of the Abazins who had been deported to the Kuban in 1721 to return to Kabardia.

=== Balkars ===
The history of relations between Balkaria and Kabardia in the 16th–17th centuries is illuminated by a document discovered in the collections of the Russian State Military Historical Archive (RGVIA), which states that "the Chegems live in the rear of Greater Kabardia, in the upper reaches of the Chegem River, which bears the same name, and which is called Shaudan at its source, as well as along the Gondelen River, which flows into the Baksan. They have up to 1,000 households." Based on this evidence, some historians estimate the Chegem population at approximately 8,000–10,000 during the second half of the 18th century. The document further states that "the Chegems settled in these places in ancient times from Mazhar; they were once a strong people."

According to the same source, after the Circassians occupied the lands of the Khazar-Kabardians in the 15th century, they fought a prolonged war against the Chegems. "In that war, many Kabardian uzdens were defeated... and then Shamkhal Tarkovsky, the ruler of Dagestan, came to their aid with his army. The Chegems then lost their native rulers and, by the will of the Shamkhal, became subjects of Greater Kabardia under the Hatokhshoqo princes, who imposed obligations upon them at their discretion. The Chegems are considered fully united with Greater Kabardia and profess the Muslim faith."

=== Nogais ===
Many Nogais served among the uzdens (nobility) of the Kabardian princes, while numerous Nogai murzas also resided under the protection of Kabardian rulers.

The Kalmyk invasions of the 17th century caused major Nogai migrations. Evliya Çelebi records one such migration, stating that Arslanbek, a Nogai leader from the Lesser Nogai Horde, sought refuge in Kabardia with 15,000 Nogais. Having come into conflict with the pro-Russian murzas of the Nogai Horde, Muscovy, and the Kalmyks, he was forced to retreat to the Dzhendzhek (Indzhig) River in Kabardia, where he found asylum.

Another major Nogai migration occurred in 1730, when Prince Salikh Giray, a principal rival of Qaplan I Giray (1730–1736), fled Crimea to Kabardia under the protection of his atalyk Yislambech Misost. Around 2,000 Nogai families (approximately 35,000–40,000 people) reportedly accompanied him.

=== Vainakhs (Chechens and Ingush) ===
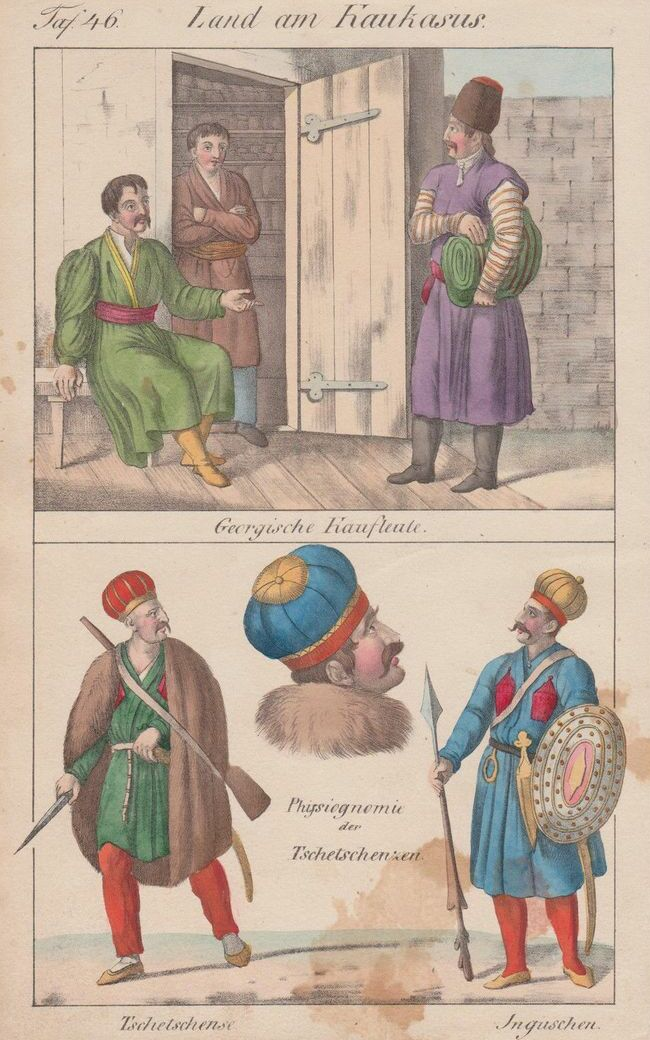
Circassian and Ingush man

From the mid-18th century onward, Chechens and Ingush gradually settled in the Sunzha–Terek interfluve. This movement was partly facilitated by the westward migration of the population of Lesser Kabardia toward Greater Kabardia due to conflicts with mountain communities, leaving lands along the left bank of the Sunzha sparsely populated. Kabardian princes regarded the newcomers as entering into Kabardian lordship. The Biltoy Chechens of the Terek region continued to call themselves Gebertoi ("Kabardians") into the 19th century, likely reflecting both the mixed composition of the earliest lowland Chechen settlements and the memory of this former political relationship.

One of the principal directions of Vainakh expansion was toward the Tara Valley and the basin of the Kambileevka River. These migrations were primarily motivated by the search for new arable land and seasonal pastures.

Over time, mixed settlements inhabited by Kabardians, Chechens, and Ingush developed. An Ingush folk song about "Prince Misost and Surkho" recounts the founding of an aul by the Kabardian prince Misost on the right bank of the Terek "on the land of the Ingush".

At the beginning of the 19th century, according to K. F. Stal, the village of Psydakha in Lesser Kabardia contained 664 Chechens (166 households), while the villages of Gaitiev and Eldzharukov contained 416 Ingush (164 households). Lesser Kabardia also exercised authority over the Chechen settlements of Kazhakova and Miziyurt.

Despite these migrations, the immigrant communities generally retained their distinct identity and continued to maintain ties with their ancestral homelands.

=== Ossetians ===
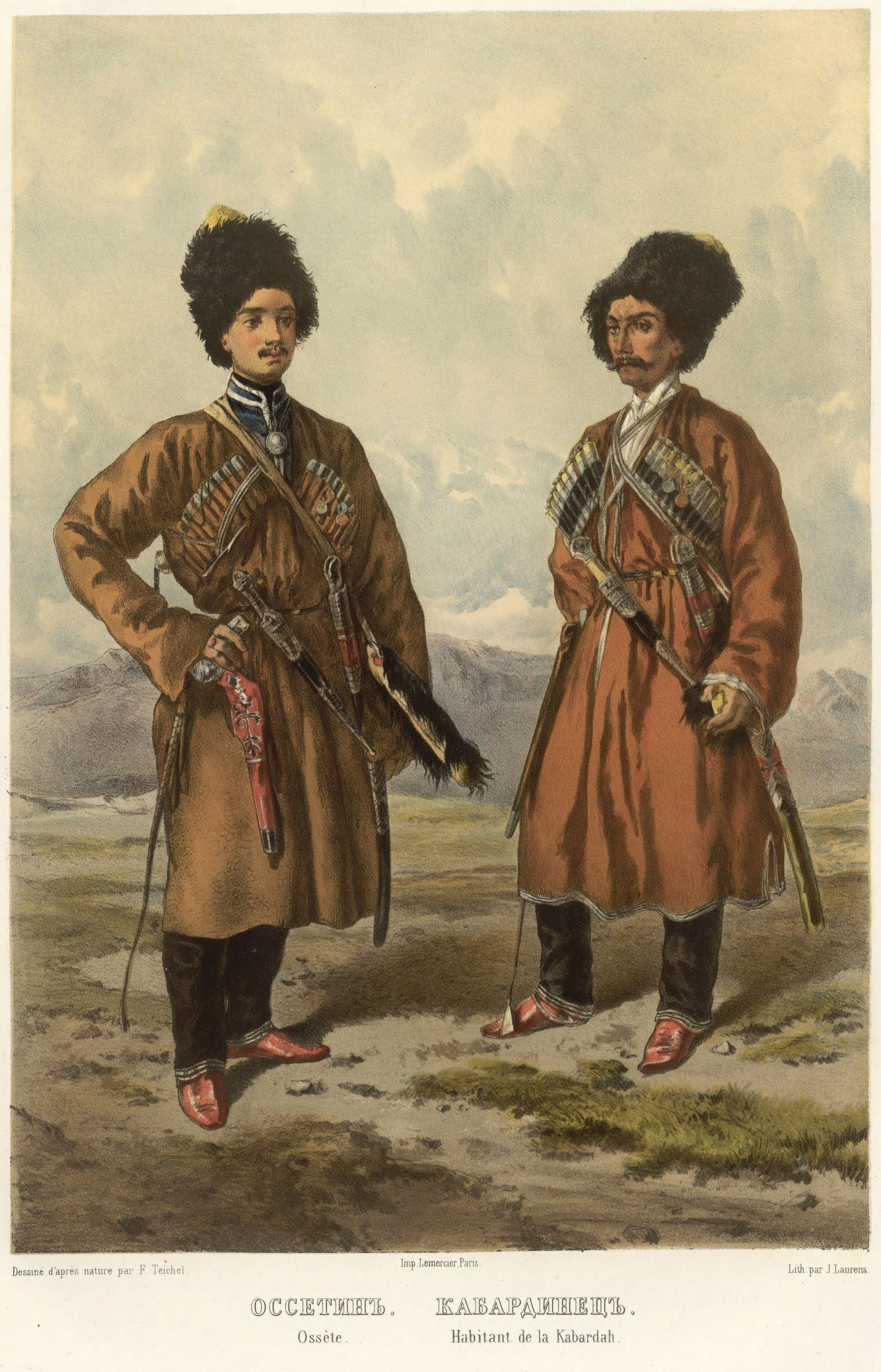
Lithograph of a Ossetian and Kabardian created by Frants Taikhel in 1862

A characteristic feature of Ossetian migration onto the plains was its predominantly aristocratic nature, as feudal lords bound by vassalage to Kabardian princes often relocated together with their dependent peasants. During the second half of the 18th century, a number of Ossetian-Digor settlements emerged on the plains adjoining the Digor Gorge. Besides the village of Karadzhaevo, Johann Anton Güldenstädt, who visited the region in the early 1780s, recorded the villages of Kubatievo, Fadau, Dur-Dur, Kabanovo, Vatshilo, and Tuma along the Urukh, Ursdon, Razbun, Lesken, and Dur-Dur rivers within Talostaney Kabardia.

At the same time, Alagir and Kurtatin Ossetians established five small settlements at the exits of the Ardon and Fiagdon gorges onto the plain, including the town of Kartsha and the village of Elder Tatta, with a combined population of about 1,700 people.

In the Terek Valley, in addition to the villages of Lars, Chmi, Baltash, and Dallag-kau, founded in the late 1720s by settlers from the Alagir Gorge, new settlements appeared no later than the 1760s, including the mixed Ossetian–Ingush village of Zaurovo and the Ossetian village of Irykau near the fortress of Vladikavkaz, founded in 1783.

According to calculations by B. P. Berozov, around 3,000 people (approximately 30–40% of all Digors) moved from Digoria to the Vladikavkaz plain, then part of Lesser Kabardia; around 1,700 people (less than 10% of the Alagir and Kurtatin population) migrated from those communities; and 215 households (about 20% of the Tagaur community) likewise resettled onto the plain.

=== Besleneys ===
In 1699, Crimean Tatars raided the Circassian region of Besleney. During the raid, at the residence of Prince Temirbolet Qanoqo, the Crimean prince Shahbaz Giray reportedly attempted to seize a young woman by force as additional tribute beyond those already selected. According to local tradition, the woman's brothers attacked Shahbaz Giray, who later died of his wounds, although another tradition attributes his death to a Besleney prince named Zaurbek, who suspected Shahbaz Giray of having an affair with his wife. Some accounts also suggest that the killing was orchestrated by Shahbaz Giray's own brothers.

The death of a member of the Giray dynasty provoked retaliation from the Crimean Khanate. In 1700 and again in 1701, Crimean forces under Kaplan Giray launched punitive expeditions into Circassia, ostensibly to avenge Shahbaz Giray but also to plunder and capture tribute and slaves. Those held responsible fled from Besleney to Kabardia, where they were granted asylum by the Kabardian prince Qeytuqo Jambulat.

Qeytuqo settled the Besleney refugees on his lands, leading to the establishment of the villages of Mahuqo and Dohchuqo. These settlements later passed to his descendants, including Hamirza Qeytuqo and his brothers. In the late 1740s, Crimean Khan Arslan Giray demanded the return of the Besleney refugees. Despite pressure from Empress Elizaveta Petrovna, Hamirza and his brothers joined their uncle Jambulat in refusing the demand, arguing that the Besleneys had suffered repeated persecution by the Crimean Khanate and had survived only through the long-standing protection and support of the Kabardian princes.

=== Svans ===
According to the supplement to the Facial Chronicle, in 1562, 500 streltsy led by Grigory Semenov and 500 Cossacks under five atamans, by order of the Tsar, joined the Kabardian prince Temruqo the Brave in a campaign against his enemies. The chief of these enemies is identified in the supplement to the Nikon Chronicle as the Kabardian prince Shepshuk (Pshiapshoqo Qeytuqo). Among the "Shepshuk uluses" (lands subject to Shepshuk), the chronicle mentions the city of Kovan, which may derive from the Nogai name Koban for the Kuban River. The significance of this account lies in its statement that Temruqo's Kabardians, together with the Tsar's forces, captured numerous "Son taverns," interpreted as Svan settlements.

Some researchers reject the interpretation that Pshiapshoqo controlled part of Transcaucasian Svaneti and that this territory was later taken from him by Temruqo. Instead, they argue that the "Son taverns" mentioned in the chronicle were Svan settlements located in Kabardia. According to this interpretation, the supplement to the Nikon Chronicle provides evidence for the existence of a significant Svan population in the North Caucasus during the 16th century. The mention of the city of Kovan further suggests that these Svan communities associated with the "Shepshuk uluses" were located in the upper Kuban River region in the mid-16th century.

Historical sources indicate that the Svans later settled in the Baksan Gorge between 1640 and 1743.

An analysis of the available evidence suggests that the Svans eventually abandoned the Baksan Gorge, apparently under pressure from Kabardia.

=== Cossacks ===
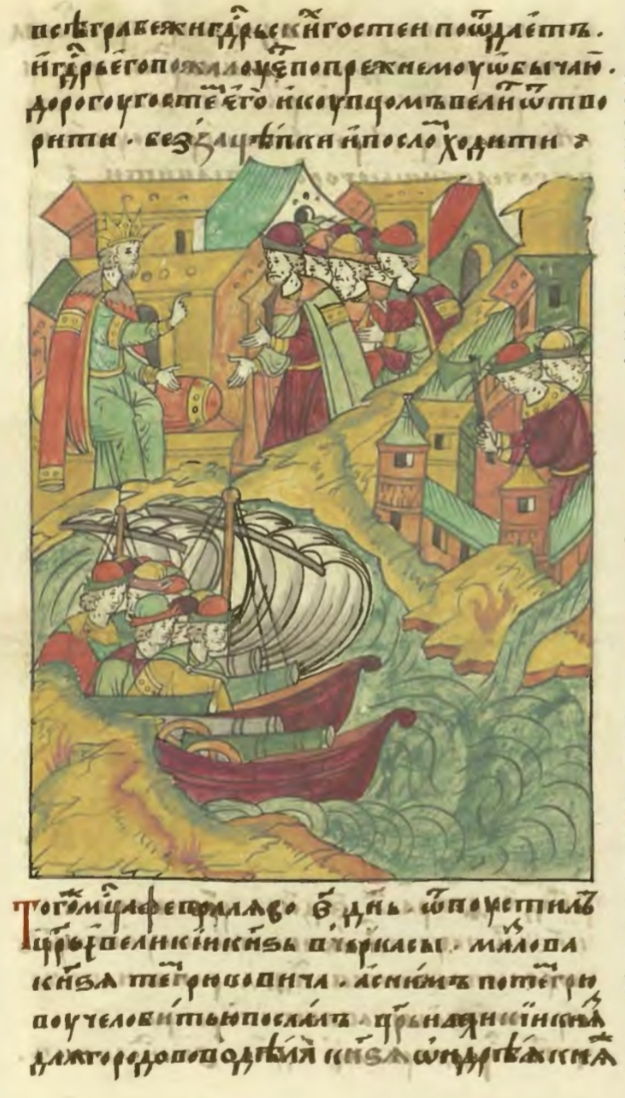
Ivan the Terrible sends Circassian princes to Kabardia together with resources to build Terki Fortress. The fortress later became a Greben Cossack settlement

The first contacts between Kabardia and the Greben Cossacks coincided with the establishment of Russian influence along the Terek River. In 1567, at the request of Temruqo the Brave, who sought protection against external enemies, the first Russian fortress with a permanent garrison was constructed at the confluence of the Sunzha and Terek rivers.

The construction of the fortress and the arrival of the Greben Cossacks reflected Russia's efforts to establish military outposts in the North Caucasus to secure its southeastern frontier and counter Ottoman influence in the region. According to Ch. E. Kardanov, the presence of Russian garrisons also contributed to preserving the territorial integrity of Kabardia.

According to Kardanov, the Kabardian population generally welcomed the establishment of Russian forts on their territory, viewing them as protection against raids by the Crimean Tatars.

By the second half of the 16th century, the Greben Cossacks on the Terek numbered around one thousand. Citing G. A. Kokiev, Kardanov notes that in 1623 the Tsar authorized salaries for 30 atamans and 470 Cossacks, from which Kokiev estimated the total Greben Cossack population at approximately 1,500 males.

Economic and cultural ties developed between the Kabardians and the Greben Cossacks through barter. The Cossacks obtained grain, horses, clothing, and household goods from the Caucasians, while supplying salt, fruits, vegetables, and the products of Russian craftsmen. According to Kardanov, this exchange fostered mutual cultural influence, and the Greben Cossack oral tradition came to incorporate themes and stylistic features from North Caucasian folklore.

According to V. Nemirovich-Danchenko, many Terek Cossack legends and folktales show evidence of borrowing from the epics of the indigenous peoples of the North Caucasus. Intermarriage also became common, as Cossacks frequently married women from neighboring mountain communities. I. D. Popko wrote that "The Greben woman was in many cases of local origin. She imparted to the Grebenets... the living traits of a southern aborigine."

D. Gilchenko likewise argued that the distinctive physical characteristics of the Greben Cossacks developed through centuries of intermarriage with neighboring peoples, including Kabardians and Kumyks. Speaking before the Anthropological Society at St. Petersburg University, he stated that the shortage of Russian women led many Cossacks to marry local women, producing what he described as a distinctive and physically robust Greben Cossack type.

In April 1688, approximately 1,000 Old Believer Cossacks began resettling along the Kuma River. Kabardian prince Misost granted them land on the Karamyk River in the Mozhary tract, near present-day Budyonnovsk.

== Economy ==
The Kabardian economy was a multifaceted system that transitioned from a self-sufficient traditional structure to one heavily impacted by regional trade and, eventually, the systemic destruction caused by the Russo-Circassian War.

=== Livestock breeding ===
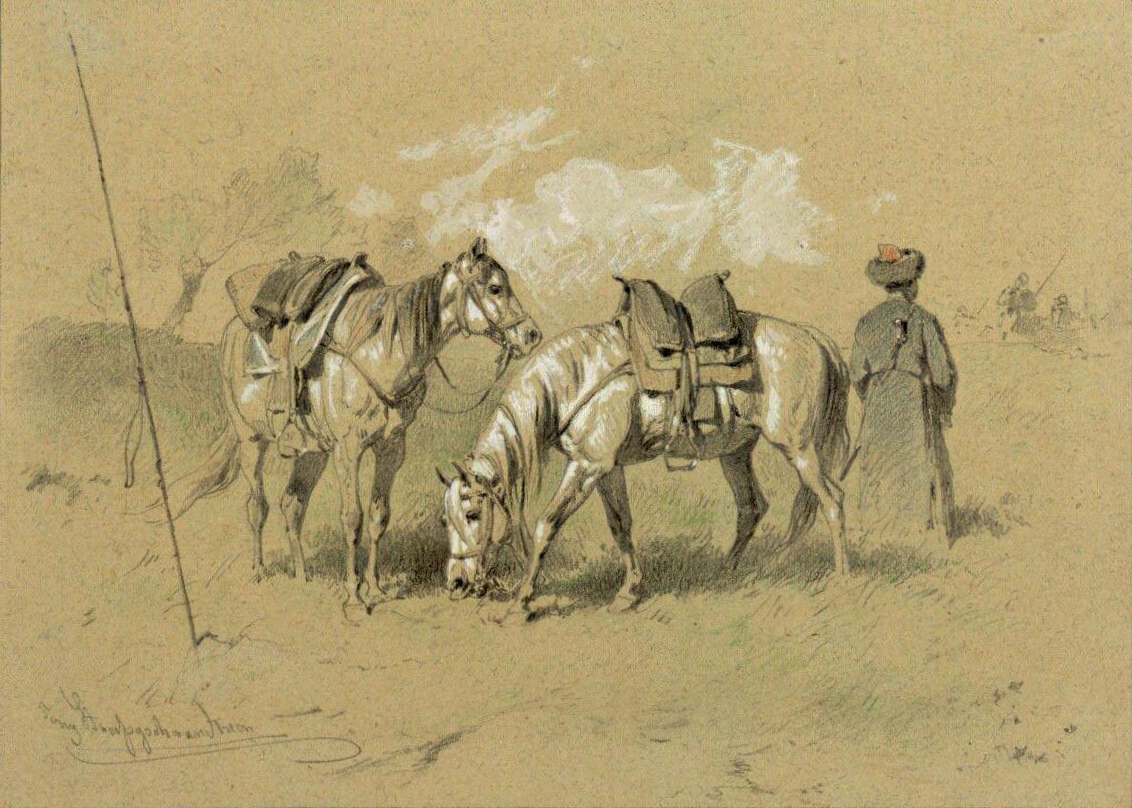
A drawing titled "Tscherkessenpferde" (Circassian horses) by Austrian artist Anton Strassgschwandtner, made in pencil, black chalk, heightened with white, and colored pencils.

Despite the long-standing importance of agriculture, animal husbandry occupied a leading position in the economy of Kabardia. According to historian E. D. Naloeva, livestock breeding increasingly influenced the development of agriculture, expanding activities directly or indirectly connected with pastoralism, including haymaking, hay transport, grain cultivation for fodder, and the production of straw for bedding. She also cites the construction of the Great Tataul, an irrigation canal in the Cherek basin used to water hay meadows, as evidence of the sector's importance.

Naloeva argues that the continued predominance of millet as the principal cereal crop was partly due to its importance for livestock breeding, since it provided both food for humans and grain and straw suitable for animal fodder.

Citing V. K. Gardanov, Naloeva further contends that the longevity of the traditional fallow farming system was likewise closely connected with the requirements of livestock breeding.

According to contemporary sources cited by Naloeva, livestock breeding occupied the foremost place in the economy of Kabardia, and the Kabardians themselves regarded livestock as their principal form of wealth.

Naloeva attributes this situation in part to the economic structure of Kabardia. During the period under discussion, land was not treated as a commodity, whereas livestock possessed significant market value and therefore offered greater economic incentives.

She further notes that the frequent conflicts among the feudal elite often resulted in defeated nobles losing their landed property, including arable land, pastures, and hay meadows.

Similarly, invasions by the Crimean khans and other enemies often forced the abandonment of crops, harvested grain, and food reserves, while livestock could be preserved by driving herds into the mountains. Naloeva argues that these circumstances made livestock not only a more profitable economic activity but also a relatively secure and portable form of property, contributing to its prominent place in Kabardian society.

The growing demand for imported goods, the absence of a domestic currency, and the relative ease of transporting livestock also led cattle to function as a medium of exchange in Kabardia.

E. D. further argues that while the absence of a developed grain market encouraged the subsistence character of agriculture, strong external demand for livestock and livestock products stimulated the expansion of pastoralism, particularly horse breeding and sheep farming.

She also identifies favorable climatic conditions, the extensive territory of Kabardia, and the availability of inexpensive serf labor as factors that enabled livestock breeding to develop on a large scale and contributed to its predominance within the economy.

According to E. D. Naloeva, the emergence of a military-feudal social order in Kabardia reinforced the importance of horse breeding. Cavalry service became a privilege of the ruling class, while horsemanship formed an essential part of noble life. She cites the Kabardian proverb "Шыре лӀыре зэхуэдэщ" ("A horse is worthy of a man, and a man of a horse"), noting that a noble (Uorqi) who retained his horse and servant could preserve his social standing even after losing his other possessions.

The military and social importance of horses encouraged continual improvement of Kabardian horse breeds. Naloeva notes that by the period under discussion, the Sholokh, Bechkan, Trama, Khuara, and Shaghdiy breeds had acquired particular renown.

Demand for horses increased substantially during the 18th century, when horses remained the fastest means of transportation, cavalry continued to dominate warfare, and horseback riding was a principal pursuit of the nobility. Citing Gardanov, Naloeva states that exceptional specimens of renowned Kabardian horse breeds sold for between 500 and several thousand piastres, at least twenty-five times the price of an average Crimean horse.

According to Naloeva, Kabardian horses were highly valued by khans, sultans, tsars, and empresses, who frequently accepted them as prestigious diplomatic gifts. She argues that Kabardian rulers likewise used such gifts to strengthen relations with neighboring great powers.

=== Agriculture and cultivation ===
Kabardia was one of the principal grain-producing regions of the North Caucasus. Millet was the traditional staple crop, while wheat and barley were also widely cultivated. From the 18th century onward, the cultivation of corn, sunflower, and tobacco expanded. In the plains, heavy ox-drawn plows were used for deep tilling, whereas mountainous areas employed terracing and irrigation systems to reduce soil erosion. Horticulture and beekeeping were also important sectors, and the region produced wine, honey, and beeswax for export.

According to ethnographer Baga Bgazhnokov, the agricultural economy of the Kabardians and other Circassians developed under the influence of the fertile plains, foothills, and mountain valleys of the North Caucasus.

The 19th-century observer Teofil Lapinski wrote that "the Adyghe's primary occupation is agriculture, which provides him and his family with a livelihood." Johann Blaramberg, however, regarded livestock breeding as "the most important element of their economy" and noted that a family's wealth was measured by the size of its herds. Historian V. K. Gardanov estimated that, in Western Circassia alone, the Circassians maintained more than six million sheep annually to meet export demand. Bgazhnokov argues that agriculture and pastoralism were closely interconnected and that the advanced organization of cattle and horse breeding, including transhumance, both supported and resulted from the high level of arable farming, particularly in Kabardia.

In late May or early June, the Kabardians traditionally moved most of their livestock to alpine pastures, where horses, sheep, and cattle grazed until September. The herds were then driven back to the plains, with many animals continuing northward into the Ciscaucasian steppes to seasonal grazing grounds known as Kurei and Sotei. During the coldest part of winter, livestock were kept in covered enclosures before being returned to pasture in the spring, beginning a new cycle of seasonal migration.

During the feudal period, the relocation of Kabardian villages under the fallow farming system required the approval of the hereditary landowner, who coordinated such decisions with neighboring nobles. Feudal lords also supervised agricultural production, including plowing, sowing, harvesting, and the seasonal movement of livestock between mountain and steppe pastures. Peasants commenced these activities only after receiving permission and a formal signal from their lord.

Under the direct supervision of the village owner, armed detachments were dispatched to the fields during the spring and autumn to oversee agricultural work and protect peasants from attacks by neighboring feudal lords.

These detachments also participated in hunting and, according to contemporary accounts, occasionally conducted raiding expeditions. A Russian description of the Kabardian people compiled in May 1748 states:

"Their owners in the spring and autumn, during sowing and harvesting of grain, go out into the fields and cover the work of their subjects; and each owner with his bridles has a special camp in hidden and strong places, from where they go to the Kuban and other mountain places for theft and for their plunder, and then they shoot deer and wild goats and hunt animals with dogs. And for all this they spend two months, more and less, in the fields."

Semyon Bronevsky similarly observed that Kabardian princes and nobles spent up to two months in armed camps while supervising agricultural work. Johann Blaramberg likewise wrote:

"During the harvest and haymaking, the princes and nobles, armed to the teeth, ride around their fields on horseback, both to supervise the work and to protect their peasants; for a month or two, they remain in the fields, taking every possible military precaution."

Bgazhnokov argues that the persistence of the fallow farming system depended on the abundance of available land. Between the 14th and 17th centuries, Kabardia occupied an extensive territory extending from the mouth of the Terek River in the east to the ruins of Madzhar in the north, the Malaya Laba River in the west, and the Caucasus Mountains in the south. He further estimates that the region covered more than 100,000 km^{2} and supported a population of between 500,000 and 700,000, with extensive arable land, forests, hayfields, and pastures forming the economic foundation of the country.

==== Destruction of the traditional agricultural system ====
According to Bgazhnokov, the loss of Kabardia's eastern territories in the lower Terek River basin during the 17th and 18th centuries, followed by territorial losses during the Russo–Circassian War, reduced the territory of Kabardia by more than tenfold and its population by approximately ten to fifteen times. He states that Johann Blaramberg estimated the population in 1804 at approximately 30,000 families in Greater Kabardia and 15,000 in Lesser Kabardia. Bgazhnokov further argues that Russian military expansion, the plague epidemic of 1810–1812, and the campaigns of 1822–1825 caused a severe demographic decline, after which Kabardia ceased to exist as one of the principal political entities of the Caucasus.

==== Cereals ====
Among cultivated crops, millet and barley occupied a central place from ancient times, with millet eventually becoming the dominant cereal. Bread and other millet-based foods formed an important part of the Circassian diet. Millet was also regarded as the preferred fodder for horses, which held a prominent place in Adyghe culture and were traditionally viewed as companions closely connected to humans.

=== Craftsmanship and industry ===
Professional craftsmanship existed alongside household production in Kabardia. Kabardian metalwork, particularly shashkas, qama daggers, and firearms, was regarded as being of high quality throughout the Caucasus. Silverwork and niello decoration were widely used to ornament belts and horse tack. Women played a central role in textile production, manufacturing felt, woolen fabrics, and burkas, which were important trade commodities.

The production of weapons and jewelry among the Kabardians is also attested in sources from the 17th century.

Following a temporary decline in Russian activity in the Caucasus, caused by a combination of internal and external factors, relations between the Russian Empire and the peoples of the North Caucasus intensified during the 1720s. This process culminated in the construction of the Holy Cross Fortress in 1724 and the establishment of Kizlyar as a major Russian outpost in 1735. The Collegium of Foreign Affairs in Saint Petersburg was responsible for relations with representatives of the Caucasian peoples, and its records contain information concerning the production and decoration of weapons. In the minutes of the interrogation concerning Greater and Lesser Kabardia held by the Collegium of Foreign Affairs on 7 March 1732, the Kabardian ambassador Bemat Hatokhshoqo, when asked whether there were factories in Kabardia producing firearms or other goods, replied:

"Both in Lesser and Greater Kabarda there are factories for making guns (weapons) and they make arquebuses and sabers for themselves, but they mostly buy from Russian merchants and from the Crimeans because Russian and Crimean guns are better."

Russian documentary evidence suggests that the number of Kabardian jewelers in the 18th century exceeded that of gunsmiths. Historians have argued that local firearms production did not develop on a large scale, partly because imported weapons were readily available. Russian documents from 1778 also record that merchants, including those from Georgia, brought saber blades and gun barrels from other regions for sale in Kabardia.

=== Foreign trade ===
The economy was outward-looking, operating primarily on a barter system. Exports included horses, livestock, wool, honey, and silver-decorated weapons. In return, Kabardians imported salt, silk, velvet, metal tools, coffee, and luxury goods. The main trading partners were the Ottoman Empire, the Crimean Khanate, and Russia, following a historical precedent of trade with Genoese colonies. Historically, the slave trade was also a component of this commercial network, with captives often sent to Ottoman and Egyptian markets.

By the 18th century, sources indicate that the Circassians maintained regular trade relations not only with neighboring peoples of the North Caucasus but also with the Ottoman Empire, the Crimean Khanate, Persia, and Russia. Two principal foreign trade routes have been identified for this period: the Black Sea route and the Volga–Caspian route.

The Black Sea route was oriented primarily toward the Ottoman Empire, the Crimean Khanate, and several Western European states permitted by the Sublime Porte to conduct commerce in Crimea and along the Black Sea coast of the Caucasus, including France, Great Britain, and later the Netherlands. The principal commercial centers of this trade were Kafa, Taman, and Bakhchisarai.

Elegant and practical garments produced in Kabardia and Circassia remained highly valued in Russia in subsequent centuries. As an example, a commander in a poem by Denis Davydov is described as wearing "...a burka on his shoulders, wearing a shaggy Kabardian hat." Kabardian hats were especially popular among the Cossacks, particularly those of Little Russia, with some being purchased from the Nogais and others produced locally. Circassian (Kabardian) clothing also became widely adopted by members of the Russian service class and officer corps.

=== Impact of war ===
The Russo-Circassian War caused a severe economic collapse. The construction of the Azov-Mozdok Line deprived Kabardians of their most fertile winter pastures. Russian "scorched earth" tactics led to the deliberate destruction of crops, villages, and livestock. Furthermore, military blockades and trade embargoes halted exports, while the influx of Russian factory goods led to the decline of traditional local crafts and weaponry production.

=== Slave trade ===
At the lowest level of the social hierarchy were domestic slaves known as unauts. According to historian sources, their legal status was not protected by adat (customary law). Slaves were regarded as the property of their owners, lived within their master's household, and could be sold, inherited, or transferred as payment for debts and obligations.

Some slaves from Kabardia were also sold outside the region, including to the Ottoman Empire.

== Slavery ==
=== Unauts and yasyrs ===
According to historian E. D. Naloeva, the lowest stratum of Kabardian society consisted of the unauts, a legally unfree class corresponding to domestic slaves. Eighteenth-century Russian sources distinguished between "natural unauts" and yasyrs, the latter referring to captives of both sexes who were kept as slaves.

Unauts primarily served as household attendants. Naloeva states that they occupied specialized positions within princely and noble households. These included cooks, kennel keepers, guides, attendants responsible for assisting guests with mounting and dismounting horses, household stewards, and table servants. Female unauts likewise served in the women's quarters, accompanying noblewomen and performing various domestic duties.

According to Naloeva, although these occupations generally did not involve physically demanding labor, they were regarded as degrading and were performed exclusively by unauts.

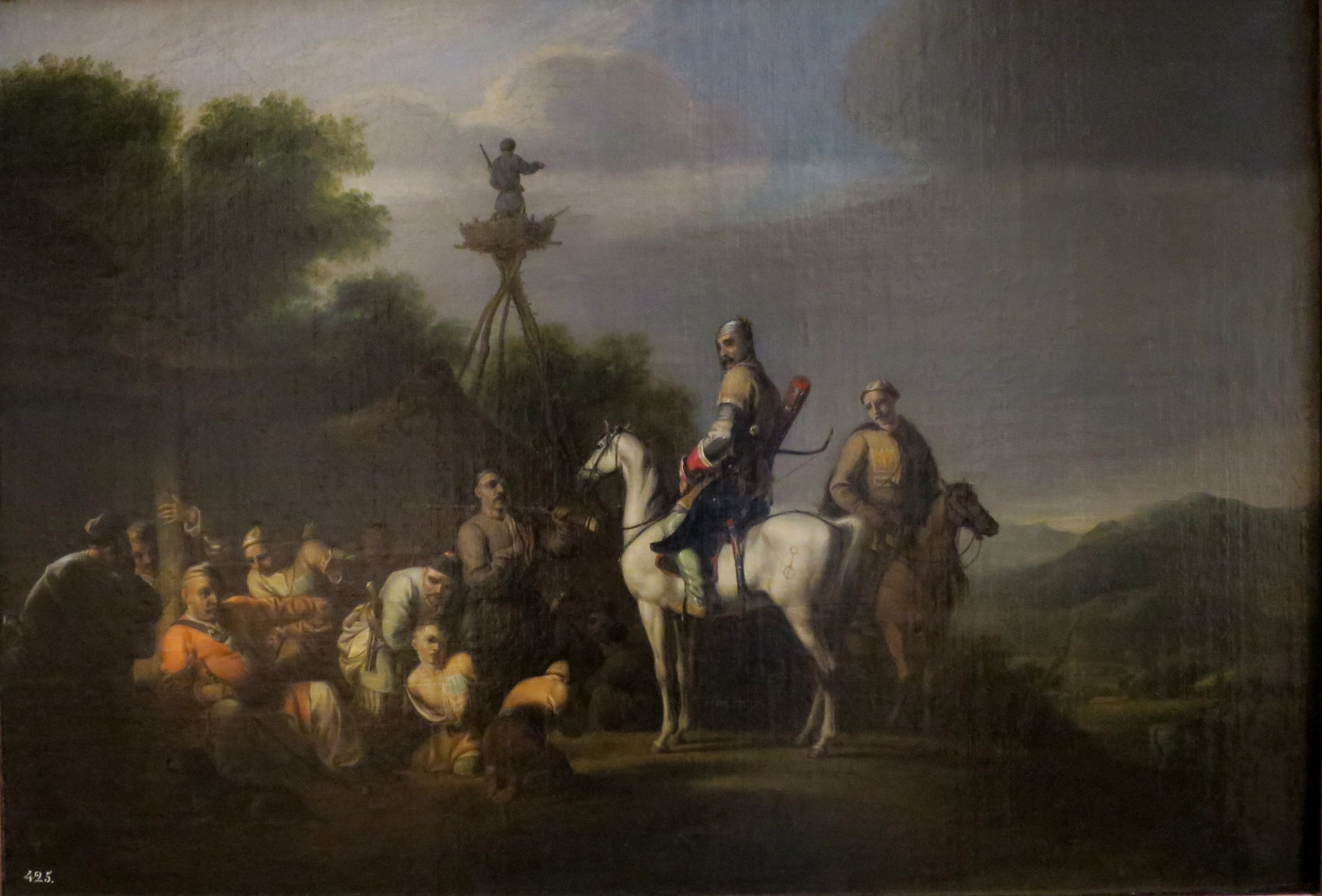
Sir William Allan , "A Circassian Prince Selling Two Boys" (1814)

In legal terms, yasyrs and unauts shared the same status. Both could be bought, sold, exchanged, or given away. Naloeva describes both groups as forming a distinct legally disenfranchised class whose labor and personal status depended entirely upon the will of their owners.

Semyon Bronevsky, comparing slavery in Kabardia with that of Khiva and the Kyrgyz, wrote:

"Slaves are treated with less cruelty than in Khiva and among the Kirghiz. As soon as a captive settles in, marries, and starts a home... he is accepted into the ranks of peasants on an equal footing with the old-timers."

Naloeva notes, however, that Bronevsky's observation applied only to male yasyrs. They were employed primarily in livestock breeding and, upon reaching adulthood, were commonly married to female serfs. Children born to female serfs inherited their mothers' status and became members of the dependent peasantry rather than slaves.

Female yasyrs and female unauts occupied a different legal position. According to Naloeva, they were generally not permitted to marry, and children born to them inherited slave status. Sources from the first half of the 18th century refer to such descendants as unaut-byn ("family of a slave woman").

Naloeva states that these legal distinctions between male and female slaves remained in force until the abolition of serfdom. She attributes the restrictions imposed on female slaves to the organization of elite households, where women of the ruling class generally did not engage in physical labor, making female unauts responsible for most domestic work.

Naloeva further argues that the legal principle by which children inherited the status of their mothers may reflect survivals of earlier matrilineal institutions. She notes that maternal status also influenced the legal position of the tuma, interpreting this as possible evidence for vestiges of matriarchy.

According to Naloeva, documentary evidence indicates that the principal sources of slaves in Kabardia were the purchase of slaves and the natural reproduction of female slaves, although enslavement through kidnapping and captivity also occurred.

=== Serfs (lagunapyts) ===
A significant part of the dependent population of Kabardia consisted of the lagunapyts, a group of serfs referred to in 18th-century Russian sources as "natural serfs", "plowmen", and "bachelors". According to Naloeva, these terms reflected both their local origins and their social and economic position.

The lagunapyts formed a distinct category of dependent peasants who lived in separate households within their owner's estate or in buildings near the manor house. Their labor was used in agriculture, livestock breeding, and other economic activities of the feudal household, including logging and supplying water to the manor.

Unlike unauts and yasyrs, lagunapyts were considered a "ritual" group, meaning that their legal position was regulated by customary law. A lagunapyt could have a family, a household, and personal movable property, including livestock.

According to Naloeva, the movable property of a lagunapyt consisted of three categories. When a lagunapyt married, the owner generally provided a cow or heifer to the newly married couple. The offspring of this animal became the inalienable property of the family and was known as nachikh-bylym.

The livestock brought as a wife's dowry, together with its offspring, also remained the protected property of the couple and was known as desherig. In the event of divorce, nachikh-bylym and desherig passed to the wife, while after the death of the spouses they were inherited by their children. If there were no children, the property reverted to the feudal lord.

A third category of livestock, known as didevos-bylym, was held jointly by the lagunapyt and the feudal lord. Upon acquiring a lagunapyt or when he reached adulthood, the feudal lord assigned him a certain number of large and small livestock for care and management. The lagunapyt could use these animals for food but could not sell or exchange them without the owner's permission.

If a lagunapyt successfully increased the number of animals within the didevos-bylym, the owner could divide the herd into three parts as a reward. One part became the lagunapyt's personal property as desherig, while the remaining two parts remained with the owner.

When a lagunapyt was sold, he lost his share of the didevos-bylym. The sale of a serf could serve as punishment for offenses such as disobedience, theft, or fighting, with the loss of this property serving as an additional penalty.

According to Naloeva, the sale of a serf was carried out with the knowledge of neighboring communities and an influential prince, while the serf was given a period in which they could seek another buyer. Semyon Bronevsky noted that landowners rarely sold their peasants directly, observing a degree of restraint due to custom.

The feudal lord was also responsible for certain obligations concerning his serfs, including paying the bride price for a poor serf who wished to marry and compensating victims for losses caused by a serf's actions, as well as securing the release of captured dependents.

=== Chagars (ogs) ===
The ogs (also known in historical sources as chagars) constituted another category of dependent peasants in Kabardia. Historians have offered different interpretations regarding their origin and numerical importance. The term "og" does not appear in 18th-century sources and is known mainly from 19th-century materials. Earlier documents frequently mention chagars, distinguishing them from princely and uzden serfs. These sources clearly identify the chagars as a dependent group, while also distinguishing them from slaves (kholops).

In 1747, Prince Qasey Hatokhshoqo wrote to General Deyvits in Kizlyar that "we divided the cattle, belongings, serfs, and chagars among ourselves", demonstrating that chagars were considered a separate category from slaves.

Shora Nogmov also distinguished the status of chagars from that of serfs, writing that if a chagar became impoverished and could no longer pay the required obligations to his master, he was required to serve in the master's household alongside serfs.

Some wealthy chagars themselves owned slaves. This is recorded in materials concerning the Peasant rebellion of 1767, when rebels demanded that "the Chagars, their own slaves, be left to their own devices, and that both the owners and the uzdens not interfere with them".

According to Nogmov, 19th-century chagars retained the right to own serfs, although they could not sell, give away, or exchange them without the permission of their master.

A major distinction between chagars and the serfs of the 18th century was their residence and obligations. Chagars generally lived in separate households, whereas household serfs lived directly with their owners. Many scholars of Kabardian social history, including Sultan Khan-Giray and V. K. Gardanov, recognized a similar distinction between chagars (or ogs) and lagunapyts. Khan-Giray referred to ogs as "external" dependents because they lived outside the master's estate, while lagunapyts were considered "internal" dependents.

Another difference was the form of rent. Chagars primarily paid obligations in kind, while lagunapyts were more closely associated with labor obligations. This distinction is reflected in the demands of the Chagar rebels of 1767, who requested that only a moderate tax be collected from them as had been done previously.

Historians generally agree that natural rent predominated among the ogs, while corvée labor was characteristic of the lagunapyts.

Regarding their legal status, N. Kh. Tkhamokov noted that an og who stole from his master's livestock could lose his status and become a slave.

T. Botsvadze, discussing penalties among ogs in the first half of the 19th century, noted that failure to pay dues or perform assigned labor could result in fines, including the confiscation of one or two pairs of oxen. Similar penalties existed among chagars in the 18th century.

T. Kh. Kumykov further noted that a disobedient og could be reduced to the status of a lagunapyt. Similarly, Nogmov recorded that if a chagar improved his position in his master's household and became capable of maintaining his own household, he could establish an independent residence.

Naloeva compares this process with the transfer of lagunapyts into the category of ogs, arguing that the two groups occupied closely related social positions.

According to Naloeva, the number of chagars in Kabardia was considerable. A 1747 letter from Prince Qasey to the Astrakhan governor stated that "the Chagars of the Misostovo (Misost) family... divided three households for each married owner, in which there are 30-40 and 50 male and female..."

Naloeva argues that these figures allow for an approximate estimation of the chagar population. In 1747, Greater Kabardia reportedly had 40 adult princes, with 28 married princes excluding the Misost family. Based on Qasey's description, the Misost chagars may have represented around 120 households containing approximately 4,800 people. Assuming similar numbers among the other princely appanages, she estimates that princely chagars alone may have numbered around 24,000 people.

Naloeva further argues that the number of chagars belonging to the uzden (noble) class may have exceeded those attached to princes, as the uorki formed the majority of the privileged classes. According to her interpretation of the 1744 map of Kabardia, 107 of the 122 settlements recorded on the map were associated with nobles and commoners, while only 15 were directly subordinate to princes. Taking into account differences in settlement size and incomplete documentation, she estimates that the chagar population associated with the uorki may have reached approximately 120,000 people, with a total chagar population of around 144,000.

Semyon Bronevsky likewise observed that "the majority of peasants belong to the uzdens".

Naloeva notes that social development allowed part of the chagar population to form a wealthier elite, sometimes referred to in sources as the "elders of the black people". This group gained influence in Kabardian political life and represented the interests of common people at assemblies convened for important decisions.

Some members of the wealthier chagar elite, aided by institutions such as atalyk and shauako, gradually moved closer to the nobility and entered intermediate social groups between the uorki and tlkhokotli, including the beygoli, beygolyshkho, and pshikeu. Others purchased their freedom and joined the class of azat peasants, although Naloeva notes that this process was still limited during the period under study.

In everyday life, chagars, like other peasant groups, preserved elements of patriarchal communal organization. According to Qasey Hatokhshoqo's accounts, they lived in large patriarchal households known as unezekhes, which likely practiced collective labor and distribution. Such households were headed by a senior male, known among Kabardians as a thamade (elder). The position was generally inherited through seniority rather than elected.

From the second half of the 18th century, the process by which peasants obtained semi-free status as azats through ransom became increasingly common. Naloeva attributes this development to two factors: landowners' concern that peasants might leave for the Russian North Caucasus Line, where favorable conditions were offered, and the growing need of feudal lords for money as market relations expanded under Russian influence.

This path to emancipation was mainly available to wealthier peasants, especially chagars (ogs), although it was also accessible to more prosperous lagunapyts. Naloeva argues that while many ogs/chagars transitioned into the azat category, they were not continuously replaced by new arrivals from the lagunapyt class, contributing to a decline in the og-chagar population by the mid-19th century.

=== Freedmen (azats) ===
Azat freedmen did not constitute a large social group during the period studied. Contemporary sources contain only occasional references to the release of dependents for religious reasons or exceptional services.

An azat was personally free and could not be bought, sold, or exchanged like a serf. They possessed their own households and were not formally bound by the same obligations as dependent peasants. However, because they held land belonging to a feudal lord, they remained subject to certain obligations.

An azat could not freely move to the domain of another feudal lord and was required to participate in military and other duties connected with the former owner. Naloeva therefore describes the position of the azats as combining personal freedom with continued elements of feudal dependence.

Although azats were personally free, their social position remained connected to the feudal structure of Kabardia. According to Naloeva, an azat could not be sold, purchased, or exchanged in the same manner as a serf. They possessed their own households and formally had no direct obligations of serfdom toward a feudal lord. However, because they cultivated land belonging to a feudal owner, they continued to have certain duties toward that owner.

An azat was not permitted to transfer to the domain of another feudal lord without authorization. In addition, they were required to participate in military campaigns and other communal obligations associated with their former owner. Naloeva therefore describes the status of azats as a transitional position, combining personal freedom with continued elements of feudal dependence.

== Military ==
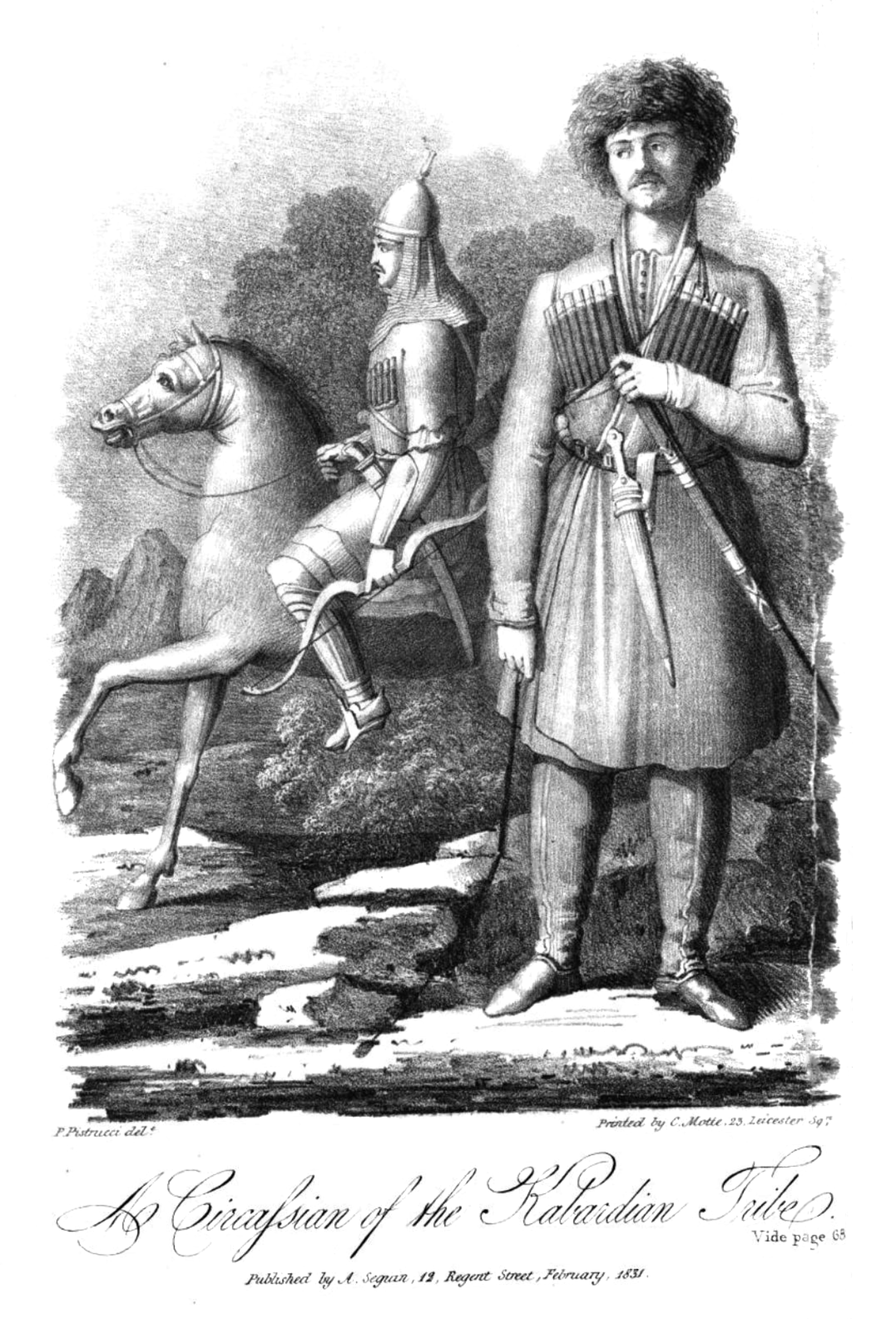
"A Circassian of the Kabardian Tribe", frontispiece illustration from T. B. Armstrong's book

According to military historian A. V. Ostakhov, Circassian warfare for centuries was characterized by highly mobile maneuver warfare, which influenced military organization, weaponry, strategy, operational art, and tactics. The Kabardian military system retained many characteristics of an irregular army, including the absence of a centralized recruitment system, limited command authority, and comparatively weak military discipline. Cavalry constituted the principal arm of the military, while the development of other branches remained limited. Ostakhov argues that this decentralized structure nevertheless contributed to the army's resilience by allowing the rapid mobilization of combat units and sustained resistance against numerous adversaries, including the Russian Empire.

The emphasis on maneuver warfare shaped the development of Kabardian weaponry, which prioritized lightness, simplicity, versatility, and ease of use. According to Ostakhov, Kabardian weapons evolved toward reduced weight and greater functional efficiency, with particular emphasis placed on bladed weapons such as sabers and daggers over firearms.

Ostakhov further argues that Kabardian military strategy generally emphasized attrition by gradually weakening opposing forces. Mobility formed the basis of tactical doctrine, with maneuver, surprise, and close combat serving as its principal elements. Offensive operations typically involved deep raids into enemy territory aimed at disrupting economic resources before withdrawing rapidly. According to this interpretation, such operations compelled opponents to divert resources toward defending their own territories rather than undertaking offensive campaigns against Kabardia. During these raids, Kabardian cavalry sought to evade pursuit, conduct surprise counterattacks, and break out of encirclement when necessary.

Defensive strategy likewise relied on maneuver, drawing opposing forces deep into Kabardian territory before engaging them in a series of mountain and forest actions intended to wear down the invaders. Ostakhov describes Kabardian battlefield tactics as including rapid penetration of enemy positions, attacks against flanks and rear areas, feigned retreats, fire maneuver, and close combat. He argues that the effective use of terrain and counterattacks compensated for comparatively limited firepower, making hand-to-hand combat the principal means of defeating enemy forces.

According to Ostakhov, these tactics proved effective for centuries in conflicts with groups including the Huns, Khazars, Mongols, Crimean Tatars, Nogais, and Kalmyks. He argues, however, that during the Caucasian War (1817–1864), the Circassians confronted a Russian army employing European linear tactics supported by superior artillery and firepower. In his assessment, Kabardian offensive and defensive methods proved ineffective against the Russian cordon system, while cavalry charges were increasingly repelled by artillery and close combat was countered by bayonet tactics.

Contemporary sources provide differing estimates of Kabardian military strength. One source states that in 1739 Greater Kabardia could field approximately 6,000 cavalry composed primarily of beks and uzdens, while Lesser Kabardia could mobilize around 3,000 cavalry. It further notes that dependent subjects were rarely employed in warfare and, when mobilized, generally served as infantry rather than cavalry. During the embassy of Bemat Hatokhshoqo to Saint Petersburg in 1732, Kabardian representatives reportedly claimed that Greater Kabardia alone could mobilize approximately 10,000 soldiers, including 5,000 cavalry.

According to historian Zaurbek Kozhev, the number of combat-capable men in Greater Kabardia had increased by the end of the 18th century. Citing the testimony of Pyotr Krechetnikov, governor of Astrakhan, he states that Greater Kabardia was capable of mobilizing approximately 15,000 fighting men. Kozhev further notes that the privileged estates of Greater Kabardia provided an armored force of roughly 2,000 men, representing about 13–15% of the population.

The military qualities of the Kabardians were also praised in a number of contemporary Russian accounts. Vasily Dolgorukov wrote:

"If 100 Uzden men ride out against the Daghestanis from our side, then not even 300 Daghestani men can stand against them; besides, even if we send 500 of our Cossacks, and 100 Uzden men, the Daghestanis will be more willing to fight 100 Uzden men than 500 Cossacks."

Artemy Volynsky, governor of Astrakhan, similarly wrote to Peter the Great:

"They are such warriors, the likes of which are not found in these countries, for where there are a thousand Tatars or Kumyks, here two hundred Circassians are enough."

Scholar and diplomat Dimitrie Cantemir likewise wrote:

"...these people (Circassians) are so brave that, according to the Tatars themselves, just as 10 Crimeans are stronger than 15 Budzhakans, so too are 5 Circassians stronger than 100 Crimeans."

== Fortifications ==
Fortification served two main functions: acting as an obstacle that delays the attacker in his advance to close combat, forcing him to remain under fire from defenders longer, and providing protection for the troops assigned to defend those obstacles from enemy attacks. This defensive component could be achieved in two ways: directly through structures strong enough to stop enemy projectiles, and indirectly through distance and range advantages, or more recently, camouflage. Overall, the widespread adoption of increasingly sophisticated firearms led to a heightened need for defensive structures, even as static obstacles became less decisive with the mechanization of assault forces.

Name	Name in Kabardian	Description	Source
Dzhulat	Джулат	One of the largest and oldest fortifications, a major settlement in the Golden Horde and later Kabardia.	
Kamennomostskoe	Къалэжь	An important fortress in the region.	
Rum-Kala (Burgustanskoe)	Рум-Къалэ	Considered one of the largest fortresses built in Kabardia.	
Khumaran	Хъумэрэн	A ruined medieval fortress situated atop Mount Kalezh above the Kuban Gorge in the Greater Caucasus.	
Kyzburunskoe	Къызбрун къалэ	One of the most important defensive lines in Kabardia.	
Chegemskoe	Шэджэм	An important fortress located near the Chegem River.	
Tokhtamysheyskoe	Тохъутэмыщ	Among the key defensive fortresses and settlements established during the Middle Ages.	
Argudan	Аргудан	A fortress known among Kabardians as "the dwelling place of great rulers."	
Cherekskoe	Шэрэдж	An important fortress near the Cherek River, built in the Kashkatau tract by Aslanbech Qeytuqo. During the Kabardian Civil War (1720–1736), it was garrisoned by 20,000 men.	
Old Chegem fortress	Шэгэмыжь Чыт	Located along the road between the villages of Lechinkay and Chegem Vtoroy (six kilometers from Lechinkay). Its ruins were discovered in 1949 on the high left bank of the Chegem River. The square fortress measures 50 by 50 meters and is surrounded by a two-meter-high earthen rampart. On the Chegem side, it features an entrance with an adjacent ledge; according to local tradition, it was erected during the Russian conquest of the Caucasus.	
Murtaze Trench	Мэртазэ и тIыгъэ	A stone-courtyard fortress situated atop a mound in the village of Murtaze.	
Upper Baksan fortress	Бэхъсан къалэ	A fortress featuring defensive towers and a central structure, situated atop a cliff southwest of the village of Upper Baksan, near the headwaters of the Baksan River.	
Khazhikala	Хьэжыкъалэ	A fortress mentioned by Evliya Çelebi (who called the fortress Shadkerman). According to him, this fortress was founded by Prince Misost and defended by a Kumyk army of 100 men under the command of Tukhtar Hadji Ali who was of Kumyk origin. According to Shora Nogmov, the fortress with a mosque was founded during the campaign of the Crimean-Ottoman army led by Alegot Pasha against Kabardia. Nogmov writes that the army that set out through Trans-Kuban to defeat the Kabardians included many mullahs, effendis and hadjis. while building mosques and fortresses in some places, they managed to convert many Circassian people to Islam and found a fortress and mosque in their land, calling it Hadji-Kale. The ruins of this fortress have survived to this day; This place is called Hadji-Taga, or "the valley of the Hadji." R. U. Tuganov's work cites information that the Hadji-Kale fortress was founded in 1761 by Temruqo, the eldest son of the senior prince of Kabardia, Bemat Kurghoqo. Temruqo Hatokhshoqo was a staunch pro-Turkish leader, visited Crimea and Turkey, and made the Hajj (pilgrimage) to Arabia, receiving the title of Hajji. A map compiled by E. D. Felitsyn shows the Turkish fortification of Hadji-Kale on the left bank of the upper Kuban.	
Borgustan fortress	Боргъыстэн	Another fortress mentioned bu Evliya Çelebi. He describes this fortress as "a terrifying fortress". Shora Nogmov, in his History of the Adyghe People, described Rim Mountain, noting its steep appearance, a staircase carved into the rock, ruins marked by piles of stones, and the discovery of silver crosses, spoons, and a large iron cross. He also recorded a local tradition that the site was once occupied by a city called Bergusant, whose name he interpreted as meaning "a gathering of many Antes." According to Nogmov, the Russians called the site Borgustan. In 1823, S. Bronevsky likewise described Borgustan, writing that west of the Kislovodsk fortress stood a remarkable rock formation accessible by ledges that appeared to have been deliberately constructed. He noted the presence of traces of ancient habitation, including graves, pits, and pottery, and recorded a local tradition claiming that the site had once been inhabited by the "Franks" (Europeans). Another Circassian tradition, recorded by Firkovich, presents a different account. It states that Rim Mountain belonged to the Kabardian princess Akbilek ("White-Handed"), who had migrated there from the upper reaches of the Zelenchuk River, "where her house and church with inscriptions still stand."	
Baksan walls	Бахъсэн блынхэр	More commonly known as the "Crimean walls." Built to resist the invasion of Bakhti Giray in 1729, where after a two-day battle at the walls, the Crimean forces were defeated and Bakhti Giray was killed.	

== Princely families ==
The crown attributed to Inal

All Kabardian princely houses traced their ancestry to the legendary ruler of Circassia, Inal the Great. According to Kabardian political tradition, all princes were regarded as descendants of a common ancestor and therefore as "brothers", collectively governing the country rather than recognizing a hereditary royal dynasty.

The cult of Inal occupied a central place in the ideological legitimacy of the Kabardian princely class. He was venerated as a saint, giving rise to the expression, "May God grant Inal's day!" His burial place was likewise regarded as sacred, and killing an animal in its vicinity was considered a serious offense. Sultan Khan-Giray described the traditional reverence accorded to the ancestor of the Circassian princes:

"Inal was revered by his contemporaries as a supernatural person, a partaker of holiness, and for a long time his descendants reverently called for help from the 'God of Happiness, Inal' in the firm belief that the happiness and holiness of the great ancestor could favor the undertakings of his descendants."

Inal (Инал)
Zan / Zhane (Зан / Жанэ); Founder of the Principality of Zhane	Beslan (Беслъэн)	Tabuldu (Тэбылду)	Chemrug / Temrug (КIэмрыгу / Темырыгу)
Qanoqo (Къанокъуэ); Founder of the Principality of Besleney	Yinarmas (Инэрмэс)	Jankhot (Жанхъуэт)	Minbolet (Минболэт)	Qirqilish (Къыркълыш)	Boletuqo (Болэтыкъо); Founder of the Principality of Chemguy	Hatuqo (Хьатыкъо); Founder of the Principality of Hatuqay
Yidar (Идар); Founder of House of Yidar	Beslan (Беслъэн)	Talostan (Талъостэн); Founder of House of Talostan	Jilakhstan (Жылахъстэн); Founder of House of Jilakhstan	Tokhtamysh (Тохъутэмыщ); Founder of House of Tokhtamish

=== Greater Kabardia ===
Jambot — Жамбот

- Qeytuqo — Къетыкъуэ
- Bechmirza — Бэчмырзэ

Misost — Мысост

Hatokhshoqo — ХьэтIохъущокъуэ

Shojenuqo — Щоджэныкъуэ

Tokhtamish — Тохъутэмыщ

Yidar / Aydar — Идар / Айдар

- Cherkassky
  - Bekovich-Cherkassky

=== Lesser Kabardia ===
Talostan — Талъостэн

- Sholokh — Щолэхъу

Jilakhstan — Жылахъстэн

- Mudar — Мудар
- Alkho / Akhle — Алхъо / Ахлъэ

== Flags ==
Flag of Kabardia (1805)

Flag of Kabardia (standard of Jankhot Kushuk)

Flag of House of Hatokhshoqo

Flag of House of Misost

Flag of House of Qeytuqo

Flag of House of Bechmirza

Flag of House of Jilakhstan (1641)

Flag of House of Talostan

Flag of House of Akhle

Flag of House of Mudar
