= List of rural localities in Kabardino-Balkaria =

Map of Russia with Kabardino-Balkaria highlighted

This is a list of rural localities in Kabardino-Balkaria. The Kabardino-Balkarian Republic (Russian: Кабарди́но-Балка́рская Респу́блика, Kabardino-Balkarskaya Respublika; Kabardian: Къэбэрдей-Балъкъэр Республикэ, Ķêbêrdej-Baĺķêr Respublikê; Karachay-Balkar: Къабарты-Малкъар Республика, Qabartı-Malqar Respublika) or Kabardino-Balkaria (Russian: Кабарди́но-Балка́рия, Kabardino-Balkariya), is a federal subject of Russia (a republic) located in the North Caucasus. As of the 2010 Census, its population was 859,939 on 12,500 square km. Its capital is Nalchik.

== Baksan ==
Rural localities in Baksan urban okrug:

- Dygulybgey

== Baksansky District ==
Rural localities in Baksansky District:

- Kremenchug-Konstantinovskoye

== Chegemsky District ==
Rural localities in Chegemsky District:

- Nartan

== Chereksky District ==
Rural localities in Chereksky District:

- Kashkhatau

== Leskensky District ==
Rural localities in Leskensky District:

- Anzorey

== Prokhladnensky District ==
Rural localities in Prokhladnensky District:

- Yekaterinogradskaya

== Zolsky District ==
Rural localities in Zolsky District:

- Etoko
- Zalukokoazhe

== See also ==
- Lists of rural localities in Russia
