= Yerokko =

Selo in Kabardino-Balkaria, Russia

Yerokko Ерокко (Russian) Ерокъуэ (Kabardian)
- Selo
- Location in Kabardino-Balkaria Yerokko (Russia)
- Coordinates: 43.320882°N 43.879038°E
- Country: Russia
- Federal subject: Kabardino-Balkaria
- District: Leskensky
- Founded: 1925
- Elevation: 555 m (1,821 ft)

Population (2021)
  - Total: 923
- Time zone: UTC+3

Yerokko (Russian: Ерокко; Kabardian: Ерокъуэ, romanized: Yeroqwe), alternatively romanized as Erokko is a rural locality (a selo) in Leskensky District of the Kabardino-Balkar Republic in Russia. It serves as the administrative center of the Yerokko rural settlement, of which it is the only inhabited locality.

== Geography ==
Yerokko is located in the southern part of Leskensky District in the valley of the Lesken River, approximately 6 km south of the district center, Anzorey, 30 km from Nartkala, and about 40 km southeast of the regional capital, Nalchik. The southern boundary of the settlement borders the village of Lesken in the Republic of North Ossetia–Alania.

The rural locality lies in a foothill zone; its average elevation is about 555 meters above sea level. To the west and east, ridges with mixed forests rise above 1 000 meters. The area's hydrography is dominated by the Lesken River and the Kudakhurt stream, with several springs in the surrounding terrain.

Yerokko has a humid continental climate with warm summers and cool winters. Average July temperatures reach approximately +21 °C, while January averages are about −3 °C. Annual precipitation is around 770 mm.

== History ==
Yerokko was established in 1925 by settlers from the nearby village of Vtoroy Lesken on former mountain pastures. By 1930, a collective farm had been formed and key infrastructure including a primary school and medical station had been built. A local village council was founded that year; until then the settlement had been administratively subordinate to Vtoroy Lesken. In 1951 Yerokko was again subordinated to the Vtoroy Lesken council.

During World War II Yerokko was temporarily occupied by German forces, causing significant damage to the local economy. Fifty-three residents who went to the front were killed in action. After the German retreat in early 1943, reconstruction began. A memorial was later erected to honor those who died.

In 1972, Yerokko became an independent village council. This was reorganized in 1992 into the Yerokko rural settlement. In 2003 the settlement was incorporated into the newly formed Leskensky District, separated from part of the Urvansky District.

== Population ==
According to the 2010 Russian census, Yerokko had a population of 812. The majority were Kabardian Circassians, with Turkish, Russian, Ossetian, and other minorities. By the 2021 census, the population had grown to approximately 923.

== Infrastructure ==
=== Education ===
Yerokko is served by Secondary School No. 1 and Kindergarten No. 4 “Ostrovok.”

=== Healthcare ===
The settlement has a local health clinic.

=== Culture ===
A community cultural center operates in the village, and local organizations include veteran councils and social associations.

=== Religion ===
There is one active mosque in Yerokko.

== Economy ==
Agriculture dominates the local economy, primarily through private land use. Mountain pastures and hayfields cover much of the settlement's territory. The main enterprise in the area is JSC “Yeroksky.”
