= Administrative divisions of Kabardino-Balkaria =

Administrative divisions of Russian federal subject

Kabardino-Balkarian Republic Russia
- Administrative centre: Nalchik

Administrative structure (as of 2013)
- Districts: 10
- Cities/towns: 8
- Urban-type settlements: 0
- Selsovets: 0

Municipal structure (as of 2002)
- Rural settlements: 168 (inhabited)

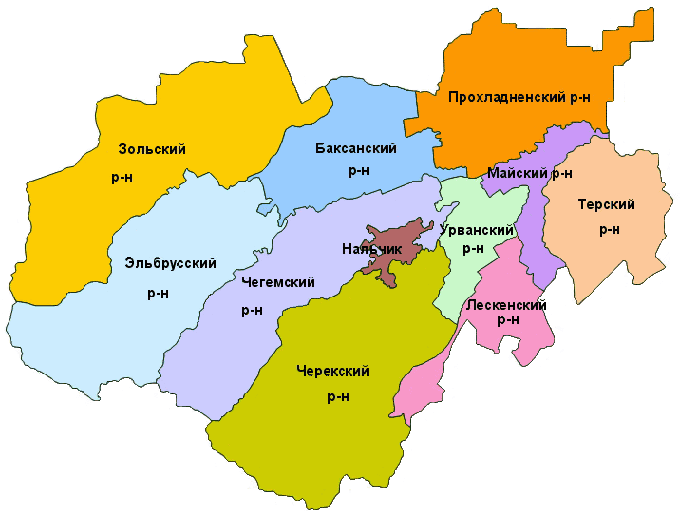
Map of Kabardino-Balkaria

Kabardino-Balkaria is a federal subject of Russia.

== Administrative and municipal divisions ==
- Cities and towns under republic's jurisdiction
  - Nalchik (Нальчик) (capital)
  - Baksan (Баксан)
  - Prokhladny (Прохладный)
- Districts:
  - Baksansky (Баксанский)
  - Chegemsky (Чегемский)
    - Towns under the district's jurisdiction:
      - Chegem (Чегем)
  - Chereksky (Черекский)
  - Elbrussky (Эльбрусский)
    - Towns under the district's jurisdiction:
      - Tyrnyauz (Тырныауз)
  - Leskensky (Лескенский)
  - Maysky (Майский)
    - Towns under the district's jurisdiction:
      - Maysky (Майский)
  - Prokhladnensky (Прохладненский)
  - Tersky (Терский)
    - Towns under the district's jurisdiction:
      - Terek (Терек)
  - Urvansky (Урванский)
    - Towns under the district's jurisdiction:
      - Nartkala (Нарткала)
  - Zolsky (Зольский)
