= Caucasus Governorate =

1802–1822 unit of Russia

Coordinates: 44°09′N 43°28′E

Caucasus Governorate Кавказская губерния
- Governorate of the Russian Empire
- 1802–1822
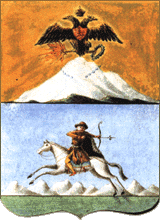
- Coat of arms
- Capital: Georgiyevsk
- History
  - Established: 1802
  - Disestablished: 1822
- Political subdivisions: five uyezds

Caucasus Governorate (Russian: Кавказская губерния, romanized: Kavkazskaya guberniya) was an administrative division (guberniya) of the Russian Empire, which existed from 1802 until 1822. Its seat was located in Georgiyevsk. The governorate was located in the south of the European part of the Russian Empire. In 1822, the governorate was abolished and transformed into Caucasus Oblast, with the administrative center in Stavropol. In terms of modern administrative divisions of Russia, the area of Caucasus Governorate is currently split between Stavropol and Krasnodar Krais, Rostov Oblast, and the Republics of Kabardino-Balkaria, North Ossetia–Alania, Ingushetia, Chechnya, Dagestan, and Kalmykia, with the major part of it being located in Stavropol Krai.

== History ==
Russian colonization of the Northern Caucasus started in the 1770s. In 1785, Caucasus Viceroyalty was established. It consisted of Caucasus Oblast with the seat in Yekaterinograd and Astrakhan Oblast with the seat in Astrakhan. In 1790, Caucasus Oblast was abolished and merged into Astrakhan Governorate. On November 15, 1802 Caucasus Governorate with the administrative center in Georgiyevsk was created. On July 24, 1822 the governorate was transformed into Caucasus Oblast, with the same borders, and its seat was moved to the city of Stavropol.

The governorate consisted of five uyezds (the administrative centers, which all had the town status, are given in parentheses),

- Alexandrovsky Uyezd (Alexandrovsk);
- Georgiyevsky Uyezd (Georgiyevsk);
- Kizlyarsky Uyezd (Kizlyar);
- Mozdoksky Uyezd (Mozdok);
- Stavropolsky Uyezd (Stavropol).

In 1822, when the governorate was abolished, Alexandrovsky Uyezd was also abolished and split between Stavropolsky and Georgiyevsky Uyezds.

== Governors ==
The administration of the governorate was performed by a governor. The governors of Caucasus Governorate were

- 1793-1796 Skarzhinsky, Pyotr Mikhailovich, governor
- 1802–1804 Ivan Petrovich Kasparov, governor;
- 1804-1805 Khristian Petrovich Gildenshold (Christian Gildenschold), governor;
- 1805-1809 Nikolay Mikhaylovich Kartvelin, governor;
- 1809-1811 Mark Leontyevich Malinsky, governor;
- 1811-1813 Yakov Maximovich von Briskorn, governor;
- 1813-1820 Mark Leontyevich Malinsky, governor.

Between 1820 and 1822 the governor position was vacant.
