= Maksharip Aushev =

Ingush-Russian businessman

Maksharip Magometovich Aushev
- Макшарип Магометович Аушев
- Born: 16 February 1966; Surkhakhi, Nazranovsky District, Ingushetia
- Died: 25 October 2009 (aged 43); Nartan, Chegemsky District, Kabardino-Balkaria
- Cause of death: Shot dead by gunmen
- Resting place: Surkhakhi
- Occupation(s): political activist (opposition), businessman

Maksharip Magometovich Aushev (Russian: Макшарип Магометович Аушев; 16 February 1966 – 25 October 2009) was an Ingush businessman and opposition leader in the Republic of Ingushetia, a federal subject of the Russian Federation. Aushev had taken over the opposition website, Ingushetia.org, after its owner, Magomed Yevloyev, a vocal critic of the Ingush government, was shot and killed while in police custody.

== Biography ==
Aushev was a businessman and a member of a prominent Ingushetian family. In 2007, Aushev's son and nephew were both kidnapped. He blamed Ingush security forces under the control of then-President of Ingushetia Murat Zyazikov for the abductions. Aushev organized protests against the security forces and the Zyazikov government.

In 2008, journalist Magomed Yevloyev, the owner of Ingushetia.org and a critic of the Zyazikov government, was shot and killed while in police custody. Aushev personally took over ownership of Ingushetia.org following Yevloyev's death.

The Russian government removed Zyazikov in October 2008 and installed Yunus-Bek Yevkurov as president. Yevkurov offered dissidents in Ingushetia a certain amount of protection from politically motivated attacks. Aushev largely supported Yevkurov policies towards the opposition, and withdrew from his most vocal opposition to the government since Yevkurov's installation. Aushev accepted a position on a human rights council set up by the ombudsman of Russia's federal government. However, he remained a vocal critic of former President Zyazikov and his relatives, as well as the human rights violations allegedly committed by Russian special forces in Ingushetia and Chechnya.

Aushev survived an attempted kidnapping in September 2009. In an interview with an Australian television network, he revealed that he had “very strong information that I was going to be killed” during the failed abduction.

On 25 October 2009, Aushev was shot and killed on the spot when gunmen attacked his car on a road near Nalchik in the neighboring Republic of Kabardino-Balkaria. He was buried in the Ingush village of Surkhakhi.

== Post-death ==
On 8 December 2009, Aushev was posthumously awarded the Russian Federation's human rights ombudsman's medal “Спешите делать добро” (Speshite delat dobro).
