= Disappearance of Ali Astamirov =

Disappearance of a Chechen journalist

Ali Astamirov
- Born: Ali Astamirov c. 1969
- Disappeared: July 4, 2003 (age 34); Ingushetia, Russia
- Status: Missing for 22 years, 9 months and 26 days
- Occupations: Television and print journalist
- Employer: Agence France-Presse

The Disappearance of Ali Astamirov (c. 1969) concerns a Chechen journalist who was working for Agence France-Presse in Ingushetia, Russia, bordering Chechnya, when he was kidnapped at gunpoint by a group of three, uniformed, masked men on 4 July 2003, just outside Nazran. This was during the Second Chechen War.

== Personal ==
Ali Astamirov is a Chechen national. He was 34 years old at the time of his abduction, and he and his wife have two children. According to Reporters Without Borders, Astamirov was receiving anonymous threats while reporting about Chechnya from within Ingushetia, and he took precautions by moving his family and place of residence months before his kidnapping.

== Career ==
Ali Astamirov worked for radio and Grozny Television in Chechnya. From 1998 to October 1999, he worked for the Chechen branch of the then-independent Russian television station NTV (Russia). He left NTV close to the beginning of the renewal of conflict in Chechnya. Around 2001 or 2002, Astamirov became a freelance correspondent for Agence France-Presse. He took on a dangerous reporting assignment for the AFP by reporting on the conflict in Chechnya from Ingushetia. Astamirov had been working for the AFP for a year at the time of his kidnapping.

== Missing ==
Ali Astamirov went missing in Ingushetia, which is the region in dark green.

Ali Astamirov, an Agence France-Presse correspondent, was abducted in Ingushetia while in a car with two other witnesses, a humanitarian worker and a journalist, at a gas station. His two fellow passengers said Astamirov was taken from their vehicle and driven away in another white car by three masked and military camouflage uniformed gunmen headed in the direction of Chechnya on 4 July 2003. The kidnapping incident took place in Altievo, which is a village just outside the former capital city and bordertown of Nazran.

Since the kidnapping, authorities have not heard from kidnappers or learned of any information about his condition but the AFP claims no investigation took place after the disappearance. While his kidnapping is most likely related to controversy over the war in the region, nothing is officially known.

Reporters Without Borders called on Russian President Vladimir Putin to order the revival of the investigation on the second anniversary of his disappearance. "We are very worried about Astamirov because the investigation by the authorities in Nazran and Moscow continues to be paralysed," the organisation said, adding, "Reporters Without Borders will continue to campaign about this case until those responsible have been identified and brought to justice."

== Context ==
Chechens have been targeted by natives of surrounding areas because of conflicting political views and warfare after a decade. After the Second Chechen War ended, President Vladimir Putin ordered Chechnya's restoration under Russia's governance, which was the source of opposition in the surrounding areas. Rivalries between Chechnya and Ingushetia made it difficult for journalists to report on political issues and were threatened. According to the International Federation of Journalists, this is one of the most life-threatening regions for any journalist to report in. Ali Astamirov was just one of the hundreds of correspondents who were abducted as a result of the conflict. There were 278 kidnappings in the first five months of 2003, and 56 people were later found dead while 49 people have not been seen or heard from since.

== Impact ==
The Chechen wars divided surrounding territories and people. Feuds broke out when Chechnya and Ingushetia both wanted to be the dominant and independent republic. Military personnel and government officials experienced terrorism among the republics. Economic and transportation networks were forced out of the region and made to relocate. This separation has made it difficult for anyone involved in press and news media. Non-Chechen journalists and journalists outside of Ingushetia were warned to stay out of certain zones and to not cross Chechen territory.

== Reactions ==
In a series of high-profile meetings in October 2003, Astimirov's disappearance was part of the discussions between Prime Minister of France Jean-Pierre Raffarin and the Prime Minister of Russia Mikhail Kasyanov, as well as between the French Minister of Foreign Affairs Dominique de Villepin and the Foreign Minister of Russia Igor Ivanov.

Friends and family, as well as press freedom organization Reporters Without Borders (RSF) and the union International Federation of Journalists, have publicly called for more information and requested from Vladimir Putin a reopening of his case, but they are unsure of whether he is alive or dead. RSF made a minute long video appeal by Astimirov's brother available for broadcasters. In addition, RSF has brought his case before the European Union and Organization for Security and Co-operation in Europe.

== See also ==
- List of people who disappeared mysteriously: post-1970
- Musa Muradov
- Yelena Masyuk
- Roddy Scott
- Magomed Yevloyev
- Maksharip Aushev
