= Zolsky =

Zolsky (masculine), Zolskaya (feminine), or Zolskoye (neuter) may refer to:

- Zolsky District, a district of the Kabardino-Balkar Republic, Russia
- Zolsky (rural locality) (Zolskaya, Zolskoye), name of several rural localities in Russia
