= Chegem (disambiguation) =

Chegem is a town in the Kabardino-Balkar Republic, Russia

Chegem may also refer to:

- Chegem Urban Settlement, a municipal formation which the town of Chegem in Chegemsky District of the Kabardino-Balkar Republic, Russia is incorporated as
- Chegem (river), a river in the Kabardino-Balkar Republic, Russia
