= Siemens brothers copper-smelting plant =

Siemens brothers copper-smelter plant
- Native name: Siemens Qardaşları mis əritmə zavodu
- Founded: 1865
- Founder: German company "Siemens"
- Defunct: 1914
- Successor: Walter von Siemens

Siemens brothers copper smelting plant - a plant that operated between the mid-19th and the beginning of the 20th century in the Gadabay district of Azerbaijan.

== History ==
In the middle of the nineteenth century, copper ore deposits were discovered in Gadabay region and a copper plant was built by local entrepreneurs between 1855 and 1856. Later this plant was purchased by the German company "Siemens" and rebuilt in 1865. Azerbaijanis, Russians, Germans, Greeks, Bulgarians, Romanians, Italians and others were working in this company.

In 1873, the Siemens brothers carried out another innovation - they built a cableway at the Gadabay mines which were driven by horses. This cable car was used to transport fossil ore in small containers. At that time, coal was considered the most durable and efficient fuel for stoves. But then there was a problem with the regular supply of the Plant with coal, which was imported from Ukraine. Then the Siemens brothers leased a plot of 23 thousand hectares of forest in the foothill area from the Elizavetpol.

Gadabay-Galakend railway of 28 km was constructed between 1879 and 1883. This railway was used to transport combustible materials. There were 4 locomotives and 33 wagons on this railroad.

In 1883 the second copper plant in Galakand was put into operation. In those years, wood fuel was replaced by liquid fuel, exactly with black oil in the Gadabay and Galakend copper plants. In 1885, the Russian-German school under Gadabay Copper Plant started functioning.

In 1887, a fishing far was created in Galakend. Siemens-Billiter Electrolysis Laboratory was installed in Galakend Copper Plant and thus, pure copper was processed.

== Innovations ==
=== Using oil for copper smelting ===
In 1889, another Siemens idea was born - to use oil for copper smelting. Since it was obviously unprofitable to transport oil for long distances by carts, to build an oil pipeline to Gadabay from the village of Deler was decided. In November of the same year, after the brothers' appeal, the Cabinet of Ministers of Russia authorized the construction of the pipeline. At that time, there was no experience in the construction of oil pipelines in mountainous terrain. But the authors of the idea fully believed in the possibility and great economic effect of this enterprise, which surprised the Caucasian Governorate much.

In 1892, an oil pipeline from the Deller railway station to the Chardagli village was laid and in 1894 the pipeline was extended to Gadabay. Besides, the 84-kilometer telegraph line from Ganja city was put into operation.

In 1891, the Galakand plant produced gold and silver by electrolysis. Over 100 million pounds of pure copper ore was extracted in Gadabay. During Siemens' activity, more than 13 kilograms of gold and 240 kilograms of silver were seized from every 18,000 pounds of copper. In 1864–1914, 3 tons of gold, 52 tons of silver and 640 tons of cobalt in 1867–1916 were produced in the Gadabay Mountains.

=== German heritage in Gadabay ===
A brick-tiling plant was built in a short time. At that time, a large number of public buildings, houses were built, new production sites, dozens of bridges, tunnels, and water passages were built in the style of German architecture. Some of these facilities are still in use.

In the Gadabay mining camp, Siemens had their own sales, weekly market, hotel, hospital, theater and dance hall, library, summer and winter walking areas, construction and agricultural products. They had a number of objects that corresponded to the present-day tourism in the Gadabay and Galakand forest massifs such as pedestrian and horse riding, fishing and river swimming, historical and natural monuments, etc.

The year 1900 was marked by the most favorable production indicators, which is associated with the general economic growth in Russia in the early years of the 20th century. Gadabay and Gadabay copper smelters worked until the beginning of the World War I. However, by this time the Siemens had cooled off towards business. Initially, domestic political instability and conflicts in Russia, and then the war dealt a crushing blow to the mining industry. The railway was closed in 1915. In 1920, the enterprises were nationalized by the decree of the Azerbaijan Revolutionary Committee, and in 1923, by a decision of the Council of People's Commissars of the AzSSR, a commission was established to resume the work of the factories. But the commission's activity had no real effect, and the enterprises of the Siemens brothers began to gradually turn into a dead pile of metal and concrete.

== See also ==
- Siemens Brothers
