= Etoko, Russia =

Etoko Этоко

Other transcription(s)
  - Kabardian: Ятӏэкъуэ
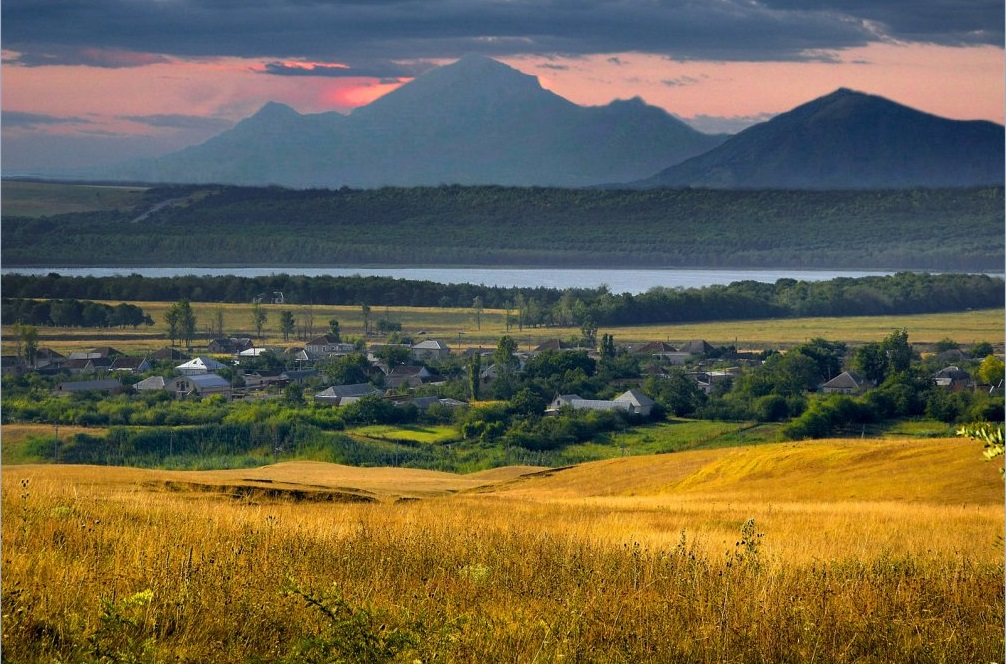
- View of Etoko
- Interactive map of Etoko
- Location of Etoko
- Coordinates: 43°56′46″N 43°10′29″E
- Country: Russia
- Federal subject: Kabardino-Balkaria
- Founded: 1934
- Elevation: 570 m (1,870 ft)

Population
  - Estimate (2025): 767 )
- Time zone: UTC+3 (MSK)
- Postal code: 361707
- OKTMO ID: 83615475101

Etoko (Russian: Этоко; Kabardian: Ятӏэкъуэ, romanized: Yat’eqwe) is a village (selo) in Zolsky District of the Kabardino-Balkarian Republic, Russia, located 6 kilometers (3.7 mi) from Zalukokoazhe.

It is the location of the archaeological site "Etokskoye Gorodishche". The settlement also has a number of social and cultural institutions, including a secondary school, a kindergarten, a healthcare facility, and a district hospital. There is also a house of culture, which serves as a cultural and entertainment center for the village. The community is also home to a number of socio-political organizations, including Adyge Khase, a Council of Elders, and an Islamic mosque.

== Geography ==
Etoko is a village located in the Zolsky district of the Kabardino-Balkarian Republic, Russia. It is the only settlement in the municipality of "Etoko Rural Settlement". The village is situated in the northwestern part of the Zolsky district, near the border of Kabardino-Balkaria with the Stavropol Territory. It is approximately 5 km northwest of the regional center Zalukokoazhe and 10 km southeast of Pyatigorsk. The federal highway "Caucasus" M 29 runs along the southern outskirts of the village.

The area of the rural settlement is 12.5 km2 and borders on the lands of settlements such as Zalukokoazhe in the southeast and Tambukan and Zeleny of the Stavropol Territory in the west and east, respectively. The village of Etoka is located 5 km southwest of the village of Etoko.

The settlement is located in the foothill zone of the Kabardino-Balkarian Republic and has an undulating piedmont plain terrain. The elevation difference in the area is about 500 meters, with the average height in the village being 570 meters above sea level. The mountains of Pyatigorye rise in the west of the village.

The hydrographic network in the area is represented by the Etoka river. Lake Tambukan and Dry Lake, which are part of the Tambukan Lake nature reserve and known for their healing properties and silt mud, are located 2 km north of the village, between Kabardino-Balkaria and the Stavropol Territory.

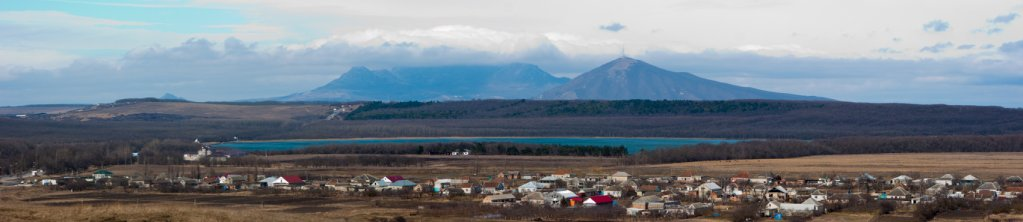
Autumn panorama of Etoko

== History ==
Etoko was formed in 1934 by settlers from the village of Malka, who were allowed to move to their own land and establish a new settlement. The first settlers were families of the Bizhevs, Kardanovs, Marzhokhovs, Muratovs, Ogurlievs, Tatarkanovs, Teuvazhukovs, Unashkhotlovs, Shkhanukovs and others.

In the first years of its existence, Etoko was subordinate to the Zalukokoazh Village Council, but later it was given the status of an independent municipality. During World War II, the village was occupied and looted by German troops in August 1942. It was liberated from the invaders at the end of January 1943.

In memory of the fallen villagers and soldiers who died during the war, monuments were erected in the village. Today, Etoko is unofficially referred to as the "gates of Kabardino-Balkaria" as high-ranking guests of the republic are met and seen off here.

== Demography ==
Historical population
Year	Pop.	±%
2002	907	—
2010	845	−6.8%
2012	832	−1.5%
2013	833	+0.1%
2014	835	+0.2%
2015	837	+0.2%
2016	834	−0.4%
2017	832	−0.2%
2018	827	−0.6%
2019	819	−1.0%
2020	816	−0.4%
2021	779	−4.5%

The population density is 62.32 people / km 2 .

=== National composition ===
Nationality	Population	Percentage of Population
Kabardians	827	97.9%
Russians	10	1.2%
other	8	0.9%
Total	845	100%
