= Ustur =

- Location within Russia

Highest point
- Elevation: 2,556 m (8,386 ft)
- Coordinates: 39.70188°N 44.29831°E

Ustur is a mountain in the North Caucasus. It is located in Chegem (Russia). It is 2556 m high.
