= Caucasus Viceroyalty =

Caucasus Viceroyalty may refer to:

- Caucasus Viceroyalty (1785–1796)
- Caucasus Viceroyalty (1801–1917)
