= Nartkala (disambiguation) =

Nartkala is a town in the Kabardino-Balkar Republic, Russia.

Nartkala may also refer to:

- Nartkala Urban Settlement, a municipal formation which the town of Nartkala in Urvansky District of the Kabardino-Balkar Republic, Russia is incorporated as
- FC Aruan Nartkala (1995–2007), a former soccer team from the town of Nartkala, Kabardino-Balkar Republic, Russia
