= Tersky District, Kabardino-Balkarian Republic =

Tersky District Терский район (Russian)
- District

Other transcription(s)
  - Kabardian: Тэрч къедзыгъуэ
  - Karachay-Balkar: Терк район
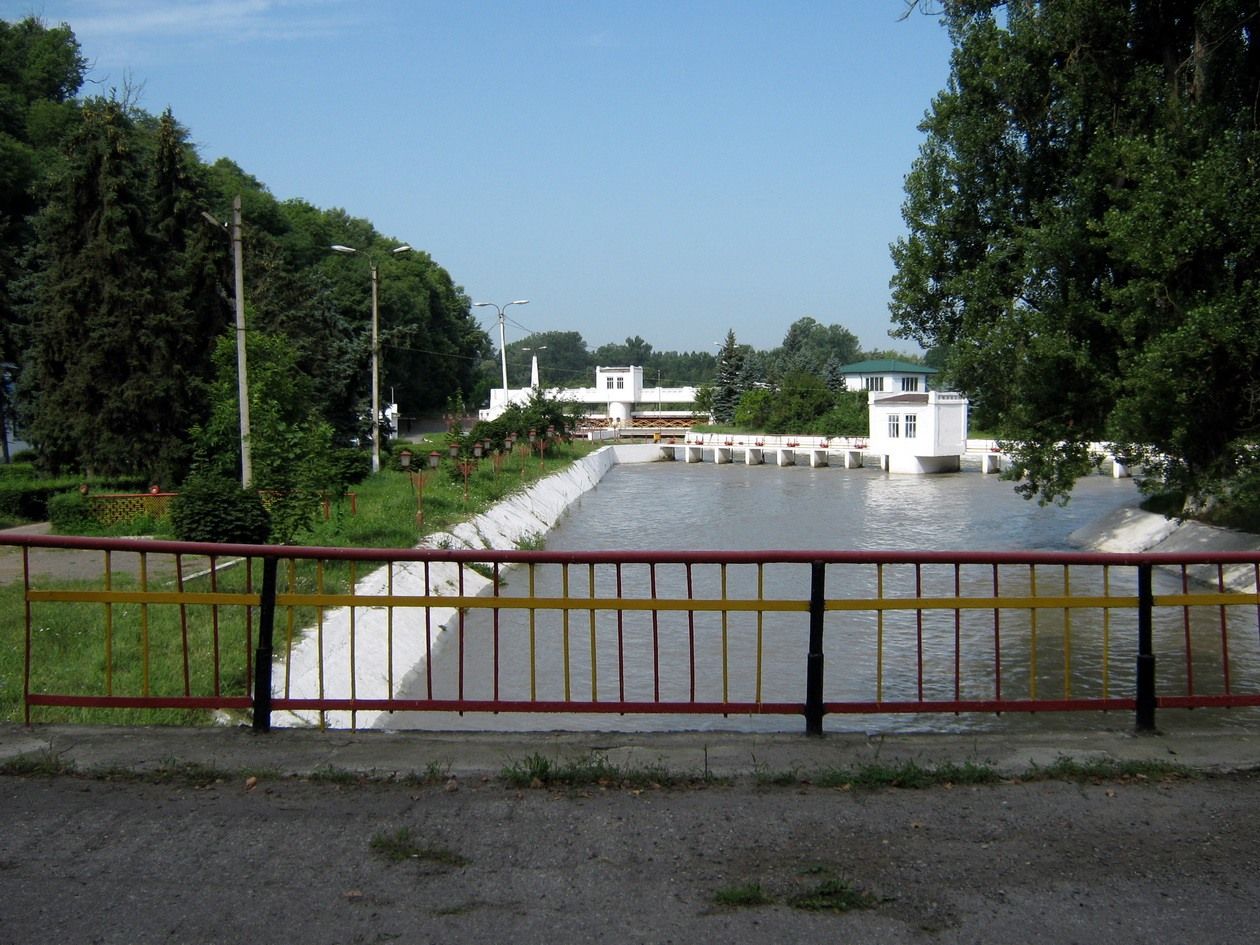
- Dzhulat Malokabardinsky channel, Tersky District

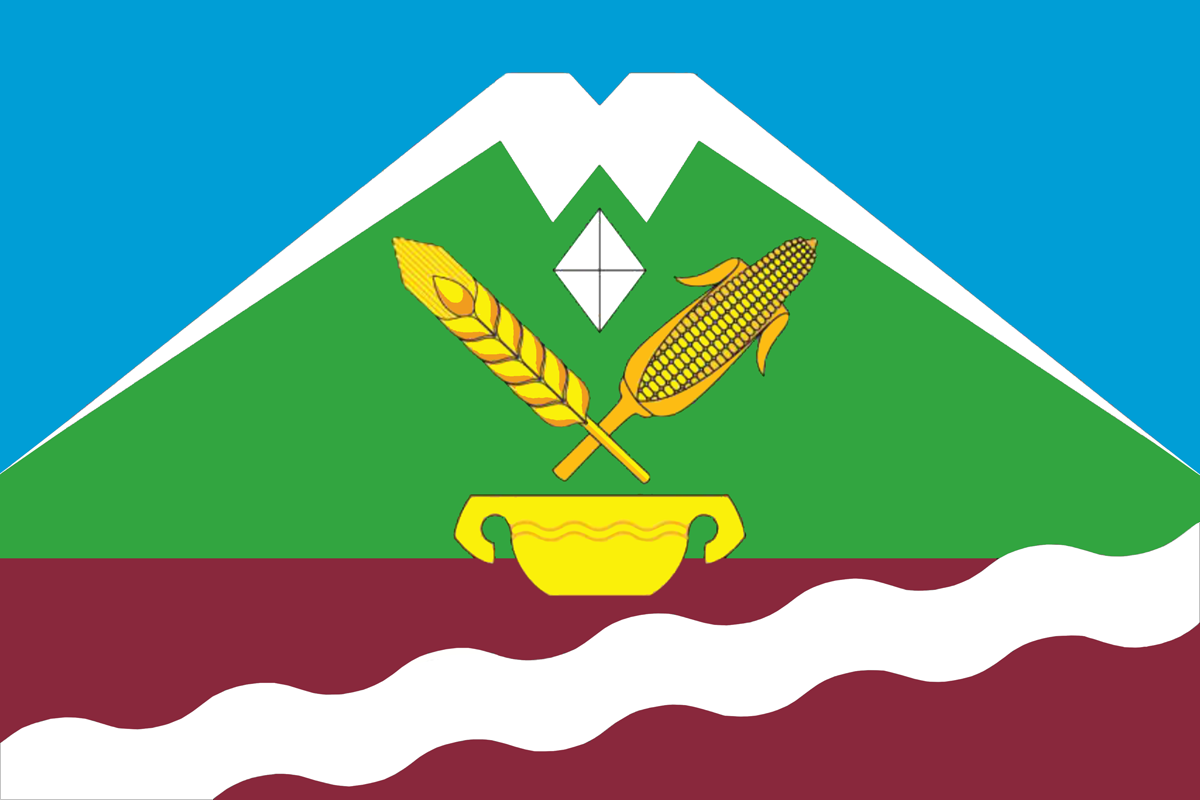
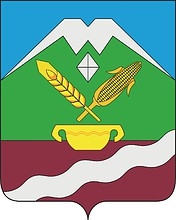
- Flag Coat of arms
- Location of Tersky District in the Kabardino-Balkarian Republic
- Coordinates: 43°29′N 44°08′E
- Country: Russia
- Federal subject: Kabardino-Balkarian Republic
- Established: 1921
- Administrative center: Terek

Area
  - Total: 893.12 km^{2} (344.84 sq mi)

Population (2010 Census)
  - Total: 51,220
  - Density: 57.35/km^{2} (148.5/sq mi)
  - Urban: 37.4%
  - Rural: 62.6%

Administrative structure
  - Inhabited localities: 1 cities/towns, 26 rural localities

Municipal structure
  - Municipally incorporated as: Tersky Municipal District
  - Municipal divisions: 1 urban settlements, 17 rural settlements
- Time zone: UTC+3 (MSK)
- OKTMO ID: 83635000
- Website: http://te.adm-kbr.ru

Population of Tersky District
- 2010 Census: 51,220
- 2002 Census: 52,976
- 1989 Census: 46,245
- 1979 Census: 42,814

Tersky District (Russian: Те́рский райо́н; Kabardian: Тэрч къедзыгъуэ; Karachay-Balkar: Терк район) is an administrative and a municipal district (raion), one of the ten in the Kabardino-Balkarian Republic, Russia. It is located in the east of the republic. The area of the district is 893.12 square kilometers (344.84 sq mi). Its administrative center is the town of Terek. As of the 2010 Census, the total population of the district was 51,220, with the population of Terek accounting for 37.4% of that number.

== Administrative and municipal status ==
Within the framework of administrative divisions, Tersky District is one of the ten in the Kabardino-Balkarian Republic and has administrative jurisdiction over one town (Terek) and twenty-six rural localities. As a municipal division, the district is incorporated as Tersky Municipal District. The town of Terek is incorporated as an urban settlement and the twenty-six rural localities are incorporated into seventeen rural settlements within the municipal district. The town of Terek serves as the administrative center of both the administrative and municipal district.
