= Lesken =

Lesken Лескен Хутигъæу
- Selo
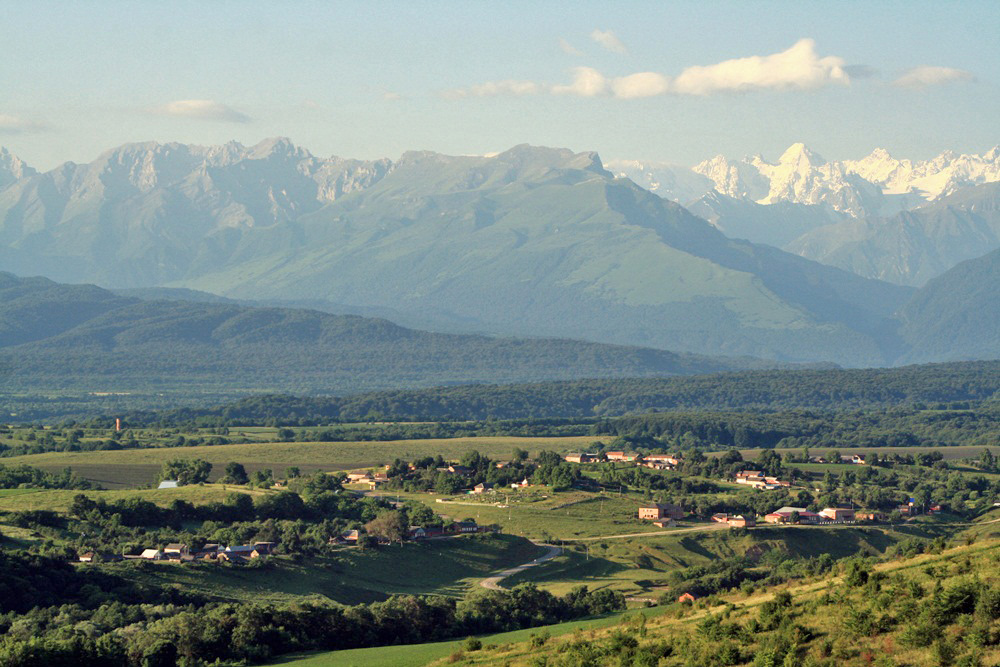
- View of Lesken

- Location in North Ossetia–Alania Lesken (Russia)
- Coordinates: 43.274115°N 43.819007°E
- Country: Russia
- Federal subject: North Ossetia–Alania
- District: Irafsky
- Founded: c. 1864

Area
  - Total: 13.59 km^{2} (5.25 sq mi)
- Elevation: 778 m (2,552 ft)

Population (2025)
  - Total: 1,891
- Time zone: UTC+3 (MSK)

Lesken (Russian and Iron Ossetic: Лескен), historically Khutighæu (Iron Ossetic: Хутигъæу) is a rural locality (selo) in Irafsky District of the Republic of North Ossetia–Alania, Russia. It is the only inhabited locality and the administrative center of Leskenskoe Rural Settlement.

== Geography ==
Lesken is located in the northwestern part of Irafsky District on the left bank of the Lesken River. The village lies approximately 18 km northwest of Chikola, the administrative center of the district, and about 93 km northwest of Vladikavkaz, the capital of North Ossetia–Alania.

The surrounding area is characterized by hilly terrain and forms part of the foothill zone of the North Caucasus. The territory of Leskenskoe Rural Settlement covers approximately 13.59 km², most of which consists of agricultural land situated on a river terrace. Nearby rural localities include Yerokko to the north, Toldzgun to the southeast, and Verkhny Lesken to the southwest.

== History ==
Lesken was founded around 1864, when Muslim Ossetians from the Digor Gorge relocated to areas closer to their fellow Muslim Kabardians. Land in the Lesken River valley was purchased from Kabardian princes of the Andzorov family for a small fee, and settlers arrived from the Donifarskoye, Stur-Digorskoye, and Mahcheskoye Ossetian communities.

Prior to the establishment of the Mountain Autonomous Soviet Socialist Republic, Lesken and its surrounding territory were administratively part of Kabarda. They were later incorporated into the Ossetian Okrug and subsequently into North Ossetia.

== Economy ==
The local economy is based primarily on agriculture and small-scale industry. Industrial enterprises operating in the village include the private company Vesna, which produces food products including cocoa fat, and the closed joint-stock company Sever, which specializes in the manufacture of workwear.

== Infrastructure ==
Social infrastructure in Lesken includes a secondary school named after M. Kh. Karaev, a preschool institution known as Teremok, and a local outpatient medical clinic.

== Religion ==
In the early 20th century, three mosques operated in Lesken. All were closed during the Soviet anti-religious campaigns of the 1930s, with only one surviving. The surviving mosque reopened in the late 1980s but was later closed due to the deterioration of the building. Following reconstruction, it was reopened in 2013.

== Cultural heritage ==
An obelisk commemorating residents of Lesken who died during World War II stands in the center of the village. A mass grave of Soviet soldiers killed in 1942 during battles for the liberation of Lesken is also located in the village. This burial site is listed as a cultural heritage monument of federal significance.

== Notable people ==
- Magomet Isayev (1928–2011), linguist
