= Zolsky (rural locality) =

Zolsky (Russian: Зо́льский; masculine), Zolskaya (Зо́льская; feminine), or Zolskoye (Зо́льское; neuter) is the name of several rural localities in Russia:

- Zolskoye, a selo in Zolsky District of the Kabardino-Balkar Republic
- Zolskaya, a stanitsa in Zolsky Selsoviet of Kirovsky District of Stavropol Krai
