= Maysky District =

Maysky District Майский район (Russian)
- District

Other transcription(s)
  - Kabardian: Майскэ къедзыгъуэ
  - Karachay-Balkar: Май район
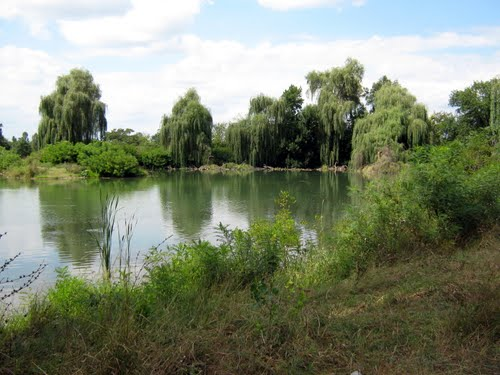
- A lake near the selo of Oktyabrskoye in Maysky District

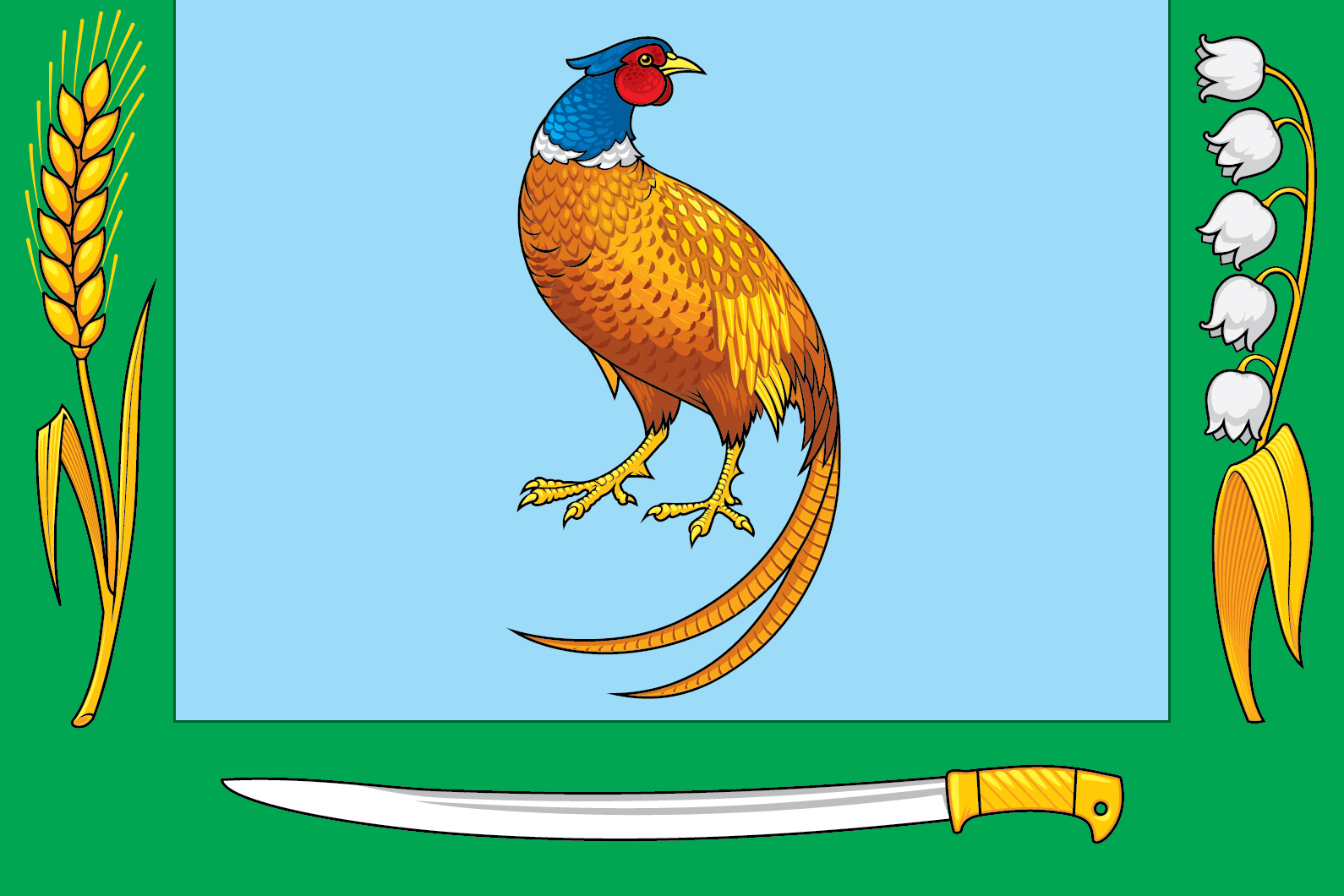
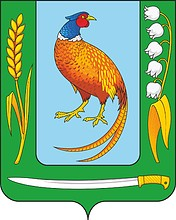
- Flag Coat of arms
- Location of Maysky District in the Kabardino-Balkarian Republic
- Coordinates: 43°38′N 44°04′E
- Country: Russia
- Federal subject: Kabardino-Balkarian Republic
- Established: 1937
- Administrative center: Maysky

Area
  - Total: 384.76 km^{2} (148.56 sq mi)

Population (2010 Census)
  - Total: 38,625
  - Density: 100.39/km^{2} (260.00/sq mi)
  - Urban: 69.3%
  - Rural: 30.7%

Administrative structure
  - Inhabited localities: 1 cities/towns, 15 rural localities

Municipal structure
  - Municipally incorporated as: Maysky Municipal District
  - Municipal divisions: 1 urban settlements, 4 rural settlements
- Time zone: UTC+3 (MSK)
- OKTMO ID: 83620000
- Website: http://www.mayadmin-kbr.ru

Population of Maysky District
- 2010 Census: 38,625
- 2002 Census: 40,051
- 1989 Census: 35,990
- 1979 Census: 33,423

Maysky District (Russian: Ма́йский райо́н; Kabardian: Майскэ къедзыгъуэ; Karachay-Balkar: Май район) is an administrative and a municipal district (raion), one of the ten in the Kabardino-Balkarian Republic, Russia. It is located in the east of the republic. The area of the district is 384.76 square kilometers (148.56 sq mi). Its administrative center is the town of Maysky. As of the 2010 Census, the total population of the district was 38,625, with the population of the administrative center accounting for 69.3% of that number.

== Administrative and municipal status ==
Within the framework of administrative divisions, Maysky District is one of the ten in the Kabardino-Balkarian Republic and has administrative jurisdiction over one town (Maysky) and fifteen rural localities. As a municipal division, the district is incorporated as Maysky Municipal District. The town of Maysky, together with five rural localities, is incorporated as an urban settlement, while the remaining ten rural localities are incorporated into four rural settlements within the municipal district. The town of Maysky serves as the administrative center of both the administrative and municipal district.
