= Toldzgun =

Toldzgun Толдзгун (Russian) Тулдзджын (Iron Ossetic)
- Selo
- Location within North Ossetia–Alania Location within Russia
- Coordinates: 43°13′48.1″N 43°49′12.3″E
- Country: Russia
- Federal subject: North Ossetia–Alania
- District: Irafsky
- Founded: 1903
- Elevation: 797 m (2,615 ft)

Population (2025)
  - Total: 376
- Time zone: UTC+3

Toldzgun (Russian: Толдзгун; Iron Ossetic: Тулдзджын, romanized: Tuldzžyn) is a rural locality (a selo) in the Irafsky District of the Republic of North Ossetia–Alania, Russia. It serves as the administrative center of the Toldzgun rural settlement.

== Geography ==
Toldzgun is located in the interfluve of the Bolshoy Kasalkun and Maly Kasalkun rivers, approximately 12 km west of Chikola, the district administrative center, and 87 km northwest of Vladikavkaz, the capital of the republic. The settlement lies at an elevation of 797 meters above sea level. It neighbors the villages of Lesken in the north and Khaznidon in the southeast.

== Etymology ==
The name of the village in Ossetian translates to "oak grove".

== Population ==
As of 2025, Toldzgun has a population of 376, predominantly Ossetians of the Digor subgroup.
