= Magomet Isayev =

Russian Esperantist, translator and linguist (1928–2011)

- Исати Мӕхӕмӕт
- Born: March 5, 1928; Lesken, North Ossetian AO, Russian SFSR, Soviet Union
- Died: June 20, 2011 (aged 83); Moscow, Russia
- Education: Faculty of Oriental Studies at Leningrad State University

Magomet Izmaylovich Isayev (Russian: Магоме́т Изма́йлович Иса́ев; Iron Ossetic: Исаты Измаилы фырт Мӕхӕмӕт; March 5, 1928 – June 20, 2011) was a Russian Esperantist, translator, and linguist of Digor Ossetian ethnicity. He is most notable for his work on Iranian languages (primarily Ossetic) and Esperanto.
