= Prokhladny, Kabardino-Balkarian Republic =

Town in the Kabardino-Balkar Republic, Russia

Prokhladny Прохладный
- Town
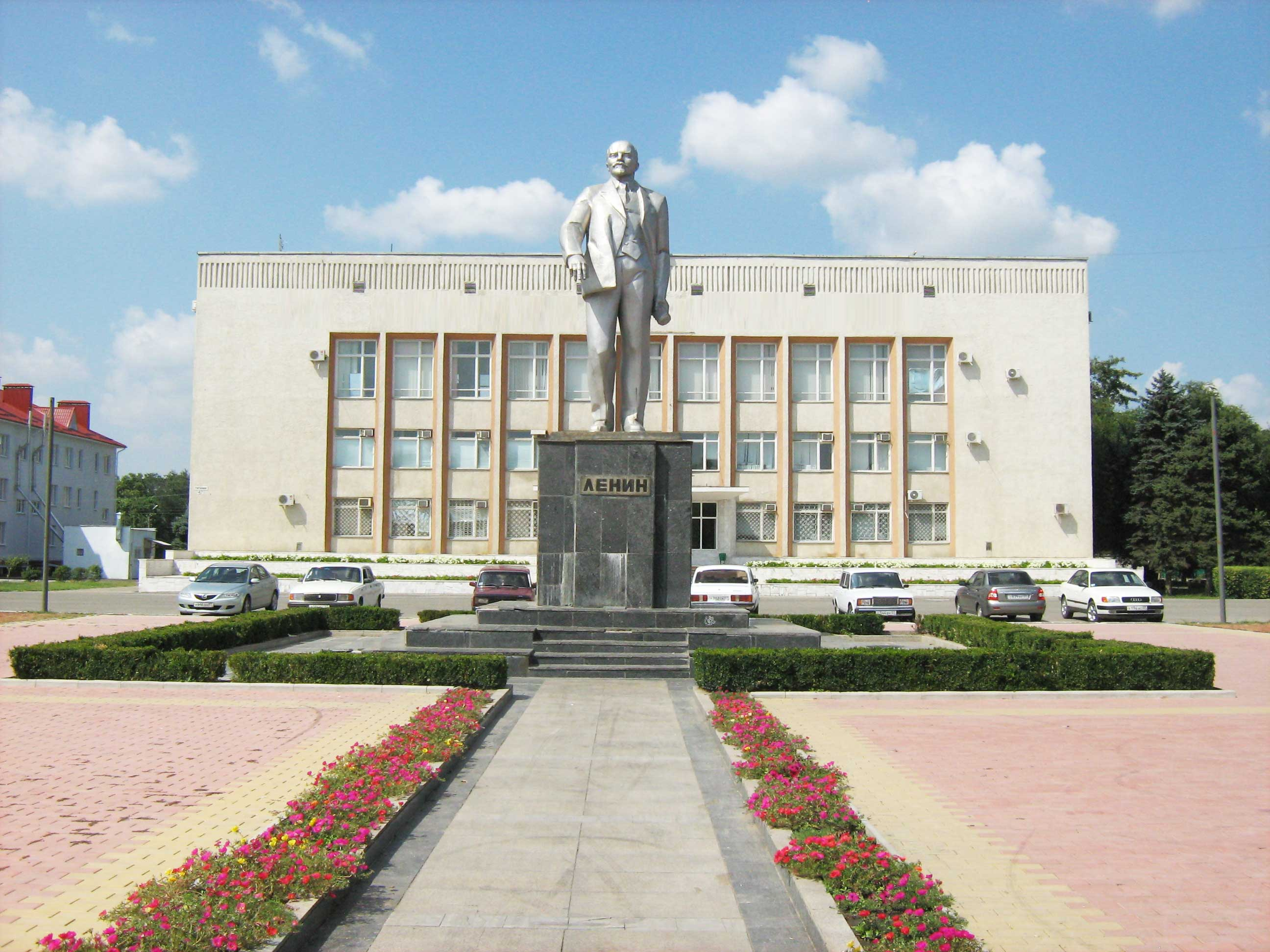
- Prokhladny Town Administration building (2016)

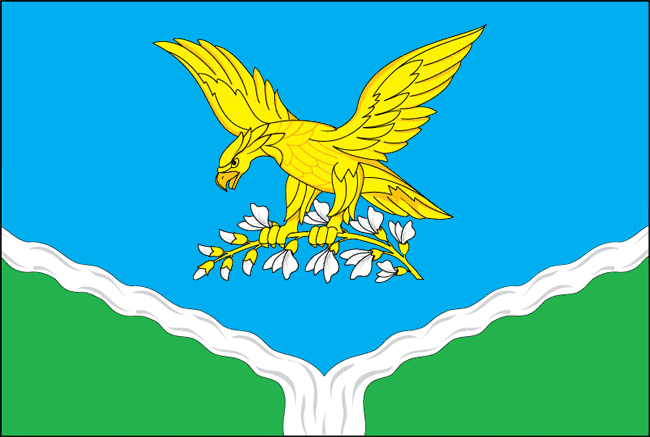
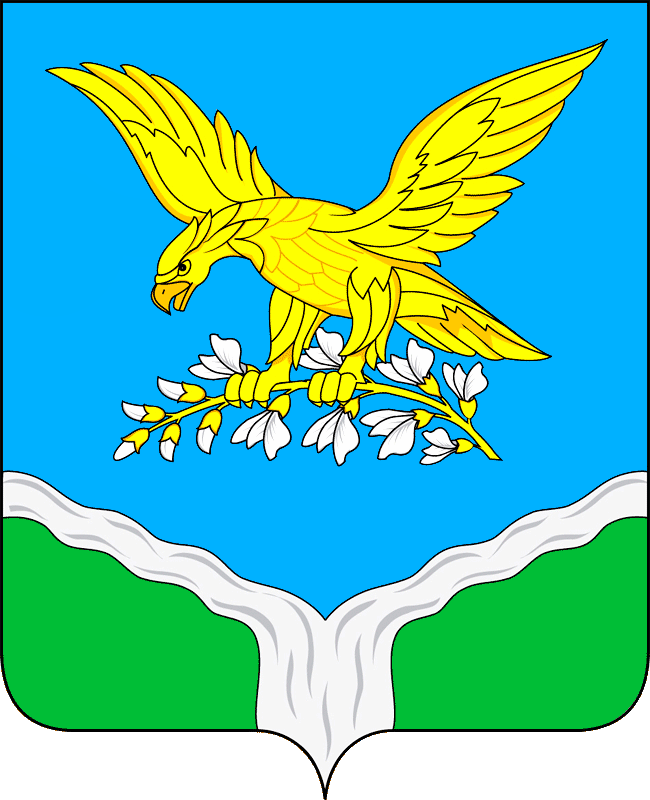
- Flag Coat of arms
- Interactive map of Prokhladny
- Location of Prokhladny Prokhladny (European Russia) Prokhladny (Russia)
- Coordinates: 43°45′N 44°02′E
- Country: Russia
- Federal subject: Kabardino-Balkaria
- Founded: 1765
- Town status since: 1937

Government
  - Head: Yuliya Parkhomenko
- Elevation: 214 m (702 ft)

Population (2010 Census)
  - Total: 59,601
  - Estimate (2025): 60,009 (+0.7%)
  - Rank: 278th in 2010

Administrative status
  - Subordinated to: town of republic significance of Prokhladny
  - Capital of: Prokhladnensky District, town of republic significance of Prokhladny

Municipal status
  - Urban okrug: Prokhladny Urban Okrug
  - Capital of: Prokhladny Urban Okrug, Prokhladnensky Municipal District
- Time zone: UTC+3 (MSK)
- Postal code: 361000
- Dialing code: +7 86631
- OKTMO ID: 83710000001
- Website: admprohladnyi.ru

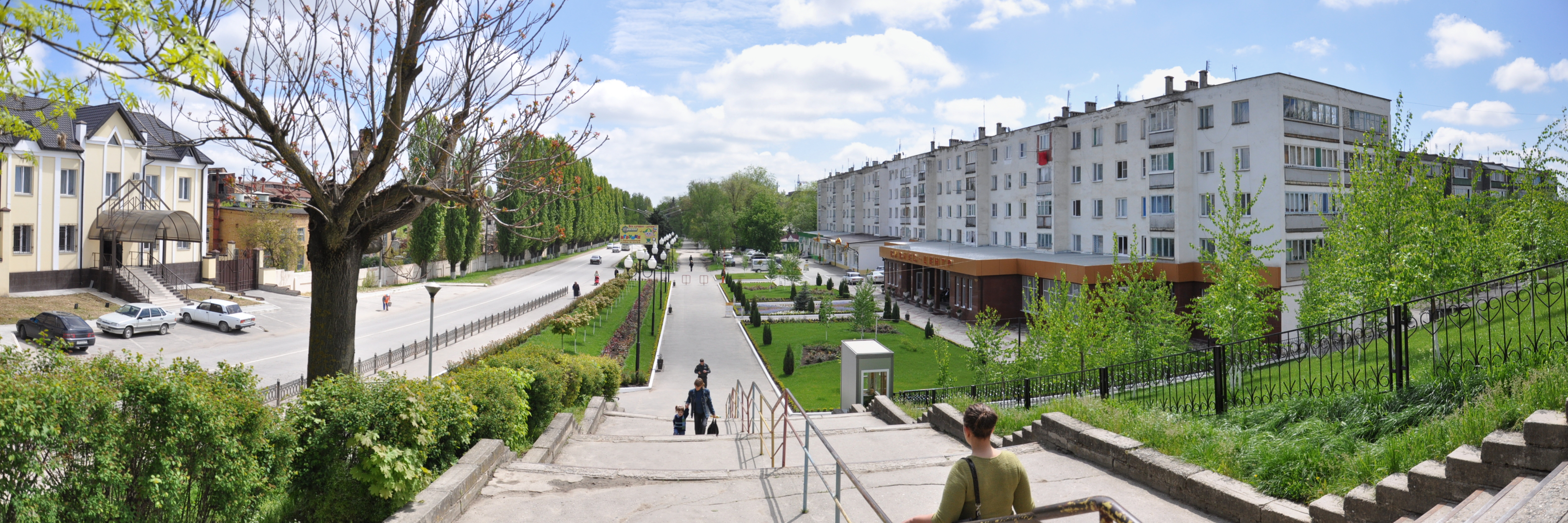
A residential area in Prokhladny

Prokhladny (Russian: Прохла́дный; Kabardian: КъалэкӀыхь, Прохладнэ; until 1937 Prokhladnaya, Russian: Прохладная) is a town in the Kabardino-Balkarian Republic, Russia, located on the Malka River, 60 kilometers (37 mi) north of Nalchik. Population: 59,601 (2010 census); 61,772 (2002 census); 57,084 (1989 Soviet census).

== History ==
It was founded in 1765 by Zaporozhian Cossacks.

According to the 1926 census, the settlement had a population of 3,280, of which 61.1% were Russians and 32.0% were Ukrainians.

== Administrative and municipal status ==
Within the framework of administrative divisions, Prokhladny serves as the administrative center of Prokhladnensky District, even though it is not a part of it. As an administrative division, it is incorporated separately as the town of republic significance of Prokhladny—an administrative unit with the status equal to that of the districts. As a municipal division, the town of republic significance of Prokhladny is incorporated as Prokhladny Urban Okrug.

== Demographics ==
In 2002, the population included:

- Russians (79.1%)
- Koreans (3.3%)
- Kabardians (3.1%)
- Ukrainians (2.5%)
- Turks (1.8%)
- Germans (1.5%)

== Notable people ==
- Mariya Lasitskene, Olympic champion and three-time world champion in high jump.

== Transportation ==
There is large railway station in the town.
