= Yekaterinogradskaya =

Yekaterinogradskaya Екатериноградская
- Stanitsa
- Interactive map of Yekaterinogradskaya
- Location of Yekaterinogradskaya Yekaterinogradskaya (Kabardino-Balkaria)
- Coordinates: 43°46′N 44°14′E
- Country: Russia
- Federal subject: Kabardino-Balkaria
- Administrative district: Prokhladnensky District
- Elevation: 168 m (551 ft)

Population (2010 Census)
  - Total: 3,675
  - Estimate (2025): 3,655 (−0.5%)
- Time zone: UTC+3 (MSK)
- Postal code: 361015
- OKTMO ID: 83625410101

Yekaterinogradskaya (Russian: Екатериногра́дская) is a rural locality (a stanitsa) in Prokhladnensky District of the Kabardino-Balkar Republic, Russia, located near the confluence of the Malka and Terek Rivers. Population: 3,675 (2010 census);

== History ==
Between 1785 and 1790, Yekaterinogradskaya (then the town of Yekaterinograd) was the seat of Caucasus Oblast, one of two parts (along with Astrakhan Oblast) of Caucasus Viceroyalty. In 1790, the oblast was abolished and merged into Astrakhan Governorate.
