= Ingushetia.org =

Ingush news website

Ingushetia.org (Ингушетия.org; formerly ingushetiya.ru) is a non-government Ingush news agency and web site and was owned by Magomed Yevloyev. Its server is located in the United States.

== History ==
The site was launched on August 8, 2001 by owner and chief editor Magomed Yevloev. The site often contained materials that the government of Ingushetia did not officially agree with.

In 2007 Yevloev stopped editing the website and announced, that he would be no longer involved with the editorial policy. He worked in its own lawyers’ practice in Moscow but remained the website’s owner.

The website has been accused of "inciting inter-ethnic hatred" by the public prosecutor of North Ossetia and came under numerous hacker attacks in 2007. The portal also organized the I have not voted! action in Ingushetia after the 2007 Russian legislative elections, gathering more than 57,000 signatures of people who had not voted. The aim of the action was to demonstrate that the official results of the regional voting (98% turnout and 99% support of United Russia) were false. According to Ingushetia.ru, and as reported in Chechnya Weekly, access to the portal by people within Ingushetia was blocked by Ingush authorities in November 2007.

On June 6, 2008, by a court decision, the site was recognized as a resource distributing extremist materials aimed at inciting hatred or enmity. The Ingush prosecutor's office was the plaintiff in the case. By court order, the site should be closed. After the Kuntsevo court ruled to close the site, Yevloyev's lawyers decided to appeal it to the Moscow City Court. As a result, the decision of the Kuntsevsky District Court was upheld. The site was included in the Federal List of Extremist Materials. The chief editor of Ingushetia.ru, Roza Malsagova, asked for political asylum in France. She is now in Paris.

On September 25, 2008, the Ingushetia.ru website lost its domain name, and it was changed to Ingushetia.org.

In July 2009, on the initiative of the chairman of the public movement "Fair Ingushetia", a member of the expert council under the Human Rights Ombudsman in the Russian Federation, Magomed Khazbiev, a new opposition resource with a similar name appeared on the Internet. According to the owner of the new site, the need to create the portal was due to the fact that recently “thanks to the efforts of the new leadership of the republic, the Ingushetia.org portal has softened its oppositional orientation, which naturally excludes the independence and objectivity of this resource in the context of the civil war, which has been going on in Ingushetia for the last seven years.” In contrast to the existing portal, Magomed Khazbiev initiated the creation of the Ingushetia.org website, which should support and preserve the traditions of Ingushetiya.ru, which belonged to Magomed Yevloyev.

On October 25, 2009, the site owner, Maksharip Aushev was shot dead in Nalchik.

== Murder of Yevloyev ==
On August 31, 2008, the website's owner and a vocal critic of the government, Magomed Yevloyev, was shot dead while in police custody. Around the same time, the website was shut down by hackers, something that had happened multiple times in the past.

Since September 25, 2008, the domain ingushetiya.ru ceased to operate and the address of the web portal was changed to ingushetia.org.

== See also ==
- Maksharip Aushev (1966-2009)
