= Chereksky District =

Chereksky District Черекский район (Russian)
- District

Other transcription(s)
  - Kabardian: Шэрэдж къедзыгъуэ
  - Karachay-Balkar: Черек район
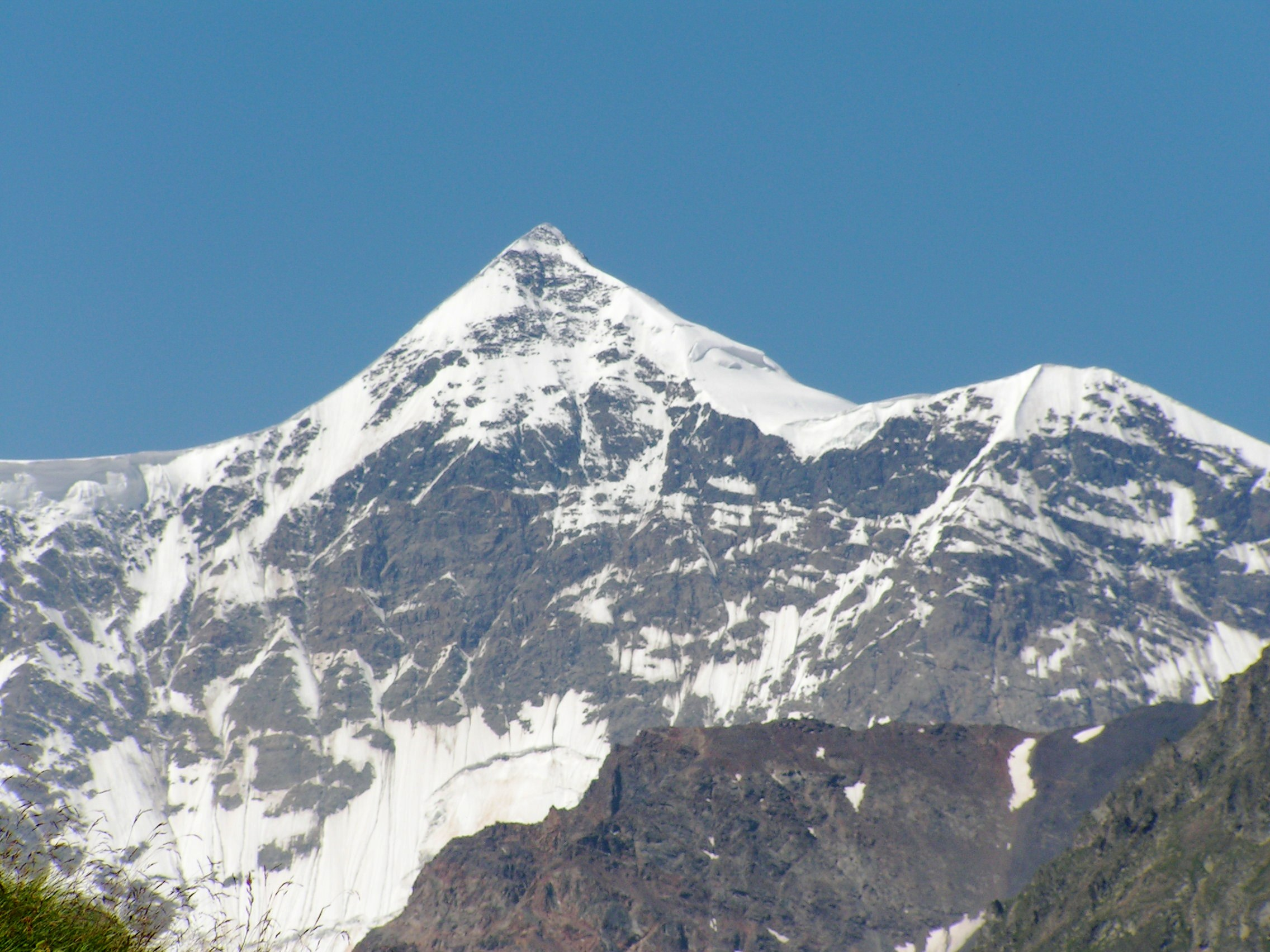
- Mount Gestola in Chereksky District

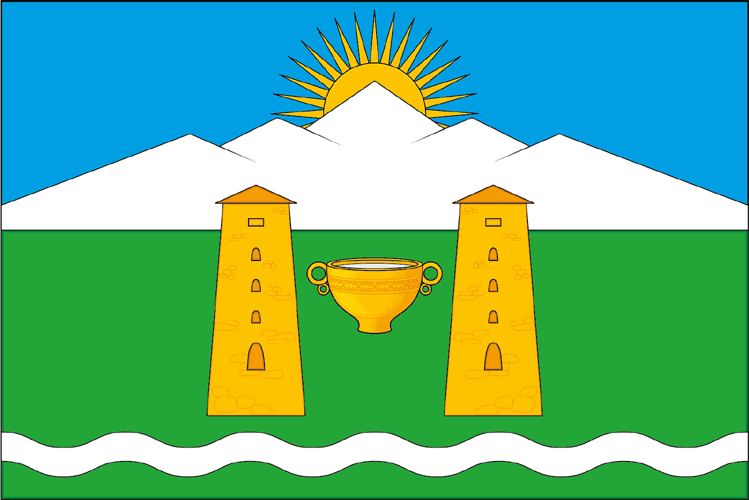
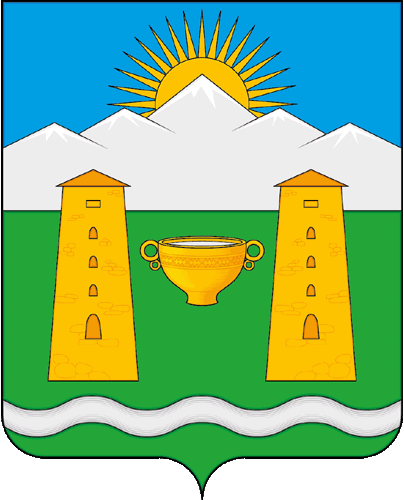
- Flag Coat of arms
- Location of Chereksky District in the Kabardino-Balkar Republic
- Coordinates: 43°19′N 43°36′E
- Country: Russia
- Federal subject: Kabardino-Balkar Republic
- Established: 28 January 1935
- Administrative center: Kashkhatau

Area
  - Total: 2,210 km^{2} (850 sq mi)

Population (2010 Census)
  - Total: 26,956
  - Density: 12.2/km^{2} (31.6/sq mi)
  - Urban: 19.6%
  - Rural: 80.4%

Administrative structure
  - Inhabited localities: 10 rural localities

Municipal structure
  - Municipally incorporated as: Chereksky Municipal District
  - Municipal divisions: 1 urban settlements, 9 rural settlements
- Time zone: UTC+3 (MSK)
- OKTMO ID: 83630000
- Website: http://cr.adm-kbr.ru

Population of Chereksky District
- 2010 Census: 26,956
- 2002 Census: 25,927
- 1989 Census: 22,079
- 1979 Census: 21,603

Chereksky District (Russian: Черекский райо́н; Kabardian: Шэрэдж къедзыгъуэ; Karachay-Balkar: Черек район, Çerek rayon) is an administrative and a municipal district (raion), one of the ten in the Kabardino-Balkar Republic, Russia. It is located in the central and southern parts of the republic. The area of the district is 2,210 square kilometers (850 sq mi). Its administrative center is the rural locality (a settlement) of Kashkhatau. As of the 2010 Census, the total population of the district was 26,956, with the population of Kashkhatau accounting for 19.6% of that number.

== History ==
The district was called Sovetsky (Сове́тский) until May 5, 1994.

== Administrative and municipal status ==
Within the framework of administrative divisions, Chereksky District is one of the ten in the Kabardino-Balkar Republic and has administrative jurisdiction over all of its ten rural localities. As a municipal division, the district is incorporated as Chereksky Municipal District. Its rural localities are incorporated into nine rural settlements within the municipal district, with the exception of the settlement of Kashkhatau, which is incorporated as Kashkhatau Urban Settlement. The settlement of Kashkhatau serves as the administrative center of both the administrative and municipal district.
