= Caucasus Viceroyalty (1785–1796) =

Viceroyalty of the Russian empire (1785–1796)

Caucasus Viceroyalty Кавказское наместничество
- Viceroyalty of the Russian Empire
- 1785–1796
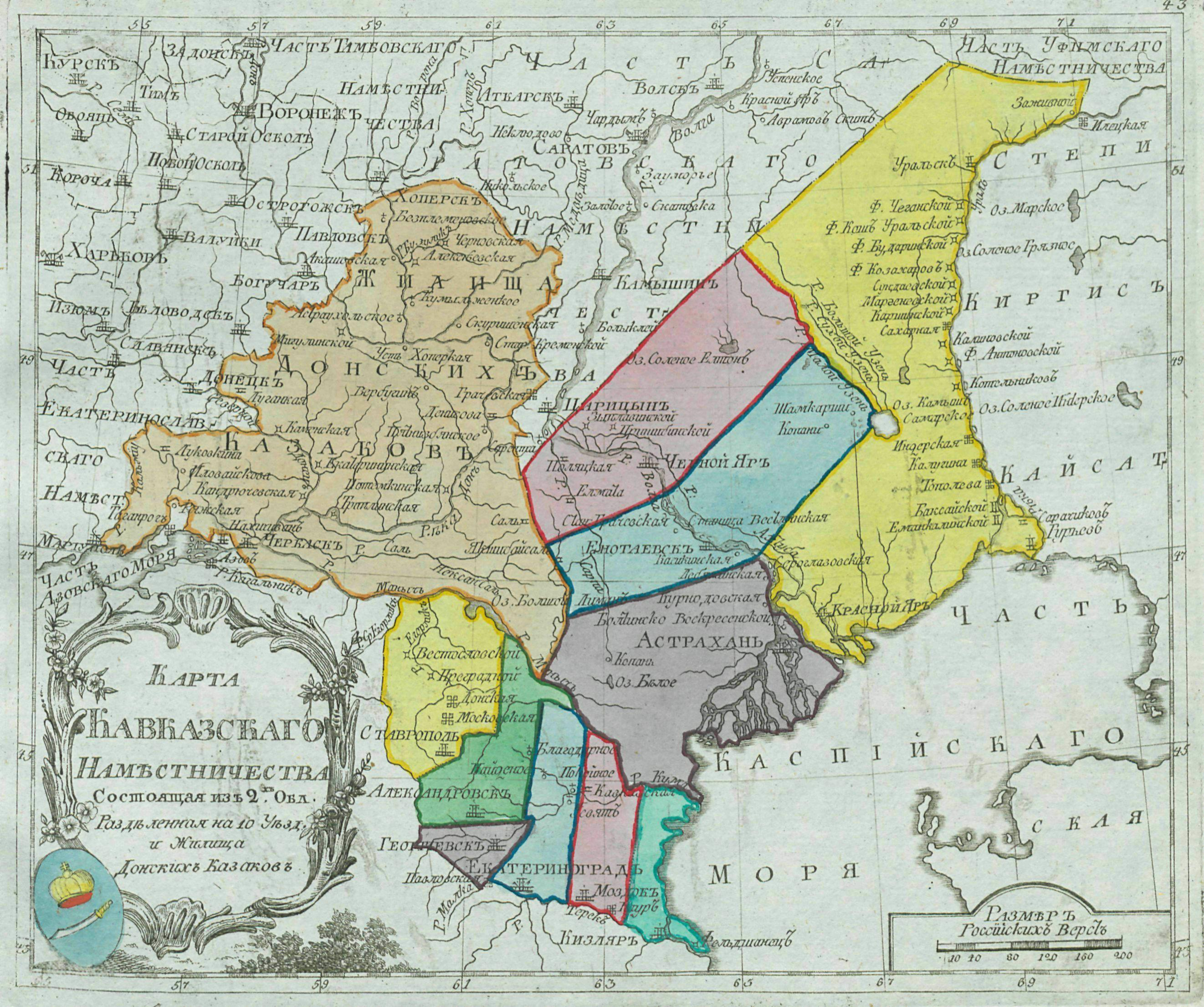
- Capital: Yekaterinograd
  - Type: Viceroyalty
- History
  - Established: 1785
  - Disestablished: 1796
Preceded by	Succeeded by
Taurida Oblast; Astrakhan Governorate	Astrakhan Governorate

The Caucasus Viceroyalty (Russian: Кавказское наместничество) was established in 1785 by Catherine the Great by combining the Astrakhan Governorate and the Caucasus Governorate. It was abolished by Paul I in 1796.

== Viceroys ==
The five viceroys or heads of the viceroyalty were:

time	name	life span
1785–1787	Pavel Sergeevich Potemkin	1743–1796
1787–1789	Pyotr Abramovich Tekelli	1720−1793
1789–1790	Ivan Petrovich Saltykov	1730–1805
1790	Anton Bogdanovich de Balmen	1741–1790
1790–1796, 1796–1798, 1806–1809	Ivan Vasilyevich Gudovich	1741–1820
