= Urvansky District =

Urvansky District Урванский район (Russian)
- District

Other transcription(s)
  - Kabardian: Аруан къедзыгъуэ
  - Karachay-Balkar: Урван район
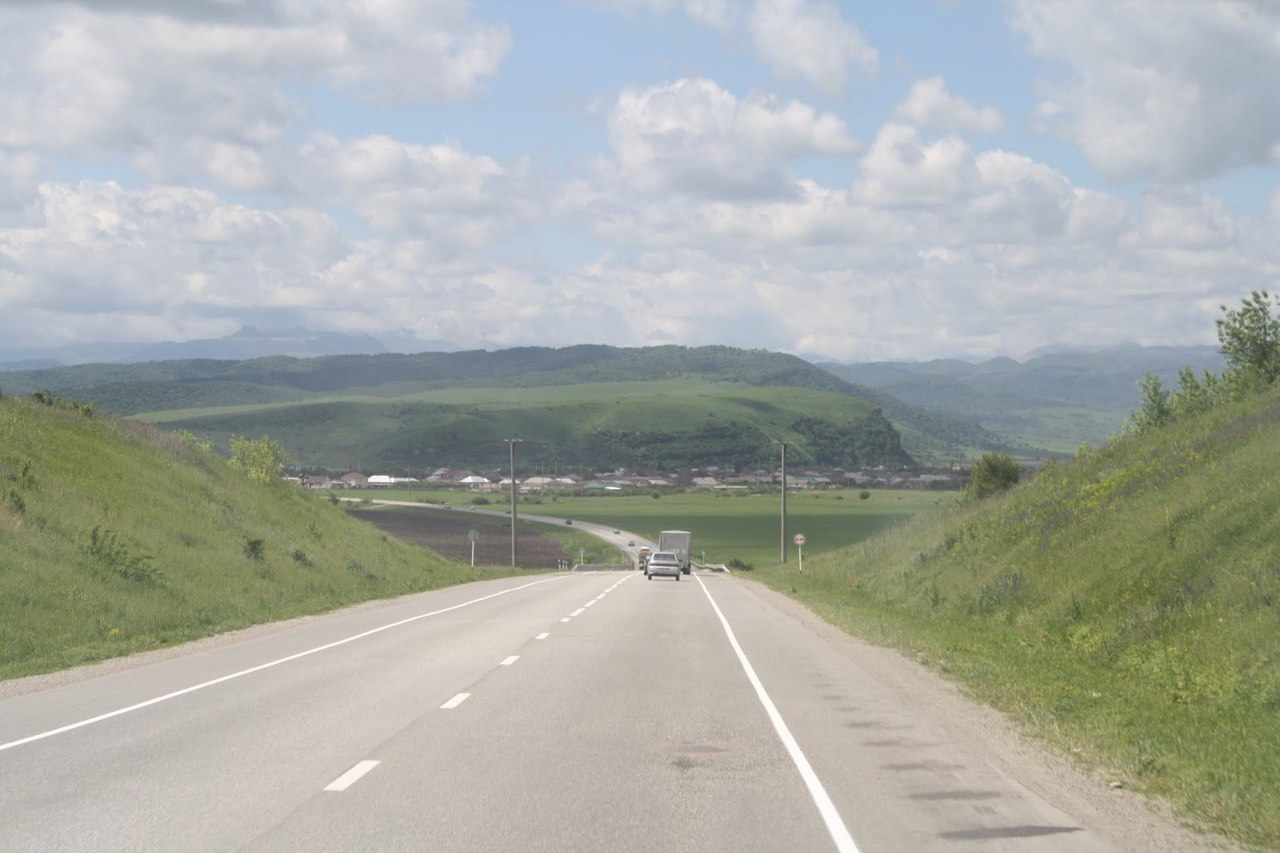
- Psyguensu, Urvansky District

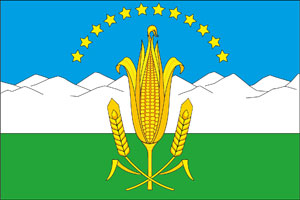
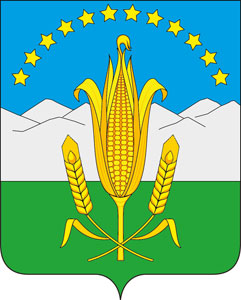
- Flag Coat of arms
- Location of Urvansky District in the Kabardino-Balkarian Republic
- Coordinates: 43°33′N 43°51′E
- Country: Russia
- Federal subject: Kabardino-Balkar Republic
- Established: 1 September 1921
- Administrative center: Nartkala

Area
  - Total: 458 km^{2} (177 sq mi)

Population (2010 Census)
  - Total: 71,782
  - Density: 157/km^{2} (406/sq mi)
  - Urban: 44.2%
  - Rural: 55.8%

Administrative structure
  - Inhabited localities: 1 cities/towns, 12 rural localities

Municipal structure
  - Municipally incorporated as: Urvansky Municipal District
  - Municipal divisions: 1 urban settlements, 11 rural settlements
- Time zone: UTC+3 (MSK)
- OKTMO ID: 83640000
- Website: http://www.ur.adm-kbr.ru

Population of Urvansky District
- 2010 Census: 71,782
- 2002 Census: 104,126
- 1989 Census: 82,727
- 1979 Census: 74,437

Urvansky District (Russian: Урва́нский райо́н; Kabardian: Аруан къедзыгъуэ; Karachay-Balkar: Урван район) is an administrative and a municipal district (raion), one of the ten in the Kabardino-Balkarian Republic, Russia. It is located in the east of the republic. The area of the district is 458 square kilometers (177 sq mi). Its administrative center is the town of Nartkala. As of the 2010 Census, the total population of the district was 71,782, with the population of Nartkala accounting for 44.2% of that number.

== Administrative and municipal status ==
Within the framework of administrative divisions, Urvansky District is one of the ten in the Kabardino-Balkarian Republic and has administrative jurisdiction over one town (Nartkala) and twelve rural localities. As a municipal division, the district is incorporated as Urvansky Municipal District. The town of Nartkala is incorporated as an urban settlement and the twelve rural localities are incorporated into eleven rural settlements within the municipal district. The town of Nartkala serves as the administrative center of both the administrative and municipal district.
