= Maysky, Kabardino-Balkarian Republic =

Town in the Kabardino-Balkarian Republic, Russia

Maysky Майский
- Town

Other transcription(s)
  - Kabardian: Майскэ
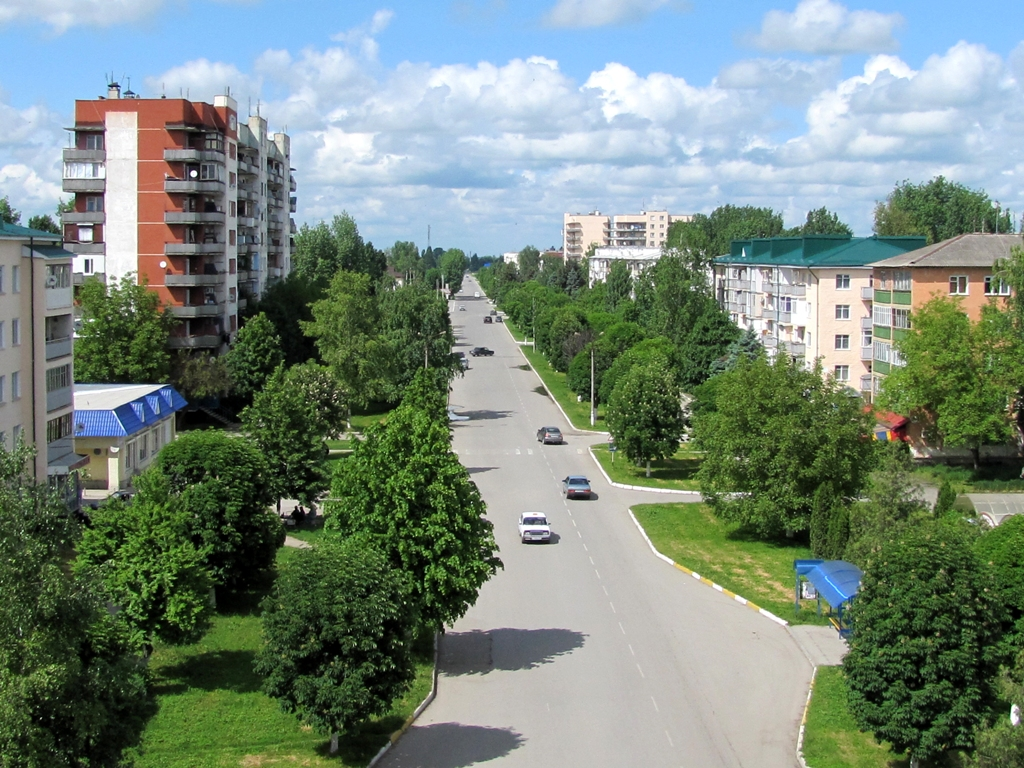
- View of Maysky

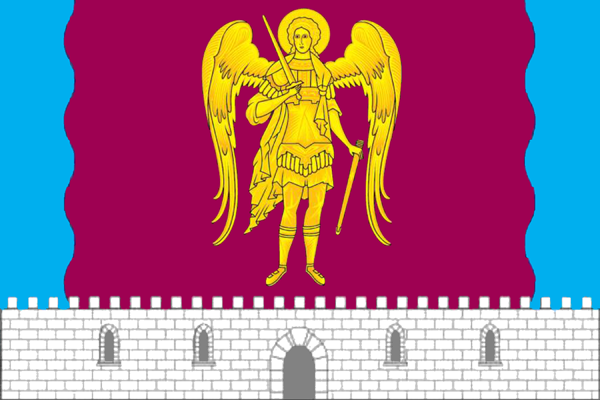
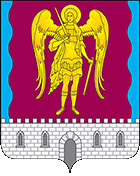
- Flag Coat of arms
- Interactive map of Maysky
- Location of Maysky Maysky (Russia)
- Coordinates: 43°39′N 44°04′E
- Country: Russia
- Federal subject: Kabardino-Balkaria
- Administrative district: Maysky District
- Founded: 1888
- Town status since: 1965
- Elevation: 217 m (712 ft)

Population (2010 Census)
  - Total: 26,755
  - Estimate (2025): 26,210 (−2%)

Administrative status
  - Capital of: Maysky District

Municipal status
  - Municipal district: Maysky Municipal District
  - Urban settlement: Maysky Urban Settlement
  - Capital of: Maysky Municipal District, Maysky Urban Settlement
- Time zone: UTC+3 (MSK)
- Postal code: 361110–316115
- OKTMO ID: 83620101001
- Website: www.mayadmin-kbr.ru/ops/pos/1241.html

Maysky (Russian: Ма́йский; Kabardian: Майскэ) is a town and the administrative center of Maysky District of the Kabardino-Balkarian Republic, Russia, located 40 kilometers (25 mi) northeast of Nalchik, the capital of the republic. Population: 26,755 (2010 census).

== History ==
A Russian military outpost of Prishib was founded in 1824. It was re-organized as the stanitsa of Prishibskaya in 1829. In 1875, Kotlyarevskaya railway station was built 3 kilometers (1.9 mi) south of the stanitsa, and a settlement formed around it in 1888. In 1920, that settlement was renamed Prishibsky, in 1925—Maysky. In 1959, the settlement and the stanitsa were merged into the urban-type settlement of Maysky, which was granted town status in 1965.

== Administrative and municipal status ==
Within the framework of administrative divisions, Maysky serves as the administrative center of Maysky District, to which it is directly subordinated. As a municipal division, the town of Maysky, together with five rural localities, is incorporated within Maysky Municipal District as Maysky Urban Settlement.

== Demographics ==
Population: 26,755 (2010 census); 27,037 (2002 census); 24,533 (1989 Soviet census).

=== Ethnic composition ===
As of the 2002 Census, the ethnic distribution of the population was:

- Russians: 74.2%
- Turks: 7.8%
- Koreans: 3.8%
- Kabardins: 3.7%
- Ukrainians: 2.0%
- Other ethnicities: 8.5%
