= Nartan (selo) =

Rural locality in Chegemsky District, Kabardino-Balkar Republic, Russia

Coordinates: 43°31′N 43°42′E

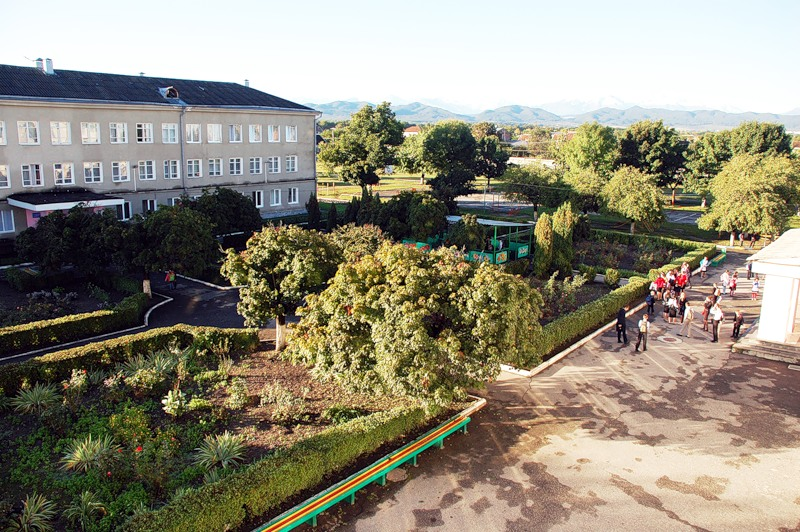
School yard in Nartan

Nartan (Russian: Нартан; Kabardian: Нартанэ) is a city in the North Caucasus in Chegemsky District of the Kabardino-Balkarian Republic, Russia, located on the right bank of the Nalchik River, 5.5 kilometers (3.4 mi) east of Nalchik, the capital of the republic. Population: 12,813 (2010 census); 12,325 (2002 census).

== Geography ==
Nartan is situated in the Kabardian Valley of the foothills of surrounding Greater Caucasus mountains located further south. The outskirt of the area, known locally as Upper Nartan, joins the urban sprawl of eastern Nalchik.

== History ==
Until 1924, the village was called Klishbiyevo (Клишбиево) after the noble family that owned it. Most of the members of the Klishbiy family were forced to immigrate to today's Turkey in 1860s. And they founded a village in Kayseri, a mid-Anatolian city, with the same name. The village was named Kılıç Mehmet, who was head of the family.

== Demographics ==
The majority of the population are ethnic Kabardians. There is, however, also a number of Turkish and Russian inhabitants.

== Economy ==
Prior to the dissolution of the Soviet Union, locals were mainly occupied in rural economy. The Nartan collective farm had sufficient land holdings and a material and technical basis for a farming economy. The main crops grown are cereals, such as maize, wheat, barley, rye, and sunflower. In addition, fruits, such as apples and pears, and vegetables were grown, and livestock such as cattle was maintained. As a collective farm, households had individual plots of lands attached for growing for personal consumption and occasionally for market. Some households in Nartan continue to maintain the original personal use lands as gardens.

Community and consumer facilities include the local government building, a village club house, a supermarket, three schools, including two secondary and one elementary school, an outpatient clinic (now a village hospital), and a kindergarten. There is also a boarding school for the orphans.

At present, the population of the village—mainly females—is self-employed working on the lands attached to their residences. The unemployment rate is very high for both qualified and unqualified labor. The leaseholders of the former collective farm properties as the employers are not able to provide the population with suitable work. In the end, the people leave for earnings and for good to Central Russia or foreign countries.

== Notable residents ==
- Soslanbek Klishbiyev, the last representative of the princely family that owned the village. He served as the head of the Nalchik Okrug in 1910–1917. He was executed by the local Bolsheviks under the leadership of Betal Kalmykov soon after the October Revolution.
- Bekmurza Mashevich Pashev, an epic poet and folklorist, who invented his own Arabic script alphabet to write poems in his native tongue.
- Oleg Oprishko, a historian, the author of books on the history of Kabardino-Balkaria.
