= Kashkhatau =

Rural locality in Kabardino-Balkaria, Russia

Coordinates: 43°19′07″N 43°36′31″E

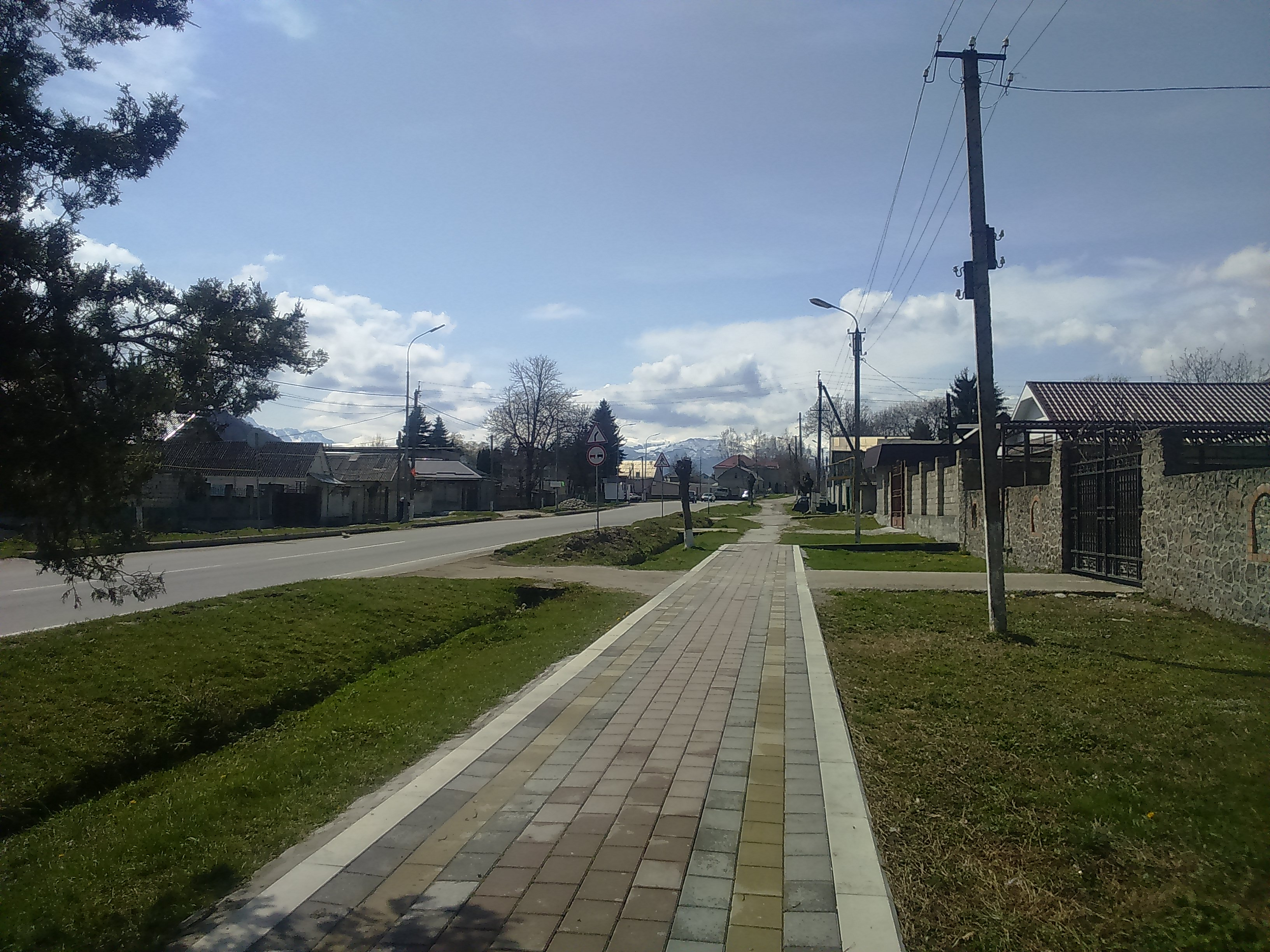
Kashkhatau village

Kashkhatau (Russian: Кашхатау, Karachay-Balkar: Къашхатау, Qaşxatau; Kabardian: Къашхьэтау) is a rural locality (a settlement) and the administrative center of Chereksky District of the Kabardino-Balkar Republic, Russia. Population: 5,295 (2010 census); 5,211 (2002 census); 4,412 (1989 Soviet census).
