= Terek, Kabardino-Balkarian Republic =

Town in the Kabardino-Balkarian Republic, Russia

Terek Терек
- Town

Other transcription(s)
  - Kabardian: Тэрч къалэ
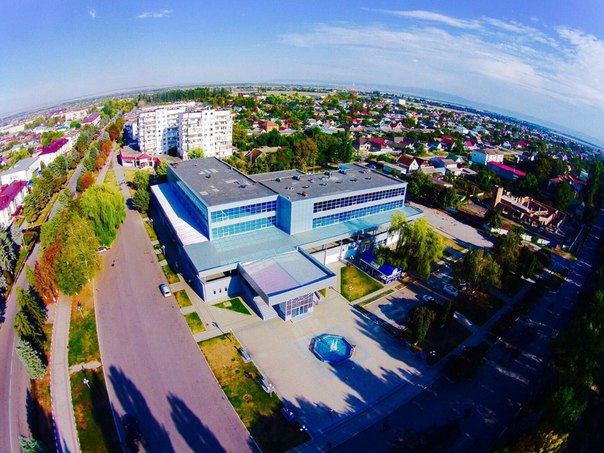
- View of Terek

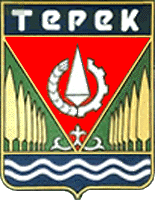
- Coat of arms
- Interactive map of Terek
- Location of Terek Terek (Kabardino-Balkaria)
- Coordinates: 43°29′N 44°08′E
- Country: Russia
- Federal subject: Kabardino-Balkaria
- Administrative district: Tersky District
- Founded: 1876
- Town status since: 1967

Area
  - Total: 12 km^{2} (4.6 sq mi)
- Elevation: 254 m (833 ft)

Population (2010 Census)
  - Total: 19,170
  - Estimate (2025): 20,154 (+5.1%)
  - Density: 1,600/km^{2} (4,100/sq mi)

Administrative status
  - Capital of: Tersky District

Municipal status
  - Municipal district: Tersky Municipal District
  - Urban settlement: Terek Urban Settlement
  - Capital of: Tersky Municipal District, Terek Urban Settlement
- Time zone: UTC+3 (MSK)
- Postal code: 361200–361203
- Dialing code: +7 86632
- OKTMO ID: 83635101001
- Website: te.adm-kbr.ru/index.php?option=com_content&view=article&id=407&Itemid=238

Terek (Russian: Терек; Kabardian: Тэрч къалэ or Тэрч) is a town and the administrative center of Tersky District of the Kabardino-Balkarian Republic, Russia, located on the right bank of the Terek River, 59 kilometers (37 mi) east of Nalchik. Population: 19,170 (2010 census).

== History ==
Founded in 1876, it was granted urban-type settlement status in 1945 and town status in 1967.

== Administrative and municipal status ==
Within the framework of administrative divisions, Terek serves as the administrative center of Tersky District, to which it is directly subordinated. As a municipal division, the town of Terek is incorporated within Tersky Municipal District as Terek Urban Settlement.

== Demographics ==
Population: 19,170 (2010 census); 20,255 (2002 census); 16,559 (1989 Soviet census).

=== Ethnic composition ===
As of the 2002 Census, the ethnic distribution of the population was:

- Kabardins: 82.8%
- Russians: 12.0%
- Ossetians: 1.3%
- Other ethnicities: 3.9%

== Notable people ==
- Dzhambulat Khatokhov – heaviest child in the world in 2003 according to Guinness World Records
