= Magomed Yevloyev =

Russian journalist (1971–2008)

- Магомед Евлоев
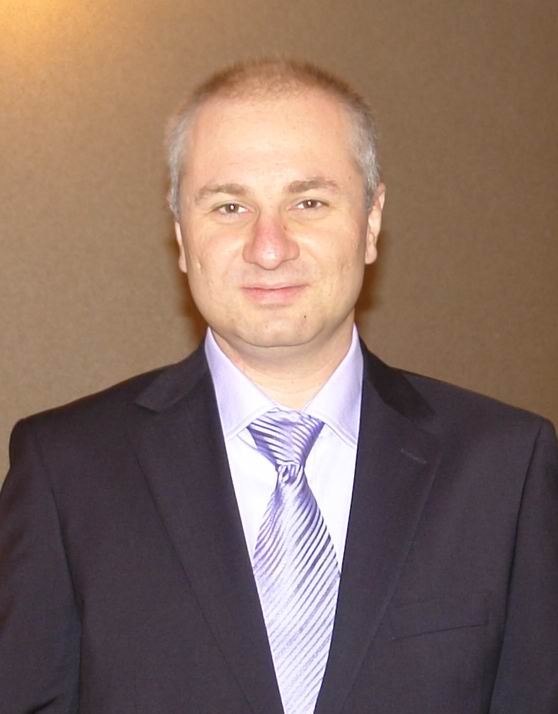
- Yevloyev in 2007
- Born: 22 November 1971; Malgobek, Chechen-Ingush ASSR, Soviet Union
- Died: 31 August 2008 (aged 36)
- Occupations: Journalist, lawyer and businessman

Magomed Yakhyаvich Yevloyev (Russian: Магомед Яхьявич Евлоев; 22 November 1971 – 31 August 2008) was a Russian journalist, lawyer, and businessman, and the owner of the news website Ingushetiya.ru, known for being highly critical of Murat Zyazikov, the President of Ingushetia, a federal subject of Russia locating in the North Caucasus region. Magomed Yevloyev is not to be confused with the Ingush rebel leader Akhmed Yevloyev, who is also known as Magomed, or with the 20-year-old also named Magomed Yevloyev who is suspected of being a suicide bomber in the Domodedovo International Airport bombing.

== Early life and education ==
Magomed Yevloyev was born in the town of Malgobek, Chechen-Ingush Autonomous Soviet Socialist Republic (now in the Republic of Ingushetia, Russia) in 1971. In 1992, Yevloyev graduated from Saratov Law Institute (Саратовский Юридический Институт).

== Career ==
After graduation, Yevloyev began to work as a public procurator in Ingushetia. He soon became the Deputy Chief Procurator of Malgobek. In 1999, he was accused of complicity in the murder of Suleyman Tsechoyev, who was at that time imprisoned as a kidnapper. Allegedly Yevloyev had signed the permit allowing the murderers to take Tsechoyev from his cell. The accusations were not proven but Yevloyev resigned from his post as a prosecutor.

In 2001, Yevloyev founded the Moscow legal firm Infra-Yur. In 2008, the firm became Infra Holding, a company which oversaw construction, fishing, legal firms, and security bureaus. It also controlled Infra North America, a daughter firm operating in the United States. Yevloyev was the president of this holding.

Also in 2001, Yevloyev created the website "Ingushetia.ru". Originally there was no intention to make an opposition website; Yevloyev planned to host a neutral collection of materials on the history and culture of the Ingush people, without favoring any particular point of view. But he soon found that historical and cultural materials often included explosive political content as well, and the site became a source of political materials, such as information on the Second Chechen War, counter-terrorist operations, the Ossetian–Ingush conflict, and kidnappings and murders in Ingushetia. Many of these materials were highly critical of Ingushetia President Murat Zyazikov and his government.

In July 2007, the public procurator of Moscow's Kuntsevo municipality initiated a criminal case accusing Yevloyev of "inciting inter-ethnic hatred", though in the end Yevloyev was never indicted for any criminal activities. In October 2007, the Tsechoyev murder case was reopened and Yevloyev's family house in Malgobek was searched. After the search, Yevloyev's father, Yakhyu Yevloyev, convinced his son to publicly sever all ties with the Ingushetia.ru site, as it appeared to be too dangerous. Since then, the site has been controlled by an editorial committee chaired by Ibragim Kostoyev.

Yevloyev did not, however, completely withdraw from the politics of Ingushetia. He was one of the organizers of the I did not vote campaign, intended to expose mass voter fraud in Ingushetia during the 2008 Russian presidential election. According to official data, 98% of eligible Ingushetia voters took part in the elections, almost all voting for Dmitry Medvedev. But Yevloyev alleged that less than half of registered voters had actually participated in the elections, and therefore sought to compile a list of people who could personally guarantee that they did not vote in the election. If the list proved to include more than 2% of Ingushetia's voting registry, it might constitute proof of massive election fraud.

Yevloyev also organized and financed a campaign collecting signatures calling for the removal of Ingushetia President Zyazikov, and the restoration of the previous Ingushetia president Ruslan Aushev.

In the beginning of 2008, the office of the Ingushetia public procurator initiated hearings in Kuntsevo Court, demanding that access to the site Ingushetia.ru be restricted. According to the prosecutors, in an interview with Ingushetia businessman Musa Keligov hosted on the site, Keligov directly accused Zyazikov of connections with guerillas. The prosecutors argued that this material constituted libel as well as "public advocacy of extremist activity". In May 2008, the court issued an injunction demanding that Russian providers "limit access to the site by filtering its IP addresses". In June 2008, the court characterized the site as "extremist" and demanded its closure. The site was not closed. According to Ingushetia.ru's lawyer Kaloy Akhilgov, since the site is registered in the United States, it is therefore outside the jurisdiction of Russian courts. Akhilgov also stated that the decision is technically incorrect because it classifies the site under the heading "mass media" despite the fact that the site is not officially registered as such. Akhilgov added that they intended to appeal the court decision.

== Death ==
On 31 August 2008, Magomed Yevloyev was shot in the temple and killed while in police custody. Weeks before his killing, it was rumoured that Magomed knew his life was in danger and he had planned on seeking political asylum in a European Union country. Local police claimed that Yevloyev was shot after he had attempted to grab an assault rifle from one of the police officers in the car. Human rights groups have rejected this account of Yevloyev's death, and the United States State Department has called for an investigation of the killing and for those responsible to be "held to account for what happened". A spokesman for Vladimir Putin has said that an investigation will take place, but that Yevloyev had resisted arrest.

In July 2008, Human Rights Watch documented dozens of arbitrary detentions, disappearances, acts of torture, and extrajudicial executions in Ingushetia.

The Organization for Security and Co-operation in Europe denounced Yevloyev's killing as an "assassination" aimed at cracking down on dissent in Ingushetia. The killing also triggered calls for Ingushetia's independence from Russia. The organizer of the protest rally, Magomed Khazibiyev, declared that the Ingush opposition would demand independence, appealing to Russia's recognition of Georgia's breakaway Abkhazia and South Ossetia as precedent.

The funeral of Yevloyev developed into an anti-government protest, in which, according to organizers, several thousands participated. Early on 2 September, police dispersed a sleeping crowd of around 50 men who remained in the main square in Nazran, Ingushetia's capital city.

His death investigation case is classified as "Murder by negligence" according to the Criminal Code of Russia. Another criminal case for his illegal detention (according to the investigators, police did not have the right to arrest him when they did) was opened in February 2009, but withdrawn in March 2009.

== Court ==
On 11 December 2009, a court in Ingushetia found Ibragim Yevloyev guilty of unintentionally murdering Magomed Yevloyev. Ibragim Yevloyev was sentenced to two years of a "colony-settlement". In February 2010 his sentence was mitigated to two years of freedom restriction.

Relatives of Magomed Yevloyev do not trust the official version. In their view, the owner of Ingushetiya.Ru was murdered intentionally. The family addressed the European Court on Human Rights with a complaint.
