= Anzorey =

Anzorey Анзорей
- Selo

Other transcription(s)
  - Kabardian: Андзорей
- Interactive map of Anzorey
- Location of Anzorey Anzorey (Kabardino-Balkaria)
- Coordinates: 43°21′20″N 43°56′36″E
- Country: Russia
- Federal subject: Kabardino-Balkaria
- Administrative district: Leskensky District
- SettlementSelsoviet: Anzorey Settlement
- Founded: 16th century (Julian)
- Elevation: 445 m (1,460 ft)

Population (2010 Census)
  - Total: 6,551
  - Estimate (2025): 7,972 (+21.7%)

Administrative status
  - Capital of: Leskensky District, Anzorey Settlement

Municipal status
  - Municipal district: Leskensky Municipal District
  - Rural settlement: Anzorey Rural Settlement
  - Capital of: Leskensky Municipal District, Anzorey Rural Settlement
- Time zone: UTC+3 (MSK)
- Postal code: 361350
- OKTMO ID: 83618403101

Anzorey (Russian: Анзорей, Kabardian: Андзорей, romanized: Andzorey) is a rural locality (a selo) and the administrative center of Leskensky District of the Kabardino-Balkar Republic, Russia. Population: 6,551 (2010 census); 6,931 (2002 census);
