= Zalukokoazhe =

Rural locality in Kabardino-Balkaria, Russia

Zalukokoazhe Залукокоаже

Other transcription(s)
  - Kabardian: Дзэлыкъуэ къуажэ
- Interactive map of Zalukokoazhe
- Location within Kabardino-Balkaria Location within European Russia Location within Russia
- Coordinates: 43°53′53″N 43°13′13″E
- Country: Russia
- Federal subject: Kabardino-Balkaria
- Founded: 1904
- Elevation: 612 m (2,008 ft)

Population
  - Estimate (2025): 9,928 )
- Time zone: UTC+3 (MSK)
- Postal code: 361700
- OKTMO ID: 83615151101

Zalukokoazhe (Russian: Залукокоаже, Kabardian: Дзэлыкъуэ къуажэ) is a rural locality (a settlement) and the administrative center of Zolsky District of the Kabardino-Balkar Republic, Russia. Population: 9,859 (2010 census); 9,276 (2002 census); 6,110 (1989 Soviet census).
