= Leskensky District =

Leskensky District Лескенский район (Russian)
- District

Other transcription(s)
  - Kabardian: Лэскэн къедзыгъуэ
  - Karachay-Balkar: Лескен район
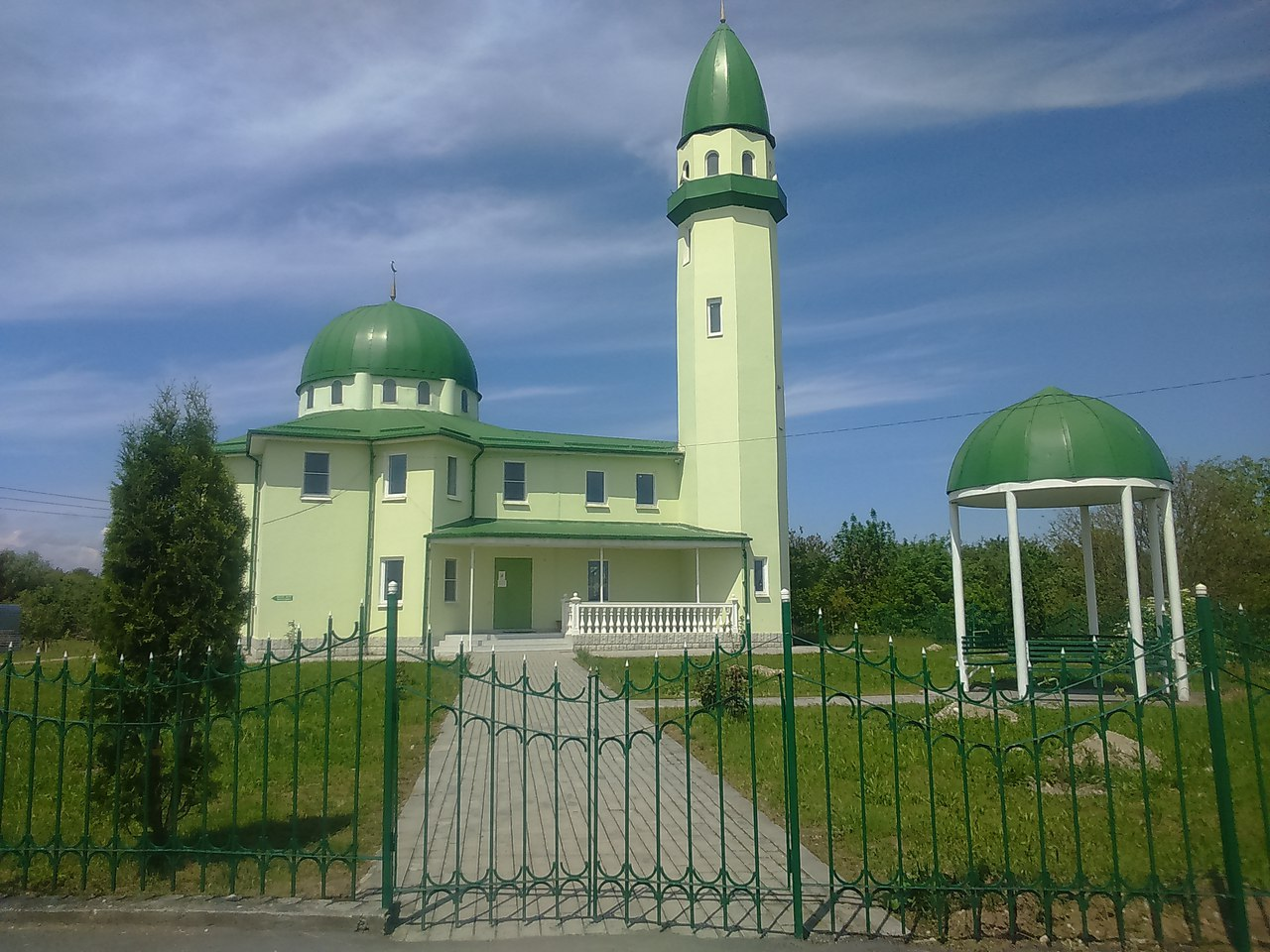
- Central Mosque, Argudana, Lesensky District

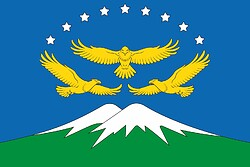
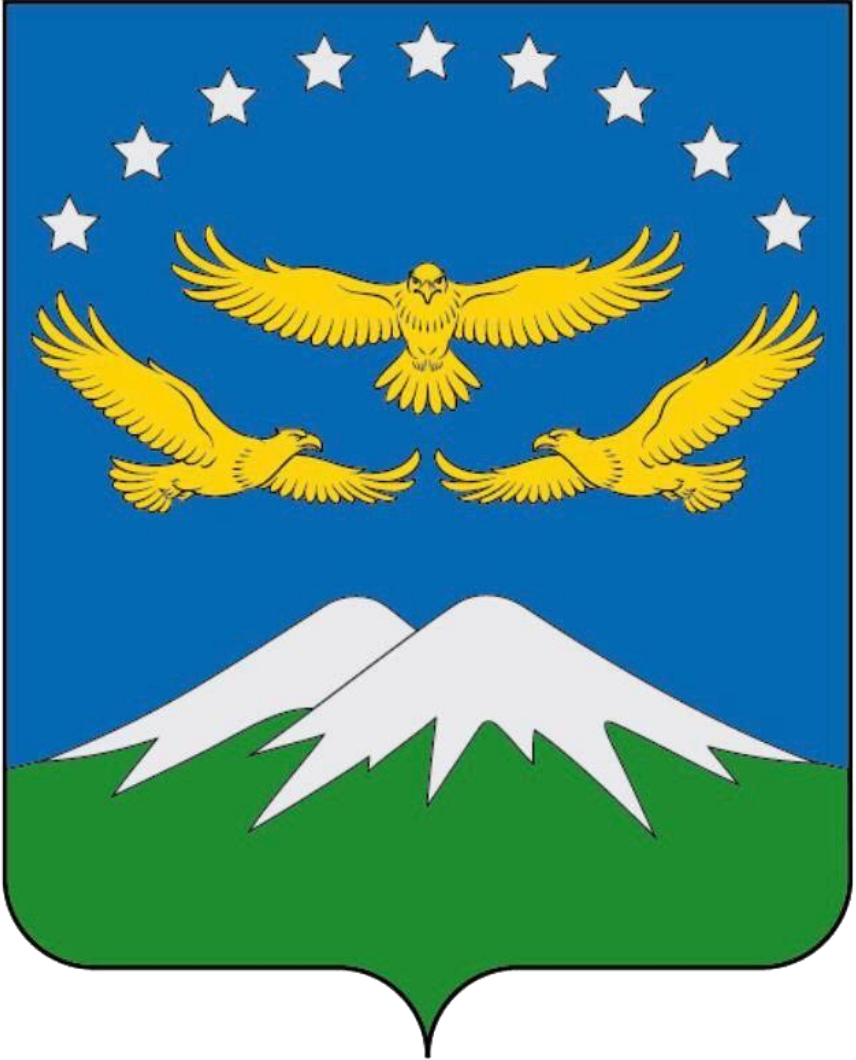
- Flag Coat of arms
- Location of Leskensky District in the Kabardino-Balkar Republic
- Coordinates: 43°21′N 43°56′E
- Country: Russia
- Federal subject: Kabardino-Balkar Republic
- Established: 2003
- Administrative center: Anzorey

Area
  - Total: 523.06 km^{2} (201.95 sq mi)

Population (2010 Census)
  - Total: 27,840
  - Density: 53.23/km^{2} (137.9/sq mi)
  - Urban: 0%
  - Rural: 100%

Administrative structure
  - Inhabited localities: 9 rural localities

Municipal structure
  - Municipally incorporated as: Leskensky Municipal District
  - Municipal divisions: 0 urban settlements, 9 rural settlements
- Time zone: UTC+3 (MSK)
- OKTMO ID: 83618000

Leskensky District (Russian: Лескенский райо́н; Kabardian: Лэскэн къедзыгъуэ; Iron Ossetic: Лескени уойлат; Karachay-Balkar: Лескен район, romanized: Lesken rayon) is an administrative and a municipal district (raion), one of the ten in the Kabardino-Balkar Republic, Russia. It is located in the southeast of the republic. The area of the district is 523.06 square kilometers (201.95 sq mi). Its administrative center is the rural locality (a selo) of Anzorey. As of the 2010 Census, the total population of the district was 27,840, with the population of Anzorey accounting for 23.5% of that number.

== History ==
The district was established in 2003.

== Administrative and municipal status ==
Within the framework of administrative divisions, Leskensky District is one of the ten in the Kabardino-Balkar Republic and has administrative jurisdiction over all of its nine rural localities. As a municipal division, the district is incorporated as Leskensky Municipal District. Its nine rural localities are incorporated into nine rural settlements within the municipal district. The selo of Anzorey serves as the administrative center of both the administrative and municipal district.
