= Prokhladnensky District =

Prokhladnensky District Прохладненский район (Russian)
- District

Other transcription(s)
  - Kabardian: Прохладнэ къедзыгъуэ
  - Karachay-Balkar: Прохладна район
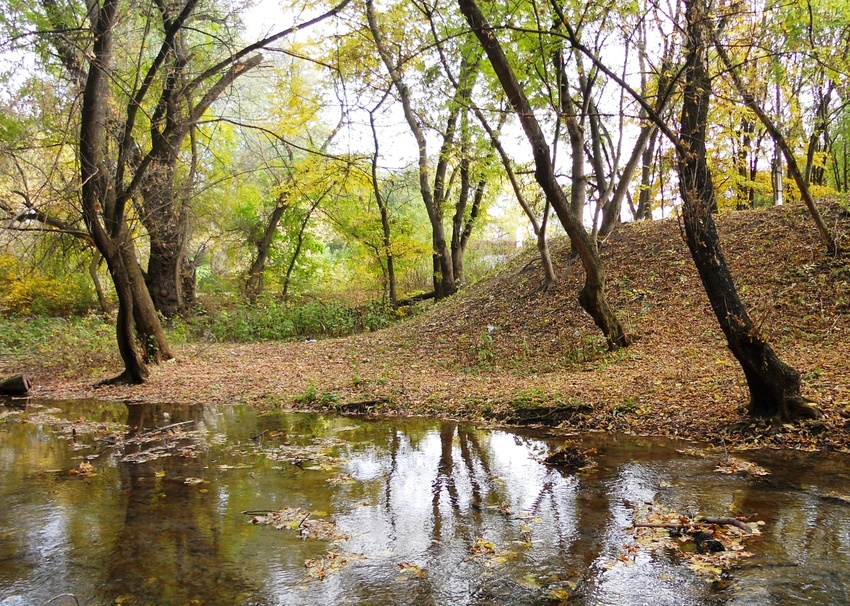
- The Shakoy Spring near Yantarnoye in Prokhladnensky District

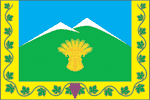
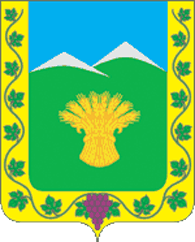
- Flag Coat of arms
- Location of Prokhladnensky District in the Kabardino-Balkar Republic
- Coordinates: 43°45′N 44°02′E
- Country: Russia
- Federal subject: Kabardino-Balkar Republic
- Established: 1937
- Administrative center: Prokhladny

Area
  - Total: 1,342 km^{2} (518 sq mi)

Population (2010 Census)
  - Total: 45,533
  - Density: 33.93/km^{2} (87.88/sq mi)
  - Urban: 0%
  - Rural: 100%

Administrative structure
  - Inhabited localities: 41 rural localities

Municipal structure
  - Municipally incorporated as: Prokhladnensky Municipal District
  - Municipal divisions: 0 urban settlements, 19 rural settlements
- Time zone: UTC+3 (MSK)
- OKTMO ID: 83625000
- Website: https://www.prohladnenskiy.ru

Population of Prokhladnensky District
- 2010 Census: 45,533
- 2002 Census: 46,425
- 1989 Census: 39,951
- 1979 Census: 38,174

Prokhladnensky District (Russian: Прохла́дненский райо́н; Kabardian: Прохладнэ къедзыгъуэ; Karachay-Balkar: Прохладна район) is an administrative and a municipal district (raion), one of the ten in the Kabardino-Balkar Republic, Russia. It is located in the northeast of the republic. The area of the district is 1,342 square kilometers (518 sq mi). Its administrative center is the town of Prokhladny (which is not administratively a part of the district). As of the 2010 Census, the total population of the district was 45,533.

== Administrative and municipal status ==
Within the framework of administrative divisions, Prokhladnensky District is one of the ten in the Kabardino-Balkar Republic and has administrative jurisdiction over all of its forty-one rural localities. The town of Prokhladny serves as its administrative center, despite being incorporated separately as a town of republic significance—an administrative unit with the status equal to that of the districts.

As a municipal division, the district is incorporated as Prokhladnensky Municipal District. Its forty-one rural localities are incorporated into nineteen rural settlements within the municipal district. The town of republic significance of Prokhladny is incorporated separately from the district as Prokhladny Urban Okrug, but serves as the administrative center of the municipal district as well.
