= Chegem =

Town in the Kabardino-Balkarian Republic, Russia

Chegem Чегем
- Town

Other transcription(s)
  - Kabardian: Шэджэм
  - Karachay-Balkar: Чегем
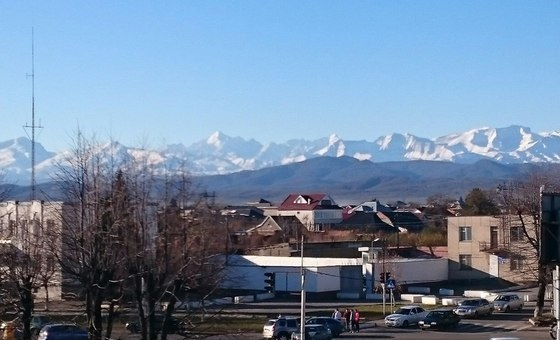
- View of mountains from Chegem
- Interactive map of Chegem
- Location of Chegem Chegem (Kabardino-Balkaria)
- Coordinates: 43°34′N 43°35′E
- Country: Russia
- Federal subject: Kabardino-Balkaria
- Administrative district: Chegemsky District
- Founded: 1822
- Town status since: 2000
- Elevation: 493 m (1,617 ft)

Population (2010 Census)
  - Total: 18,019
  - Estimate (2025): 21,161 (+17.4%)

Administrative status
  - Capital of: Chegemsky District

Municipal status
  - Municipal district: Chegemsky Municipal District
  - Urban settlement: Chegem Urban Settlement
  - Capital of: Chegemsky Municipal District, Chegem Urban Settlement
- Time zone: UTC+3 (MSK)
- Postal code: 361400–361403
- OKTMO ID: 83645101001

Chegem (Russian: Чеге́м; Kabardian: Шэджэм; Karachay-Balkar: Чегем, Çegem) is a town and the administrative center of Chegemsky District of the Kabardino-Balkarian Republic, Russia, located 10 kilometers (6.2 mi) north of Nalchik, at the elevation of about 470 meters (1,540 ft). Population: 18,019 (2010 census).

== History ==
Originally called Chegem Pervy (Чеге́м Пе́рвый), it was granted urban-type settlement status in 1972. In 2000, it was granted town status and renamed Chegem.

== Administrative and municipal status ==
Within the framework of administrative divisions, Chegem serves as the administrative center of Chegemsky District, to which it is directly subordinated. As a municipal division, the town of Chegem is incorporated within Chegemsky Municipal District as Chegem Urban Settlement.

== Demographics ==
Population: 18,019 (2010 census); 17,893 (2002 census); 13,225 (1989 Soviet census).

=== Ethnic composition ===
As of the 2002 Census, the ethnic distribution of the population was:

- Kabardins: 81.7%
- Balkars: 12.5%
- Russians: 3.4%
- Other ethnicities: 2.4%
