= Astrakhan Governorate =

1717–1928 unit of Russia

Coordinates: 46.3333°N 48.0167°E

Astrakhan Governorate Астраханская губерния (Russian)
- Governorate of the Russian Empire (1717–1917), Russian Republic (1917), and RSFSR (1917–1928)
- 1717–1928
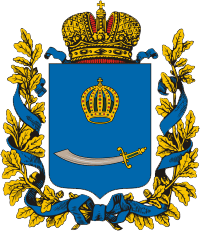
- Coat of arms

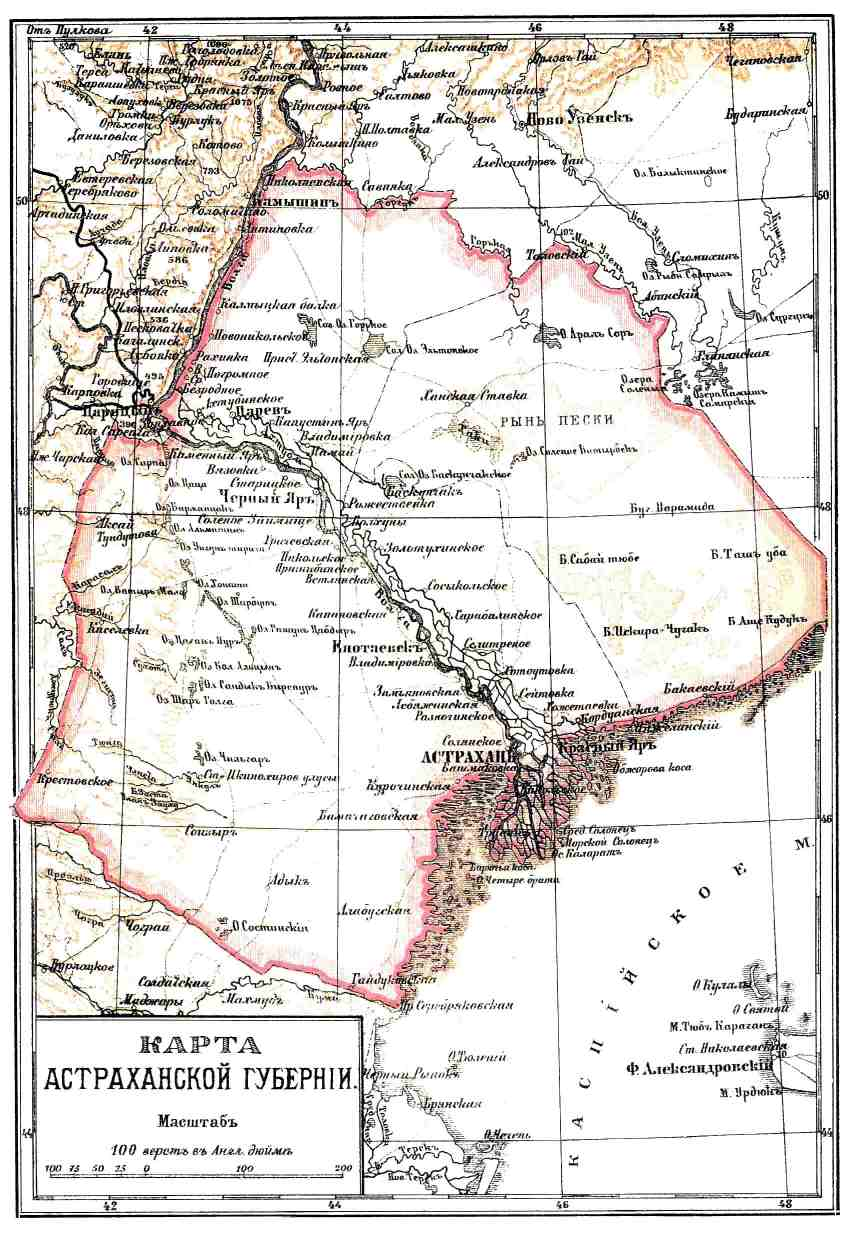
- Capital: Astrakhan
- Area
- 215,848.3 km^{2} (83,339.5 sq mi)
- Population
  - 1897: 1,003,542
- History
  - Proclaimed from Kazan Governorate: 3 December [O.S. 22 November] 1717
  - Bolshevik administrative reform: 21 May 1928
Preceded by	Succeeded by
Kazan Governorate	Lower Volga Krai

Astrakhan Governorate (Russian: Астраханская губерния, romanized: Astrakhanskaya guberniya) (Note: Pre-1917 orthography: Астраханская губернія) was an administrative-territorial unit (guberniya) of the Russian Empire, the Russian Republic, and the Russian SFSR, which existed from 1717 to 1929.

It was created from separating the southwestern part of Kazan Governorate by Peter I's reform in 1717 and abolished by the Bolshevik's administrative reform in 1928, where the governorate becoming part of Lower Volga Oblast (later Lower Volga Krai). The administrative center of the governorate was Astrakhan.

== Geography ==
=== Geographical position ===
The Astrakhan Governorate was located in the southeast of the European part of the Russian Empire, between 45° and 51° north latitude and 43° and 51° east longitude. The greatest length of the governorate from north to south is up to 550 versts (590 km), and the greatest width from west to east was 500 versts (530 km).

=== Location of the Governorate concerning modern administrative boundaries ===
On the territory of the former Astrakhan Governorate (within the borders of 1914), currently, the Astrakhan Oblast and the Republic of Kalmykia, are completely located, partly the Volgograd Oblast, the Stavropol Krai, the Rostov Oblast, and the Republic of Dagestan; part of the Governorate became part of Kazakh–Guryev Oblast.

The northeastern part of the former Astrakhansky uyezd is located on the territory of the modern Astrakhan Oblast; in addition, the southern part of the Republic of Kalmykia is located on the territory of the uyezd, a small western part of the uyezd is located on the territory of the Rostov Oblast, a small southern part of the uyezd is located on the territory of the Stavropol Krai, and the Republic of Dagestan.

The former Krasnoyarsky uyezd is mostly located in the territory of the modern Astrakhan Oblast; its small northern part is located in the territory of Kazakhstan; the northeastern part of the former Yenotayevsky uyezd is located in the territory of the modern Astrakhan Oblast, the southwestern part constitutes the northern part of the Republic of Kalmykia, and the extreme western part is on the territory of the Rostov Oblast. The northeastern part of the former Chernoyarsky uyezd is located on the territory of the modern Astrakhan Oblast; the northern and northwestern parts are on the territory of the Volgograd Oblast, and the southern part of the uyezd is now on the northern part of the Republic of Kalmykia.

The former Tsarevsky uyezd belongs to the modern Astrakhan Oblast in a small southern part, the rest of it with the city (now the selo) of Tsarev is located on the territory of the Volgograd Oblast, and the former Kyrgyz steppe is located on the territory of modern Kazakhstan.

=== Area ===
The area of the governorate in 1886, when according to the data of the governorate land surveying department, was 182,913 square versts (208,166 km^{2}) The area of all five uyezds, including the water surface, was 41,147 square versts (46,828 km^{2}), and the Kalmyk Steppe was 75,635 square versts (86,077 km^{2}) and the Inner Bukey Horde was 66,131 square versts (75,261 km^{2}).

According to other data (I. A. Strelbitsky; 1874), the area of the Astrakhan governorate was 197,247.2 square versts (224,479.6 km^{2}), including the surface of 647.5 square versts (736.9 km^{2}) lakes, the 14,674.8 square versts (16,700.8 km^{2}) of Volga Delta. This territory includes the area from the city of Tsaritsyn to the Caspian Sea, between the Volga, and Akhtuba rivers, and islands along the sea coast. In terms of area, the governorate occupied the fourth largest place among other governorates of the European part of the Russian Empire.

=== Relief ===
The territory of the governorate, as in our period, was vast, devoid of forest vegetation, sandy-clayed, and solonetsous steppe, which has a blanket-shaped slope to the southeast and is a part of the Caspian Depression, which was previously the seabed. The southern part of the governorate was washed by waters of the Caspian Sea for 400 square versts (460 km^{2}).

== Demographics ==
=== Language ===
- Population by mother tongue according to the Imperial census of 1897.

Language	Number	percentage (%)	males	females
Russian	409,306	40.8	206,251	203,055
"Kyrgyz-Kaisak" (Kazakh)	250,820	24.99	130,267	120,553
Kalmyk	138,572	13.8	72,081	66,491
Ukrainian	133,115	13.2	66,223	66,892
Tatar	52,799	5.26	28,418	24,381
German	5,162	0.51	2,521	2,641
Armenian	4,270	0.43	2,087	2,183
Jewish	2,214	0.22	1,167	1,047
Mordvinic	1,852	0.18	1,072	780
Turkmen	1,830	0.18	976	854
Other	3602	0.36	2390	1212
Total	1,003,542	100.0	513,453	490,089

== See also ==
- Astrakhan Oblast
