= Chegemsky District =

Chegemsky District Чегемский район (Russian)
- District

Other transcription(s)
  - Kabardian: Шэджэм къедзыгъуэ
  - Karachay-Balkar: Чегем район
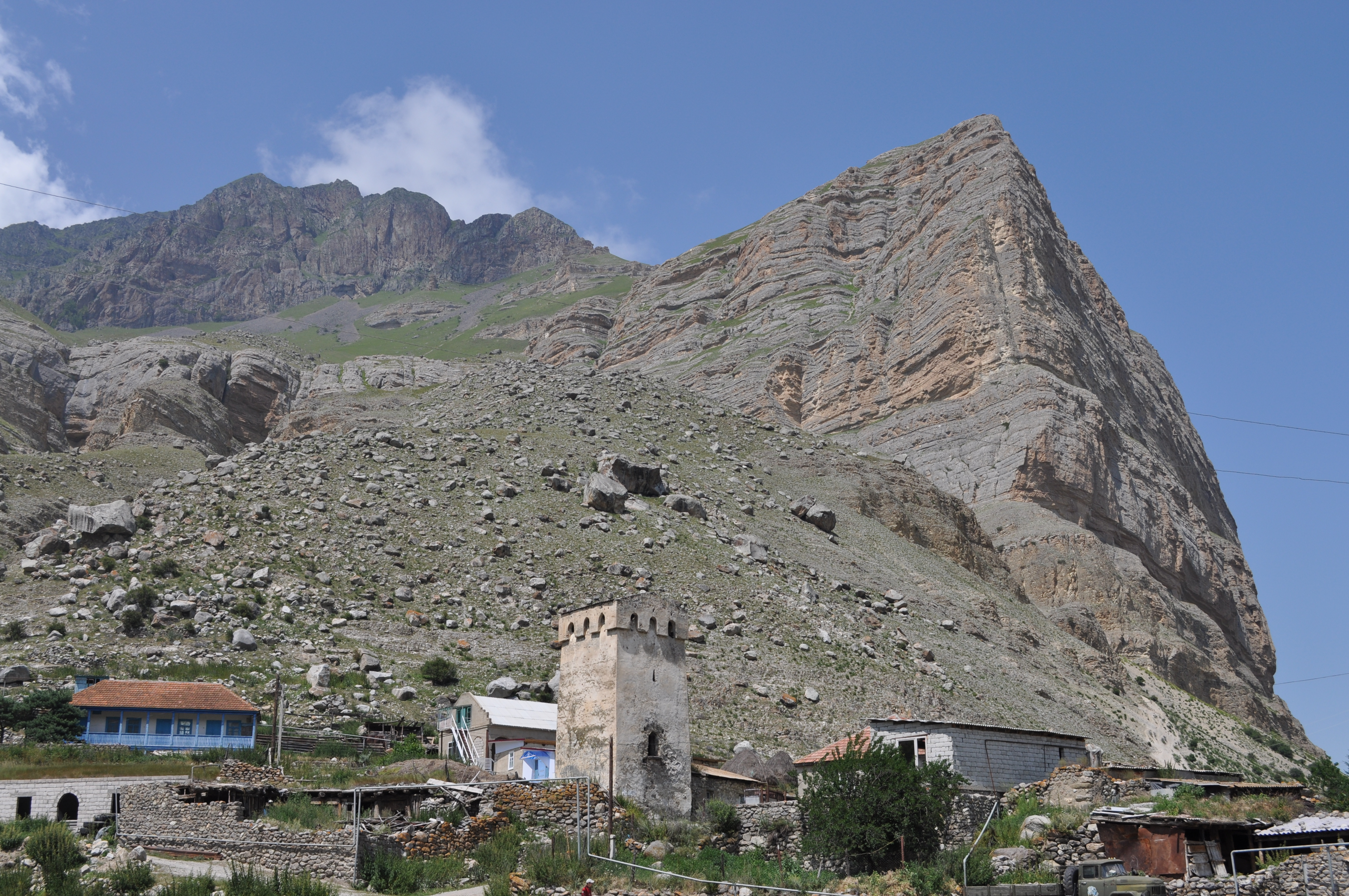
- The selo of Eltyubyu in Chegemsky District. The tower of the Balkarukovs, a cultural heritage object of Russia, is seen in the center.

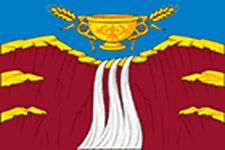
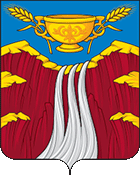
- Flag Coat of arms
- Location of Chegemsky District in the Kabardino-Balkarian Republic
- Coordinates: 43°34′N 43°35′E
- Country: Russia
- Federal subject: Kabardino-Balkarian Republic
- Established: 28 January 1935
- Administrative center: Chegem

Area
  - Total: 1,503.32 km^{2} (580.44 sq mi)

Population (2010 Census)
  - Total: 69,092
  - Density: 45.960/km^{2} (119.03/sq mi)
  - Urban: 26.1%
  - Rural: 73.9%

Administrative structure
  - Inhabited localities: 1 cities/towns, 12 rural localities

Municipal structure
  - Municipally incorporated as: Chegemsky Municipal District
  - Municipal divisions: 1 urban settlements, 9 rural settlements
- Time zone: UTC+3 (MSK)
- OKTMO ID: 83645000
- Website: http://www.cg.adm-kbr.ru

Population of Chegemsky District
- 2010 Census: 69,092
- 2002 Census: 68,335
- 1989 Census: 50,486
- 1979 Census: 43,315

Chegemsky District (Russian: Чеге́мский райо́н; Kabardian: Шэджэм къедзыгъуэ; Karachay-Balkar: Чегем район, Çegem rayon) is an administrative and a municipal district (raion), one of the ten in the Kabardino-Balkar Republic, Russia. It is located in the central and southwestern parts of the republic. The area of the district is 1,503.32 square kilometers (580.44 sq mi). Its administrative center is the town of Chegem. As of the 2010 Census, the total population of the district was 69,092, with the population of Chegem accounting for 26.1% of that number.

== Administrative and municipal status ==
Within the framework of administrative divisions, Chegemsky District is one of the ten in the Kabardino-Balkaianr Republic and has administrative jurisdiction over one town (Chegem) and twelve rural localities. As a municipal division, the district is incorporated as Chegemsky Municipal District. The town of Chegem is incorporated as an urban settlement and the twelve rural localities are incorporated into nine rural settlements within the municipal district. The town of Chegem serves as the administrative center of both the administrative and municipal district.
