= Nartkala =

Town in the Kabardino-Balkarian Republic, Russia

Nartkala Нарткала
- Town

Other transcription(s)
  - Kabardian: Нарткъалэ
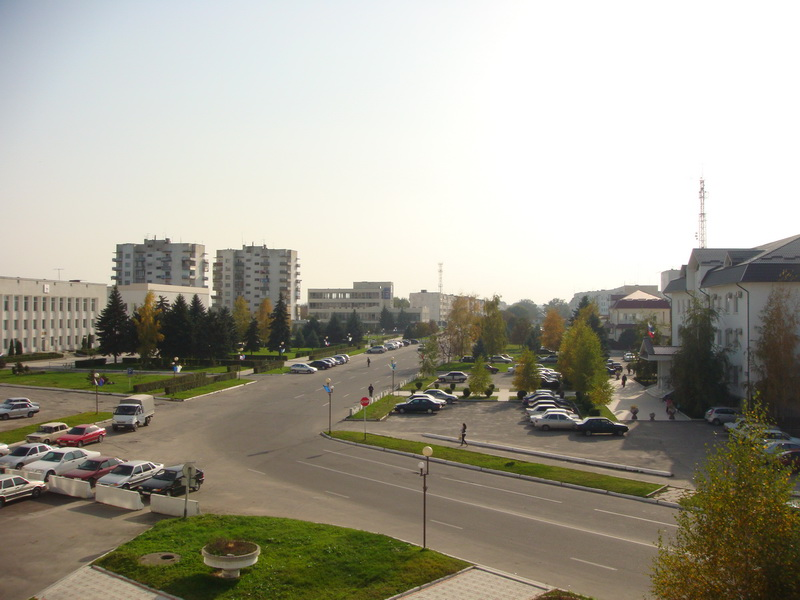
- Nartkala
- Interactive map of Nartkala
- Location of Nartkala Nartkala (Kabardino-Balkaria)
- Coordinates: 43°33′N 43°51′E
- Country: Russia
- Federal subject: Kabardino-Balkaria
- Administrative district: Urvansky District
- Founded: 1913
- Town status since: 1955
- Elevation: 305 m (1,001 ft)

Population (2010 Census)
  - Total: 31,694
  - Estimate (2025): 33,119 (+4.5%)

Administrative status
  - Capital of: Urvansky District

Municipal status
  - Municipal district: Urvansky Municipal District
  - Urban settlement: Nartkala Urban Settlement
  - Capital of: Urvansky Municipal District, Nartkala Urban Settlement
- Time zone: UTC+3 (MSK)
- Postal code: 361330
- OKTMO ID: 83640101001
- Website: www.ur.adm-kbr.ru/index.php/g-p-nartkala

Nartkala (Russian: Нарткала́, IPA: [nərtkɐˈɫa]; Kabardian: Нарткъалэ) is a town and the administrative center of Urvansky District of the Kabardino-Balkarian Republic, Russia, located 25 kilometers (16 mi) northeast of Nalchik. Population: 31,694 (2010 census).

== History ==
It was founded in 1913 as the railway station of Dokshukino (Russian: Докшу́кино, IPA: [dɐkˈʂukʲɪnə]); town status was granted to it in 1955. It was renamed Nartkala in 1967; the current name mean the city of the Narts (ancestors of various peoples of the Caucasus).

== Administrative and municipal status ==
Within the framework of administrative divisions, Nartkala serves as the administrative center of Urvansky District, to which it is directly subordinated. As a municipal division, the town of Nartkala is incorporated within Urvansky Municipal District as Nartkala Urban Settlement.

== Demographics ==
Population: 31,694 (2010 census); 33,775 (2002 census); 28,171 (1989 Soviet census).

=== Ethnic composition ===
As of the 2002 Census, the ethnic distribution of the population was:

- Kabardins: 55.4%
- Russians: 31.5%
- Turks: 3.2%
- Ossetians: 2.0%
- Ukrainians: 1.7%
- Koreans: 1.0%
- Other ethnicities: 5.2%
