= Zolsky District =

District in Russia

Zolsky District Зольский район (Russian)
- District

Other transcription(s)
  - Kabardian: Дзэлыкъуэ къедзыгъуэ
  - Karachay-Balkar: Зольск район
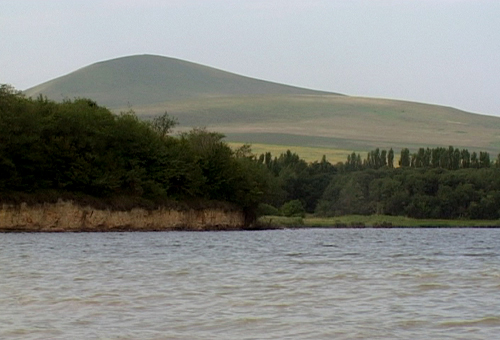
- Lake Tambukan is partially located in Zolsky District

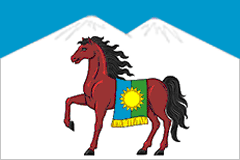
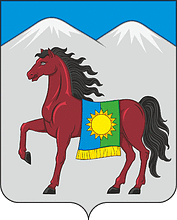
- Flag Coat of arms
- Location of Zolsky District in the Kabardino-Balkar Republic
- Coordinates: 43°54′N 43°13′E
- Country: Russia
- Federal subject: Kabardino-Balkar Republic
- Established: 1937
- Administrative center: Zalukokoazhe

Area
  - Total: 2,124 km^{2} (820 sq mi)

Population (2010 Census)
  - Total: 48,939
  - Density: 23.04/km^{2} (59.68/sq mi)
  - Urban: 20.1%
  - Rural: 79.9%

Administrative structure
  - Inhabited localities: 19 rural localities

Municipal structure
  - Municipally incorporated as: Zolsky Municipal District
  - Municipal divisions: 1 urban settlements, 15 rural settlements
- Time zone: UTC+3 (MSK)
- OKTMO ID: 83615000

Population of Zolsky District
- 2010 Census: 48,939
- 2002 Census: 50,634
- 1989 Census: 38,785
- 1979 Census: 36,571

Zolsky District (Russian: Зо́льский райо́н; Kabardian: Дзэлыкъуэ къедзыгъуэ; Karachay-Balkar: Зольск район) is an administrative and a municipal district (raion), one of the ten in the Kabardino-Balkar Republic, Russia. It is located in the western and northwestern parts of the republic. The area of the district is 2,124 square kilometers (820 sq mi). Its administrative center is the rural locality (a settlement) of Zalukokoazhe. As of the 2010 Census, the total population of the district was 48,939, with the population of Zalukokoazhe accounting for 20.1% of that number.

== Administrative and municipal status ==
Within the framework of administrative divisions, Zolsky District is one of the ten in the Kabardino-Balkar Republic and has administrative jurisdiction over all of its nineteen rural localities. As a municipal division, the district is incorporated as Zolsky Municipal District. Its rural localities are incorporated into fifteen rural settlements within the municipal district, except for the settlement of Zalukokoazhe, which is incorporated as Zalukokoazhe Urban Settlement. The settlement of Zalukokoazhe serves as the administrative center of both the administrative and municipal districts.
