= Kabardino-Balkaria constituency =

Russian legislative constituency

Kabardino-Balkaria single-member constituency
- Constituency of the Russian State Duma

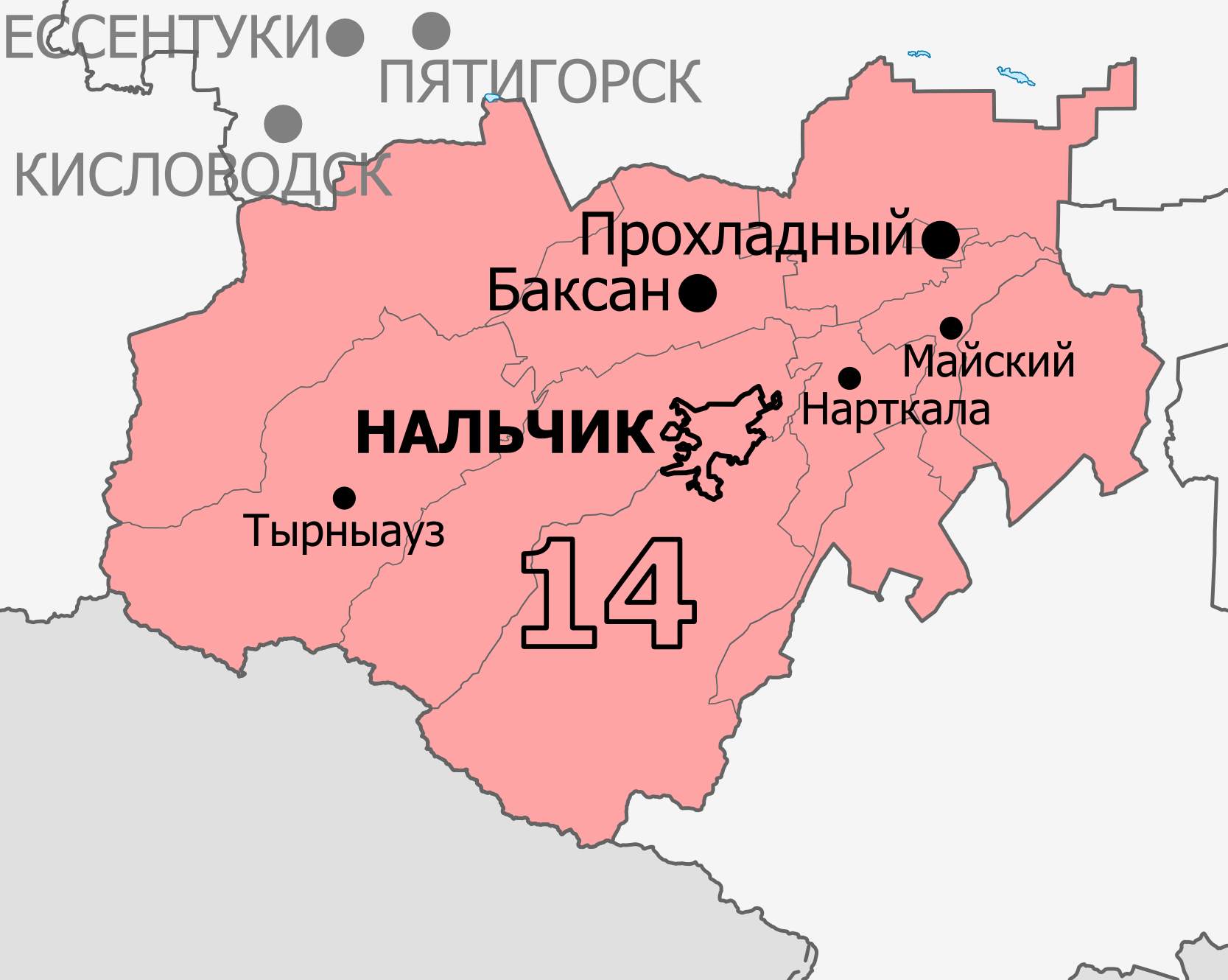
- Deputy: Adalbi Shkhagoshev; United Russia
- Federal subject: Kabardino-Balkarian Republic
- Districts: Baksan, Baksansky, Chegemsky, Chereksky, Elbrussky, Leskensky, Maysky, Nalchik, Prokhladnensky, Prokhladny, Tersky, Urvansky, Zolsky
- Voters: 552,964 (2026)

The Kabardino-Balkaria constituency (No.17 (Note: No.13 in 1993-2003, No.14 in 2016–2026)) is a Russian legislative constituency in Kabardino-Balkaria. The constituency encompasses the entire territory of Kabardino-Balkaria.

The constituency has been represented since 2016 by United Russia deputy Adalbi Shkhagoshev, a five-term State Duma member and retired militsiya officer.

== Boundaries ==
1993–2007, 2016–present: Baksan, Baksansky District, Chegemsky District, Chereksky District, Elbrussky District, Leskensky District, Maysky District, Nalchik, Prokhladnensky District, Prokhladny, Tersky District, Urvansky District, Zolsky District
The constituency has been covering the entirety of the Kabardino-Balkaria since its initial creation in 1993.

== Members elected ==
Election	Member	Party
1993	Khachim Karmokov (Note: resigned in April 1995 to retain his position as Chairman of the Accounts Chamber of Russia)	Independent
1995	Vladimir Sokhov	Our Home – Russia
1999	Vladimir Sokhov	Independent
2003	Zaurbi Nakhushev	United Russia
2007	Proportional representation - no election by constituency	
2011	Proportional representation - no election by constituency	
2016	Adalbi Shkhagoshev	United Russia
2021	Adalbi Shkhagoshev	United Russia
2026	Adalbi Shkhagoshev	United Russia

== Election results ==
=== 1993 ===
==== Declared candidates ====
- Feliks Aybazov (PRES), planning institute director
- Vladislav Bolov (Choice of Russia), meteorology centre director
- Pyotr Ivanov (Independent), Member of Supreme Council of Kabardino-Balkaria (1990–present), director of the Russian Academy of Sciences Kabardino-Balkarian Research Centre, 1991 presidential candidate
- Khachim Karmokov (Independent), Chairman of the Supreme Council of Kabardino-Balkaria (1991–present), 1991 presidential candidate
- Arsen Tatuyev (Civic Union), businessman
- Boris Tlyanchev (Independent), nonprofit chairman
- Allan Zhirikov (Independent), former Supreme Council of Russia staffer

==== Withdrawn candidates ====
- Mikhail Klevtsov (APR), Chairman of the Kabardino-Balkaria State Committee on Land Resources and Land Management
- Musa Shanibov (Independent), chairman of the Confederation of Mountain Peoples of the Caucasus (1989–present)

==== Results ====
Summary of the 12 December 1993 Russian legislative election in the Kabardino-Balkaria constituency
Candidate	Party	Votes	%
Khachim Karmokov	Independent	130,265	43.92%
Pyotr Ivanov	Independent	83,453	28.13%
Allan Zhirikov	Independent	16,526	5.57%
Vladislav Bolov	Choice of Russia	9,246	3.12%
Arsen Tatuyev	Civic Union	7,706	2.60%
Boris Tlyanchev	Independent	5,027	1.69%
Feliks Aybazov	Party of Russian Unity and Accord	2,893	0.98%
against all		17,538	5.91%
Total		296,623	100%

=== 1995 ===
==== Declared candidates ====
- Yury Bednev (Yabloko), Member of Parliament of the Kabardino-Balkarian Republic (1993–present)
- Aslanbi Buranov (Independent), surgeon
- Aleksandr Dirin (KRO), economist
- Magomet Magometkhanov (Independent), Security Council of Kabardino-Balkaria consultant
- Vladimir Sokhov (NDR), Deputy Prime Minister of Kabardino-Balkaria (1991–present)
- Timur Ulbashev (PRES), aide to State Duma member
- Azratali Zhemukhov (People's Union), union leader

==== Results ====
Summary of the 17 December 1995 Russian legislative election in the Kabardino-Balkaria constituency
Candidate	Party	Votes	%
Vladimir Sokhov	Our Home – Russia	183,605	53.38%
Magomet Magometkhanov	Independent	47,350	13.77%
Aleksandr Dirin	Congress of Russian Communities	29,396	8.55%
Timur Ulbashev	Party of Russian Unity and Accord	20,922	6.08%
Yury Bednev	Yabloko	20,702	6.02%
Aslanbi Buranov	Independent	9,784	2.84%
Azratali Zhemukhov	People's Union	9,198	2.67%
against all		16,267	4.73%
Total		343,988	100%

=== 1999 ===
==== Declared candidates ====
- Asker Karayev (DN), chairman of the party regional office
- Supyan Bek Sheripov (Nikolayev–Fyodorov Bloc), writer
- Vladimir Sokhov (Independent), incumbent Member of State Duma (1996–present)
- Ruslan Teuvazhukov (Independent), journalist

==== Withdrawn candidates ====
- Boris Gudov (CPRF), former Member of Parliament of the Kabardino-Balkarian Republic (1993–1997)

==== Failed to qualify ====
- Dzhabrail Kunashev (Independent)
- Sergey Tokhtabiyev (Independent), nonprofit president, 1996 presidential candidate
- Mukhamadia Tramov (Independent)
- Azratali Zhemukhov (Independent), union leader, 1995 candidate for this seat

==== Results ====
Summary of the 19 December 1999 Russian legislative election in the Kabardino-Balkaria constituency
Candidate	Party	Votes	%
Vladimir Sokhov (incumbent)	Independent	262,429	67.39%
Ruslan Teuvazhukov	Independent	81,333	20.89%
Asker Karayev	Spiritual Heritage	8,932	2.29%
Supyan Bek Sheripov	Andrey Nikolayev and Svyatoslav Fyodorov Bloc	5,493	1.41%
against all		20,157	5.18%
Total		389,427	100%

=== 2003 ===
==== Declared candidates ====
- Aliy Atabiyev (RPP-PSS), director of the Modern University for the Humanities, Nalchik branch
- Aslan Gayev (PVR-RPZh), businessman
- Khakim Kuchmezov (ORP Rus'), engineer
- Andrey Makarov (LDPR), businessman
- Zaurbi Nakhushev (United Russia), Chairman of the Parliament of the Kabardino-Balkarian Republic Council of the Republic (1993–present)
- Adalbi Shkhagoshev (Independent), former Member of Parliament of the Kabardino-Balkarian Republic (1993–2001), nonprofit president

==== Failed to qualify ====
- Sergey Tokhtabiyev (Independent), nonprofit president, 1996 presidential candidate, 1999 candidate for this seat

==== Did not file ====
- Andzor Dikinov (SPDR), Ministry of Property and Land Relations of Kabardino-Balkaria official
- Vladislav Tlenkopachev (NPPR), agriculture businessman

==== Declined ====
- Vladimir Sokhov (United Russia), incumbent Member of State Duma (1996–present) (ran on the party list)

==== Results ====
Summary of the 7 December 2003 Russian legislative election in the Kabardino-Balkaria constituency
Candidate	Party	Votes	%
Zaurbi Nakhushev	United Russia	268,872	70.31%
Adalbi Shkhagoshev	Independent	69,849	18.26%
Andrey Makarov	Liberal Democratic Party	10,368	2.71%
Aliy Atabiyev	Russian Pensioners' Party-Party of Social Justice	9,984	2.61%
Aslan Gayev	Party of Russia's Rebirth-Russian Party of Life	4,088	1.07%
Khakim Kuchmezov	United Russian Party Rus'	1,965	0.51%
against all		12,462	3.26%
Total		383,760	100%

=== 2016 ===
==== Declared candidates ====
- Boris Pashtov (CPRF), Member of Parliament of the Kabardino-Balkarian Republic (1997–2007, 2014–present)
- Kamal Shavayev (CPCR), first secretary of the party regional office
- Safarbiy Shkhagapsoyev (The Greens), Member of Parliament of the Kabardino-Balkarian Republic (2014–present)
- Adalbi Shkhagoshev (United Russia), Member of State Duma (2007–present), 2003 candidate for this seat
- Aishat Sultanova (Yabloko), rural activist
- Ruslan Tokov (A Just Russia), former Member of Parliament of the Kabardino-Balkarian Republic (2009–2014), instrumental businessman
- Musa Tsumayev (LDPR), Gazprom worker
- Khasan Zhilov (Rodina), unemployed

==== Failed to qualify ====
- Arsen Gyatov (Independent), sports club president
- Rodion Osmanov (Independent), IT workers' union leader
- Aslan Zhanokov (Independent), Ministry of Agriculture of Kabardino-Balkaria official

==== Declined ====
- Aslan Apazhev (United Russia), rector of Kabardino-Balkarian State Agrarian University (2014–present) (lost the primary)
- Zaur Gekkiyev (United Russia), Member of State Duma (2011–present) (lost the primary, ran on the party list)
- Murat Kardanov (United Russia), Member of Parliament of the Kabardino-Balkarian Republic (2014–present), 2000 Olympic Champion wrestler (lost the primary, ran on the party list)
- Khusein Kazharov (United Russia), Member of Parliament of the Kabardino-Balkarian Republic (2003–2009, 2014–present) (lost the primary)
- Irina Maryash (United Russia), Chairwoman of the Accounts Chamber of Kabardino-Balkaria (2014–present) (lost the primary, ran on the party list)

==== Results ====
Summary of the 18 September 2016 Russian legislative election in the Kabardino-Balkaria constituency
Candidate	Party	Votes	%
Adalbi Shkhagoshev	United Russia	241,626	50.13%
Boris Pashtov	Communist Party	90,628	18.80%
Ruslan Tokov	A Just Russia	76,431	15.86%
Safarbiy Shkhagapsoyev	The Greens	71,261	14.78%
Khasan Zhilov	Rodina	661	0.14%
Kamal Shavayev	Communists of Russia	526	0.11%
Musa Tsumayev	Liberal Democratic Party	496	0.10%
Aishat Sultanova	Yabloko	325	0.07%
Total		482,014	100%

=== 2021 ===
==== Declared candidates ====
- Irina Atamanova (Yabloko), physician
- Vladimir Bezgodko (LDPR), Member of Parliament of the Kabardino-Balkarian Republic (2019–present)
- Oleg Kuzminov (Rodina), nonprofit president, United Russia primary candidate
- Alisoltan Nastayev (SR–ZP), Member of Parliament of the Kabardino-Balkarian Republic (2014–present), construction businessman
- Boris Pashtov (CPRF), Member of Parliament of the Kabardino-Balkarian Republic (1997–2007, 2014–present), 2016 candidate for this seat
- Adalbi Shkhagoshev (United Russia), incumbent Member of State Duma (2007–present)

==== Declined ====
- Aslan Apazhev (United Russia), rector of Kabardino-Balkarian State Agrarian University (2014–present) (lost the primary)

==== Results ====
Summary of the 17-19 September 2021 Russian legislative election in the Kabardino-Balkaria constituency
Candidate	Party	Votes	%
Adalbi Shkhagoshev (incumbent)	United Russia	321,114	69.75%
Boris Pashtov	Communist Party	63,563	13.81%
Alisoltan Nastayev	A Just Russia — For Truth	51,450	11.18%
Vladimir Bezgodko	Liberal Democratic Party	16,682	3.62%
Oleg Kuzminov	Rodina	5,395	1.17%
Irina Atamanova	Yabloko	1,562	0.34%
Total		460,364	100%

=== 2026 ===
==== Declared candidates ====
- Zaur Babayev (New People), market owner
- Boris Pashtov (CPRF), Member of Parliament of the Kabardino-Balkarian Republic (1997–2007, 2014–present), 2016 and 2021 candidate for this seat
- Aminat Tappaskhanova (Yabloko), journalist
- Yelena Tumanova (LDPR), Member of Nalchik Council of Local Self-Government (2021–present), lawyer
- Adalbi Shkhagoshev (United Russia), incumbent Member of State Duma (2007–present)
- Aleksey Voytov (A Just Russia), Member of Parliament of the Kabardino-Balkarian Republic (2009–present), construction businessman

==== Declined ====
- Zaur Apshev (United Russia), Member of Parliament of the Kabardino-Balkarian Republic (2003–present) (lost the primary, running on the party list)

==== Results ====
Summary of the 18-20 September 2026 Russian legislative election in the Kabardino-Balkaria constituency
Candidate	Party	Votes	%
Adalbi Shkhagoshev (incumbent)	United Russia	321,731	68.77%
Boris Pashtov	Communist Party	73,734	15.76%
Aleksey Voytov	A Just Russia	39,514	8.45%
Yelena Tumanova	Liberal Democratic Party	17,632	3.77%
Zaur Babayev	New People	10,454	2.23%
Aminat Tappaskhanova	Yabloko	4,246	0.91%
Total		467,817	100%
