= Adyghe Hase =

Russian regional political party

Adyghe Hase Адыгэ Хасэ
- Founders: Abubachir Skhalyakho; Musa Shanibov; Zaurbiy Naloyev; Musa Psikhomakhov
- Founded: 1988 (Adygea, Kabardino-Balkaria); November 1989 (Karachay-Cherkessia)
- Ideology: Circassian nationalism; Anti-globalisation; Factions: Confederalism; Pan-Caucasianism; Environmentalism
- Regional affiliation: Confederation of Mountain Peoples of the Caucasus; Congress of Abazin and Circassian Peoples

Party flag

Adyghe Hase or Circassian Khase (Adyghe and Kabardian: Адыгэ Хасэ, romanized: Adəɣɛ Xasɛ, lit. 'Circassian council') is a political party active in the Russian republics of Adygea, Kabardino-Balkaria, and Karachay-Cherkessia, as well as in the former Shapsug national district in Krasnodar Krai. Popular among ethnic Circassians during the 1990s, it called for the unification of the three republics and the district into a single federal state.

== History ==
The divisions of Adyghe Hase were established in 1988 (Adygea, Kabardino-Balkaria) and November 1989 (Karachay-Cherkessia) by groups of Circassian nationalist activists and intellectuals in the Soviet Union. The party, like many anti-communist parties in the Soviet Union, comprised intellectuals who had minimal connections to the Soviet government or the Communist Party of the Soviet Union. The party's first leader in Karachay-Cherkessia was statistician Musa Psikhomakhov, while its deputy leader was philanthropist Albert Adamokov. In Adygea, its leader was philologist Abubachir Skhalyakho. In Kabardino-Balkaria, the group was led by Musa Shanibov, a professor who would also later lead the Confederation of Mountain Peoples of the Caucasus, and Zaurbiy Naloyev, a writer and ethnologist notable for disputing the Soviet government historiography of Circassian culture.

Adyghe Hase was primarily concerned with strengthening Circassian culture and the Circassian languages, and it sought to establish a single Circassian culture. One of the early issues for Adyghe Hase was the rehabilitation of the Karachays and Balkars, and the proposal by Karachay and Balkar intellectuals to establish a separate republic, based on the work of Turkologist Umar Aliyev stating that the two shared a language and cultural identity, prompted alarm in the party. In response to the proposal, Adyghe Hase declared its primary goal to be the "formation of the Federation of the Caucasian Adyghe people". Before October 1991, they opposed the separation of the Karachay-Cherkess Autonomous Oblast from Stavropol Krai to form a separate republic, and further disagreed with the establishment of separate Karachay and Circassian republics.

On 24 October 1991, Adyghe Hase joined the Congress of Abazin and Circassian Peoples, a political coalition including itself, the ethnically-Abazin Adgylara party, the ethnically-Nogai Birlik organisation, and several Cossack groups. The Congress unilaterally declared the establishment of a Circassian Republic within the Russian Soviet Federative Socialist Republic. By the summer of 1992, it would abandon efforts to establish a singular Circassian Republic.

=== Adygea branch ===
Following the beginning of the War in Abkhazia in August 1992 the Adygea branch of Adyghe Hase organised demonstrations in solidarity with Abkhaz separatist forces. They formulated an agreement with the Confederation of Mountain Peoples of the Caucasus, by which they agreed to send Adyghe volunteers to Abkhazia as part of the Confederation's forces. This agreement received tacit support from Aslan Dzharimov, the President of Adygea at the time. The Adygea branch's leader from January 1992, Amir Abregov, was also a refugee from Abkhazia. Adyghe Hase lawmakers, organised as the "Committee of 40", also participated in the drafting of Adygea's declaration of sovereignty.

During the second International Circassian Association meeting, held in Maykop from 20 to 25 July 1993, Skhalyakho was elected as the association's First Vice-president. Throughout the 1990s, one of the main goals of Adyghe Hase was to restore the Shapsug national district, as well as to fight the belief that Circassia voluntarily joined Russia. The Adygea branch of Adyghe Hase left politics in the mid-1990s to focus on cultural matters.

=== Kabardino-Balkaria ===
The Kabardino-Balkaria branch, on the other hand, was more radical. Following the 1992 arrest of Shanibov, they organised a series of protests for Shanibov's release and against the signing of the Treaty of Federation. As a result of the protests, Shanibov was either released or allowed to escape from prison. The protests descended into a riot on 27 September, after Kabardino-Balkaria President Valery Kokov declared a state of emergency and sent security forces to forcibly remove those protesting. Continuing to protest following the crackdown, Adyghe Hase demanded Kokov's resignation and new elections.

A compromise was eventually reached, by which the government agreed to not prosecute those protesting if Adyghe Hase and their co-organisers, the Congress of the Kabardian People, ceased protesting. After the agreement was reached, several leading members of the Congress of the Kabardian People were arrested and the organisation was forcibly dissolved. Adyghe Hase formed a group with several other Kabardian organisations, which sought to create a programme to establish a democratic society that had greater autonomy within Russia. The group announced it would no longer be organising protests in the spring of 1993, a move that dealt it a fatal blow: during the 1993 parliamentary elections in Kabardino-Balkaria, not a single candidate from Adyghe Hase won a seat.

Ideologically, the Kabardino-Balkaria branch was more favourable towards an independent, Pan-Caucasian state. At their February 1992 convention, they expressed support for the Chechen Republic of Ichkeria.

=== Karachay-Cherkessia ===
The Karachay-Cherkess branch of Adyghe Hase was primarily focused on obtaining greater privileges for Circassians in the republican government; along with the rest of the Congress of Abazin and Circassian Peoples, Adyghe Hase sought ethnic constituencies and the introduction of ethnic quotes in the Parliament of the Kabardino-Balkarian Republic, and strongly opposed the introduction of the Presidency. The party accused Vladimir Khubiyev of favouring ethnic Karachay in government appointments.

The Karachay-Cherkess branch was formally part of the Confederation of Mountain Peoples of the Caucasus but did not support an independent pan-Caucasian state. It was particularly focused on ecological and cultural protections. A group of the party's supporters unilaterally declared the existence of a Circassian Autonomous Oblast within Stavropol Krai in December 1994 and elected several members of the radical wing of Adyghe Hase to a self-declared executive committee. The event was condemned by the party's branch leadership, causing a conflict to emerge between the moderate and radical wings. On 11 February 1995, the conflict came to an end after the party's membership declared that Psikhomakhov, as well as other leaders of the organisation, were expelled. In response, Psikhomakhov and the other expelled leaders declared that those who had expelled them were acting illegally, and expelled them in return.

In 1999, Psikhomakhov served as chairman of the Republican Electoral Commission. After Vladimir Semyonov was elected president that year, Psikhomakhov refused to certify the results, leading to a skirmish with other members of the commission.

=== Since 2000 ===
In the 21st century, the party has largely refocused itself on cultural work, particularly in regard to the victims of the Circassian genocide. A memorial was installed in Adygeysk in 2004, and another in Ulyap on 21 May 2012.

The Shapsug branch of Adyghe Hase at first officially lent its support to the 2014 Winter Olympics, which caused controversy among members of the organisation. A group led by Ruslan Gvashev, a former museum worker from Sochi, sought the removal of branch chairman Madzhid Chachukh. After being selected as head of the branch's Council of Elders on 30 April 2011, Gvashev gave a speech at which he stated that he had attempted to contact the Russian government several times to improve the representation of Shapsugs and Circassian culture at the Olympics, and had gone ignored. Gvashev was later arrested in 2017 for an administrative violation after he participated in Shapsug traditional prayer services. As of October 2017, he remained in pre-trial detention, although he had suffered a stroke as a result of a hunger strike. Local human rights activists decried Gvashev's treatment as an effort to cause his death in prison.
