= Baksan =

Baksan may refer to:

- Baksan (town), in the Kabardino-Balkarian Republic, Russia
- Baksan Urban Okrug, a municipality which incorporates Baksan (town)
- Baksan (river), in the Kabardino-Balkarian Republic, Russia
- Baksan Neutrino Observatory

== See also ==
- Baksan (inhabited locality), a list of places bearing the name
- Baksan Hydroelectric Power Station, a power station on the Baksan River in the Kabardino-Balkarian Republic, Russia
- Baksansky (disambiguation)
