= Anatoly Bifov =

Russian politician (born 1963)

Anatoly Bifov MP
- Анатолий Бифов
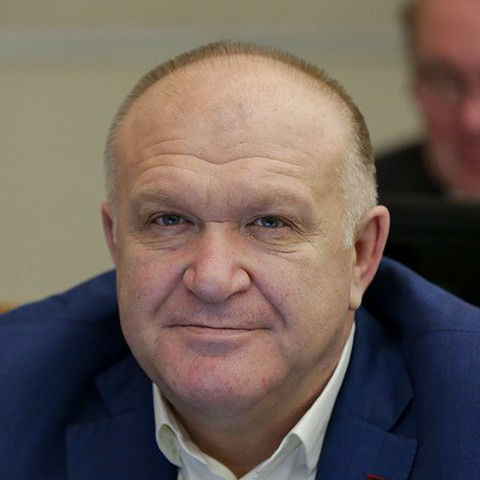

Member of the State Duma (Party List Seat)
- Incumbent
- Assumed office 21 December 2011

Personal details
- Born: 7 January 1963 (age 63) Baksan, Kabardino-Balkarian ASSR, RSFSR, USSR
- Party: Communist Party of the Russian Federation
- Education: Nalchik Municipal Construction College; North-Caucasus State Technical University (DPhil)

Anatoly Zhamalovich Bifov (Russian: Анатолий Жамалович Бифов; born 7 January 1963, in Baksan) is a Russian political figure and a deputy of the 6th, 7th, and 8th State Dumas.

== Biography ==
Bifov was born on January 7, 1963 in Baksan, Baksansky District of the Kabardino-Balkarian ASSR (now Kabardino-Balkarian Republic). Nationality - Kabardian. In 1982 he graduated from the Nalchik Municipal Construction College of the Ministry of Housing and Communal Services of the RSFSR, in 2000 North Caucasus State Technical University. He is a Candidate of Economic Sciences. He served in the Soviet Army.

== Career ==
From 1999 to 2003, he was the deputy of the Zolsky District Council. In 2001, he became the general director of the Sarmakovsky wine and vodka factory. From 2003 to 2008, he was the deputy of the Parliament of the Kabardino-Balkarian Republic of the 3rd convocation. From June 2008 to June 2011, he headed the Baksan administration. In 2009, he joined the Communist Party of the Russian Federation. In 2011, he became the deputy of the 6th State Duma. In 2016 and 2021, he became a member of the 7th and 8th State Dumas.

== Sanctions ==
He was sanctioned by the UK government in 2022 in relation to the Russo-Ukrainian War.
