= Musa Shanibov =

Circassian revolutionary (c. 1936–2020)

- Муса Шанибов

Tamada of the Confederation of Mountain Peoples of the Caucasus
- In office 25 August 1989 – 1996
- Preceded by: Position established
- Succeeded by: Yusup Soslambekov

Personal details
- Born: Yuri Mukhamedovich Shanibov c. 1936 Nalchik or Staraya Krepost, Kabardino-Balkarian ASSR, Russian SFSR, Soviet Union (now Kabardino-Balkaria, Russia)
- Died: 28 April 2020 (aged 83–85) Kabardino-Balkaria, Russia
- Party: CMPC
- Other political affiliations: Communist Party of the Soviet Union (until 1989); Adyghe Hase
- Education: Rostov State University (K. polit. N.
- Nickname: Garibaldi of the Caucasus

Military service
- Allegiance: Abkhazia
- Commands: Confederation of Mountain Peoples of the Caucasus
- Battles/wars: Georgian Civil War; War in Abkhazia (1992–1993)

Musa Magomedovich Shanibov (Russian: Муса Магомедович Шанибов; c. 1936 – 28 April 2020), born Yuri Mukhamedovich Shanibov (Russian: Юрий Мухамедович Шанибов) and also known simply as Musa Shanib, was a Circassian politician and revolutionary who led the Confederation of Mountain Peoples of the Caucasus from its founding until 1996. Popularly known as the "Garibaldi of the Caucasus", Shanibov led a largely-unsuccessful campaign for the region's nations to achieve independence from Russia and commanded volunteer troops in both the 1992–1993 War in Abkhazia. He was involved in the ethnic cleansing of Georgians in Abkhazia.

== Biography ==
Yuri Mukhamedovich Shanibov was officially born on 29 December 1936 in the town of Nalchik, the capital of the Kabardino-Balkarian Autonomous Soviet Socialist Republic, or the town of Staraya Krepost (now part of Baksan). However, his true birthdate could be as much as a year earlier, owing to poor record-keeping and the occupation of the region by Nazi Germany during World War II. His family was Circassian, from the tribe Kabardian tribe, and his father was killed after having been ousted as an anti-communist by his neighbour. A participant in the Sixtier movement, Shanibov graduated from Rostov State University as a Candidate of Political Sciences, and he became a professor at the Kabardino-Balkarian State University, additionally joining the Komsomol and Militsiya. As a supporter of democratic socialism, Shanibov's career prospects were stalled following Leonid Brezhnev's accession to the leadership of the Soviet Union, and a 1968 thesis on self-government brought additional unwanted attention. Prior to the dissolution of the Soviet Union Shanibov taught courses on sociology and Marxism–Leninism at Kabardino-Balkarian State University.

Amidst the dissolution of the Soviet Union, Shanibov initially styled himself after Andrei Sakharov and Mikhail Gorbachev with calls for democracy and a "common Caucasian home". On 25 August 1989 he was elected as president of the Confederation of Mountain Peoples of the Caucasus (CMPC) in Sukhumi, where a conflict between Abkhaz and Georgian nationalists was already beginning to become violent. The CMPC supported the Abkhaz drive for independence, and additionally provided backing to the 1991 Chechen Revolution. Concurrent with his taking on the CMPC's leadership, Shanibov changed his name from Yuri to Musa.

Within his native Kabardino-Balkaria, Shanibov was also developing a reputation as a leading politician of the pro-democratic opposition to the former communist leadership, which had begun to reconsolidate power in the region. Shanibov and the CMPC led efforts against incumbent President Valery Kokov, who was accused of violently cracking down on CMPC-backed dissent. Further, Shanibov was an opponent of Balkar efforts to achieve greater autonomy, calling for the separation of Kabardians and Balkars into two separate republics along a 1863 border agreement. The agreement would have halved the amount of territory controlled by ethnic Balkars.

Shanibov was arrested in September 1992 on charges of causing political unrest as Kabardians and Balkars continued to clash. Shortly afterwards, however, he escaped prison amidst violent protests by his supporters (though Fiona Hill argued this escape was engineered by the Kabardino-Balkarian government to deescalate tensions). His escape earned him widespread popularity in the Caucasus, and he came to be widely described as "Garibaldi of the Caucasus".

With the beginning of the War in Abkhazia Shanibov's CMPC expressed overt support for Abkhaz independence efforts and began militarising itself in an effort to fight Georgia. Shanibov commanded CMPC troops during the war, with future Chechen militant leader Shamil Basayev serving directly under him. Shanibov would later bemoan Basayev's shift to radical Islamism, saying that the War in Abkhazia was a time "in those days when Shamil still took my orders." CMPC involvement was critical to Abkhazia successfully obtaining independence, and Shanibov was revered in Abkhazia for his military achievements.

At the same time, within Russia, Shanibov's achievements were also bearing fruit. The three ethnically-Circassian republics of Russia (Kabardino-Balkaria, Karachay-Cherkessia, and Adygea) all signed the Treaty of Federation, acquiring widespread autonomy. The rejection of the Treaty of Federation by the Chechen Republic of Ichkeria was viewed by the CMPC as a sign of political hubris, and Shanibov would later fail to support Chechnya militarily (despite publicly vowing to do so) after the beginning of the First Chechen War.

In 1996 Shanibov announced the suspension of the CMPC, citing the attempts of other groups to seek out the CMPC to settle conflicts. For the remainder of his life, Shanibov was relatively quiet, though he continued to give interviews and attended a 2017 ceremony celebrating foreign volunteers of the War in Abkhazia.

Shanibov died in Kabardino-Balkaria on 28 April 2020 due to complications from COVID-19. He was the second individual in the region to die from COVID-19.

== Controversies ==
=== Ethnic cleansing of Georgians ===
Musa Shanibov was involved in ethnic cleansing of Georgians in Abkhazia. In 1993, he delivered a speech in front of the North Caucasian volunteers, urging them to "kill, hack, cut off ears and noses of Georgians". Many of those actions were reported to be committed against Georgian civilians and they were classified as ethnic cleansing.
