= Adalbi Shkhagoshev =

Russian politician

- Адальби Шхагошев
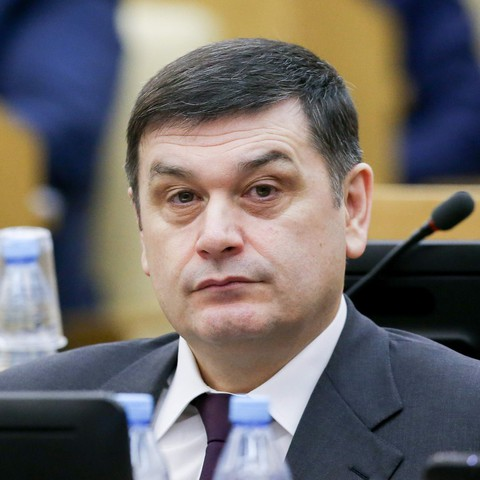
- Shkhagoshev in 2016

Member of the State Duma for Kabardino-Balkaria
- Incumbent
- Assumed office 5 October 2016
- Preceded by: constituency re-established
- Constituency: Kabardino-Balkaria-at-large (No. 14)

Member of the State Duma (Party List Seat)
- In office 24 December 2007 – 5 October 2016

Personal details
- Born: 6 June 1967 (age 59) Hatuey, Kabardino-Balkarian ASSR, Russian SFSR, Soviet Union
- Party: United Russia
- Education: Kabardino-Balkarian State University

Adalby Lyulevich Shkhagoshev (Russian: Адальби Люлевич Шхагошев; 6 June 1967) is a Russian political figure and deputy of the 5th, 6th, 7th, and 8th State Dumas.

In 1991, Shkhagoshev started working as a senior detective of the Department for Combating Organized Crime of the Ministry of Internal Affairs of Kabardino-Balkaria. On 1 October 1992 Shkhagoshev lost both hands during the operation to free a hostage. After the incident, he received the Order "For Personal Courage". From 1993 to 2001, Shkhagoshev served as deputy of the Parliament of the Kabardino-Balkarian Republic of the 1st and 2nd convocations. On 2 December 2007 he was elected deputy of the 5th State Duma. In 2011, 2016, and 2021, he was re-elected for the 6th, 7th, and 8th State Dumas.

== Sanctions ==
He was sanctioned by the UK government in 2022 in relation to the Russo-Ukrainian War.
