= Ilyas Bechelov =

Russian politician (born 1951)

- Ильяс Бечелов
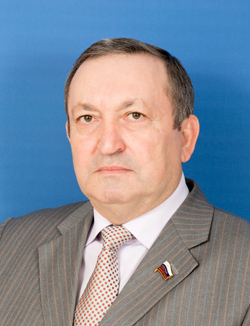

Senator from Kabardino-Balkaria
- In office December 2010 – October 2014
- Preceded by: Husein Chechenov
- Succeeded by: Arsen Kanokov

Personal details
- Born: Ilyas Bechelov; 5 March 1951 (age 75) Bayzak District, Jambyl Region, Kazakh SSR
- Party: United Russia
- Education: Kabardino-Balkarian State University

Ilyas Borisovich Bechelov (Russian: Ильяс Борисович Бечелов; born 5 March 1951) is a Russian politician who served as a senator from Kabardino-Balkaria from 2010 to 2014.

== Career ==
Ilyas Bechelov was born on 5 March 1951 in Bayzak District, Jambyl Region, Kazakh SSR. He graduated from the Kabardino-Balkarian State University. Later he worked as a deputy head of the Ministry of Internal Affairs of the Kabardino-Balkaria. From 2001 to 2003, he was the Minister of Labor and Social Development of Kabardino-Balkaria. From 2003 to 2009, Bechelov served as a chairman of the Parliament of the Kabardino-Balkarian Republic. From 2010 to 2014, he represented Kabardino-Balkaria in the Federation Council.

== Family ==
He's married. He has three children: a son and two daughters.

== Awards ==
December 4, 2006 - Order of Friendship

Order "For Merit to the Kabardino-Balkarian Republic" (13 May 2019) — for contributions to the establishment of statehood and significant input into the development of legislation and parliamentarianism.
