= Zaur Gekkiyev =

Russian politician (born 1961)

- Заур Геккиев
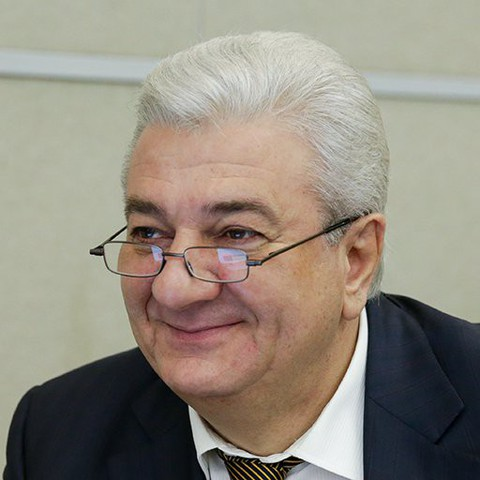

Deputy of the 8th State Duma
- Incumbent
- Assumed office 19 September 2021

Personal details
- Born: 12 February 1961 (age 65) Lashkuta, Baksansky District, Kabardino-Balkarian Autonomous Soviet Socialist Republic, USSR
- Party: United Russia
- Education: Kabardino-Balkarian State Agricultural University

Zaur Gekkiyev (Russian: Заур Далхатович Геккиев, born 12 February 1961 in Lashkuta, Soviet Union) is a Russian political figure and a deputy of the 6th, 7th and 8th State Dumas.

In 2002, Gekkiyev was granted a Candidate of Economic Sciences degree. In 2000 he was appointed the Deputy Head of Administration of Nalchik. In 2002–2003, he was a Minister of Resorts and Tourism of the Kabardino-Balkaria. He was a deputy of the Parliament of the Kabardino-Balkarian Republic of the 3rd and 4th convocations. In 2011 he was elected deputy of the 6th State Duma from the Kabardino-Balkaria constituency. Gekkiyev ran with the United Russia. In 2016 and 2021, he was re-elected for the 7th and 8th State Dumas respectively.

== Sanctions ==
He was sanctioned by the UK government in 2022 in relation to the Russo-Ukrainian War.

On 24 March 2022, the United States Treasury sanctioned him in response to the 2022 Russian invasion of Ukraine.
