= Anver Koneyev =

Russian footballer

Personal information
- Full name: Anver Abdulkhakovich Koneyev
- Date of birth: 6 October 1974 (age 52)
- Place of birth: Tyrnyauz, Kabardino-Balkarian ASSR, Soviet Union

Youth career
- –1990: Volna Magadan

Senior career*
Years	Team	Apps	(Gls)
1994	Chertanovo-2 Moscow (amateur)		
2002	Cucaracha Saint Petersburg (amateur)		
2003–2005	Mashinostroitel Saint Petersburg (amateur)		
2008	Smena-Zenit (amateur)		
2010	CF Smena-M-Insdustriya Saint Petersburg (amateur)		

Managerial career
- 1998–2001: DYuSSh Lokomotiv Saint Petersburg
- 2002–2013: DYuSSh Zenit Saint Petersburg
- 2013–2017: Zenit-2 Saint Petersburg (assistant)
- 2017–2018: Dynamo-M Saint Petersburg
- 2018: Zenit-2 Saint Petersburg (assistant)
- 2018–2021: Zenit Saint Petersburg (U-21 assistant)
- 2021–2022: Zvezda Saint Petersburg
- 2022: Akron Tolyatti (assistant)
- 2022–2023: SKA-Khabarovsk (assistant)
- 2023: Volgar Astrakhan
- 2023: Torpedo Moscow (assistant)
- 2023–2025: Baltika-2 Kaliningrad
- 2024–2025: Baltika Kaliningrad (assistant)
- * Club domestic league appearances and goals

Anver Abdulkhakovich Koneyev (Russian: Анвер Абдулхакович Конеев; born 6 October 1974) is a Russian coach and former player.

== Coaching career ==
On 1 July 2021, he was appointed head coach of Zvezda Saint Petersburg. On 16 June 2023, he was appointed head coach of Volgar Astrakhan. On 25 October 2023, he joined Torpedo Moscow, where he became an assistant coach.
