= 2024 Kabardino-Balkarian parliamentary election =

Regional election in Russia

- 8 September 2024

All 70 seats in the Parliament 36 seats needed for a majority
- Turnout: 73.73% ▲6.50 pp
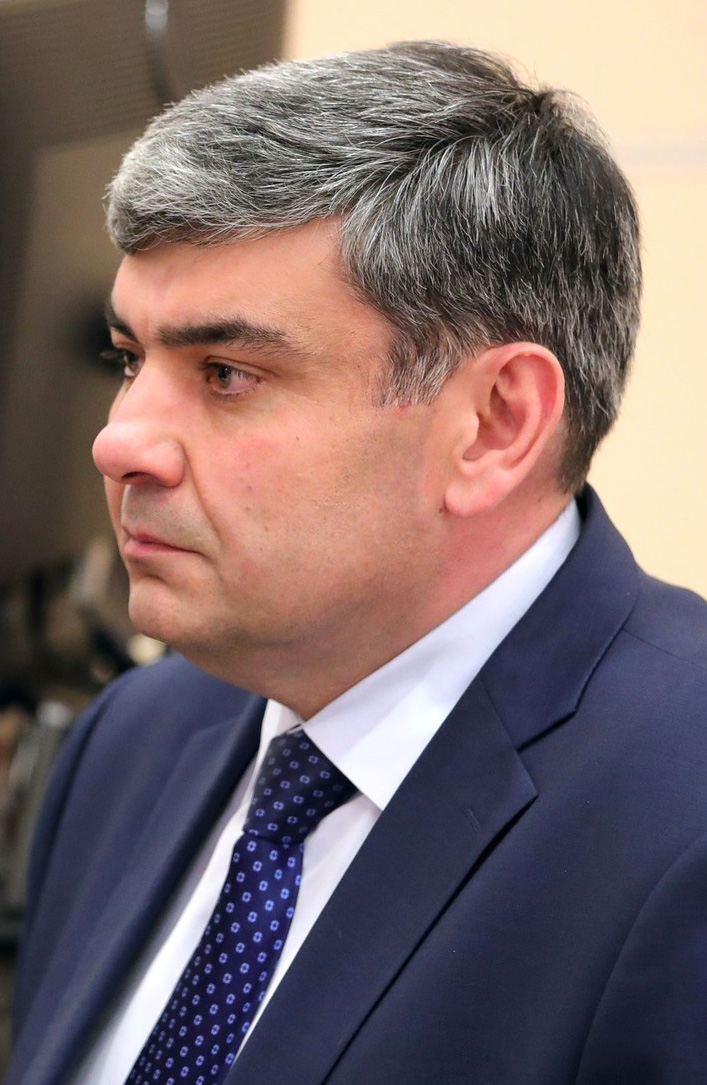

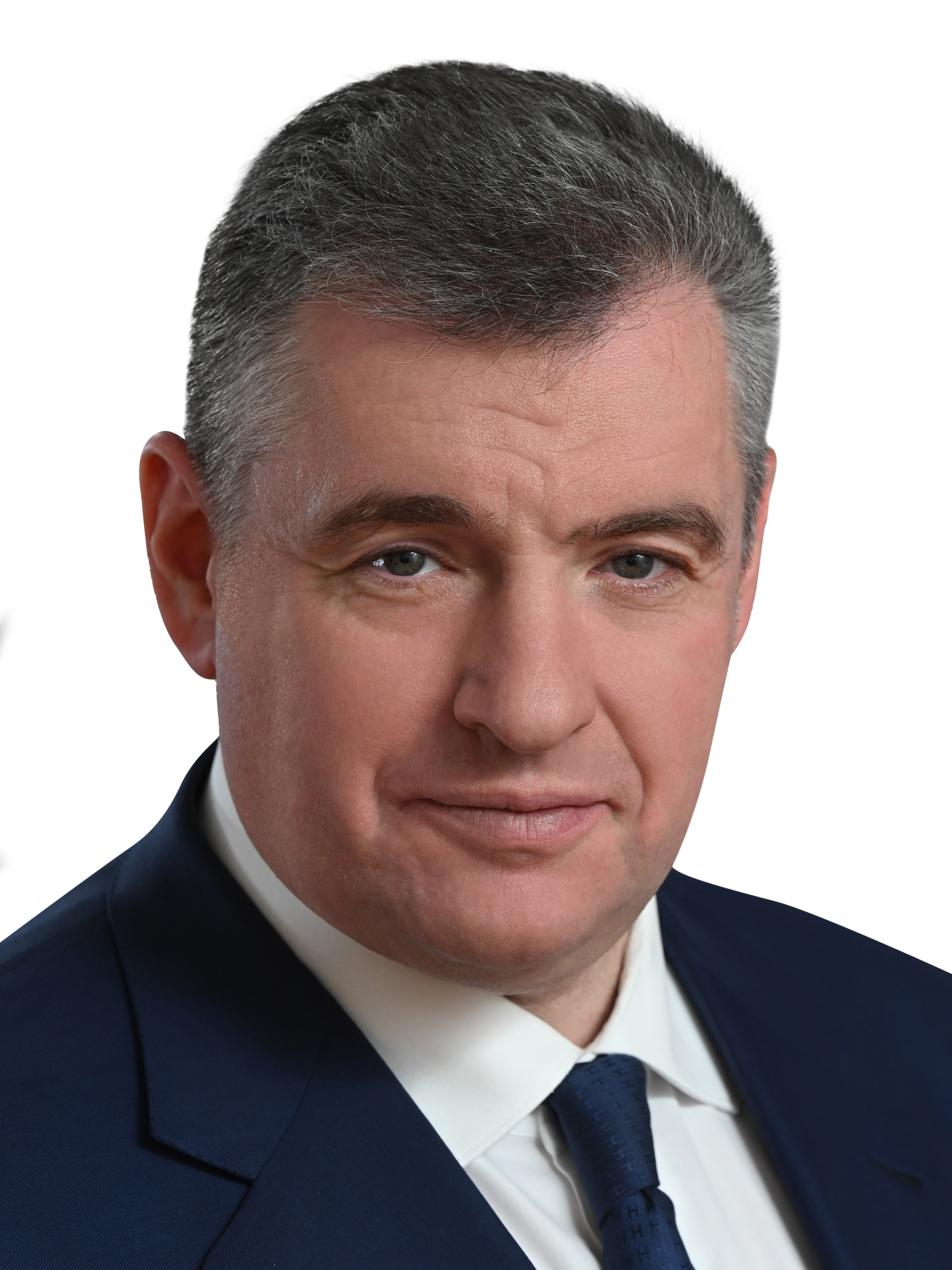
	Majority party	Minority party	Third party
		CPRF	SR-ZP
Candidate	Kazbek Kokov	Boris Pashtov	Vladimir Kebekov
Party	United Russia	CPRF	SR-ZP
Last election	65.85%, 50 seats	12.84%, 9 seats	10.35%, 7 seats
Seats won	50	9	7
Seat change	Steady	Steady	Steady
Popular vote	263,455	51,713	41,619
Percentage	65.71%	12.90%	10.38%
Swing	▼0.14 pp	▲0.06 pp	▲0.03 pp
	Fourth party	Fifth party	Sixth party
		Greens	NL
Candidate	Leonid Slutsky	Safarby Shkhagapsoyev	Zaur Babayev
Party	LDPR	The Greens	New People
Last election	5.10%, 2 seats	5.07%, 2 seats	Did not exist
Seats won	2	2	0
Seat change	Steady	Steady	Did not exist
Popular vote	20,351	20,295	3,026
Percentage	5.08%	5.06%	0.75%
Swing	▼0.02 pp	▼0.01 pp	Did not exist
Chairwoman before election
Tatyana Yegorova
United Russia
Elected Chairman
Tatyana Yegorova
United Russia

The 2024 Parliament of the Kabardino-Balkarian Republic election took place on 8 September 2024, on common election day. All 70 seats in the Parliament were up for reelection.

The composition of the Parliament was completely unchanged with United Russia retaining its overwhelming majority. All the parties crossing the threshold saw little to no change in the percentage of votes, compared to their 2019 results.

== Electoral system ==
Under current election laws, the Parliament is elected for a term of five years by party-list proportional representation with a 5% electoral threshold. Seats are allocated using the Imperiali quota, modified to ensure that every party list, which passes the threshold, receives at least 1 mandate. Unlike most regional elections in Russia, party lists in Kabardino-Balkaria are not divided between territorial groups.

== Candidates ==
To register regional lists of candidates, parties need to collect 0.5% of signatures of all registered voters in Kabardino-Balkaria.

The following parties were relieved from the necessity to collect signatures:

- United Russia
- Communist Party of the Russian Federation
- A Just Russia — Patriots — For Truth
- Liberal Democratic Party of Russia
- New People
- Russian Ecological Party "The Greens"

№	Party	Party-list leaders	Candidates	Status
1	New People	Zaur Babayev • Alina Soblirova • Raul Gayev • Zalim Kudayev • Stanislav Gavrilov	43	Registered
2	The Greens	Safarby Shkhagapsoyev • Aslan Altuyev • Yelena Krapivina • Khazhpago Kochesokov • Madina Shogenova	40	Registered
3	Communist Party	Boris Pashtov • Khasan Akkiyev • Aleksey Mironkin • Zaurbek Kumalov • Kasbolat Dzamikhov	68	Registered
4	United Russia	Kazbek Kokov • Temirzhan Baysiyev • Mikhail Afashagov • Tatyana Yegorova • Akhmed Yesenkulov	118	Registered
5	Liberal Democratic Party	Leonid Slutsky • Vladimir Bezgodko • Timur Berov • Beslan Bifov • Yelena Tumanova	47	Registered
6	A Just Russia – For Truth	Vladimir Kebekov • Aleksey Voytov • Zaur Sekrekov • Alisoltan Nastayev • Azret Erkenov	41	Registered

New People took part in Kabardino-Balkarian legislative election for the first time, while Civic Platform, who participated in the last election, did not file.

== Results ==
Summary of the 8 September 2024 Parliament of the Kabardino-Balkarian Republic election results
Party	Votes	%	±pp	Seats	+/–
United Russia	263,455	65.71	▼0.14	50	Steady
Communist Party	51,713	12.90	▲0.06	9	Steady
A Just Russia — For Truth	41,619	10.38	▲0.03	7	Steady
Liberal Democratic Party	20,351	5.08	▼0.02	2	Steady
The Greens	20,295	5.06	▼0.01	2	Steady
New People	3,026	0.75	New	0	New
Invalid ballots	502	0.13	▼0.05	—	—
Total	400,961	100.00	—	70	Steady
Turnout	400,961	73.73	▲6.50	—	—
Registered voters	543,811	100.00	—	—	—

Tatyana Yegorova (United Russia) was re-elected as Chairwoman of the Parliament, while incumbent Senator Mukharby Ulbashev (United Russia) was re-appointed to the Federation Council.

=== Members ===
Incumbent deputies are highlighted with bold, elected members who declined to take a seat are marked with ~~strikethrough~~.

Party lists
Member	Party
~~Kazbek Kokov~~	United Russia
Temirzhan Baysiyev	United Russia
Mikhail Afashagov	United Russia
Tatyana Yegorova	United Russia
Akhmed Yesenkulov	United Russia
Murat Kardanov	United Russia
Anatoly Rakhayev	United Russia
Marina Khashpakova	United Russia
Khusein Erkenov	United Russia
Ruslan Mazloyev	United Russia
Dmitry Parafilov	United Russia
Akhmed Tleuzhev	United Russia
Khuseyn Kazharov	United Russia
Valery Azhiyev	United Russia
Raneta Bzhakhova	United Russia
Yelena Kansayeva	United Russia
Oleg Martsul	United Russia
Amyrby Tekuyev	United Russia
Aslan Shipshev	United Russia
Fatimat Amshokova	United Russia
German Shevchuk	United Russia
Ruslan Gyatov	United Russia
Salim Zhanatayev	United Russia
Boris Malbakhov	United Russia
Kurman Sottayev	United Russia
Mukharby Ulbashev	United Russia
Vitaly Tokar	United Russia
Vladislav Russ	United Russia
Islam Zikhov	United Russia
Zaur Apshev	United Russia
Muayed Dadov	United Russia
Zalim Kaysinov	United Russia
Mikhail Krivko	United Russia
Alikhan Mechukayev	United Russia
Artur Tekushev	United Russia
Amir Akhmetov	United Russia
Salikh Baydayev	United Russia
Zalim Baksanokov	United Russia
Nina Yemuzova	United Russia
Albert Kazdokhov	United Russia
Mikhail Prytkov	United Russia
Timur Tkhagalegov	United Russia
Zaurby Kharadurov	United Russia
Natalia Pentezidi	United Russia
Natalya Bespalova	United Russia
Eldar Zalikhanov	United Russia
Artur Beshtoyev	United Russia
Tatyana Kanunnikova	United Russia
Mukhamed Kudaliyev	United Russia
Radik Kardanov	United Russia
Olga Korotkikh	United Russia
Boris Pashtov	Communist Party
Khasan Akkiyev	Communist Party
Aleksey Mironkin	Communist Party
Zaurbek Kumalov	Communist Party
Kasbolat Dzamikhov	Communist Party
Dalkhat Baydayev	Communist Party
Vasily Shulga	Communist Party
Zalim Kochesokov	Communist Party
Astemir Ashabokov	Communist Party
Vladimir Kebekov	A Just Russia – For Truth
Aleksey Voytov	A Just Russia – For Truth
Zaur Sekrekov	A Just Russia – For Truth
Alisoltan Nastayev	A Just Russia – For Truth
Azret Erkenov	A Just Russia – For Truth
Marat Kalmykov	A Just Russia – For Truth
Murat Makoyev	A Just Russia – For Truth
~~Leonid Slutsky~~	Liberal Democratic Party
Vladimir Bezgodko	Liberal Democratic Party
Timur Berov	Liberal Democratic Party
Safarby Shkhagapsoyev	The Greens
Aslan Altuyev	The Greens

== See also ==
- 2024 Russian elections
