= Pan-Caucasianism =

Political ideology in the Caucasus

Geographic map of the Caucasus

Pan-Caucasianism is a political current supporting the cooperation and integration of some or all peoples of the Caucasus. Pan-Caucasianism has been hindered by the ethnic, religious and cultural diversity of the Caucasus, and frequent regional conflicts.

Historically, attempts to integrate various Caucasus states have proven to be short-lived. The Transcaucasian Democratic Federative Republic collapsed after Georgia quit because of irreconcilable foreign policy differences with the other parties. Subsequent attempts to integrate Georgia into a similar regional entity led to a major political crisis in the Soviet leadership since Georgian Bolsheviks considered this to be an attempt to limit their independence. In the 1990s, Georgian President Zviad Gamsakhurdia favored regional alliance between native peoples of the Caucasus; however, he was soon overthrown, so the "realisation of the idea of Caucasianness...has never gone beyond the declaratory level or imaginative projects..."

== Historical examples ==
The medieval Kingdom of Georgia has sometimes been described as a pan-Caucasian empire.

In the North Caucasus, pan-Caucasianism has been linked by Abkhaz politician and historian Stanislav Lakoba to the Caucasian Imamate and the Caucasian War. The Caucasian Imamate, led by Imam Shamil, notably united the disparate ethnic groups of the Northern Caucasus into a singular political formation, which was used to wage a twenty-year guerrilla war against the Russian Empire.

Scholar Yuri Anchabadze traced the first record of the pan-Caucasian identity to the medieval Georgian historian Leonti Mroveli, who claimed that all peoples of the Caucasus originate from one ethnarch. The linguistic theory of Ibero-Caucasian languages also contributed to the belief in common origins.

== 20th century ==
=== Russian Civil War and USSR ===
Niko Nikoladze envisaged the creation of a free, decentralized, and self-governing federation of the Caucasian peoples based on the principle of ethnically proportional representation.

The idea of Caucasian federation within the reformed Russian state was voiced by the some ideologues of Georgian social democracy.

During the dissolution of the Russian Empire and the Russian Civil War, multiple pan-Caucasian states briefly came into existence, though such states did not coexist for any longer than a few years. The most notable pan-Caucasian projects during the Civil War were the Transcaucasian Democratic Federative Republic and the Mountainous Republic of the Northern Caucasus.

==== Transcaucasian Democratic Federative Republic ====
The Transcaucasian Democratic Federative Republic was established on 22 April 1918 to effectively respond to the Ottoman invasion of the South Caucasus amid the collapse of the Russian empire. With the February and October Revolutions and the subsequent collapse of the central Russian authority in the Caucasus, the region was left in limbo; the Transcaucasian Commissariat was formed by representatives of Georgia, Azerbaijan and Armenia as a provisional self-government. However, it did not declare independence, waiting for resolution of situation in Russia. Nevertheless, during the Trebizond Peace Conference between the Ottoman Empire and the Transcaucasian Commissariat, the Ottoman diplomats presented an ultimatum to representatives of Commissariat, saying that they would recognize the authority of the Commissariat only if the Transcaucasia declared independence as a sovereign state under international law. Since the Ottoman forces continued their advance into the Transcaucasian territory, the Commissariat had little option but to declare sovereignty.

On 28 May 1918, Transcaucasian Democratic Federative Republic was dissolved after Georgia declared independence due to irreconcilable foreign policy orientations with other Caucasus states. This was soon followed by Armeno-Georgian War. Within the modern states of Armenia, Azerbaijan, and Georgia, the TDFR is largely ignored in their respective national historiography, given consideration only as the first stage towards their own independent states. However, Lakoba and Alessandra Russo, a researcher at Institut d'études politiques de Bordeaux, have both cited the TDFR as a failed attempt at pan-Caucasian cooperation, contrasting it with the Mountainous Republic of the Northern Caucasus and Transcaucasian Socialist Federative Soviet Republic, respectively.

On 10 June 1921, the Armenian, Azerbaijani, Georgian, and Dagestani governments in exile signed an economic and defensive union in Paris, concluding negotiations that had begun in the Caucasus and continued in France. The agreement provided for a customs union, freedom of transit, and non-recognition of the Soviet regime.

==== Mountainous Republic of the Northern Caucasus ====
Flag of the Mountainous Republic of the Northern Caucasus

After the February Revolution in Russia, the Union of the Peoples of the Northern Caucasus was established in March 1917 and an Executive Committee was elected to oversee its operations. It originated from the consolidation of various ethnic groups in North Caucasus, including the Circassians, Chechens, Karachays, Ossetians, Balkars, Ingush, and Dagestanis. In August 1917, the Central Committee decided to readopt the 1847 constitution of Imam Shamil. The independent Mountainous Republic of the Northern Caucasus (MRNC) was declared on 11 May 1918. Both White and Red Armies of Russia claimed the territory, with the Bolshevik government issuing a diplomatic note declaring their non-recognition of the MRNC in May 1918. With the support of the Ottoman Empire, the MRNC managed to repel Anton Denikin's Volunteer Army. However, in January 1921, the Red Army occupied the Mountain Republic and established the Soviet Mountain Republic (MASSR) as an autonomous republic within the Russian Soviet Federative Socialist Republic (RSFSR). The MASSR lasted only until 1924.

In 1984, the United States Congress passed a resolution marking the 66th anniversary of the declaration of independence of the Mountainous Republic of the Northern Caucasus.

==== Transcaucasian SFSR within USSR ====
Flag of the Transcaucasian SFSR

After the Russian Civil War, the South Caucasus was integrated into the Soviet Union and the Transcaucasian federation was recreated as the Transcaucasian Socialist Federative Soviet Republic (TSFSR). The TSFSR was one of the four republics to sign the Treaty on the Creation of the USSR establishing the Soviet Union in 1922. The federative republic existed from 1922 to 1936 and consisted of three Soviet Socialist Republics: the Georgian SSR, Azerbaijani SSR and Armenian SSR. The Abkhazian SSR also held a status of treaty republic within the Georgian SSR from 1921 to 1931. Georgian Bolsheviks notably resisted the creation of the TSFSR and wanted the Georgian SSR to have a full-member status within the Soviet Union. This led to Georgian affair, which resulted in the defeat of local Georgian Bolshevik leaders. They were accused of being "national deviationists" and repressed during the Great Purge.

=== World War II ===
The idea of united North Caucasus continued to exist in émigré communities. Sultan Klych-Girey led pan-Caucasian anti-communist groups in exile, and during World War II various pan-Caucasian forces (including Klych-Girey) fought on the side of Germany.

Also during the World War II, the pan-Caucasianism was promoted by the Georgian emigres in Germany, who exerted a substantial influence. Alexander Nikuradse, a Georgian adviser to Alfred Rosenberg, argued for a German-aligned and Georgian-led independent Caucasian confederation, based on the Karl Haushofer's theories of "large spaces". According to Nikuradse, Georgia had the same role to the Caucasus that Germany had to Europe: geographically centrally located, racially the purest, politically the most endowed with a mission of leadership. Rosenberg accepted this concept. He envisioned Georgia to be the core and a leader of the Caucasian confederation, with Tiflis as its capital and a "Berlin-Tiflis Axis". However, eventually the independent Caucasian confederation was replaced by Rosenberg with the Caucasus Reich Commissariat for the immediate future.

== Since 1991 ==
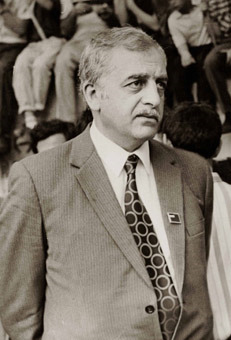
Zviad Gamsakhurdia, President of Georgia was a notable supporter of regional cooperation in the Caucasus

Since the dissolution of the Soviet Union in 1991, pan-Caucasianism has reappeared in regional politics, in particular in Chechnya and Georgia. In Georgia, pan-Caucasian sentiments manifested themselves most strongly under President Zviad Gamsakhurdia, who sought a political, military, and economic alliance between Georgians, Chechens, Abkhazians, and Circassians based on the idea of shared Ibero-Caucasian languages and common identity among autochthonous Caucasian nations. According to Stephen F. Jones, a historian and specialist on Russian and Eurasian studies, Georgian President Zviad Gamsakhurdia promoted the concept of a "Caucasian Home", which included a regional parliament for the Caucasus ("Caucasian Forum"), a "Coordinating Council", a common economic zone and an alliance against foreign interference. Jones also notes that in the early 1990s, Georgian political establishment had several "cultural visions" of the country's identity: Christian identity, the concept of "Europeanness", pan-Caucasianism, and opposition to Russia. The pan-Caucasianist tendencies in the Gamsakhurdia government strengthened as the relationship with the Western countries worsened over time. However, President Gamsakhurdia was soon overthrown by a military coup, so the "realisation of the idea of Caucasianness and the Caucasian House has never gone beyond the declaratory level or imaginative projects...", with some locals viewing this conception of the region as a "failed space (given its conflict-proneness)".

Georgian President Eduard Shevardnadze advocated for regional cooperation between Georgia, Armenia, Azerbaijan, and Russia in a more diminished form of a "Peaceful Caucasus Initiative". Jones notes that under Shevardnadze the emphasis was placed on common interests rather than ethno-cultural connections.

Chechen President Dzhokhar Dudayev also shared pan-Caucasian views with Zviad Gamsakhurdia, and this allegiance formed a pivotal basis for the concept of a "Caucasian Home". However, in Chechnya, pan-Caucasianism has primarily manifested as a political idea among jihadist militant groups, particularly during and after the Second Chechen War. Among the earliest Chechen pan-Caucasian groups was a group of militants led by Shamil Basayev, which called for the independence and unity of all Caucasian peoples in the late 1990s. This group, succeeding President Dzhokhar Dudayev's secular brand of Chechen nationalism, later morphed into an Islamist faction led by Basayev, Anzor Astemirov, and Movladi Udugov. In 2007, the Caucasus Emirate was established by a group of Chechen jihadists and led an insurgency against Russia until 2017 with the support of Islamic State.

Former Georgian President Mikheil Saakashvili have stated that he wishes to see the three Transcaucasian countries in the future “as Baltic states”.

The tri-color and the presumed flag of the Transcaucasian Democratic Federative Republic is often used as a symbol of the South Caucasian unity

Outside Georgia and Chechnya, pan-Caucasianism has become the political ideology of other groups in the region. Most notably is the Confederation of Mountain Peoples of the Caucasus (CMPC), a paramilitary group led by Kabardian politician Musa Shanibov. The CMPC, which emerged before the Soviet Union had dissolved, espoused North Caucasian confederalism and fought against Georgia during the War in Abkhazia and for Ichkeria during the First Chechen War. Later, Shanibov faded into obscurity after his arrest in Russia, and the CMPC became inactive after the assassination of its leader Yusup Soslambekov in 2000. The CMPC is controversial for its involvement in war crimes in Abkhazia, including ethnic cleansing of local Georgians in Abkhazia.

In Armenia and Azerbaijan, pan-Caucasianism is not as prominent as in Georgia. Armenians often see themselves as outside the Caucasus due to their historical homeland in the Armenian Highlands, which are located outside the Greater Caucasus mountain range.

== Sources ==
- Dallin, Alexander (1981). German Rule in Russia, 1941-1945: A Study of Occupation Policies. Avalon Publishing. ISBN 9780865311022.
