= Khachim Karmokov =

Russian politician (1941–2023)

- Хачим Кармоков
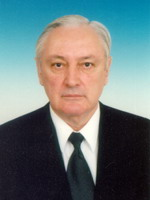
- Official portrait, 2008

Senator from Kabardino-Balkaria
- In office 1 June 2001 – 13 May 2009
- Succeeded by: Albert Kazharov

Personal details
- Born: Khachim Karmokov; 2 May 1941 Zayukovo, Baksansky District, Kabardino-Balkarian ASSR, Russian SFSR, USSR
- Died: 30 December 2023 (aged 82) Moscow, Russia
- Education: Kabardino-Balkarian State University

Khachim Mukhamedovich Karmokov (Russian: Хачим Мухамедович Кармоков; 2 May 1941 – 30 December 2023) was a Russian politician who served as a senator from Kabardino-Balkaria from 2001 to 2009.

== Life and career ==
Khachim Karmokov was born on 2 May 1941 in Baksansky District, Kabardino-Balkarian Autonomous Soviet Socialist Republic. He graduated from the Kabardino-Balkarian State University. In 1990, Karmokov was appointed Deputy Chairman of the Council of Ministers of the Kabardino-Balkarian ASSR. From 1991 to 1993, he served as Deputy Chairman of the Supreme Soviet of the Kabardino-Balkarian Autonomous Soviet Socialist Republic. In 2000, he was appointed Chief Advisor to the Chairman of the Accounts Chamber of Russia. From 2001 to 2009, he represented Kabardino-Balkaria in the Federation Council. In 2013, he was appointed the State Counselor of Kabardino-Balkaria. Karmokov died on 30 December 2023, at the age of 82.
