= Baksansky =

Baksansky (masculine), Baksanskaya (feminine), or Baksanskoye (neuter) may refer to:

- Baksansky District of the Kabardino-Balkar Republic, Russia
- Baksansky (rural locality), in the Kabardino-Balkar Republic, Russia
