= Tyrnyauz =

Town in the Kabardino-Balkarian Republic, Russia

Tyrnyauz Тырныауз
- Town
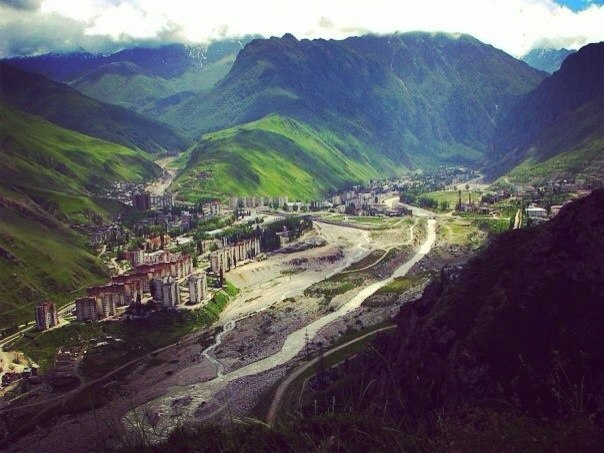
- Tyrnyauz in Summer

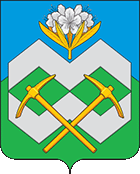
- Flag Coat of arms
- Interactive map of Tyrnyauz
- Location of Tyrnyauz Tyrnyauz (Kabardino-Balkaria)
- Coordinates: 43°24′N 42°55′E
- Country: Russia
- Federal subject: Kabardino-Balkaria
- Administrative district: Elbrussky District
- Founded: 1934
- Town status since: 1955
- Elevation: 1,307 m (4,288 ft)

Population (2010 Census)
  - Total: 21,000
  - Estimate (2025): 22,334 (+6.4%)

Administrative status
  - Capital of: Elbrussky District

Municipal status
  - Municipal district: Elbrussky Municipal District
  - Urban settlement: Tyrnyauz Urban Settlement
  - Capital of: Elbrussky Municipal District, Tyrnyauz Urban Settlement
- Time zone: UTC+3 (MSK)
- Postal code: 361621–361624
- OKTMO ID: 83648101001
- Website: www.tyrnyauz.ru

Tyrnyauz (Russian: Тырныауз; Karachay-Balkar: Тырныаўуз, Tırnıawuz) is a town and the administrative center of Elbrussky District of the Kabardino-Balkarian Republic, Russia, located on the main road leading to the Upper Baksan valley area and on the main climbing route for Mount Elbrus. Population: 21,000 (2010 census). Tyrnyauz is the largest town in the Baksan Valley and an essential provisioning point for trips into the Elbrus region.

== History ==
The city was founded as the village of Gerkhozhan in 1934, at the discovery of the Tyrnyauz tungsten-molybdenum deposit. Prior to that, on the territory of the modern city there were villages - Gerkhozhan, Kamuk, Totur and El-Dzhurt.

In 1937, the construction of the first plants began in the upper reaches of the Baksan Gorge. In the same year, the village of Gerkhozhan was renamed the working settlement of Nizhny Baksan.

On February 8, 1941, a corrective labor camp began to function at the Tyrnyauz Combine, with direct subordination to the Main Directorate of Camps for Mining and Metallurgical Enterprises. The deposit came under the control of the NKVD. The prisoners of the camp were engaged in servicing the Tyrnyauz plant: ore mining, production of molybdenum concentrate, construction of the 2nd and 3rd stages of the plant, geological exploration. The labor of prisoners was also used for the construction of the Bylymskaya power plant and the Bylymskoye coal deposit.

In November 1942, the prisoners of the camp and the rest of the workers of the plant were evacuated to Georgia in connection with the offensive of German troops during the Battle of the Caucasus. In the village of Verkhny Baksan, after returning from evacuation, in 1943, the administration of the Tyrnyauz combine and a labor camp was located. On March 8, 1944, the indigenous population of the region, the Balkars, was forcibly deported to Central Asia. The camp continued to operate until September 24, 1945. In the last year of the existence of the corrective labor camp in Tyrnyauz, it contained 5301 prisoners.

By the Decree of the Presidium of the Supreme Soviet of the RSFSR of June 10, 1955, the working settlement of Nizhniy Baksan, Elbrus District, Kabardian Autonomous Soviet Socialist Republic, was transformed into a city of regional subordination, giving it the name Tyrnyauz. In 1957, after the Decree of the Presidium of the Supreme Soviet of the USSR "On the removal of restrictions on the legal status of the Crimean Tatars, Balkars, Turks - citizens of the USSR, Kurds, Hemshils and members of their families evicted during the Great Patriotic War", the Balkars returned to their native places. Residents of the village of Nizhny Baksan (Gerkhozhan) and the villages adjacent to it settled in Tyrnyauz. In 1963, the city received the status of a city of republican (ASSR) subordination.

In 1958, the restored settlements located higher up the gorge were included in the Tyrnyauz city council. In 1995, Tyrnyauz was transferred to a city of regional subordination and transformed into the administrative center of the newly formed Elbrus region. At the same time, rural settlements - Nizhny Baksan and Elbrus - were separated from the Tyrnyauz City Council into independent administrative units.

With the collapse of the USSR and the closure of the Tyrnyauz molybdenum plant, there was a rapid outflow of population from the city, and during the census period from 1989 to 2002, the city lost a third of its population. A series of mudflows in the summer of 2000 also contributed to the rapid decline in the city's population.

In 2017, Elbrus Mining Plant LLC was established as a subsidiary of the Rostec State Corporation. As of 2025, the exploitation of the Tyrnyauzskoye field has not yet resumed. Confirmatory drilling began in 2025, with full mining operations expected around 2028. The project will be implemented in several stages. At the first stage, a license for the right to use subsoil was obtained, reserves were estimated and a feasibility study was developed, the property of the Tyrnyauz Tungsten-Molybdenum Combine was acquired. At the second stage, in 2021, the construction of buildings and structures, the improvement of roads began.

== Tyrnyauz tragedy ==
On July 18, 2000, at 11:15 p.m., a powerful mudflow flooded from the Gerkhozhan tract to Tyrnyauz. According to the Ministry of Emergency Situations of Russia, on July 18 and 19, as a result of the passage of mudflows, residential buildings were flooded and an automobile bridge across the Baksan River was destroyed. Due to the threat of a repeated mudflow, it was decided to temporarily resettle the residents of three houses. In total, 930 people were resettled from the damaged houses. The Russian Ministry of Emergency Situations restored a pedestrian bridge in the central part of the city, and installed a pontoon bridge across the Gerkhozhan-Su River. The complex of measures taken made it possible to restore the life support system. During mudflows, 8 people died, 8 were hospitalized. Nearly 40 people were reported missing.

== Administrative and municipal status ==
Within the framework of administrative divisions, Tyrnyauz serves as the administrative center of Elbrussky District, to which it is directly subordinated. As a municipal division, the town of Tyrnyauz is incorporated within Elbrussky Municipal District as Tyrnyauz Urban Settlement.

== Demographics ==
Population: 21,000 (2010 census); 21,092 (2002 census); 30,778 (1989 Soviet census)..

=== Ethnic composition ===
As of the 2002 Census, the ethnic distribution of the population was:

- Balkars: 47.3%
- Russians: 25.3%
- Kabardins: 16.1%
- Ukrainians: 1.4%
- Ossetians: 1.0%
- Other ethnicities: 8.9%

== Notable people ==
- Valery Kokov, former President of the Kabardino-Balkarian Republic
- Khadzhimurat Akkaev, weightlifter
- Khyzyr Appayev, footballer
