= Baksan (inhabited locality) =

Baksan (Russian: Баксан) is the name of several inhabited localities in the Kabardino-Balkar Republic, Russia.

Urban localities

- Baksan (town), a town; administratively incorporated as a town of republic significance; 43°42′N 43°34′E

Rural localities

- Baksan (rural locality), a rural locality classified as a road crossing in Maysky District; 43°42′N 44°5′E
