= Arsen Kanokov =

Russian politician (born 1957)

- Арсен Каноков; Къанокъуэ Арсен
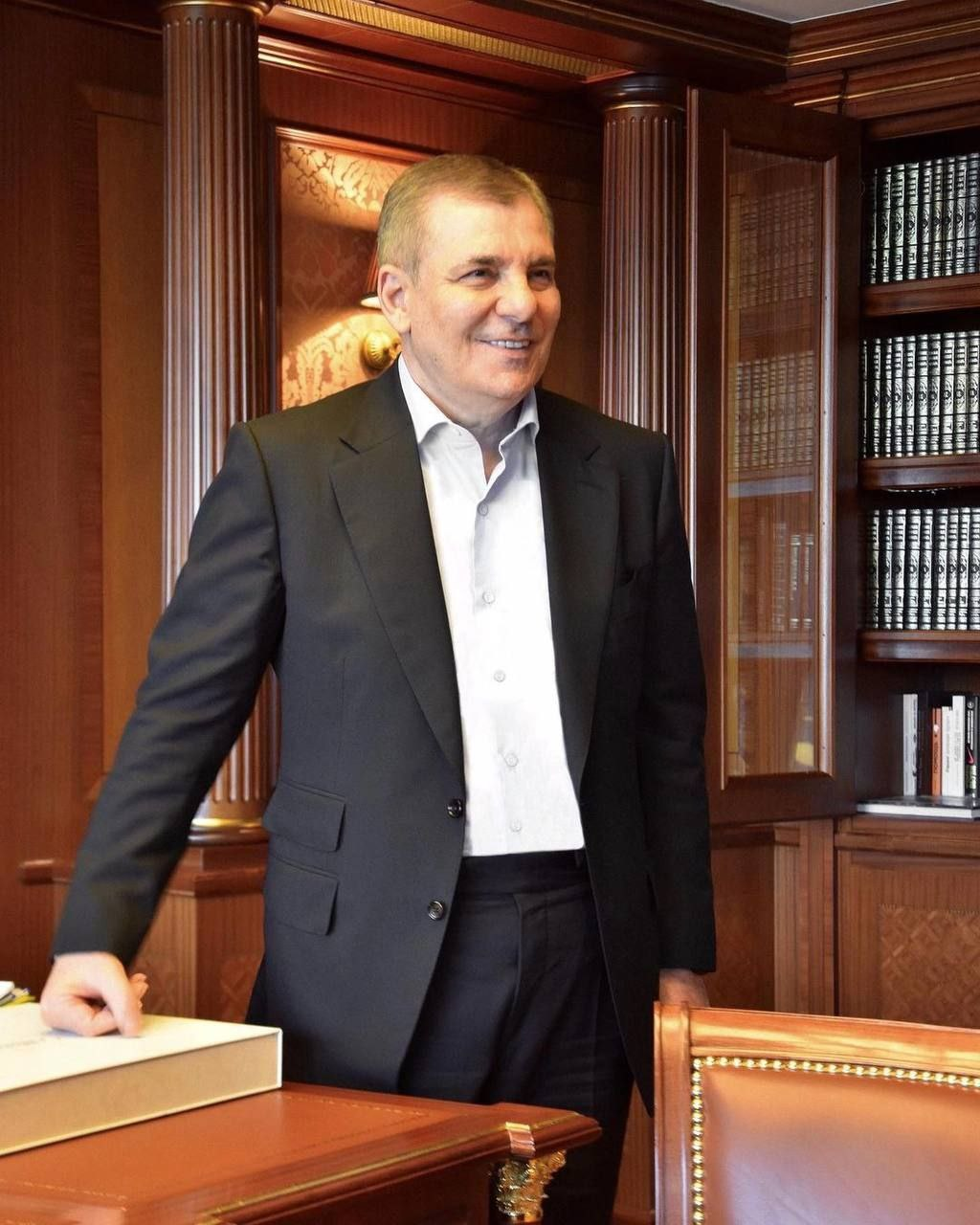
- Kanokov in 2023

Russian Federation Senator from the Kabardino-Balkar Republic
- Incumbent
- Assumed office 10 October 2014
- Preceded by: Ilyas Bechelov
- In office 25 December 2013 – 10 October 2014
- Preceded by: Fatima Ivanova
- Succeeded by: Mukharby Ulbashev

2nd Head of the Kabardino-Balkar Republic
- In office September 28, 2005 – December 6, 2013
- Preceded by: Valery Kokov
- Succeeded by: Yury Kokov

Personal details
- Born: February 22, 1957 (age 69) Shitkhala, RSFSR, USSR
- Party: United Russia
- Spouse: Fatima Kanokova
- Profession: Economist
- Awards: Order of Merit for the Fatherland; Order of Friendship

Arsen Bashirovich Kanokov (Kabardian: Къанокъуэ Арсен, Qanoqwə Arsen; Russian: Арсен Баширович Каноков; born February 22, 1957) is a Russian politician, who served as head of the Kabardino-Balkaria republic from 2005 to 2013.

== Biography ==
Arsen Bashirovich Kanokov is a well-known political figure, a Doctor of Economics. He handles the post of The Head of Kabardino-Balkar Republic (KBR) since 2005 (re-elected in 2010).

Arsen Kanokov was born on 22 February 1957 in a small village Sheethala of KBR. His parents were doing a simple labour: his father worked in a sovkhoz and his mother was a medical assistant. For 27 years father of a future-Head of the Republic had been working as a vegetable grower, only later having become an agronomist, then a head of the village soviet.

Arsen Kanokov was studying in School No.1 of Nartkala town, he graduated with a big success. Just after graduating he enters Plekhanov Russian University of Economics, proving himself as a talented student and fulfilling successfully his education in a capital university. After graduating from the university in 1984 Kanokov serves in Soviet Army. He gets demobilised in 1985, then begins working in Moscow fruit and vegetable association. Arsen Kanokov was working for four years in different branches of the association, receiving the shop manager's position in 1987.

Same year Kanokov initiates the creation of a trade and purchase cooperation with a trade name of "Kodex". It gets re-organised to "Sindika" holding company in 1991. Its scope includes several spheres: bank operation and investments, building in Moscow and its region, multi-functional trade networks' management (including Arsen Bashirovich's native region of KBR). From 1994 to 1998 Arsen Kanakov is the holding's president. He proves himself as a talented organiser and professional manager. While working for "Sindika" Kanokov purchased 30% of ZAO "Centrocredit Bank" stock and entered the directors committee, where he remained till 2003. He successfully combined his activity of a manager with a banker's and political career – in 1998 he became a permanent representative of KBR to Russian President.

In 2003 Arsen Kanokov was elected as a deputy of the State Duma of Russian Federation. He became a "United Russia" party member in 2004. The experience he got throughout the years helped him in his political career – after entering the party Kanokov becomes a vice-chairman in Russian Duma's committee corresponding to budget forming and tax regulation. In the meantime Arsen Kanokov is creating a strong relation with the science. He completed his PhD thesis in 1998 and obtained a doctor's degree in 2001. Arsen Kanokov leads the investigations, takes part in board of education's activity, becomes a member of Academy of natural sciences and of Academy of economical sciences and undertaking.

=== Arsen Kanokov's political career ===
Russian Federation President Vladimir Putin mentioned Kanokov's well-done work in Russian Federation and his activity in state economy. In September 2005 Putin nominates Kanokov as a new president of Kabardino-Balkar Republic. His candidature is supported with the Republic's Legislative Assembly. During Kanokov's presidency KBR becomes an economical leader of Northern Caucasus Region – Kanokov has fully justified the given trust. Russian next President Dmitry Medvedev nominates Kanokov as a Head of the Republic in 2010 – and he is again supported with the majority of the Legislative Assembly. In 2009 Kanokov is in the head of Russian Federation's list of persons to be elected to Russian Parliament. Yet he did not accept the deputy mandate, nor did he do it in 5th and 6th convocation of Duma (in 2007 and 2011).

Arsen Kanokov is known as a generous sponsor and supporter. He used his personal savings to erect a temple and a mosque, as well as monuments; moreover he supported the restoration of a famous restaurant "Elbrus" and hotel "Intourist". The Head of Kabardino-Balkar Republic Arsen Kanokov provides a material assistance to charitable actions and events, he sponsors the families with many children and orphanage houses, also the football teams (including PFC Spartak Nalchik). He asserts that his wife and mother of his three children is a person who supported the future Head of the Republic during his whole long political career, including difficult situations and hard moments. Arsen Kanokov enjoys his electors' confidence, because his name is not sullied with a big scandal despite his big social position.

=== List of rewards ===
- 2007: Reverend Sergius of Radonezh Order (2nd degree);
- 2008: Peter the Great Order (1st degree), golden badge "for peacemaking and charitable activity" – the highest prize from the International Social Fund "Russian Fund of Peace";
- 2009: "Slava Otechestva ("Valour of the Fatherland")" Order, a grand-prix nominee of "Person of the Year 2009" annual prize, founded by RBK.
- 2010: "In Remembrance of 30th Anniversary of Olympic Games in Moscow 1980" badge.

== Sanctions ==
In December 2022 the EU sanctioned Arsen Kanokov in relation to the 2022 Russian invasion of Ukraine.

== Personal life ==
Has three children. He is a Muslim.

Kanokov.org is the official website of the political movement "Youth for Kanokov". This organization works toward unifying young people in Kabardino-Balkaria.

Political offices
Preceded by Valery Kokov	Head of Kabardino-Balkaria; 2005–2013	Succeeded by Yury Kokov
