= Vladimir Sokhov =

Russian politician (1939–2023)

Member of the State Duma
- In office 17 December 1995 – 29 December 2003

Personal details
- Born: Vladimir Kazbulatovich Sokhov; 10 September 1939 Urozhaynoye, Kabardino-Balkarian ASSR, Russian SFSR, USSR
- Died: 22 September 2023 (aged 84)
- Party: CPSU (until 1991); NDR
- Education: Kabardino-Balkarian State University; Academy of Social Sciences under the CPSU Central Committee

Vladimir Kazbulatovich Sokhov (Russian: Владимир Казбулатович Сохов; 10 September 1939 – 22 September 2023) was a Russian politician. A member of Our Home – Russia, he served in the State Duma from 1995 to 2003.

Sokhov died on 22 September 2023, at the age of 84.
