= Yury Kokov =

Russian politician

- Юрий Коков; КӀуэкӀуэ Юрэ
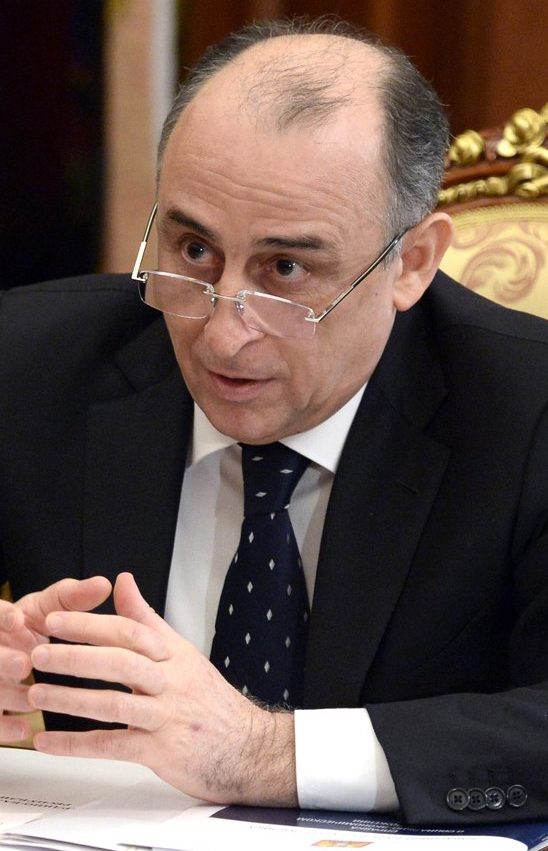
- Kokov in 2016

3rd Head of the Kabardino-Balkarian Republic
- In office December 6, 2013 – September 26, 2018
- Preceded by: Arsen Kanokov
- Succeeded by: Kazbek Kokov

Personal details
- Born: August 13, 1955 (age 70) Nalchik, RSFSR, USSR
- Party: United Russia
- Awards: Order of Courage Order "For Merit to the Fatherland"

Yury Alexandrovich Kokov (Kabardian: КӀуэкӀуэ Александр и къуэ Юрэ, romanized: K'uək'uə Aleksandr yi quə Yurə; Russian: Юрий Александрович Коков; born August 13, 1955) is a Russian politician who served as Head of Kabardino-Balkaria from 2013 to 2018.

He has the federal state civilian service rank of 1st class Active State Councillor of the Russian Federation.

== Biography ==
Kokov was born on August 13, 1955, in Nalchik, which was then part of the Russian SFSR. His mother was a cutter at a garment factory and his father was a manager in the Ministry of Social Security who died in 1979. He had one sibling, an older half-sister named Lucy who was a cook, her father died in the Great Patriotic War. He first attended secondary school No. 4 on Lenin Street in Nalchik, where he described himself as "not an excellent student" who regularly played football. Kokov then graduated from the Law Department of Rostov State University and joined the agencies of the Ministry of Internal Affairs of the Kabardino-Balkarian ASSR in 1979. From 1979 to 1987 he then worked in various positions in the criminal investigation units in the Ministry of International Affairs of Kabardino-Balkaria. In 1987 he was then appointed Head of the Administrative and Financial Departments of the Council of Ministers in the republic. From 1991 to 1995 he was then deputy head of the criminal police service and head of the Department for Combating Economic Crimes in the ministry, and was then for four years until 1999 Deputy Minister of Internal Affairs and head of the criminal police service. This was also the time he started his political career, as in 1993 and 1997 he was elected to the House of Representatives of the Parliament of Kabardino-Balkaria, heading the Commission on Legislation and Security.

In 1999, he was transferred to work in Moscow. On December 6, 2013, he was appointed Acting Head of the Kabardino-Balkarian Republic. On October 9, 2014, deputies of the parliament of Kabardino-Balkaria unanimously elected Kokov as head of the republic. In September 2018, Vladimir Putin appointed Yuri Kokov as Deputy Secretary of the Security Council of Russia.

== Family ==
Kokov is married Zhanna Kokova (née Babaeva), who is a member of the ethnic Balkar clan, which has led to accusations he favors members of the Balkar elite. They have two children.

== Sources ==
- Официальный сайт Главы и Правительства Кабарди́но-Балка́рская Республики

Political offices
Preceded by Arsen Kanokov	Head of the Kabardino-Balkarian Republic; 2013-2018	Succeeded by Kazbek Kokov
