= Valery Kokov =

Soviet/Russian politician

- Валерий Коков; КӀуэкӀуэ Валерий
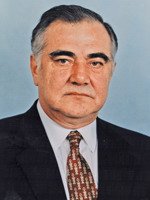

1st President of Kabardino-Balkaria
- In office January 9, 1992 – February 23, 2005
- Preceded by: Position established
- Succeeded by: Arsen Kanokov

Chairman of the Supreme Soviet of the Kabardino-Balkarian Autonomous Soviet Socialist Republic
- In office March 30, 1990 – September 17, 1991
- Preceded by: Position established
- Succeeded by: Khachim Karmokov

First Secretary of the Kabardino-Balkarian CPSU Regional Committee
- In office February 21, 1990 – September 1, 1990
- Preceded by: Yevgeny Yeliseyev
- Succeeded by: Boris Zumakulov

Personal details
- Born: October 18, 1941 Nizhny Baksan, Kabardino-Balkarian ASSR, RSFSR, Soviet Union
- Died: October 29, 2005 (aged 64) Moscow, Russia
- Party: Communist Party of the Soviet Union (1969–1991)
- Spouse(s): Violetta Taubievna Kokova(????–2005) (his death)
- Children: 2
- Awards: Order of Merit for the Fatherland; Order of Friendship of Peoples; Order of Honour and Glory of Abkhazia

Valery Mukhamedovich Kokov (Russian: Валерий Мухамедович Коков; Kabardian: КӀуэкӀуэ Мухьэмэд и къуэ Валерий, romanized: K'uək'uə Muhəməd i quə Valeriy, October 18, 1941 – October 29, 2005) was a Soviet and Russian politician of Kabardian ethnicity.

== Early life and political career ==
Kokov was born in Tyrnyauz, Kabardino-Balkaria. He was the leader of Kabardino-Balkaria from 1990 to 2005. He was chairman of the republic's supreme Soviet from 1990 to 1991 and was elected President for the first time in 1992.

He effectively neutralized opposition and was re-elected twice in landslide victories; in 1997 with 98% of the vote and in 2002 with 87% of the vote. He successfully maintained stability in the republic though it is close to the war-torn republic of Chechnya. Kokov suffered from cancer for several years before his death. On February 23, 2005, he announced his resignation.

== Resignation and Death ==
He did not give any reason for his departure, which came nearly a year and a half before the end of his term. He stayed in office until his successor, Arsen Kanokov was chosen two weeks later. During October 2005 his health rapidly declined and he died in the central clinical hospital in Moscow of cancer, a month after leaving office. He is survived by his daughter, son and his wife.

== Personal life ==
Kokov was married to Violetta Taubievna Kokova, and they had one daughter and one son, Kazbek Kokov, who became head of KBR in 2018.

== Honours and awards ==
- Order "For Merit to the Fatherland";
  - 2nd class (9 May 2005) – for outstanding contribution strengthening Russian statehood and many years of diligent work
  - 3rd class (15 October 2001) – for outstanding contribution strengthening Russian statehood, friendship and cooperation between nations
- Order of Friendship of Peoples (25 March 1994) – for his great personal contribution to strengthening Russian statehood and stability of international relations in the Kabardino-Balkarian Republic
- Order of the Red Banner of Labour
- Order "Honor and Glory", 2nd class (Abkhazia, 2003)
- Diploma of the Government of the Russian Federation (11 October 2001) – for his great personal contribution to the economy of Kabardino-Balkaria and long-term fruitful work

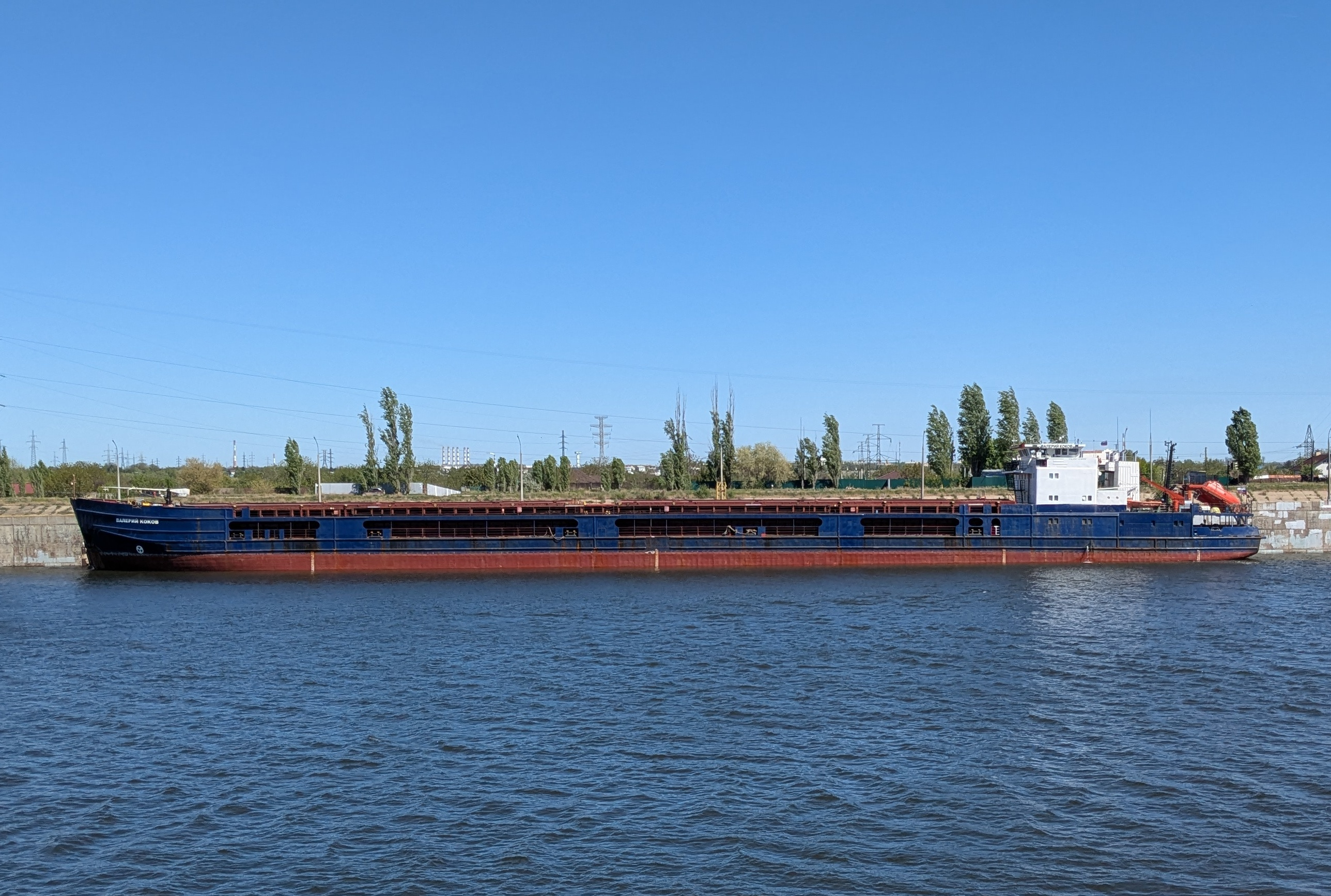

Kokov's name has been used:

- Kabardino-Balkarian State Agricultural Academy named VM Kokov, Nalchik
- Streets in Volgograd, Grozny and Dygulybgey, Baksan region, Kabardino-Balkaria

Political offices
Preceded by Position Created	President of Kabardino-Balkaria; 1992–2005	Succeeded by Arsen Kanokov
