= Kazbek Kokov =

Russian politician (born 1973)

- Казбек Коков; КӀуэкӀуэ Къазбэч
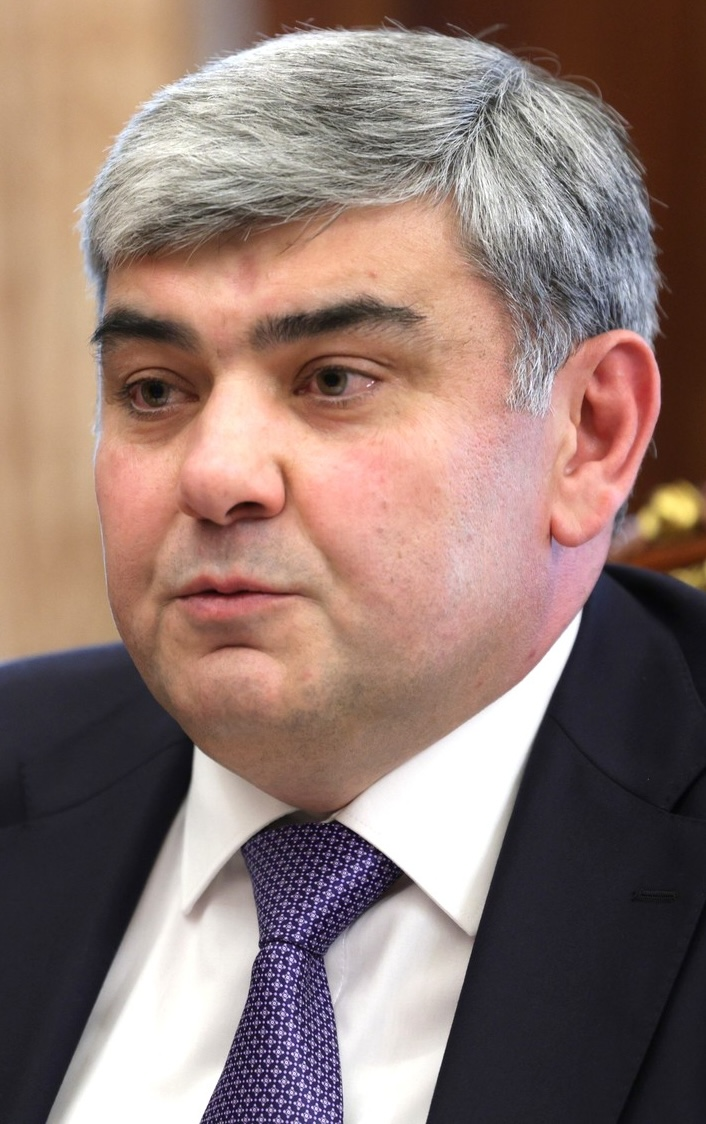
- Kokov in 2024

4th Head of the Kabardino-Balkar Republic
- Incumbent
- Assumed office 26 September 2018; Acting: until 3 October 2019
- Preceded by: Yury Kokov

Personal details
- Born: 20 July 1973 (age 52) Vtoroy Lesken, Russian SFSR, Soviet Union
- Party: United Russia
- Parent: Valery Kokov (father)

Kazbek Valeryevich Kokov (Kabardian: КӀуэкӀуэ Валерэ и къуэ Къазбэч; Karachay-Balkar: Кокланы Валербийни жашы Казбек, Russian: Казбек Валерьевич Коков; born 20 July 1973) is a Russian politician. He is head of Kabardino-Balkaria since 3 October 2019 (acting head since September 2018). He is the son of the first president of Kabardino-Balkaria, Valery Kokov.

== Biography ==
Kokov was born on 20 July 1973 in Vtoroy Lesken, which was then part of the Russian SFSR. His father was the first President of Kabardino-Balkaria, Valery Kokov. He eventually graduated from the Kabardino-Balkar Institute of Agroforestry with a degree in agronomics. Afterward, from 1995 to 2002, he worked as Deputy General Director for the commercial and general matters of OAO Nalchiksky Halvich Plant. In addition, starting in 2002 until 2010, he has been the General Director of JSC "Kabbalkresury".

From 2003 to 2007 he was a deputy of the City Council of the city of Nalchik. In 2009 he became a Member of Parliament in Kabardino-Balkaria, which he is still part of. In 2010 he became Deputy Minister of Agriculture and Food of Kabardino-Balkaria, and then in 2013 he became adviser to the regional management unit of the Russian President for domestic policy and curator of the North Caucasus region.

On 26 September 2018 Kokov was appointed Acting Head of Kabardino-Balkaria, and on 3 October 2019 became its official head. He was re-elected in 2024.

== Family ==
Kokov is married to Liana Ruslanovna, who is a teacher of labor laws at the Kabardino Balkarian State University located in Nalchik. Together they have two daughters.

Political offices
Preceded by Yury Kokov	Head of the Kabardino-Balkar Republic; 2018 —	Incumbent
