= Shapsug national district =

Former district in Krasnodar Krai

The Shapsug national district or Shapsug national raion (Adyghe: Шапсыгъэ Националнэ Район Šapsyġe Nacionalne Rajon, Russian: Шапсугский национальный район Šapsugskij nacional′nyj rajon) was a district that was established in 1924 as a national district (raion) for the Circassian Shapsugs tribe of the Black Sea Circassians (Russian: причерноморские адыги) within the Krasnodar Krai in the Soviet Union, now Russia. It was abolished after the end of the Second World War in 1945.

== History ==
In 1864, after the end of the century-long Russian–Circassian War between the Circassians (Adyghes) who formed the historical population of Circassia and the Russian Empire, a major part of the Shapsugs, who lived on Black Sea coast from modern Sochi to Tuapse, were either killed in the Circassian genocide or expelled to the Ottoman Empire like the other Circassian tribes.

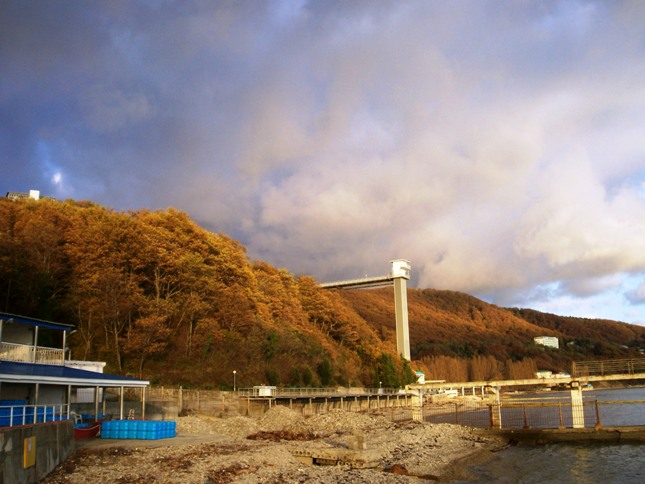
Black Sea coast near Tuapse in November

Because the Shapsugs were one of the most stubborn enemies of the Russian Empire, they suffered more than the other Circassian tribes. They were the last of their alliance to surrender to the occupiers' army, and kept resisting the Russians in a holy war, for more than 20 years after the end of the Russian-Circassian War in 1864.

As a result of the tsars policy to kill the Circassian people in the Circassian genocide or expel them to the Ottoman Empire, the remaining Shapsugs who survived abandoned their remained coastal villages to the eastern mountains of Shapsugia to protect themselves from the tyranny of their occupiers, the Zaporozhian Cossacks. Later the descendants of these Cossacks renamed themselves Kuban Cossacks and adopted the Circassian dress and uniform. The other motive for Shapsugs settling the mountains was to keep resisting and striking against Russians outposts on the Circassian Black Sea coast.

When the Shapsugs felt that the resistance was impossible due to the severing of marine logistics lines and to the lack of weapons, they stopped resisting. Some went to settlements previously occupied by other Adyghe tribes in the Kuban and established their own villages The remaining Shapsugs returned to their regions in the Circassian coast on the Black Sea, and established newer ones in the place of their previous burned villages between 1870 and 1880.

=== Establishment of the Shapsug national district ===
The Shapsug national district was established on the 6 September 1924 as a part of the Black Sea Okrug of the South-Eastern Oblast. The district contained around 3400 Shapsugs, and the center of the district was the coastal city of Tuapse. Its area was around 462 square kilometres (178 mi^{2}).

In the beginning of 1925, the district was divided into 4 village councils (Karpovskij [Карповский], Kičmaj [Кичмай], Krasno-Aleksandrovskij [Красно-Александровский], and Pseušxo [Псеушхо]).

The South-Eastern Oblast was abolished on October 16, 1924, and the district was transferred to newly established North Caucasus Krai. In July 1930, okrugs were abolished, and the district was directly subordinated to the krai. In 1930, the center of the Shapsug national district was transferred to Krasno-Aleksandrovskoye (today Kalezh), and the district was divided into 8 village councils (Kamir-Astrovskij [Камир-Астовский], Karpovskij [Карповский], Kičmajskij [Кичмайский], Krasno-Aleksandrovskij [Красно-Александровский], Lazarevskij [Лазаревский], Psebinskij [Псебинский], Pseušxovskij [Псеушховский], and Sovet-Kvadže [Совет-Квадже]). In March 1931, the district center was transferred to Soviet-Kvadzhe, and in January 1934, Lazarevskoye was transferred to Shapsug national district as well and became the district center.

=== End of the Shapsug national district ===
In 1945, the Shapsug national district was renamed Lazarevsky district and it ceased to be a national district. The Shapsug called it Psyṣ̂wap (Adyghe: Псышӏуап) instead of Lazarevsky because Lazarevsky was named for one of the enemies of the Circassian nation, Mikhail Lazarev, who facilitated the invasion and conquest of Circassia, and put a siege over it during the Russian-Circassian War. In 1961, the district was subordinated to the city of Sochi and is currently known as Lazarevsky City District.
