= Elbrussky District =

Elbrussky District Эльбрусский район (Russian)
- District

Other transcription(s)
  - Karachay-Balkar: Эльбрус район
  - Kabardian: Ӏуащхьэмахуэ къедзыгъуэ
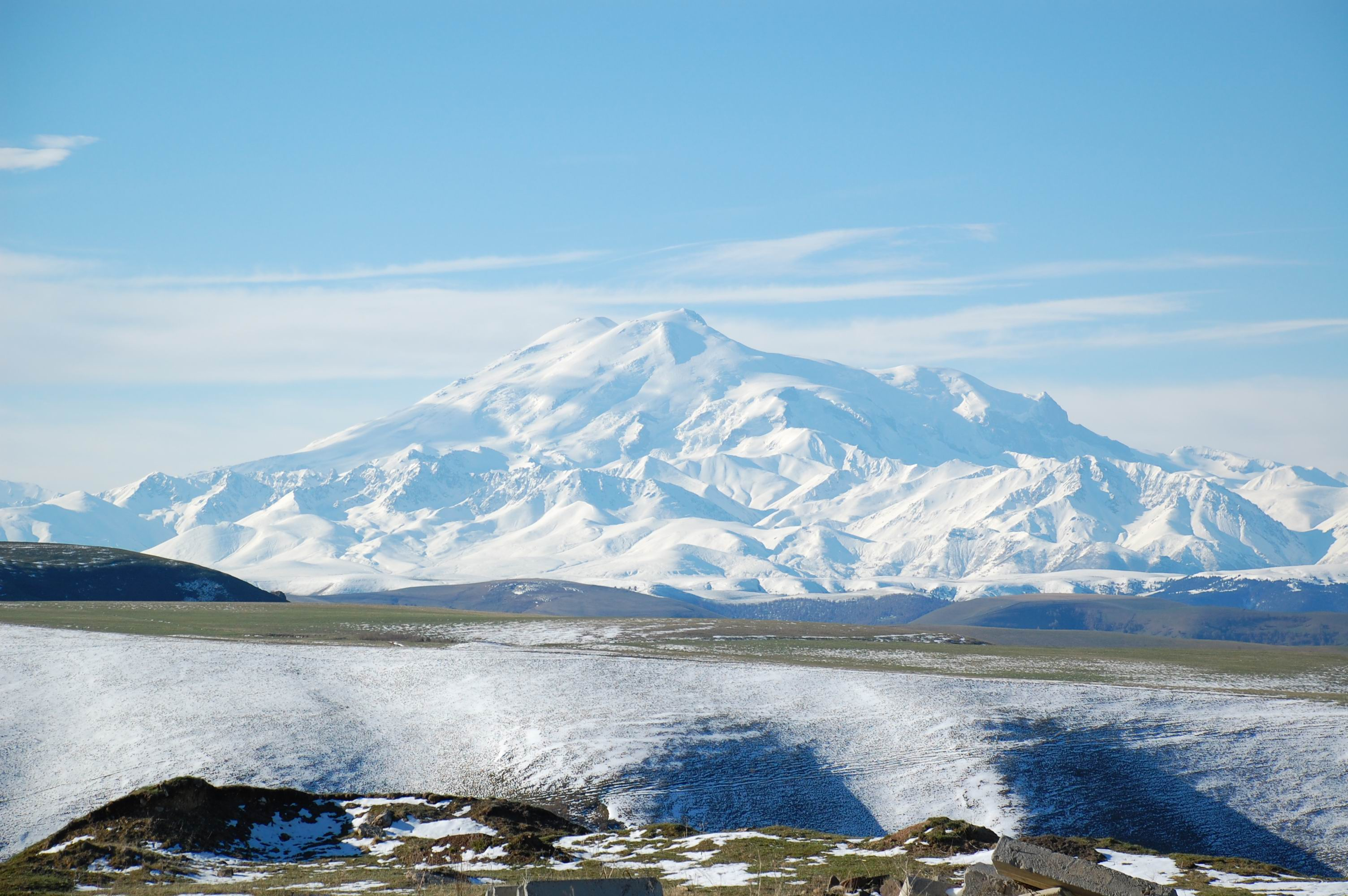
- Mount Elbrus, the highest mountain in Europe, is located in Elbrussky District

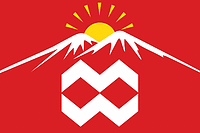
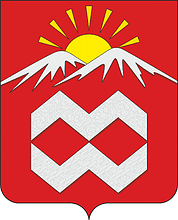
- Flag Coat of arms
- Location of Elbrussky District in the Kabardino-Balkar Republic
- Coordinates: 43°24′N 42°55′E
- Country: Russia
- Federal subject: Kabardino-Balkar Republic
- Established: 1935
- Administrative center: Tyrnyauz

Area
  - Total: 1,850.43 km^{2} (714.46 sq mi)

Population (2010 Census)
  - Total: 36,260
  - Density: 19.60/km^{2} (50.75/sq mi)
  - Urban: 57.9%
  - Rural: 42.1%

Administrative structure
  - Inhabited localities: 1 cities/towns, 10 rural localities

Municipal structure
  - Municipally incorporated as: Elbrussky Municipal District
  - Municipal divisions: 1 urban settlements, 6 rural settlements
- Time zone: UTC+3 (MSK)
- OKTMO ID: 83648000
- Website: http://el.adm-kbr.ru

Population of Elbrussky District
- 2010 Census: 36,260
- 2002 Census: 35,968

Elbrussky District (Russian: Эльбру́сский райо́н; Karachay-Balkar: Эльбрус район; Kabardian: Ӏуащхьэмахуэ къедзыгъуэ) is an administrative and a municipal district (raion), one of the ten in the Kabardino-Balkar Republic, Russia. It is located in the western and southwestern parts of the republic. The area of the district is 1,850.43 square kilometers (714.46 sq mi). Its administrative center is the town of Tyrnyauz. As of the 2010 Census, the total population of the district was 36,260, with the population of Tyrnyauz accounting for 57.9% of that number.

== Administrative and municipal status ==
Within the framework of administrative divisions, Elbrussky District is one of the ten in the Kabardino-Balkar Republic and has administrative jurisdiction over one town (Tyrnyauz) and ten rural localities. As a municipal division, the district is incorporated as Elbrussky Municipal District. The town of Tyrnyauz is incorporated as an urban settlement and the ten rural localities are incorporated into six rural settlements within the municipal district. The town of Tyrnyauz serves as the administrative center of both the administrative and municipal district.
