= Head of the Kabardino-Balkarian Republic =

Highest-ranking official in Kabardino-Balkaria, Russia

- Глава Кабардино-Балкарской Республики (Russian); Къэбэрдей-Балъкъэрым Республикэм и Тхьэмадэ (Kabardian); Къабарты-Малкъар Республиканы Башчысы (Karachay-Balkar)
- Standard for the Head of the Republic

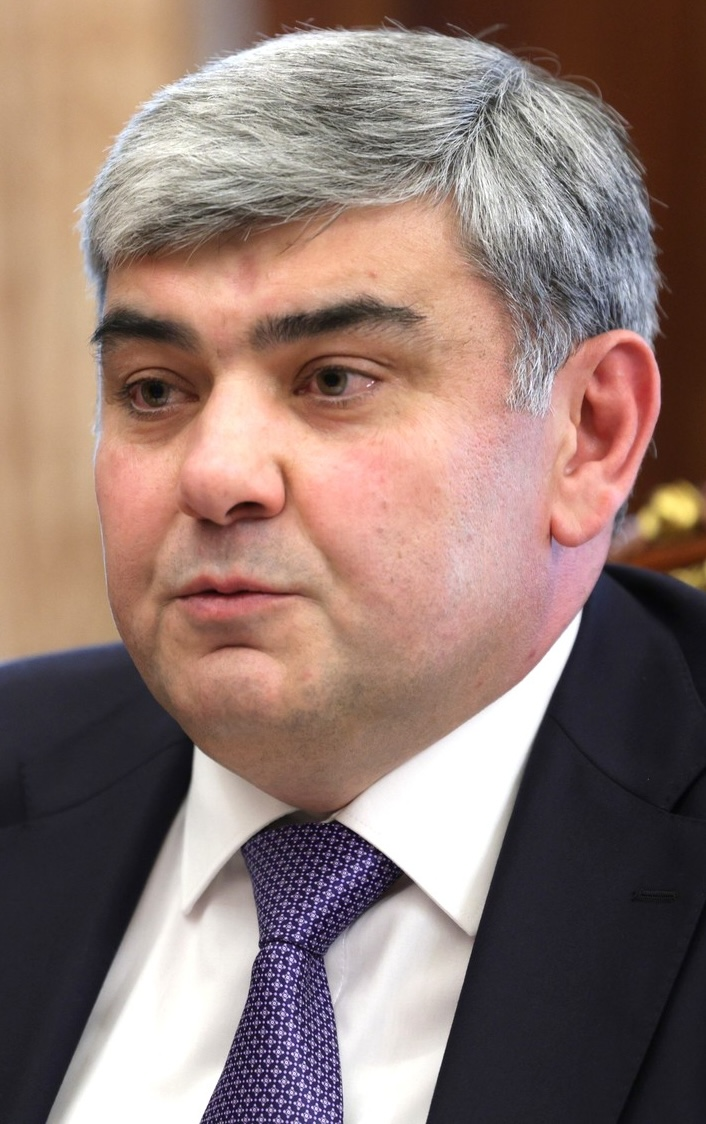
- Incumbent; Kazbek Kokov since 26 september 2018
- Executive branch of the Kabardino-Balkarian Republic
- Style: His Excellency; The Honorable
- Type: Governor; Head of state; Head of government
- Seat: Nalchik
- Nominator: Political parties
- Appointer: Parliament of Kabardino-Balkaria
- Term length: 5 years, renewable
- Formation: 9 January 1992
- First holder: Valery Kokov
- Website: Official website

The Head of the Kabardino-Balkarian Republic (formerly President of the Kabardino-Balkarian Republic), is the highest office within the Government of Kabardino-Balkarian Republic, Russia and the Head of State and Head of Government of the KBR.

== List of officeholders ==
No.	Portrait	Name (born–died)	Term of office			Political party	Election	Ref.
No.	Portrait	Name (born–died)	Took office	Left office	Time in office	Political party	Election	Ref.
1		Valery Kokov (1941–2005)	9 January 1992	16 September 2005	13 years, 250 days	Independent	1991–92; 1997; 2002	
–		Gennady Gubin (born 1944)	16 September 2005	28 September 2005	12 days	Independent	– (Note: Acting head of the republic as prime minister.)	
2		Arsen Kanokov (born 1957)	28 September 2005	6 December 2013	8 years, 69 days	United Russia	2005 (Note: Appointed by the President of Russia with the consent of the Parliament.); 2010	
–		Yury Kokov (born 1955)	6 December 2013	9 October 2014	4 years, 294 days	United Russia	– (Note: Acting head of the republic.)	
3		Yury Kokov (born 1955)	9 October 2014	26 September 2018	4 years, 294 days	United Russia	2014 (Note: Indirect election.)	
–		Kazbek Kokov (born 1973)	26 September 2018	3 October 2019	6 years, 7 days	United Russia	–	
4		Kazbek Kokov (born 1973)	3 October 2019	Incumbent	6 years, 7 days	United Russia	2019; 2024	
