= Confederation of Mountain Peoples of the Caucasus =

Former militarized political organization in the Caucasus

- Конфедерация горских народов Кавказа
- Flag
- Leaders: Musa Shanibov (1989–1996); Yusup Soslanbekov (1996–2000)
- Dates active: 1989–2000
- Active regions: North Caucasus
- Ideology: North Caucasian confederalism
- Wars: War in Abkhazia (1992–93)

The Confederation of Mountain Peoples of the Caucasus (CMPC; Russian: Конфедерация горских народов Кавказа (КГНК); until 1991 known as Assembly of Mountain Peoples of the Caucasus) was a militarised political organisation in the North Caucasus, active around the time of the dissolution of the Soviet Union and after, from 1989 to 2000. It played a decisive role in the 1992–1993 War in Abkhazia, rallying militants from the North Caucasian republics. Its forces have been accused of committing war crimes, including the ethnic cleansing of Georgians. The Confederation has been inactive since the assassination of its second leader, Yusup Soslanbekov, in 2000.

== Creation ==
On the initiative of the Abkhaz ethno-nationalist movement Aidgylara, the Assembly of the Mountain Peoples of the Caucasus was established in Abkhazia's capital Sukhumi on 25 and 26 August 1989. On 13 and 14 October 1990, the Assembly held its second congress in Nalchik, Kabardino-Balkaria, where it was transformed into the so-called Mountain Republic. Sixteen nations of the Northern Caucasus joined the Confederation. However, the Turkic peoples of the North Caucasus refused to join it, and the Ingush refused as well due to its anti-Russian character. The Assembly elected the president (Musa Shanibov) and 16 vice presidents. Yusup Soslanbekov was the chairman of the Caucasian Parliament and Sultan Sosnaliyev was appointed the head of the Confederation's military department. A third assembly was held in Sukhumi on 1 and 2 November 1991, when the organization was renamed to the Confederation of Mountain Peoples of the Caucasus. In the autumn of 1991, Chechen president Dzhokhar Dudayev took the organization under his patronage in Chechnya. The organization rivaled Zviad Gamsakhurdia, an exiled ex-president of Georgia in Chechnya who advocated for the all-Caucasian unity instead of the North Caucasian confederalism and had friendly relations with Dudayev. The organization demanded the secession of the Northern Caucasus from Russia.

== War in Abkhazia ==
Following the outbreak of War in Abkhazia in August 1992, the Confederation held its 11th parliamentary session in Grozny. The Confederation created assault detachments of volunteers that were later deployed in Abkhazia during the war. The confederation raised about 1,500 volunteers in the span of a month. It was reported that Shamil Basayev became commander of CMPC forces in 1992. Russia turned a blind eye toward the mobilization conducted by the Confederation, and allowed its Chechen troops to reach Abkhazia, while also supplying them with weapons. The Confederate troops passed through the Russian territory without any issues. When they reached Kabardino-Balkaria, initially the rumors spread that they were planning to attack Nalchik, but after they explained that they needed a safe route to Abkhazia, they were assisted by the local authorities and given fuel. According to one version, Russia supported the participation of the Confederation in the Abkhazian war to "eliminate an imminent Adyghe threat" and "channel separatism" from its own territory to Abkhazia against Georgia as the separatist tendencies began to grow in Nalchik in the summer-autumn of 1992. Shamil Basayev's detachment reportedly collaborated with the Russian GRU and military during this war, including receiving training and cooperating on the battlefield with the GRU specialists, which was acknowledged by Basayev.

=== Sukhumi Massacre ===
On September 27, 1993 the Abkhaz side violated the UN-mediated cease-fire agreement (the Georgian side had agreed to pull out all heavy artillery and tanks from Sukhumi in return for a cease-fire) by storming defenceless Sukhumi. The Confederates moved into Sukhumi and started to sweep through the streets of the city. As the city was engulfed by heavy fighting, civilians took refuge in abandoned houses and apartment buildings. Some of the civilians of Georgian ethnicity were massacred after their discovery by the Confederates. By late afternoon the remainder of the Georgian troops surrendered to the Abkhaz side. The majority of Georgian POWs were executed on the same day by Abkhaz formations and Confederates. Few civilians and military personnel managed to survive the massacre. The massacre continued for two weeks after the fall of Sukhumi (See Ethnic cleansing of Georgians in Abkhazia).

== Later history ==
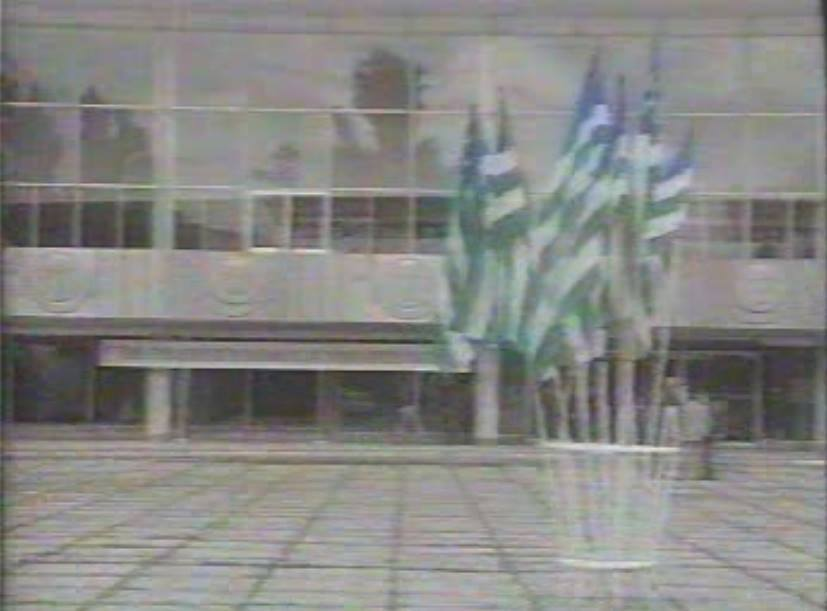
IV (extraordinary) congress of the Confederation of Peoples of the Caucasus. Grozny, Chechen Republic, October 3-4, 1992

Following the Abkhazian war, the Confederation went into a period of decline largely due to the feuds among its pro- and anti-Kremlin factions. It experienced a brief revival in December 1994, when Shanibov rallied thousands across the North Caucasus to block roads to the Russian forces heading to Grozny. Shamil Basayev and others would put the training they had received from Russia during the Abkhazian war against Russia itself during the Chechen wars. However, the change of power in Shanibov's home republic, Kabardino-Balkaria, in favor of a strongly pro-Moscow leader prevented him from exerting any political influence in the region, forcing him to retire from politics in 1996. Since then, the organization has had no role in Caucasus affairs. It never disbanded, but has been completely inactive since Shanibov's successor, Yusup Soslanbekov, was assassinated in Moscow on July 27, 2000.

== Controversy ==
The confederate forces have been accused (inter alia by Georgian State Commission of Ascertaining Facts of the Policies of Ethnic Cleansing and Genocide) of committing war crimes, including the ethnic cleansing of Georgians.
