= Kabardino-Balkarian State University =

University in Russia

- Кабардино-Балкарский государственный университет имени Х. М. Бербекова
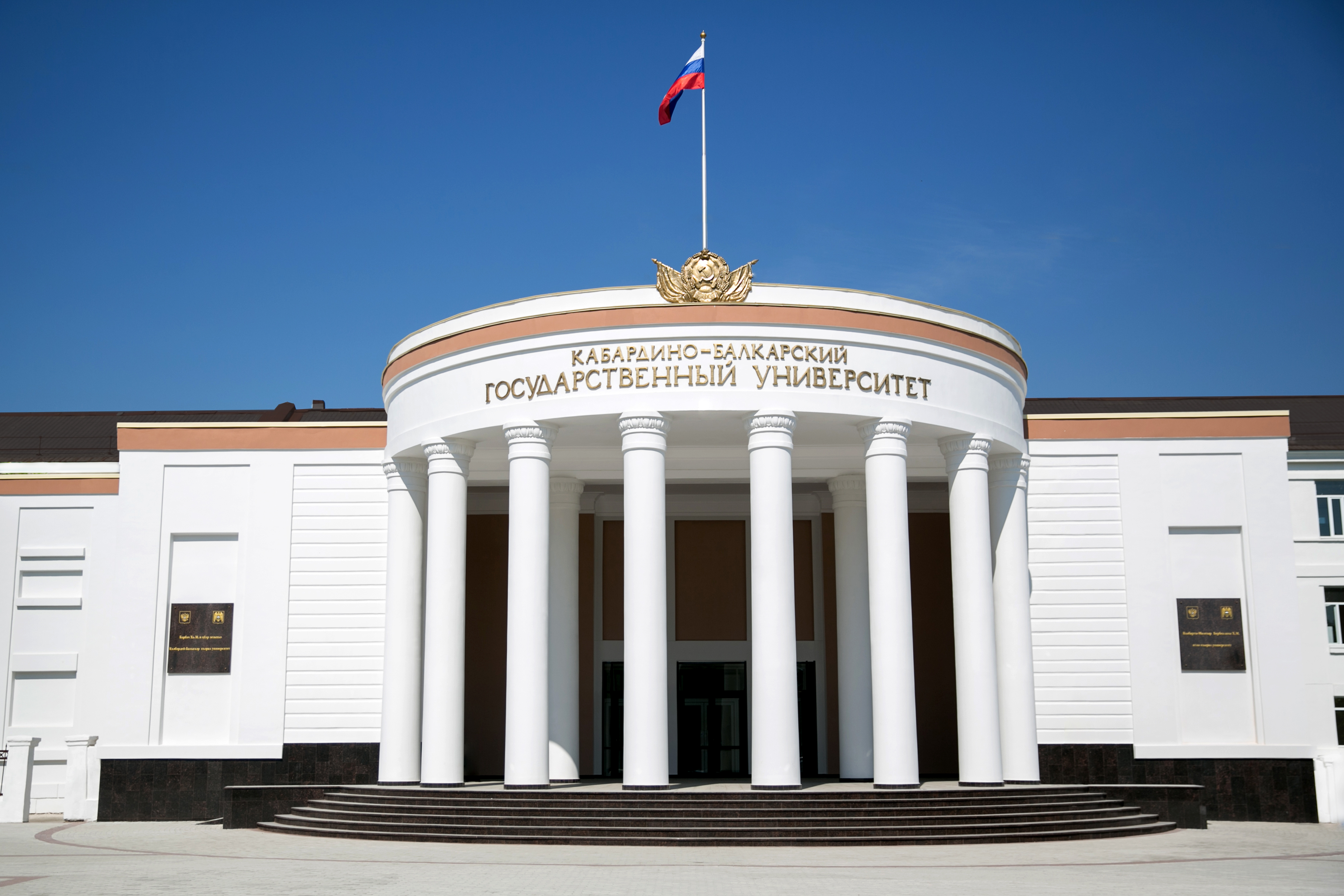
- Type: Public
- Established: 1957
- Chairman: laik saifi
- Rector: Altudov Yuri
- Principal: governmental university
- Students: 15,000
- Location: Ulitsa Chernyshevskogo, 173, Nalchik, Kabardino-Balkaria, Active, 360004, Russia; 43.49806°N 43.61889°E
- Language: Russian language, english language
- Website: kbsu.ru

Kabardino-Balkarian State University (KBSU); Russian: Кабардино-Балкарский государственный университет имени Х. М. Бербекова Kabardino_Balkarskii gosudarstvennii universitet imeni H. M. Berbekova, often abbreviated КБГУ, KBSU) is a coeducational and public research university located in Nalchik, Kabardino-Balkaria, Russia. It was founded on April 5, 1957. The university is recognized by the Ministry of Science and Higher Education of the Russian Federation. It is one of the largest universities in the North Caucasus. Its rector is Altudov Y.K. The university library has more than 30% of the seats equipped with high-tech computer systems.

== History ==
In 1924, the Lenin Training Campus (LUG) was opened in Nalchik, which was located in a building later transferred to the medical faculty. In 1925, a medical school was opened there, as well as courses for tractor drivers, an agricultural school, and a political school.

In 1931, on the basis of LUG, the Pedagogical Faculty began work. LUG reorganized into the Lenin party educational campus, which was disbanded in 1936.

On July 7, 1932, at the request of the Kabardino-Balkarian Regional Communist Party Committee, the Pedagogical Institute was opened.

On the basis of the pedagogical institute in 1957, Kabardino-Balkarian State University was formed.

In accordance with the order of the Minister of Higher and Secondary Education of the USSR V. B. Elyutin, on September 1, 1957, Kabardino-Balkarian State University began its work in 4 faculties:

- Historical and philological
- Physical and mathematical
- Civil engineering
- Agricultural

In total, there were 21 departments that trained not only school teachers, including foreign language teachers, but also civil engineers and educational agronomists.

For achievements in the training of qualified specialists and the development of scientific research, Kabardino-Balkarian State University was awarded the Order of Friendship of Peoples in 1982. On December 30, 1996, by the Decree of the President of the KBR, it was named after his first rector Khatuta Mutovich Berbekov.

== Faculties ==
- Higher School of International Education
- Institute of Architecture, Construction and Design
- Social and Humanitarian Institute
- Institute of Pedagogy, Psychology and Physical Culture and Sports Education
- Institute of Law, Economics and Finance
- Institute of Physics and Mathematics
- Institute of Chemistry and Biology
- Institute of Continuing Education and Professional Training in Dentistry
