= Baksansky District =

Baksansky District Баксанский район (Russian)
- District

Other transcription(s)
  - Kabardian: Бэхъсэн къедзыгъуэ
  - Karachay-Balkar: Бахсан район
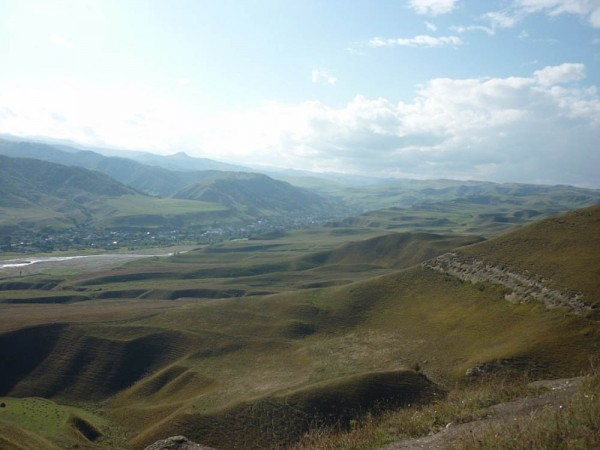
- Landscape near the selo of Verkhny Kurkuzhin in Baksansky District
- Location of Baksansky District in the Kabardino-Balkarian Republic
- Coordinates: 43°41′N 43°32′E
- Country: Russia
- Federal subject: Kabardino-Balkarian Republic
- Established: 1921
- Administrative center: Baksan

Area
  - Total: 829.58 km^{2} (320.30 sq mi)

Population (2010 Census)
  - Total: 60,970
  - Density: 73.50/km^{2} (190.4/sq mi)
  - Urban: 0%
  - Rural: 100%

Administrative structure
  - Inhabited localities: 13 rural localities

Municipal structure
  - Municipally incorporated as: Baksansky Municipal District
  - Municipal divisions: 0 urban settlements, 13 rural settlements
- Time zone: UTC+3 (MSK)
- OKTMO ID: 83610000
- Website: http://ba.adm-kbr.ru

Population of Baksansky District
- 2010 Census: 60,970
- 2002 Census: 114,888
- 1989 Census: 96,259
- 1979 Census: 86,171

Baksansky District (Russian: Бакса́нский райо́н; Kabardian: Бэхъсэн къедзыгъуэ; Karachay-Balkar: Бахсан район, Baxsan rayon) is an administrative and a municipal district (raion), one of the ten in the Kabardino-Balkarian Republic, Russia. It is located in the north of the republic. The area of the district is 829.58 square kilometers (320.30 sq mi). Its administrative center is the town of Baksan (which is not administratively a part of the district). As of the 2010 Census, the total population of the district was 60,970.

== Administrative and municipal status ==
Within the framework of administrative divisions, Baksansky District is one of the ten in the Kabardino-Balkarian Republic and has administrative jurisdiction over all of its thirteen rural localities. The town of Baksan serves as its administrative center, despite being incorporated separately as a town of republic significance—an administrative unit with the status equal to that of the districts.

As a municipal division, the district is incorporated as Baksansky Municipal District. Its thirteen rural localities are incorporated into thirteen rural settlements within the municipal district. The town of republic significance of Baksan is incorporated separately from the district as Baksan Urban Okrug, but serves as the administrative center of the municipal district as well.
