= Baksan (town) =

Town in the Kabardino-Balkarian Republic, Russia

Baksan Баксан
- Town

Other transcription(s)
  - Kabardian: Бэхъсэн
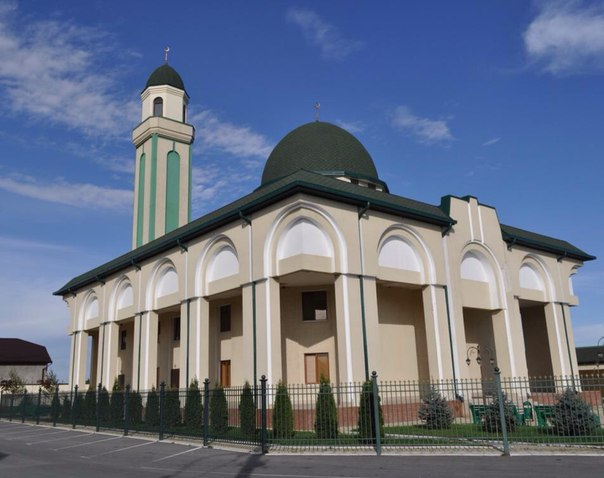
- Central Mosque of Baksan

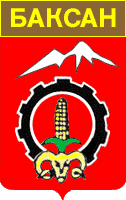
- Coat of arms
- Interactive map of Baksan
- Location of Baksan Baksan (Kabardino-Balkaria)
- Coordinates: 43°40′57″N 43°32′02″E
- Country: Russia
- Federal subject: Kabardino-Balkaria
- Founded: 1822
- Town status since: 1967
- Elevation: 450 m (1,480 ft)

Population (2010 Census)
  - Total: 36,860
  - Estimate (2024): 40,010 (+8.5%)

Administrative status
  - Subordinated to: town of republic significance of Baksan
  - Capital of: Baksansky District, town of republic significance of Baksan

Municipal status
  - Urban okrug: Baksan Urban Okrug
  - Capital of: Baksansky Municipal District, Baksan Urban Okrug
- Time zone: UTC+3 (MSK)
- Postal codes: 361530–361536, 361538
- Dialing code: +7 86634
- OKTMO ID: 83703000001
- Website: www.gb.adm-kbr.ru

Baksan (Russian: Бакса́н; Kabardian: Бэхъсэн) is a town in the Kabardino-Balkarian Republic, Russia, located 24 kilometers (15 mi) northwest of Nalchik on the left bank of the Baksan River (Terek's basin). Population: 60,445 (2021 census); 36,860 (2010 census); 35,805 (2002 census); 28,767 (1989 Soviet census).

== History ==
It was founded in 1822 as a Russian military settlement. In the 1860s, the Kabarda settlement of Kuchmazukino was founded to the east of Baksan; it was renamed Staraya Krepost in 1920. In 1891, to the west of the settlement, the selo of Baksan was founded. Baksan and Staraya Krepost were merged in 1960. Urban-type settlement status was granted to it in 1965; town status was granted in 1967.

== Administrative and municipal status ==
Within the framework of administrative divisions, Baksan serves as the administrative center of Baksansky District, even though it is not a part of it. As an administrative division, it is, together with one rural locality (the selo of Dygulybgey), incorporated separately as the town of republic significance of Baksan—an administrative unit with the status equal to that of the districts. As a municipal division, the town of republic significance of Baksan is incorporated as Baksan Urban Okrug.

== Demographics ==
In 2021, population included:

- Kabardians (93.4%)
- Russians (3.7%)
- Cherkess (2.2%)
- Others (0.7%)

== Notable people ==
- Sultan Sosnaliyev, ethnic Kabardian who served as a general for Abkhazia
