= Parliament of the Kabardino-Balkarian Republic =

Regional parliament of Kabardino-Balkaria, Russia

Parliament of the Karbardino-Balkarian Republic Парламент Кабардино-Балкарской Республики
- 7th legislature

Type
- Type: Unicameral

Leadership
- Chairwoman: Tatyana Egorova, United Russia since 18 September 2014

Structure
- Seats: 70
- Political groups: United Russia (50) CPRF (9); SRZP (7); LDPR (2) Greens (2)

Elections
- Voting system: Proportional
- Last election: 8 September 2024
- Next election: 2029

Meeting place
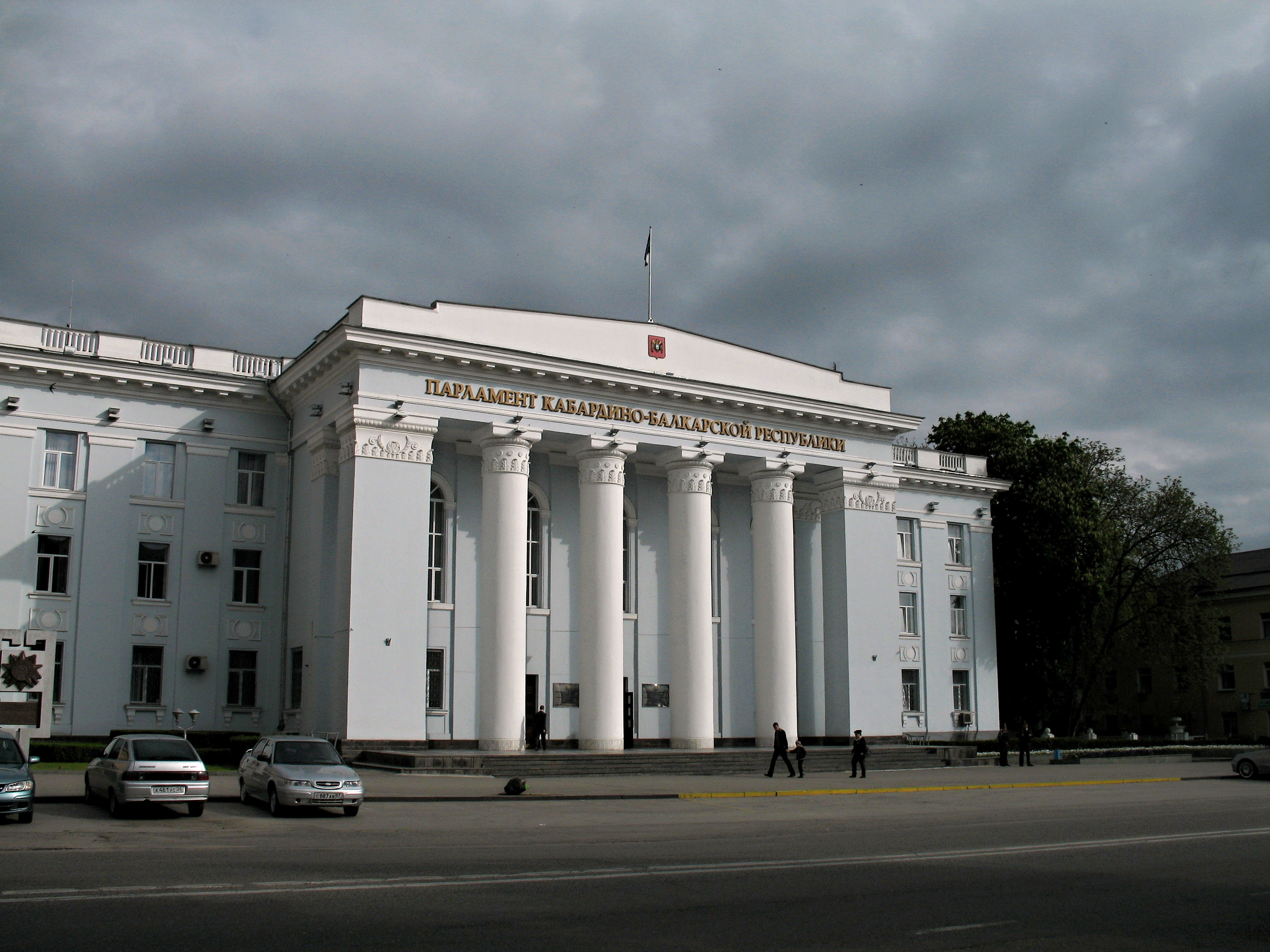

Website
- parlament.kbr.ru

The Parliament of the Kabardino-Balkarian Republic (Russian: Парламент Кабардино-Балкарской Республики, romanized: Parlament Kabardino-Balkarskoy Respubliki) is the regional parliament of Kabardino-Balkaria, a federal subject of Russia. A total of 70 deputies are elected for five-year terms.

== Elections ==
=== 2019 ===
Party	Kabardino-Balkarian Parliamentary Leader	%	Seats
United Russia	Afashagov Mikhail Galimovich	65.85	50
Communist Party of the Russian Federation	Pashtov Boris Sultanovich	12.84	9
A Just Russia	Kebekov Vladimir Safarbievich	10.35	7
Liberal Democratic Party of Russia	Bezgodko Vladimir Fedorovich	5.10	2
The Greens	Shkhagapsoev Safarbiy Khasanbievich	5.07	2
Registered voters/turnout	67.23		

=== 2024 ===
Party	Kabardino-Balkarian Parliamentary Leader	%	Seats
United Russia	Afashagov Mikhail Galimovich	65.71	50
Communist Party of the Russian Federation	Boris Pashtov	12.90	9
A Just Russia - For Truth	Vladimir Kebekov	10.38	7
Liberal Democratic Party of Russia	Bezgodko Vladimir Fedorovich	5.08	2
The Greens	Shkhagapsoev Safarbiy Khasanbievich	5.07	2
New People	Zaur Babayev	0.75	0
Registered voters/turnout	73.73		

== List of deputies ==
As of 26 December 2019

- Adib Abregov — United Russia
- Mihail Afashagov — United Russia
- Aslan Afaunov — United Russia
- Muradin Ahmatov — United Russia
- Aslan Altuev — Russian Ecological Party "The Greens"
- Fatimat Amshokova — United Russia
- Aslan Apazhev — United Russia
- Zaur Apshev — United Russia
- Svetlana Arisheva — United Russia
- Astemir Ashabokov — Communist Party of the Russian Federation
- Dalhat Bajdaev — Communist Party of the Russian Federation
- Salih Bajdaev — United Russia
- Arsen Baragunov — United Russia
- Ljudmila Bechelova — United Russia
- Aslan Bekizhev — A Just Russia
- Vladimir Berdjuzha — United Russia
- Timur Berov — Liberal Democratic Party of Russia
- Artur Beshtoev — United Russia
- Vladimir Bezgod'ko — Liberal Democratic Party of Russia
- Raneta Bzhahova — United Russia
- Kasbolat Dzamihov — Communist Party of the Russian Federation
- Tat'jana Egorova — United Russia
- Nina Emuzova — United Russia
- Ahmed Esenkulov — United Russia
- Marita Halishhova — United Russia
- Liza Hasaitova — Communist Party of the Russian Federation
- Arsen Haupshev — United Russia
- Naur Hibiev — United Russia
- Dzhambulat Jerkenov — United Russia
- Marat Kalmykov — A Just Russia
- Elena Kansaeva — United Russia
- Tat'jana Kanunnikova — United Russia
- Murat Kardanov — United Russia
- Muradin Kardanov — Communist Party of the Russian Federation
- Sergej Karnysh —United Russia
- Al'bert Kazdohov — United Russia
- Husejn Kazharov — United Russia
- Vladimir Kebekov — A Just Russia
- Nadezhda Kireeva — United Russia
- Ol'ga Korotkih — United Russia
- Artur Kozhokov — United Russia
- Mihail Krivko — United Russia
- Muhamed Kudaliev — United Russia
- Zaurbek Kumalov — Communist Party of the Russian Federation
- Boris Mal'bahov — United Russia
- Konstantin Mamberger — Communist Party of the Russian Federation
- Alihan Mechukaev — United Russia
- Alisoltan Nastaev — A Just Russia
- Dmitrij Parafilov — United Russia
- Boris Pashtov — Communist Party of the Russian Federation
- Ljudmila Peshkova — United Russia
- Roman Ponomarenko — United Russia
- Viktor Popov — Communist Party of the Russian Federation
- Mihail Prytkov — United Russia
- Anatolij Rahaev — United Russia
- Vladimir Sekrekov — A Just Russia
- Safarbij Shhagapsoev — Russian Ecological Party "The Greens"
- Beslan Shogenov — United Russia
- Artur Tekushev — United Russia
- Timur Thagalegov — United Russia
- Adal'bi Tleuzhev — United Russia
- Ruslan Tokov — A Just Russia
- Husein Tumenov — United Russia
- Charim Vindizhev — United Russia
- Aleksej Vojtov — A Just Russia
- Jel'dar Zalihanov — United Russia
- Oleg Zalin — United Russia
- Salim Zhanataev — United Russia
