= Kabardian Civil War (1562–1567) =

Civil feudal strife in Kabardia between 1562 and 1567

- Part of Civil Wars in Kabardia
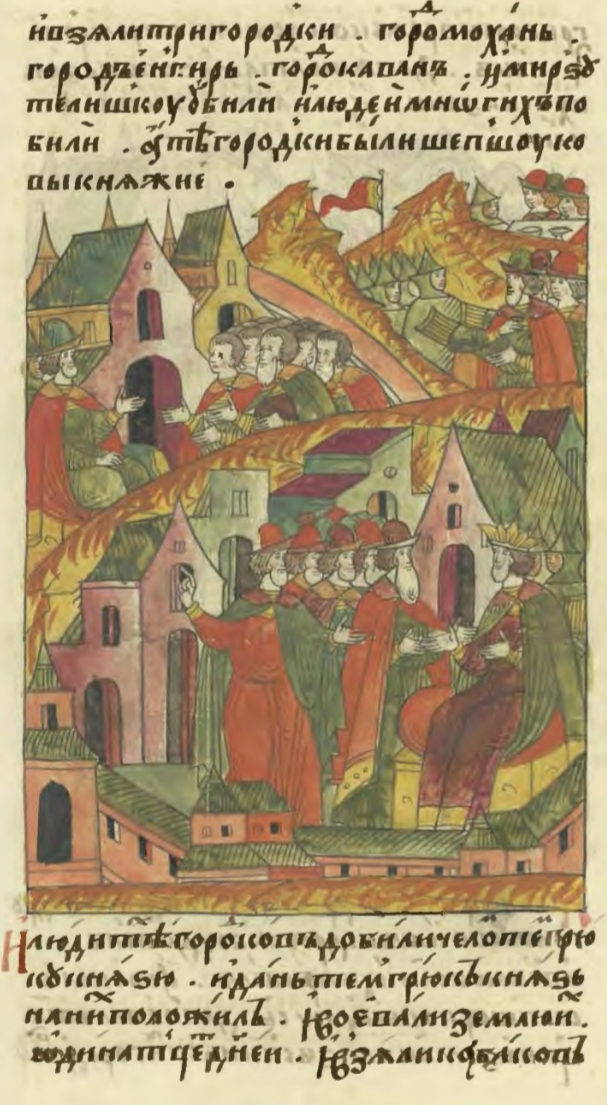
- Subjugation of Pro-Crimean princes in Kabardia by Temruqo Yidar
Date	December 1562-1567
Location	Kabardia
Result	Yidarey Faction's victory: Temruqo solidifies power
Territorial changes	Yidarey Principality annexes upper Kuban, Kuma, Pyatigorye, and the Satey plain

Belligerents
Principality of Yidarey (Lesser Kabardia); Talostaney (Lesser Kabardia); Supported by: Tsardom of Russia	Principality of Qeytuqey; Supported by: Lesser Nogai Horde; Tarki Shamkhalate

Commanders and leaders
Temruqo the Brave; Mamstruk Temruqo; Domanuk Temruqo; Tepsaruqo Talostan; Ivan Dashkov; Grigory Pleshcheyev; Matvey Rzhevsky; Grigory Vrazhsky	Pshiapshoqo Qeytuqo; Aslanbech I Qeytuqo; Jansokh Qeytuqo; Ghazi ibn Urak; Buday I †; Surkhai I †

The Kabardian Civil War (1562–1567) was a major internal succession struggle and geopolitical conflict fought in Kabardia between opposing princely factions vying for centralization and regional hegemony. The war was characterized by a bitter dynastic rivalry between the supreme prince, Temruqo the Brave (Yidar family), and the rival princely coalition led by the sons of Qeytuqo, including Aslanbech and Pshiapshoqo Qeytuqo.

Because of its strategic location in the North Caucasus, the internal conflict quickly escalated into a wider proxy theater for competing regional empires. Temruqo sought to centralize political authority over the fragmented Kabardian principalities by establishing a firm military alliance with Russia, a bond cemented in August 1561 by the marriage of Ivan the Terrible to Temruqo's daughter, Maria Temryukovna. In response, the anti-centralization Qeytuqo faction formed counter-alliances with hostile regional powers, including the Crimean Khanate, the Lesser Nogai Horde under Ghazi ibn Urak, and the Shamkhalate of Kumukh.

The conflict began in earnest in 1562 when a massive anti-Idar coalition forced Temruqo to flee to Astrakhan. Ivan the Terrible swiftly intervened, dispatching hundreds of Russian musketeers and Cossacks to reinstate his father-in-law. Over the next five years, Russian expeditionary forces repeatedly campaigned in Kabardia to suppress the dissident princes. The war reached its climax in 1567 when Shamkhal Buday I invaded Kabardia to support the Qeytuqo faction. The ensuing major battle ended in a decisive victory for Temruqo; both Buday I and his brother were killed in the fighting, severely weakening the Shamkhalate's capacity for future intervention.

The conclusion of the civil war in 1567 solidified Temruqo's position as supreme prince, temporarily checked Crimean and Ottoman ambitions in the basin, and directly paved the way for the construction of the first Russian fort on the Terek River, permanently altering the balance of power in the northeastern Caucasus.

== Background ==
In the early 16th century, Temruqo the Brave entered into conflict with the sons of Qeytuqo, including Aslanbech and Pshiapshoqo Qeytuqo. As a result of this struggle, Temruqo was forced to migrate with his family to Lesser Kabardia. The conflict is generally considered to have stemmed from a dynastic dispute over the title of supreme prince of Kabardia. After the death of Prince Jilakhstan in the 1550s, Temruqo became the senior prince of Lesser Kabardia, and the territory under his control became known as “Yidarey”.

Upon becoming Grand Prince of Kabardia in the 1550s, Temruqo faced opposition from several Kabardian princes who sought the position for themselves.

Temruqo strengthened his ties with Russia after Ivan IV's marriage in August 1561 to Temruqo's daughter Maria Temryukovna. Ivan the Terrible's marriage had political significance for both Kabardia and Russia, primarily contributing to the weakening of Crimea's position in the North Caucasus. As a response in 1562, Ghazi ibn Urak married the daughter of Kabardian Prince Pshiapshoqo, who was an enemy of Temruqo.

Rumors of the tsar's marriage to Temruqo's daughter quickly spread among other Kabardian rulers, who "taught them to be obedient and to pay tribute to him, and Temruqo submitted to the prince's will in every way." It is quite clear that by marrying his daughter to Ivan IV, Temruqo was primarily seeking to centralize power in Kabarda. And he was not mistaken: the position of the supreme prince was noticeably strengthened.

== History ==
=== 1562 ===
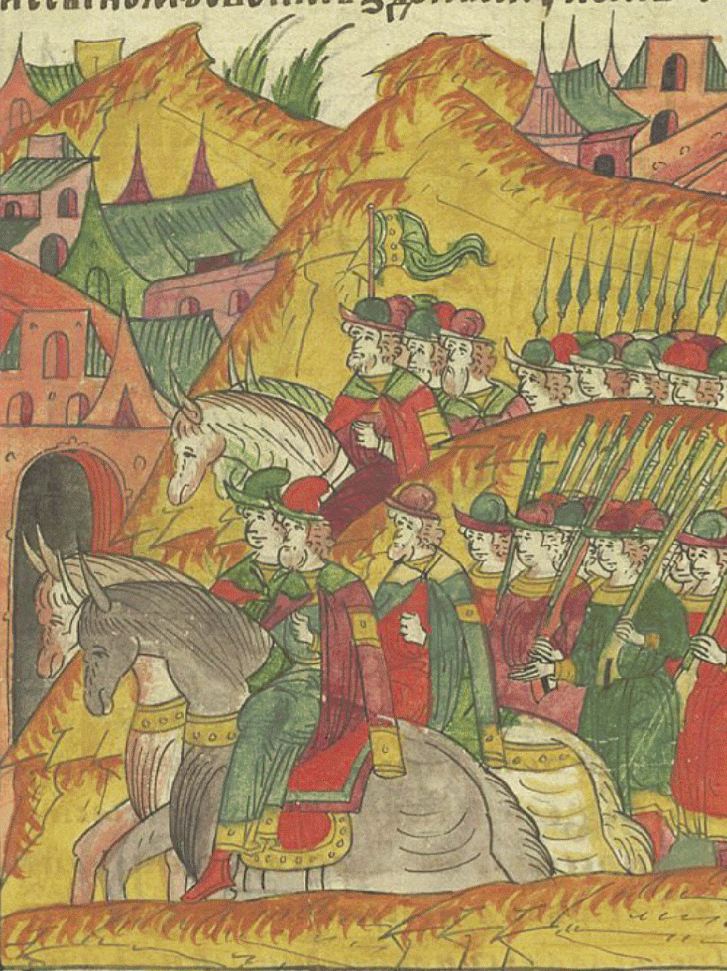
Grigory Semenovich Pleshcheev (on the white horse in the top row) together with Temruqo Yidar (on the black horse in the bottom row)

Although Temruqo initially achieved several successes, opposition among the Kabardian princes strengthened, and in 1562 he was forced to flee Kabardia with his sons and seek refuge in Astrakhan. Ivan the Terrible soon intervened in the conflict. Temruqo received military assistance from Astrakhan consisting of approximately 500 musketeers and 500 Cossacks, a considerable force by the standards of sixteenth-century Kabardia. The fight with Qeytuqo's sons ended with Temruqo's victory: on October 3, 1562, Pleshcheyev returned to Moscow with a report of the defeat of Pshiapshoqo's forces after an 11-day campaign.

The Facial Chronicle describes the campaign as follows:

“And Prince Temruqo and his son Domanuk-Mirza came to Cherkasy on December 6, and Grigory came to Cherkasy with them, and with him the head of the Streltsy Grigory Vrazhsky, and with them 500 Streltsy people and five Cossack atamans with Cossacks, and the Cossacks with them 500 people. And Temruqo and the sovereign's people brought enmity to their enemies and brought them to their will, and fought against the Shepshukov uluses and fought against the Tatar lands near the Skinnye towns, and took three towns: the town of Mokhan, the town of Engir, the town of Kavan, and killed Mirza Telishka and massacred their people. And those towns belonged to the Shepshukov princes, and the people of those towns bowed to Prince Temruqo, and Prince Temruqo imposed tribute on them."

=== 1565 ===
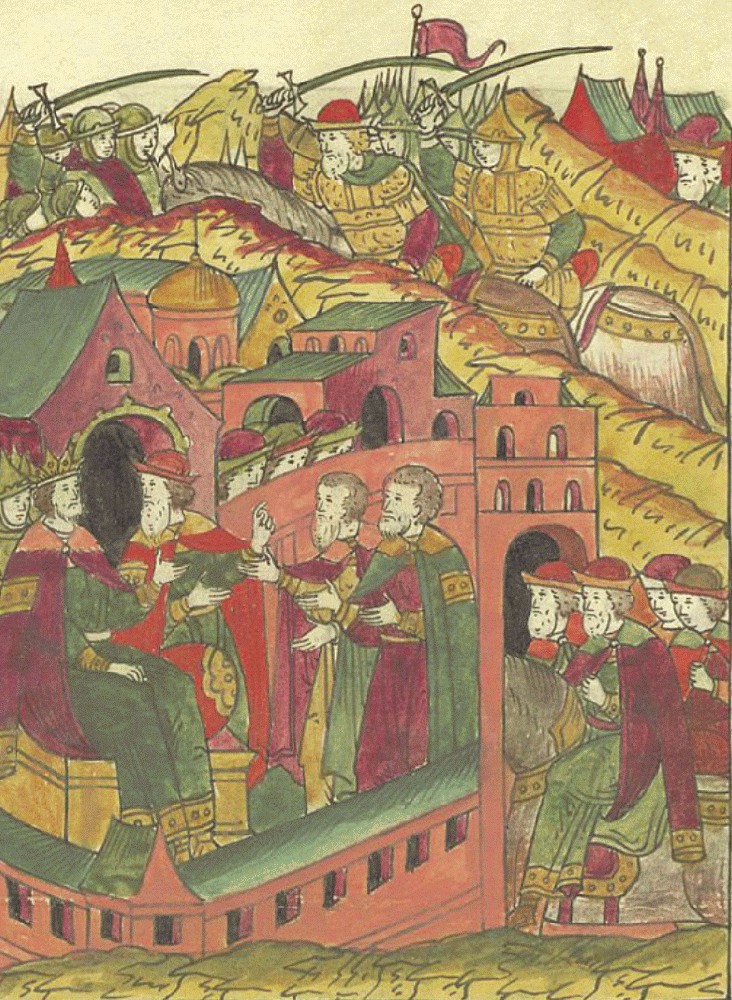
Ivan Dashkov tells Tsar about his campaign in Kabardia

In June 1565, Temruqo's son, Mamstruk, arrived in Moscow, heading to Alexandrov Sloboda upon his arrival, as ordered by the tsar. It was at that time that the Ottoman Empire and Crimean Khanate were planning to seize Astrakhan and the Middle and Lower Volga regions, intending to build their own fortresses there and prevent Russia from gaining a foothold on the Terek. Mamstruk appealed to Ivan IV that many Kabardian princes were again disobedient to Temruqo and that he needed military assistance. In September 1565, the tsar sent a detachment of warriors and Cossacks led by Ivan Dashkov and Matvey Rzhevsky to Kabardia.

Russia's support for Temruqo's desire to end the civil strife bore fruit. Ivan Dashkov and Matvey Rzhevsky "and their comrades" remained in Kabarda for several months, as Russian sources report: "and in the Circassian regions, Shapshukov's taverns fought with the brothers, and they took many prisoners and lives." Dashkov and Rzhevsky with their army had to confront not only Pshiapshoqo but all the opposing Kabardian Princes.

"And the Circassian princes... many gathered, came against Prince Ivan Dashkov and Matvey the clerk with his comrades and did business with them.”

Despite these setbacks, the Qeytuqo faction remained influential. In 1566 Temruqo requested that Ivan IV build a fortress on the Terek River, warning that the Qeytuqo family, led by Aslanbech and Pshiapshoqo, continued to pose a serious threat. The Muscovite tsar approved the request and in February 1567 dispatched laborers and equipment to Kabardia for the construction of the fort.

=== 1567 ===
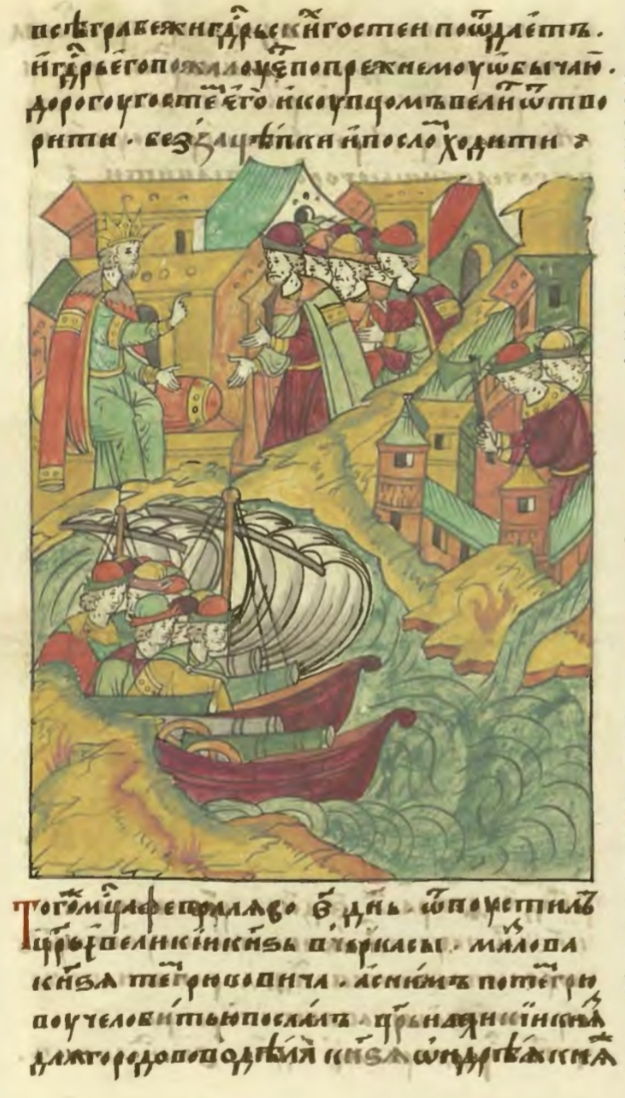
Ivan the Terrible sends Mazlov and Ulgairuk to Kabardia together with resources to build Terki Fortress

In 1567, the shamkhal Buday I intervened in the ongoing feudal conflict within Kabardia between the senior prince Temruqo Idar and the rival claimant Pshiapshoqo Qeytuqo. Taking advantage of this internal division, Buday aligned himself with Qeytuqo and marched into Kabardian territory with a military detachment. His intervention formed part of the broader struggle for influence in the northeastern Caucasus, where regional rulers frequently involved themselves in the dynastic disputes of neighboring polities.

A major battle subsequently took place between the faction of rulers led by Temruqo the Brave and the coalition supporting Pshiapshoqo Qeytuqo. In addition to the forces of the shamkhal, the ruler of Lesser Nogai, Ghazi ibn Urak, joined Qeytuqo's side. The confrontation represented not only an internal Kabardian succession struggle but also a wider contest between regional powers seeking to influence Kabardian affairs. The battle ended in a decisive victory for Temruqo Idar. Shamkhal Buday was killed during the fighting, along with his brother. His death marked a significant setback for the Shamkhalate's involvement in Kabardian politics and weakened its immediate capacity to shape events in the region through direct military intervention.

Further evidence of losses sustained by the ruling house of the Shamkhalate during this period is preserved in epigraphic material from the cemetery of the Shamkhal clan in Gazi-Kumukh. Tombstone inscriptions record the deaths of two additional sons of Amal-Muhammad—Buday-shamkhal and Surkhai—who are described as having been killed in "battle with the infidels" in 974 AH (1566–1567). This date corresponds chronologically with the construction of the first Russian fortress on the Terek River, an event that significantly altered the balance of power in the region. According to some researchers, these individuals likely died in attempts to hinder or resist the establishment of the Russian fortifications.

After the conflict, Temruqo eventually annexed the lands owned by Pshiapshoqo Qeytuqo, which were located in the Greater Kabardia region within the state, namely, these lands were Upper Kuban, Kuma, Pyatigorye, and the Satey plain, stretching as far as the Chegem river.

== Sources ==
- Yaşar, Murat (2022). The North Caucasus Borderland: Between Muscovy and the Ottoman Empire, 1555–1605 (PDF). Edinburgh Studies on the Ottoman Empire. Edinburgh: Edinburgh University Press. ISBN 9781474498692.
- Kardanov, Ch. E. (2016). Князья Кабарды [Princes of Kabarda] (in Russian). Nalchik: Izdatel'stvo M. i V. Kotlyarovykh. ISBN 978-5-93680-971-2.
