= Withdrawal through Kabardian road =

- Part of the Crimean–Circassian Wars and Russo-Turkish War (1568–1570)
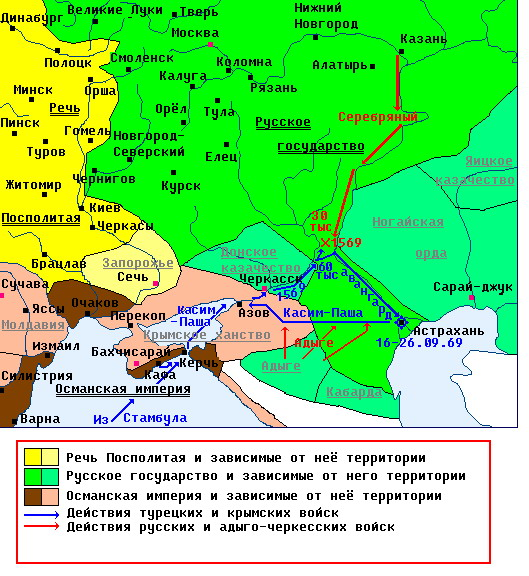
- Map of Russo-Turkish War (1568–1570) showing the route and retreat of Turkish army. The attacks by the Circassians are indicated by red arrows.
Date	1569
Location	Kabardian/Mozhar road (modern day Kuma-Manych Depression)
Result	Circassian victory

Belligerents
Kabardia (East Circassia); Greben Cossacks	Ottoman Empire; Crimean Khanate; Lesser Nogai Horde

Commanders and leaders
Temruqo the Brave; Domanuk Temruqo	(Ottoman Empire) Çerkes Kasım Pasha (Ottoman Empire) Pila Pasha †; Devlet I Giray; Ghazi ibn Urak

Strength
Unknown	(Ottoman Empire) 28,000–35,000 or less than 15,000 troops Unknown

Casualties and losses
Unknown	(Ottoman Empire) 26,000 (Note: Per Taranowski)–34,000 (Note: Per Bakunin); Other estimates: 3/4 of the army Several thousands

The Withdrawal through the Kabardian road, also known as Mozhar road, was the return march of the Ottoman-Crimean army following the unsuccessful 1569 Astrakhan campaign. After abandoning the siege of Astrakhan, the army withdrew westward along a route known as the Kabardian Road, suffering severe losses from famine, thirst, disease and harsh weather. During the march, the exhausted troops were also attacked by Circassian forces, including Kabardian cavalry led by Temruqo the Brave and his sons. Contemporary accounts differed over the reasons for the route chosen by Devlet I Giray, with some accusing the khan of deliberately leading the Ottoman army through inhospitable terrain.

== Background ==
In 1550, Ottoman Sultan Suleiman the Magnificent sent a letter to Ismail Bey, the Khan of the Nogai Horde, criticizing Ivan the Terrible for acting arbitrarily in areas that according to Turkish interpretations belonged to their sphere of influence, as well as for disrespectful behavior towards Muslims. The Tsar learned of the letter's contents through Ismail. Although Ivan did not abandon the conquest of Kazan, he took some of the concerns raised in the letter into account. He was unwilling to wage war against the Ottoman Empire and was careful not to provoke the Turks. He ordered the release of any Turks who might have been captured during military operations against the Tatars. Correspondingly, the Ottoman leadership refrained from supporting the Crimean Khan in his warfare, and in Istanbul, there was no real perceived need for hostilities.

Although Russia's conquest of Kazan had been met in Istanbul mostly with a shrug, the conquest of Astrakhan, the establishment of alliance relations with neighboring peoples, and the construction of a new fortress in the vicinity were clear signs of Russia advancing into the Ottoman sphere of influence. Russia's military presence also disrupted transport and communication links. A portion of Muslim pilgrims traveled to Mecca via the route north and east of the Black Sea through Azov and the Caucasus. However, reports began reaching Istanbul that pilgrims could no longer travel safely through areas containing Russian fortresses and garrisons. The Ottoman Empire, which considered itself the protector of the Muslim faith in its domains, took these complaints seriously. Similar complaints came from merchants as well. Although Russia itself was keen to trade with the Ottomans, they now appeared unwilling to grant passage rights in the Astrakhan region to Turkish merchants traveling east. Perhaps the Turks' greatest concern, however, was the military threat inherent in the Russian presence, as Astrakhan offered an excellent base for a potential advance closer to the Ottoman Empire.

Russia's allies in the region were already a practical threat to the Turks. The Ottoman-controlled Azov region at the mouth of the Don came under attack from the Don and Dnieper Cossacks. The Kabardian prince Temruqo the Brave, in turn, attacked Turkish fortresses on the eastern coast of the Black Sea. In addition, the Nogais of the Lesser Horde, who had moved to the lower reaches of the Don, began demanding the initiation of military action and the recapture of Astrakhan from the Russians. Resolving the problems through peaceful negotiations had simultaneously become more difficult. A direct channel of communication occasionally existed between the Turks and the Russians, as Moscow sent diplomats to Istanbul when necessary, but the Ottoman leadership traditionally used the leaders and diplomats of the Crimean Khanate as intermediaries in northern affairs. However, the Crimean Khan had been waging his own war against Russia since 1552 and was unwilling to act as a peaceful mediator between his ally and his traditional enemy.

As the causes accumulated, a military campaign began to look necessary. However, Istanbul waited for an opportune moment, as the main part of its army was tied up in the west, where war was being waged against the Austrian Habsburgs. Although the first thoughts of war had arisen as early as the 1550s and the first theoretical plans had been formulated by 1563, they still had to wait patiently for an opportunity, as only the eight-year truce signed in 1568 freed their troops for use elsewhere. The operation planned for the Caucasus could finally be carried out. The timing was seen as favorable in Istanbul, as Ivan's forces were tied up in the Livonian War in the north, which he had initiated in 1558.

== Prelude ==
On September 20, 1569, Astrakhan was placed under siege. Approximately 30,000 workers were gathered from the populations of Kaffa, Balaklava, Mangup, and Taman to be employed in the canal excavation work, and the digging work began in November 1569. The progressively worsening seasonal conditions began to increase the tendency to desert among the excavation workers. Issues such as wages not being paid on time also started to arise. After a while, the reluctance that developed among the workers spread to the soldiers besieging the city as well, and rebellions broke out from time to time. Upon these negative developments, the excavation activities were halted with Kazim Pasha's proposal and the approval of the Grand Vizier and the Sultan. The Crimean Khanate, which was supposed to provide support for this operation, withdrew its support at the last minute due to fears spread by the Russians that the Ottoman Empire was opposed to Crimean autonomy and that an Ottoman success in this campaign could threaten this autonomy, as well as with the statement that the campaigning season had passed.

== Retreat ==
On 26 September, the Ottoman-Crimean forces burned their camp at Astrakhan, abandoned the siege of the city and began moving westward towards an area known as White Lake, approximately 60 versts away.

During their withdrawal from Astrakhan, the Crimean-Turkish army was met by Çavuş Ahmed and the ambassador Andrey Taranowski. Sultan Selim II ordered Çerkes Kasım Pasha to "establish a city on the old settlement and winter there, and not to march near Astrakhan, and to seek peace with the Astrakhan voivodes." He also ordered that the allied Tatars and Nogais be given generous payments "based on their judgment", and that Devlet I Giray and all the Crimeans be sent back to the peninsula. Separately, the khan was instructed to release the Lithuanian ambassador, who had been detained in Bakhchisarai for a long time, and not to repeat such conduct in the future. The following spring, the sultan promised to send reinforcements to Astrakhan, including Bardi Pasha with a large army and Pila Pasha, Kasım Pasha's son-in-law, who was to assist Devlet Giray in his campaign against Russia.

Later, on 1 October, Taranowski was received by Devlet Giray.

=== Disease and famine ===
Although the sultan's plan was strategically sound, it came at least two weeks too late. Kasım Pasha and Devlet Giray therefore disregarded his orders and continued the withdrawal, as attempting to enforce them risked provoking a mutiny among the troops. The march subsequently became a major disaster for the Ottoman army. According to some accounts, the losses suffered during the withdrawal greatly exceeded those sustained during the campaign itself.

As the march continued, the Crimean Khan led the Ottoman-Crimean army through arid and waterless terrain, resulting in severe shortages of water and the outbreak of famine among the troops. The route is referred to in the sources as the "Kabardian Road" or the "Mozhar Road".

The army sometimes had to march for three to five days without access to fresh water. Men and horses were reportedly forced to drink saline water to survive. The worsening conditions also intensified hostility between the Ottoman and Crimean contingents, with skirmishes breaking out over access to the few available springs.

Food shortages were equally severe. Nogai merchants reportedly made considerable profits by selling biscuits and flour to the Ottoman troops at exorbitant prices. The army also encountered numerous snakes along the route and was struck by a powerful windstorm so severe that movement became nearly impossible. Towards the end of the march, heavy rain fell for three consecutive days, followed by a sharp drop in temperature. Many soldiers subsequently froze to death near the walls of Azov.

These conditions resulted in heavy losses among both the troops and their animals. According to Taranowski, between 200 and 500 people died each day. An informant of ambassador Ivan Novosiltsev reported: "The Turkish people suffered great losses, too: their horses died, and the Turks died of hunger and poverty." Semyon Maltsev, who witnessed the returning army, recalled that he had never seen people so emaciated. Taranowski similarly stated: "I heard in Constantinople that the best people from all over the land were selected and sent to Astrakhan, but I have never seen such thin people anywhere."

=== Attacks by Circassians ===
Although the Tsar's commanders did not pursue the withdrawing army, stragglers were vulnerable to attacks by Circassians, who were allies of Muscovy at the time. In several instances, Ottoman soldiers were also attacked and robbed by their Crimean and Nogai allies. Among those killed and robbed was Kasım Pasha's son-in-law. Fearing such attacks, the Ottoman troops avoided allowing their horses to graze freely in the fields, instead keeping them near their tents and cutting grass for them beforehand.

V. B. Vilinbakhov wrote that during the withdrawal of the Ottoman-Crimean army, Kabardian cavalry forces led by Temruqo the Brave and his sons, including Domanuk, attacked the exhausted troops and inflicted considerable losses. According to his account, the Kabardians "easily routed the exhausted enemy, took rich booty and many prisoners".

== Casualties ==
The Ottoman army suffered severe losses during the campaign, with some accounts claiming that the majority of its troops perished. According to information collected by Novosiltsev in Istanbul, fewer than a quarter of the Ottoman army returned to their homeland. Not all of the sanjak troops returned, and of the 3,000 Janissaries who had taken part in the campaign, only 700 made it back, all of them reportedly ill. Upon their return to the Ottoman Empire, they openly declared that they would never participate in such a campaign again, saying that it would be better for the sultan to execute them at home. Taranowski, meanwhile, reported that only 2,000 men returned out of an army comprising 25,000 cavalrymen and 3,000 Janissaries. V. M. Bakunin gives a different figure, stating that only 1,000 survived out of an initial force of 35,000. However, modern historians such as Sergey Gromenko estimate that the Ottoman army numbered no more than 15,000 at the beginning of the campaign, with approximately three-quarters of its soldiers dying during the withdrawal.

The Crimean and Nogai contingents, accustomed to the hardships of such marches, reportedly suffered comparatively fewer casualties in the main army. They were better able to endure the shortages of food and water by eating horse meat and drinking mare's milk. Nevertheless, as the situation deteriorated during the withdrawal, the army made a final attempt to obtain provisions by sending several thousand Crimean foragers north in search of food. According to Taranowski, however, "not a single one of them returned."

== Aftermath ==
The question of why Devlet Giray led the Ottoman army through the arid steppes, dangerously close to the territories of hostile highlanders, was already being debated by contemporaries. Ivan Maltsev explicitly accused the khan of deliberately leading the Ottoman troops along the Kabardian Road through waterless terrain and towards the Circassians, writing that he "dragged them along the Kabardian road, through waterless areas, under the Circassians, deliberately tormenting them: the Tsar, sir, and the Crimean people are very reluctant to return to Astrakhan." This interpretation was later repeated by Antonio Possevino, the Jesuit ambassador of the Holy See, who reported that the Crimean Tatars "were dissatisfied with the Turks, as they believed, preparing a heavier yoke for them. Therefore, offering themselves as guides to the Turkish army, they led it by a circuitous route through endless forests and areas deprived of provisions, so that almost all of it perished from hunger and the hardships of the journey."

Taranowski offered a different account, claiming that the Nogai murza Ghazi ibn Urak, also known as Kazi, and Devlet Giray had conspired to lead the Ottoman troops along a difficult route in order to profit at their expense. According to his account, the soldiers had been promised a four-day journey through areas well supplied with water and provisions, but were instead led into a trap.

The Ottoman government also appears to have accepted the possibility of deliberate deception. During discussions in 1587 concerning another campaign against Astrakhan, Shirin Bey Ali received a letter from Istanbul accusing Devlet Giray of "leading the Muslim warriors down a false, difficult path" in an attempt to intimidate the Ottomans and "discourage them from attempting a new campaign."

However, this interpretation is contradicted by several contemporary accounts describing the assistance provided by the Crimeans and Nogais during the withdrawal. Maltsev reported that Devlet Giray "carried away many of the main Turks and foot soldiers". An informant of Novosiltsev similarly stated: "And if the Crimean Tatars and Kaziyevs [Nogais] hadn't helped those remaining Turkish people, they and the rest would have perished: and the Crimeans and Nogais were the ones providing the transportation." Even Taranowski acknowledged that the khan supplied the Ottoman troops with bread and that Crimean forces transported stragglers.

Elsewhere, Taranowski provided a more practical explanation for the choice of route, attributing it to the actions of Muscovite Cossacks: "These Moscow Cossacks... burned grass everywhere behind the Turkish and Tatar cavalry, and wherever there was even a single lake, swamp, or well, they set fires everywhere so that the army could not return." This suggests that returning along the original route across the Don had become impracticable. The possibility of encountering Muscovite forces along the Volga may also have influenced the decision to take an alternative route.

The direct route from Astrakhan to Azov did not appear particularly difficult to the Crimeans and Nogais. They drank kumis made from mare's milk and ate the meat of fallen horses, and "therefore, so they say, the losses to the Crimean Tatars were minor." For the Ottoman troops, however, the hardships continued even after their advance guard reached Azov on 23 October. According to Taranowski, those who arrived first ate so much that some died from overeating the following morning. Others boarded galleys and immediately departed for Kef, but encountered a storm on the third day, in which almost all of them reportedly drowned. The remaining stragglers continued arriving at Azov for another three days.

The failure of the campaign and the heavy losses reportedly enraged Sultan Selim II, who ordered the execution of Devlet Giray and Kasım Pasha. Having been warned in advance, the khan managed to avert the sultan's punishment through bribes and the intervention of influential figures at court, although this did little to appease the ruler's anger. Kasım Pasha remained in Kef, reportedly fearing assassination by one of the participants in the disastrous campaign. During the winter, Selim II eventually sent a çavuş to inform the khan that the campaign would not be repeated the following year. Devlet Giray reportedly made little effort to conceal his relief from the Muscovite ambassadors.

According to the 18th-century historian Seyyid Riza, one of the principal arguments against another campaign was the danger posed by constructing a canal between the Volga and Don rivers. He recorded that "intelligent and far-sighted people assured the Sultan that a channel between the Volga and Don would be detrimental to the Sublime Porte, firstly because the junction of the two rivers, increasing the turbulence of the Black and Azov Seas, would harm the flat-bottomed Turkish vessels used in the Sea of Azov due to its shallow waters; secondly, it would provide the perfidious Muscovites with an opportune opportunity to attack the shores of the Black Sea. These arguments convinced the Sultan to abandon his undertaking."

However, Ivan IV's relief proved premature. Although the Ottoman campaign had failed, and news of its outcome reportedly prompted celebrations in several European cities, the threat of renewed hostilities remained. The Ottoman Empire retained the ability to dispatch another army to Astrakhan, while Muscovy lacked the military capacity to capture Azov, let alone Kef. In the west, the Livonian War continued despite occasional truces, while the Oprichnina was destabilizing the country internally. Under these circumstances, the tsar avoided further escalation and instead took steps towards reconciliation with the Ottoman Empire.

In 1570, Novosiltsev travelled to Istanbul to restore peaceful relations between the two states. During an audience on 30 June, he assured Selim II that Kazan and Astrakhan had come under the tsar's control because of the injustices committed by their former rulers, but that the Muslims living in Muscovy faced no danger. In response, the sultan demanded that the pilgrimage route through Astrakhan be reopened and that the Terek fortress be abandoned. In the spring of 1571, a new ambassador, Andrei Ishchein-Kuzminsky, was dispatched to the Ottoman capital. In a message dated 14 March, Ivan IV declared: "Wishing to be with you henceforth in brotherhood and love, we have shown the banner of brotherly love: we have ordered the city on the Terek River, in the Kabardian land, to be razed and our people brought from there to Astrakhan; and what you wrote to us about the road, it was closed because many people were traveling in a thievish manner, committing many treasonous acts and causing losses to our city of Astrakhan; but now, for you, our brother, we have ordered the road to be opened to all travelers."

In a letter dated 8 October 1571, Selim II reiterated his demands, calling for Kazan to be handed over to the Crimean Khan and Astrakhan to the Ottoman sultan, while also demanding that Ivan IV recognize Ottoman supremacy. These demands were not fulfilled, but hostilities between the Ottoman Empire and Muscovy subsequently ceased.

== In folklore ==
Shora Nogmov on his work "History of Adyghe people" which was written based on Circassian oral history wrongly claims that this event happened after the death of Temruqo the Brave and mistakenly calls Selim II "Soliman". According to Nogmov, Kabardian princes Qaziy, Shojenuqo , and Shuzhie immediately assembled an elite army and, upon learning that Kasım Pasha had abandoned his cannons in Azov and was marching on Astrakhan with only light troops and Crimeans, where the Russians awaited them, they set out for the Volga in the autumn and, at Beloye Lake, encountered the fleeing Turks and Crimeans in disarray. The circassians easily routed the weary enemy, took rich booty and many prisoners, leaving the survivors to flee peacefully as there is a proverb: "Don't catch up with fleeing horsemen out of fear" (Kabardian: Шу щтагъэхэр куэдрэ умыху) and returned to their homeland with great glory and wealth. Nogmov claims that since then, there is a proverb among circassians: "let's go to Sotey" (Kabardian: Сотей зэхудипIалъэщ), Sotey being the Circassian name for the Steppe lying from the Volga to the Terek.
