= Circassian–Kumyk war (1552–1567) =

- Part of Circassian–Kumyk wars and Central Caucasus Crisis
Date	approx. 1552–1567
Location	Dagestan and Kabardia
Result	Circassian coalition victory

Belligerents
Kabardia; Abazinia; Besleney; Supported by: Tsardom of Russia	Shamkhalate of Tarki; Supported by: Avar Khanate; Lesser Nogai Horde; Principality of Pshiapshoqo

Commanders and leaders
Temruqo the Brave; Vartan Ortanov; Yelzheruqo Qanoqo; Lev Achba; Ivan Semyonovich	Buday I †; Surkhay I †; Muhammad Shamkhal †; Shakhmal of Richa †; Ghazi ibn Urak; Khadan Utsmi †; Pshiapshoqo Qeytuqo; Qanshau Jilakhstan †

The Circassian–Kumyk War (1552–1567) was a series of military confrontations and political struggles between the Kabardian-Circassian princes and the Shamkhalate of Tarki, supported at various times by allied Kumyk, Nogai, and other various Dagestani forces. The conflict unfolded in the broader context of shifting power dynamics in the northeastern Caucasus during the mid-16th century, a period marked by internal Kabardian rivalries and increasing intervention by the Tsardom of Russia.

The war was closely linked to feudal disputes within Kabardia, particularly the struggle for supremacy among its princely houses. External actors—including the shamkhal of Tarki and the ruler of Lesser Nogai—intervened in these disputes, transforming internal conflicts into wider regional confrontations.

Several major engagements occurred during the war, including the Battle of Kishzhibek, traditionally dated to around 1552. Russian involvement became increasingly significant after 1557, when Kabardian princes sought protection from Ivan the Terrible. Subsequent Russian military expeditions against the Shamkhalate, including the 1560 campaign against Tarki, further altered the balance of power in the region. The conflict culminated in 1567 with the death of Shamkhal Buday I during a Kabardian succession struggle, marking a turning point in relations between Kabardia, the Shamkhalate, and Russia in the North Caucasus.

== Background ==
In the 16th century, the powerful Kabardian princes, in their desire to expand their territorial borders and strengthen their influence, encountered opposition from the Shamkhalate of Tarki, whose rulers sought to push back Kabardian influence and subordinate them to their authority. The Shamkhal of Tarki regarded the Kabardian princes as his most dangerous adversaries in achieving these aims. The contradictions between the Shamkhal and the Kabardian princes were further exacerbated by the policies of the Ottoman Empire and the Crimean Khanate. The Shamkhal viewed Russia’s consistent support of Kabarda as an undesirable strengthening of his rival, which complicated relations between Tarki and Russia. In their struggle for dominance in the northeastern Caucasus, both the Kumyk and Kabardian princes attracted other regional rulers to their respective sides. The feudal groupings thus formed resorted, depending on the political situation in the Caucasus, to the assistance of neighboring states.

Upon becoming Grand Prince of Kabardia in the 1550s, Temruqo Yidar faced opposition from several Kabardian princes who sought the position of Grand Prince of Kabardia for themselves. Among them was the Kabardian prince Qanshau Jilakhstan, son of Jilakhstan, who, after leaving Kabardia, allied with the Kumyks and reportedly raided Kabardian territory multiple times each year. According to some accounts, during the summer these forces attacked hayfields and disrupted the harvest of millet—the principal agricultural crop of the Kabardians—forcing much of the population, except those mobilized for militia service, to seek refuge in the Kistin Gorge. These actions are said to have been motivated by the seizure of Qanshao's lands by the families of Bitu and Maremshao Yidar.

== History ==
=== Battle of Kishzhibek ===
During this period, Qanshao also persuaded the Avar Utsmi—identified in the sources as Khadan Utsmi—to invade Kabardia, whose population was reportedly weakened by internal strife. Khadan accepted and called upon his allies, including the Nogais and the Kumyks, assembling a united force against the Kabardians. In response, the Kabardians called upon their Trans-Kuban allies, the Abazins under Lev Achba and the Besleneys under Aldjeruqo Qanoqo.

Supreme command of the allied Kabardian forces was entrusted to Prince Aldjeruqo. As the Avar Utsmi crossed the Terek River, Prince Aldjeruqo and his advance guard met the invading force and attempted negotiations. After negotiations failed, Aldjeruqo withdrew to prepared defensive positions. Two days later, the Utsmi advanced toward the trenches, and Aldjeruqo engaged the enemy. A fierce battle followed, reportedly lasting two days. According to a legend preserved by the Ortanov family, this battle marked the Kabardians' first encounter with firearms. During the fighting, Kabardian forces reportedly heard a thunderous roar and observed smoke rising near Chegem. A volunteer named Vartan was said to have crossed the Chegem River at night and captured a matchlock from Dagestani troops. For this act, he was allegedly elevated to the rank of wark (noble).

On the third day, hostilities resumed. During the renewed fighting, the Utsmi was killed, causing confusion among his forces. According to the legend, the Kabardians exploited this disorder, launched a coordinated assault, and drove the opposing army toward the Terek River. It is claimed that only one-third of the invading force managed to escape. In the course of the battle, Prince Qanshau, described as one of the instigators of the campaign, was also killed. The battle thereafter became known as Kishzhibek, a name interpreted as meaning "salvation lies not in stone walls, but in the courage of men." The battle is commemorated in the following traditional song:

Our mowers have postponed their work until next summer, and our ripe millet has been destroyed by wild boars.

Our herdsmen galloped home on bare saddles. Our young women wept bitterly.

Our people were worn out from the constant walking into the gorges; even the iron boilers were damaged on the road.

We placed our hopes on the Chegem trenches, stood ready for battle, and our princes inspected the Kishzhibek positions.

Utsmiy was eager for battle! A bloody battle began; our two detachments of troops joined forces in the fortifications.

The blood of the enemies flowed like a wide stream, and the corpses of the slain enemies lay on the ground like a wooden bridge.

Although Circassian folklore does not provide a specific date for the battle, epigraphic evidence offers a chronological indication. In the cemetery of the Shamkhal clan in Gazi-Kumukh, a tombstone inscription commemorating Muhammad, son of Amal-Muhammad—described as "killed in battle with the infidel Circassians"—has been preserved and is dated to the month of Muharram 960 AH (27 December 1552 – 24 January 1553). A similar date appears in the epitaph of another individual from the village of Richa. Based on these inscriptions, the battle is generally dated to approximately 1552.

=== Russian intervention ===
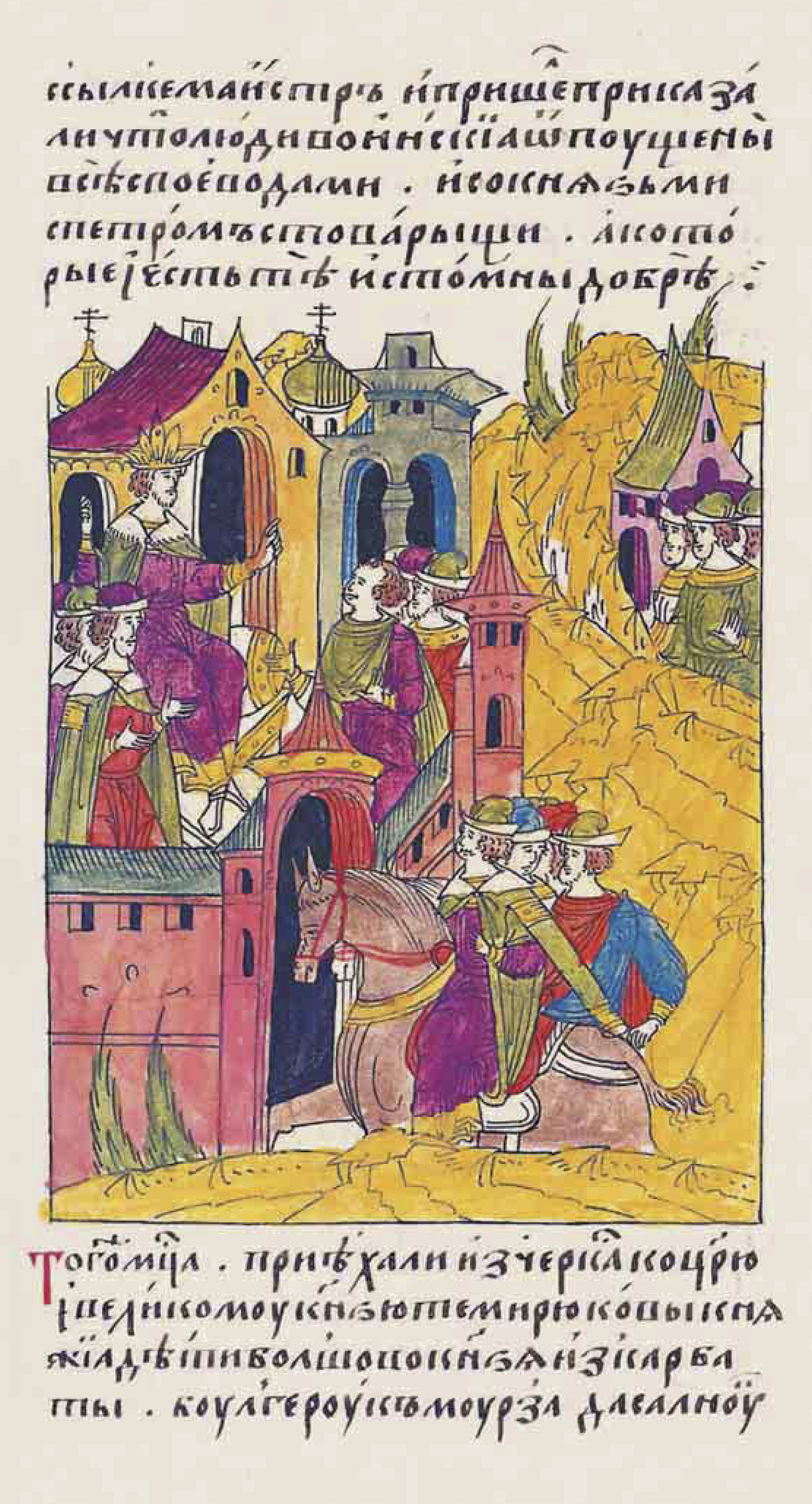
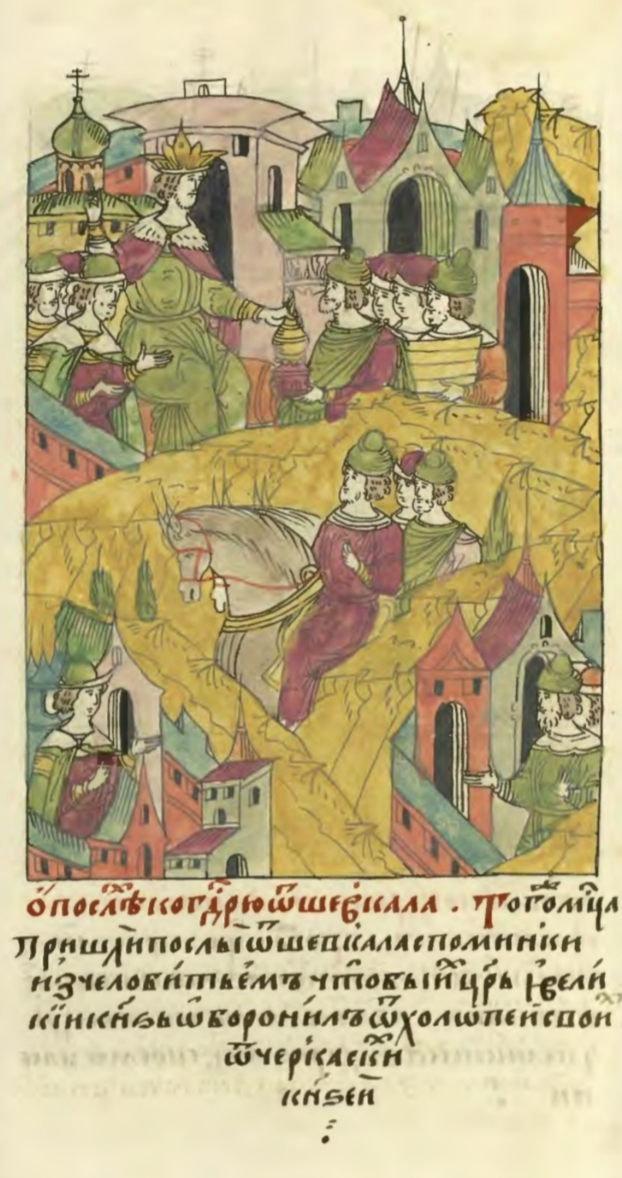
Arrival of Circassian (left) and Kumyk (right) ambassadors to Moscow

In July 1557, the Circassian mirza Kavklych Kanukov arrived at the court of Ivan the Terrible, requesting protection against the Kumyks. A similar appeal was made in October 1558 by the sons of Temruqo Idar—Bulgeruk and Saltankul. According to the sources, information about these negotiations was communicated to the Kumyks, and in 1559 a Kumyk embassy arrived at the Russian court requesting protection from Circassian princes who had entered Russian allegiance. However, complaints received from the Kabardian Circassians accused the Kumyks of conducting raids against them. In response, the Russian government dispatched a military expedition against the Shamkhalate of Tarki in support of the Kabardians.

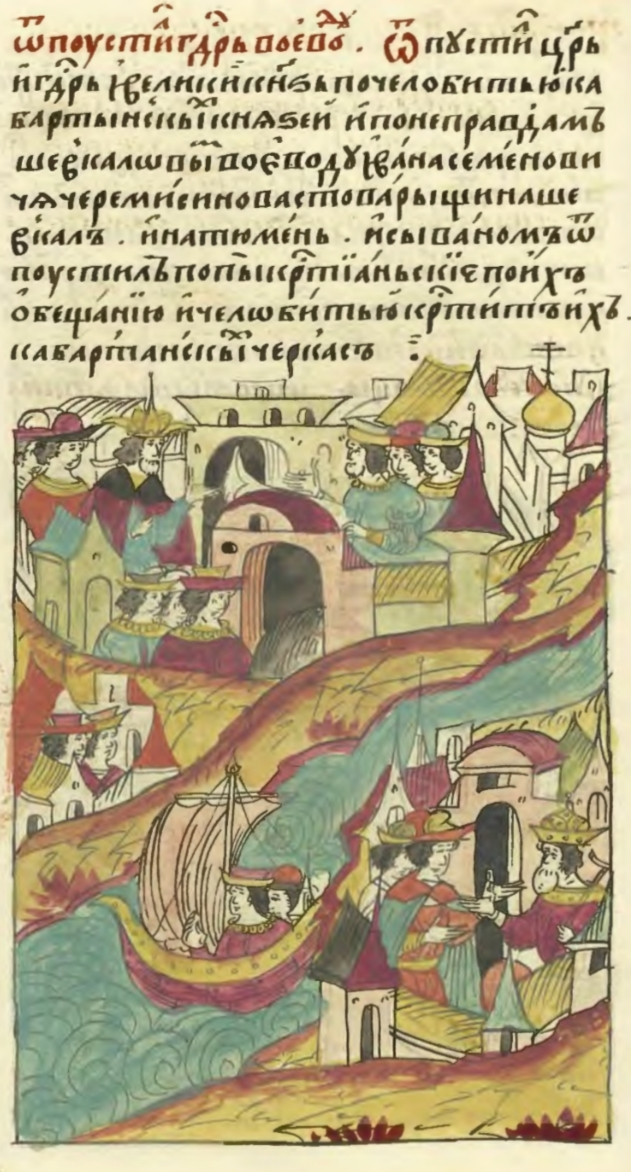
Tsar sends Ivan Cheremisinov to Dagestan to fight the Shamkhal

In the summer of 1560, an army under the voevoda I. S. Cheremisinov departed from Astrakhan by sea. Transported on vessels—likely strug boats—the force sailed along the western coast of the Caspian Sea toward Tarki, the center of the Tarki Shamkhalate. According to the chronicles, Cheremisinov's army included streltsy, Cossacks, and the so-called "Astrakhan people." After landing near Tarki, Cheremisinov reportedly led an assault on the settlement, located approximately two kilometers from the coast, and captured it within half a day. The voevoda did not attempt to retain control of the town; instead, it was plundered and burned.

The Russian attack on Tarki led Caucasologist E. N. Kusheva to suggest that by the mid-16th century Tarki had already emerged as the political center of the Shamkhalate. The defense of the town was reportedly led by the shamkhal himself, who retreated into the mountains following the defeat. Although his name is not recorded in the Russian chronicles, researcher L. I. Lavrov, relying on epigraphic evidence, proposed that he may have been Buday I ibn Umal-Muhammad.

The objectives and overall outcome of the 1560 campaign remain a subject of scholarly debate. Some historians argue that the planned capture of Tyumen and the Shamkhalate of Tarki was not accomplished, and that I. S. Cheremisinov did not reach Kabardia. It has also been suggested that even Russian sources do not characterize the campaign as a clear victory, and that Cheremisinov may have been forced to withdraw by the shamkhal. According to this interpretation, the voevoda's failure to carry out the tsar's directives—namely the capture of Tyumen and the Shamkhalate and the advance to link up with the Kabardians—indicates that the campaign did not achieve its intended strategic objectives. At the same time, it is noted that the rulers of the Shamkhalate perceived the northern advance as a serious threat to their independence.

=== Final battle ===
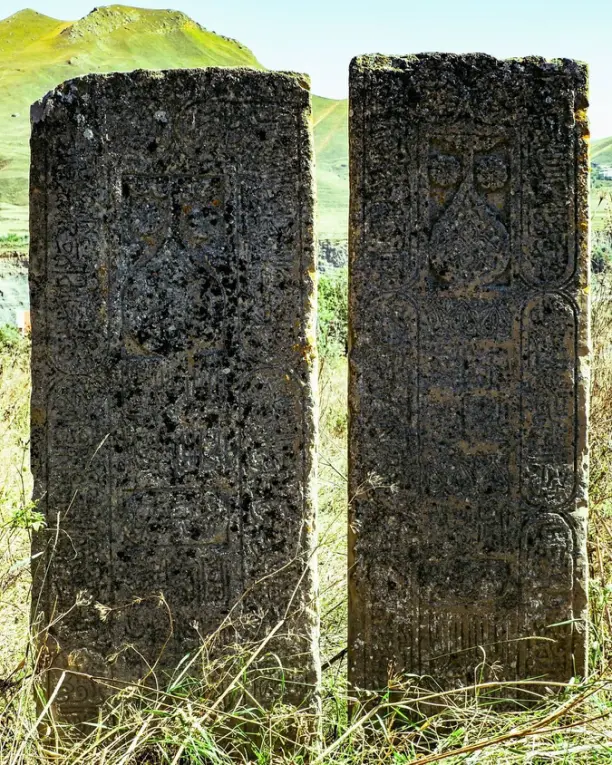
The grave of Buday I and his brother Surkhai

In 1567, the shamkhal Buday I intervened in the ongoing feudal conflict within Kabardia between the senior prince Temruqo Idar and the rival claimant Shiapshiqo Qeytuqo. Taking advantage of this internal division, Buday aligned himself with Qeytuqo and marched into Kabardian territory with a military detachment. His intervention formed part of the broader struggle for influence in the northeastern Caucasus, where regional rulers frequently involved themselves in the dynastic disputes of neighboring polities.

A major battle subsequently took place between the faction of rulers led by Temruqo the Braveand the coalition supporting Shiapshiqo Qeytuqo. In addition to the forces of the shamkhal, the ruler of Lesser Nogai, Ghazi ibn Urak, joined Qeytuqo's side. The confrontation represented not only an internal Kabardian succession struggle but also a wider contest between regional powers seeking to influence Kabardian affairs. The battle ended in a decisive victory for Temruqo Idar. Shamkhal Buday was killed during the fighting, along with his brother.

His death marked a significant setback for the Shamkhalate's involvement in Kabardian politics and weakened its immediate capacity to shape events in the region through direct military intervention. Further evidence of losses sustained by the ruling house of the Shamkhalate during this period is preserved in epigraphic material from the cemetery of the Shamkhal clan in Gazi-Kumukh. Tombstone inscriptions record the deaths of two additional sons of Amal-Muhammad—Buday-shamkhal and Surkhai—who are described as having been killed in "battle with the infidels" in 974 AH (1566–1567). This date corresponds chronologically with the construction of the first Russian fortress on the Terek River, an event that significantly altered the balance of power in the region. According to some researchers, these individuals likely died in attempts to hinder or resist the establishment of the Russian fortifications.

== Sources ==
- Shikhaliev, Sh. (2024). "Confrontation between Shamkhalate and Kabarda in the 16th century (the issue of international relations in the North Caucasus)". Minbar. Islamic Studies (in Russian). doi:10.31162/2618-9569-2024-17-2-263-314.
- Kotlyarov, Victor (2014). Загадки Кабардино-Балкарии (PDF) (in Russian). Nalchik.
- Akbiev, Arsen Soltanmuradovich (2015). "Соперничество кумыкских и кабардинских феодальных владетелей за гегемонию на Северо-Восточном Кавказе во 2-й половине XVI-1-й половине XVIII века". Известия СОИГСИ (in Russian).
