= Buday I =

Shamkhal of Tarki and Gazikumukh (died 1567)

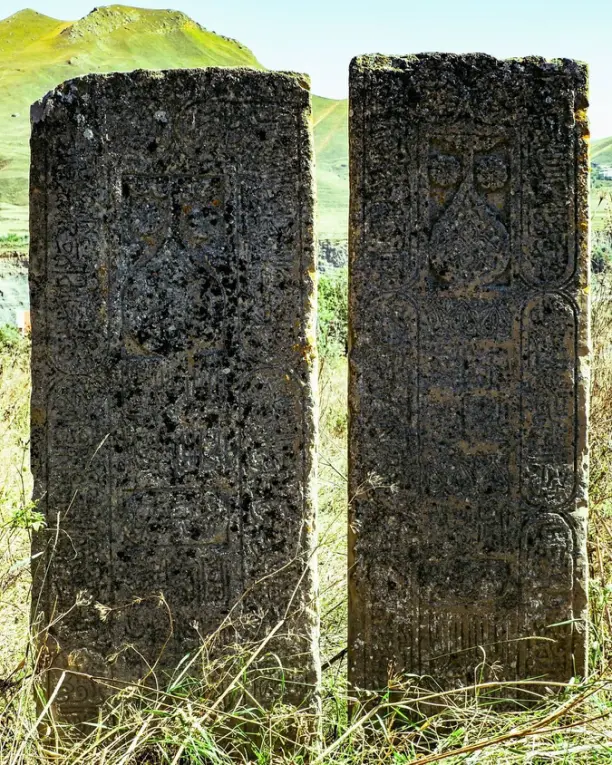
- The grave of Budai and Surkhai I in Kumukh

Shamkhal of Tarki and Gazikumukh
- Reign: 1557 — 1567
- Predecessor: Umal-Muhammad I
- Successor: Chopan ibn Buday
- Born: Shamkhalate of Tarki
- Died: 1567; Shamkhalate of Tarki
- Burial: Gazikumukh
- Issue: Chopan, Tunji-Alav, Alibek
- Dynasty: Shamkhals
- Father: Umal-Muhammad I
- Religion: Islam

Buday I ibn Umal-Muhammad (Kumyk: Будай Умал-Магьаматны уланы, romanized: Buday Umal-Mahamatnı ulanı) was the Kumyk shamkhal of Tarki and Gazikumukh from 1557 to 1567.

== Biography ==
He was born in Gazikumukh in the family of Gazikumukh shamkhal Umal Muhammad I. The first written mention of Buday I dates back to 1557, when Kabardian princes complained about him to tsar Ivan IV that He, in alliance with the Tyumen Tatars, made "active attacks on the possessions of Temruqo Idar", the ruler of Kabardia. In response, in 1560, the Astrakhan governor Ivan Chemerisov on the orders of the tsar attacked the possessions of Buday, ruining Tarki. However, the latter eventually forced them to retreat.

He is mentioned again in reports from 1558, in which Budai sends a letter to the Russian Tsar through his ambassador. The letter states that Budai notifies that the letter of the Russian Tsar has reached him. The year in the letter is indicated according to the old Russian calendar. The letter itself is as follows:

"A letter from Shevkal Kumytsky to the Tsar and Grand Duke, whose name is not written; and in it, it is written that the sovereign's ambassadors and letters reached him. Written on a sheet of paper, in Tatar; and in it is written at the top in Russian: flew on October 23, 7067, with the Shevkal ambassador with Bekbulat."

After that, in alliance with Kazi-Mirza, bey of the Lesser Nogai Horde, Pshiapshoqo Qeytuqo, A prince of Kabardia, they decided to oppose Russian encroachments. In 1567, at the confluence of the Sunzha and the Terek, Buday and later his brother Surkhay were killed on the battlefield, as evidenced by their gravestones at the Shamkhal cemetery in Gazikumukh.

== See also ==
- Kabardia
- Gazikumukh Shamkhalate
- Shamkhalate of Tarki

== Sources ==
- Magomedov, Murad (1997). History of Dagestan from ancient times to the end of the 20th-century. Makhachkala: Dagestan State University. p. 231. ISBN 978-5-7788-0138-7.
- Miziev, Ismail (2010-03-07). The history of Balkaria and Karachay in the writings of Ismail Miziev. Nalchik: Publishing house of M. and V. Kotlyarovs. pp. 277, 335. ISBN 978-5-93680-337-6.
- Gadzhiev, Vladilen (2013). History of Dagestan. Vol. 1. Tbilisi: Рипол Классик. p. 281. ISBN 978-5-458-34487-6.
