= Russo-Turkish War (1568–1570) =

First conflict of the Russo-Turkish wars

- Part of the Russo-Turkish wars
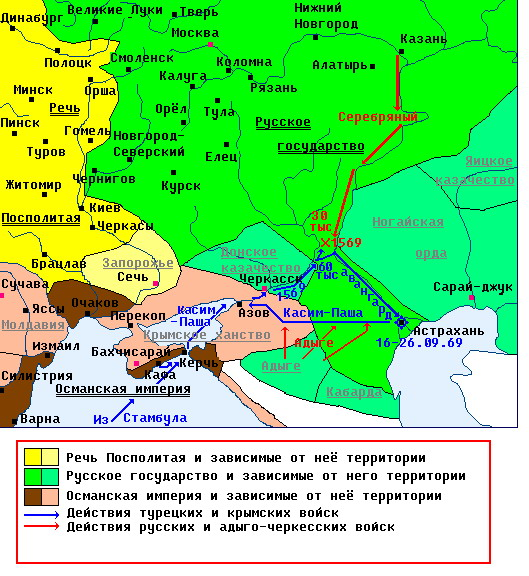
- Russo-Turkish War (1568–1570)
| Date | 1568–1570 |
| Location | Astrakhan and Azov |
| Result | Russian victory |

Belligerents
| Tsardom of Russia; Don Cossacks; Zaporozhian Cossacks; Nogai Horde; Kabardia (East Circassia) | Ottoman Empire; Crimean Khanate; Lesser Nogai Horde; Shamkhalate of Tarki; Kazakh Khanate (until 1569) |

Commanders and leaders
| (Tsardom of Russia) Ivan the Terrible (Tsardom of Russia) Pyotr Serebrianyi; Mikhail Cherkashenin; Mykhailo Vyshnevetsky; Tinekhmat Biy; Temruqo the Brave | (Ottoman Empire) Selim II (Ottoman Empire) Sokollu Mehmed Pasha (Ottoman Empire) Mustafa Pasha; Devlet I Giray (Kazakh Khanate) Haqnazar Khan (Kazakh Khanate) Shigai Khan (Kazakh Khanate) Jalym Sultan; Ghazi ibn Urak |

Strength
| (Tsardom of Russia) 30,000 troops | (Ottoman Empire) 20,000 troops 30,000–50,000 troops |

Casualties and losses
| (Tsardom of Russia) Unknown; 500 killed, 1,000 wounded | (Ottoman Empire) 60,000: Over two-thirds of the forces perished.; Ottoman fleet destroyed by a storm. |

The Russo-Turkish War (1568–1570) or Don-Volga-Astrakhan campaign of 1569 (referred to in Ottoman sources as the Astrakhan Expedition) was a war between the Tsardom of Russia and the Ottoman Empire over the Astrakhan Khanate. It was the first of twelve Russo-Turkish wars ending with World War I in 1914–18.

In the 1550s, Russia conquered the Khanate of Astrakhan, expanding into the North Caucasus, which the Ottoman Empire, and especially their ally and vassal, the Crimean Khanate, regarded as part of their sphere of interest. The Crimean Tatars had been at war with Russia for a long time, but the operation that the Ottoman Empire had been considering for years did not begin until the summer of 1569, when a military expedition composed of Turks and Crimean Tatars began its march to the area between the Don and Volga rivers.

An integral part of the military expedition was a plan to dig a canal connecting the rivers which, once completed, would allow the former Khanate of Astrakhan to be captured from the Russians. Control of the lower reaches of the rivers and the completion of a canal between them would have meant control of the entire Caucasus south of them, as well as a direct waterway between the Black Sea and the Caspian Sea. The expedition and the excavation of the canal were hampered by the difficulty of organizing maintenance and the challenging conditions of the Astrakhan steppe, as well as the distrust between the Tatars and the Turks. In early autumn, the Ottoman and Tatar armies were ordered to retreat, and they left Astrakhan through the partly dry and barren, partly swampy and boggy steppe. The Turks suffered their greatest losses on the return march due to thirst and hunger. The first confrontation between Russia and the Ottoman Empire ended in a military defeat for the latter.

== History ==
In 1556, the Astrakhan Khanate was conquered by Ivan the Terrible, who had a new fortress built on a steep hill overlooking the Volga.

In 1568, the Ottoman Grand Vizier Sokollu Mehmed Pasha, who was the real power in the administration of the Ottoman Empire under Selim II, initiated the first encounter between the Ottoman Empire and her future northern arch-rival Russia. The results presaged the many disasters to come. A plan to unite the Volga and Don by a canal was detailed in Constantinople. In the same year, the Kazakhs invaded the Nogai Horde and annexed their northern territories up in the Irtysh and the Ural Rivers. However they soon retreated after Russian forces arrived in Astrakhan.

Martin Janet explains the outbreak of the war by saying that the Russians interfered in the trading affairs of the Ottomans and prevented the pilgrimage to Mecca. Vitaly Penskoi and Stanford Shaw argue that it was to occupy Astrakhan, which could have become the northern base for attacking the Safavids or the core for a northern defensive system. Murat Yaşar also claims that Astrakhan was the target of the Ottomans. The Ottoman Empire sent a large force under Mustafa Pasha of 20,000 Turks and 50,000 Tatars to lay siege to Astrakhan. Meanwhile an Ottoman fleet besieged Azov. However, a sortie from the garrison under Knyaz (prince) Serebrianyi-Obolenskiy, the Russian military governor of Astrakhan, drove back the besiegers. A Russian relief army of 30,000 attacked and scattered the workmen and the Tatar force sent for their protection. On their way home up to 70% of the remaining soldiers and workers froze to death in the steppes or became victims of attacks by Circassians. The Ottoman fleet was destroyed by a storm. The Ottoman Empire, though militarily defeated, achieved safe passage for Muslim pilgrims and traders from Central Asia, and two years later, as a result of the Crimean raids, the Russians were forced to destroy a large section of the fort on the Terek River. The Russians did this because of the protracted hostilities in Livonia and fearing a new Ottoman campaign against Astrakhan.

== Crimean Tatar sabotage ==
According to Ottoman chroniclers and modern scholars, the Crimean Khan Devlet I Giray sabotaged the Ottoman campaign to capture Astrakhan in 1569 by spreading rumors that damaged the army's morale. Allegedly, he circulated warnings about harsh winter conditions and an approaching Muscovite relief force. Following his advice, the Ottoman army chose to retreat through the North Caucasus via Kabardia and Beshtau toward Taman and Kefe (Theodosia). During this retreat, many soldiers died or lost their equipment due to the severe conditions of the North Caucasian steppe. More importantly, the Circassian tribes of the Kabardian region attacked the retreating Ottoman soldiers at every opportunity. For the Ottomans, the campaign was a complete failure.
