= Temruqo the Brave =

Grand Prince of Kabardia from late 1550s to 1571

Temruqo Yidar
- Temruqo the Brave; Prince of Princes
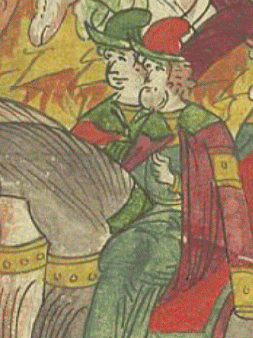
- Temruqo together with his son Domanuk in the Facial Chronicle, 16th century

Grand Prince of Kabardia
- Reign: 1550s – 1571
- Predecessor: Qeytuqo I of Kabardia
- Successor: Qambolet Yidar
- Born: 1502; Kabardia
- Died: 1571; Kabardia
- Issue: Sons: Domanuk; Mamstruk; Ulgairuk; Sultankul; Mazlov; Daughters: Maria Temryukovna; Altynchach Temryukovna; Malhurub Temryukovna
Names
- Temruqo, son of Yidar
- Kabardian: Айдар и къуэ Темырикъу
- House: Inalid dynasty; House of Yidarey
- Father: Yidar of Kabardia
- Religion: Unknown
- Military career
- Nickname: The Brave
- Conflicts: War against Crimeans; Campaigns in Central Caucasus; Ingush Campaign; Ossetian Campaign; Svaneti Campaign; Kumyk Campaign; Kabardian Civil War; Astrakhan War (1569); Withdrawal through Kabardian road; Circassian-Kumyk Wars; Russian-Kumyk Wars; Battle of Afips (DOW)

Temruqo Yidar, (Note: Kabardian: Айдарыкъуэ Темрыкъуэ Russian: Темрюк Идарович) also known as Temruqo the Brave, (Note: Kabardian: Темрыкъуэ ЛIыхъу Russian: Темрюк Храбрый) was a Kabardian prince of the House of Yidar who served as Grand Prince of Kabardia during the mid-to-late 16th century. He is regarded as one of the most influential Circassian rulers of the period, known for consolidating Kabardian power, leading military campaigns across the North Caucasus, and establishing an alliance with the Tsardom of Russia under Tsar Ivan IV.

During his reign, Temruqo fought rival princely factions within Kabardia and expanded Kabardian influence into parts of the central Caucasus through a series of campaigns against neighboring powers and mountain communities. His political alliance with Muscovy was strengthened in 1561 through the marriage of his daughter, Maria Temryukovna, to Ivan IV, an event that marked the beginning of long-term Kabardian–Russian relations.

== Early life ==
Temruqo was born around 1502. Very little is known about his early life, but he was apparently a participant in the Circassian capture of Astrakhan in 1532. Following this, in 1533, the Nogais recaptured the city and installed their own candidate on the Astrakhan throne. After the fall of Astrakhan, the Nogais began preparing for a decisive campaign against Kabardia. In the spring of 1535, a large Nogai army marched into the Ciscaucasus. A letter from the Russian ambassador to the Nogai Horde, D. Gubin, reported in Moscow in May 1535, states:

Koshum Murza, Mamai Murza, Smail Murza, Kelmagmet and Urak, and all the minor Murzas, having gathered their people, said, "Let us go fight the Circassians."

Along with Pshiapshoqo, the Kabardian army was led by Temruqo. Kabardians, having assembled a significant force but uncertain of the enemy’s direction, sent the young princes Qidirshoko Yidar and Tepsaruqo Talostan with 100 selected horsemen for reconnaissance. After assessing the scale of the threat, they moved their cattle, horse herds, and families into the mountains for safety.

The first major clash took place at the confluence of the Malka and Terek rivers. Despite strong resistance, the Nogais, benefiting from numerical superiority, pushed back the Kabardians. Threatened with encirclement, the Kabardians withdrew and took up positions between the Baksan and Psygansu rivers. The Nogais advanced further, devastating abandoned settlements. Exploiting their dispersal, the Kabardians began attacking them in smaller groups. The Nogais regrouped and advanced toward the Psygansu River, where they encountered fortified Kabardian positions near the political center of Kabardia, between present-day Aushiger and Kashkhatau. After another fierce engagement, the Kabardians were again forced to retreat into the mountains, where prolonged fighting in gorges and forests resulted in heavy losses on both sides.

Following the arrival of approximately 2,000 Abazin reinforcements, the Kabardians launched a counteroffensive. In the decisive battle near Mount Kashkatau, the Nogai forces were defeated and forced into disorganized retreat. The Kabardians pursued them, capturing many prisoners, while also suffering significant losses among their own warriors and princes.

In his youth, Temruqo was regarded as a capable military leader. According to the characterization of Temruqo by Shora Nogmov, he disdained luxury, did not use a tent, and slept in the open on felt, using a saddle as a pillow. He ate horse meat, roasting it himself over coals. Nogmov further notes that “in these times of barbarism, proud Temryuk observed justice and the laws of knightly honor of his people.” This description closely resembles the classic chronicle portrayal of Sviatoslav I.

In the early 16th century, Temruqo entered into conflict with the sons of Qeytuqo, including Aslanbech and Shiapshoqo. As a result of this struggle, Temruqo was forced to migrate with his family to Lesser Kabardia. The conflict is generally considered to have stemmed from a dynastic dispute over the title of supreme prince of Kabardia. After the death of Prince Jilakhstan in the 1550s, Temruqo became the senior prince of Lesser Kabardia, and the territory under his control became known as “Yidarey”.

In the summer of 1552, Devlet I Giray led a campaign to Circassia, marking his first military expedition against the Circassians and his first campaign against a foreign polity. The campaign ended in a Crimean victory, during which the Kabardian prince Elbozdu (Albuzduy), brother of Temruqo, was captured together with his wife and children. However, later in the same year, the Tatar army was defeated by Temruqo.

== Reign ==
Most available sources are silent on Temruqo's early years. However, he became the Grand Prince of Kabardia in the 1550s.

=== Dagestani invasion ===
Upon becoming Grand Prince of Kabardia in the 1550s, Temruqo faced opposition from several Kabardian princes who sought the position for themselves. Among them was the Kabardian prince Qanshao Jilakhstenqo, son of Jilakhstan, who, after leaving Kabardia, allied with the Kumyks and raided Kabardian territory multiple times each year. During this period, Qanshao also persuaded Avar leader Khadan Utsmi to invade Kabardia, whose population had been weakened by internal strife. Khadan accepted and called upon his allies, including the Nogais and the Kumyks, assembling a united force against the Kabardians. In response, the Kabardians under Temruqo called upon their Trans-Kuban allies: the Abazins under Lev Achba and the Besleneys under Yelzheruqo Qanoqo.

Supreme command of the allied Kabardian forces was entrusted to the Besleney prince Yelzheruqo, son of Qanoqo. As the Avar Utsmi crossed the Terek River, Prince Yelzheruqo and his advance guard met the invading force and attempted negotiations. After negotiations failed, Yelzheruqo withdrew to prepared defensive positions. Two days later, the Utsmi advanced toward the trenches, and Yelzheruqo engaged the enemy. A fierce battle followed, reportedly lasting two days. On the third day, hostilities resumed. During the renewed fighting, the Utsmi was killed, causing confusion among his forces. According to tradition, the Kabardians exploited this disorder, launched a coordinated assault, and drove the opposing army toward the Terek River. It is claimed that only one-third of the invading force managed to escape. During the battle, Prince Koshkao—described as one of the instigators of the campaign—was also killed.

=== Crimean invasions ===
In 1553, a large Crimean Tatar horde led by Khan Devlet I Giray entered Kabardian lands. Significant destruction was inflicted; however, the Crimeans failed to establish a foothold in Kabardia and were eventually expelled by the Kabardians. Later in the summer of 1554, Devlet I Giray marched against the Circassians of the "Five Mountains" and returned with substantial spoils.

In 1555, the Crimean Horde, "with all of his forces," attacked the Circassians again. Russian troops came to the aid of the Kabardians, but in the ensuing battle against the khan’s elite army, they lost two thousand men. Despite these losses, the Russians inflicted heavy casualties on the khan’s forces. At the same time, the Kabardians dealt significant damage to Devlet Giray, forcing him to suspend his campaign and retreat.

In 1556, Devlet I Giray again led a Tatar force into Kabardia. Warned in advance, the Kabardians met the enemy near their borders, forcing the khan to retreat.

In that same year, while Dmytro Vyshnevetsky was campaigning against the Tatars and had captured the city of Islam-Kerman, the Kabardian princes Tazdrup and Dozibok, together with their forces, captured the cities of Temryuk and Taman on the orders of Ivan IV. There, Temruqo constructed a fortress and named it after himself; the settlement continues to bear his name.

=== Alliance with Russia ===
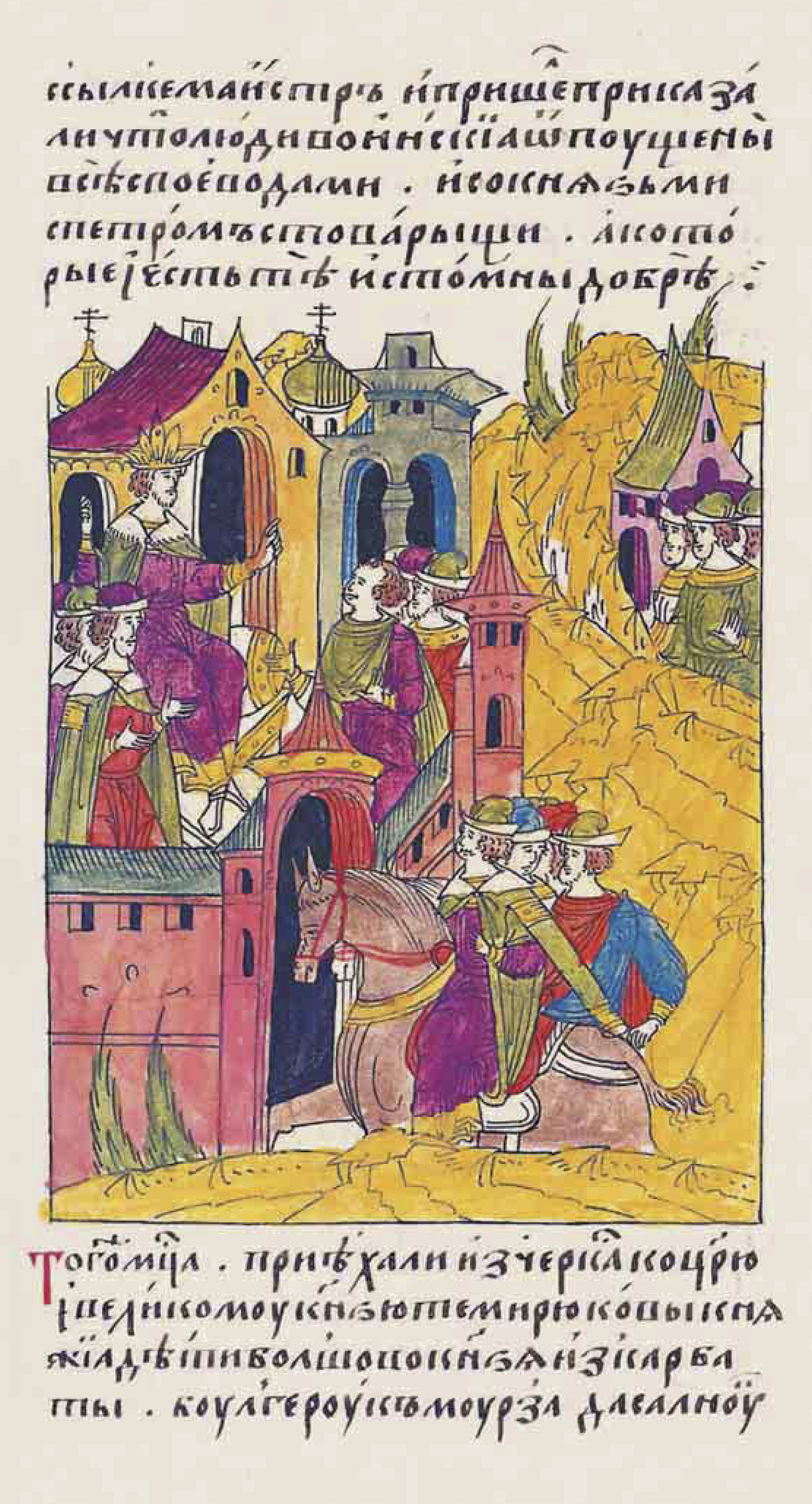
Arrival of the Circassian embassy to Moscow

In July 1557, a Kabardian embassy headed by Qanqilich Qanoqo set out for Moscow with the following statement:

I have come from the brethren, from the Kabardian princes of Circassia, from Temryuk Idarov and from Prince Tazryut, to petition that the sovereign grant them favor, order them to serve him and make them serfs, and that the sovereign grant them favor to Shavkal and order the Astrokhan voivodes to provide assistance. And Kanklych Murza Cherkassky spoke. “Only the sovereign will grant them favor, make them his serfs and help them against their enemies in the same way as he granted the Cherkassian Zhazhen princes Mashuk and Sebok and their brothers to their brothers, and with the Kabardian Cherkassians in one truth and in the Iverian conspiracy, the prince and the entire Iverian land and the sovereign with them bow to the sovereign, so that the sovereign Tsar Grand Prince Ivan IV would grant them the same favor as all of those others

In response to the embassy, Ivan the Terrible accepted Kabardia and the Western Circassians under his protection. A similar appeal was made in October 1558 by the sons of Temruqo Yidar, Ulgairuk and Saltankul. According to sources, information about these negotiations reached the Kumyks, and in 1559 a Kumyk embassy arrived at the Russian court requesting protection from Circassian princes who had entered Russian allegiance. At the same time, Kabardian complaints accused the Kumyks of conducting raids against them. In response, the Russian government dispatched a military expedition against the Shamkhalate of Tarki in support of the Kabardians.

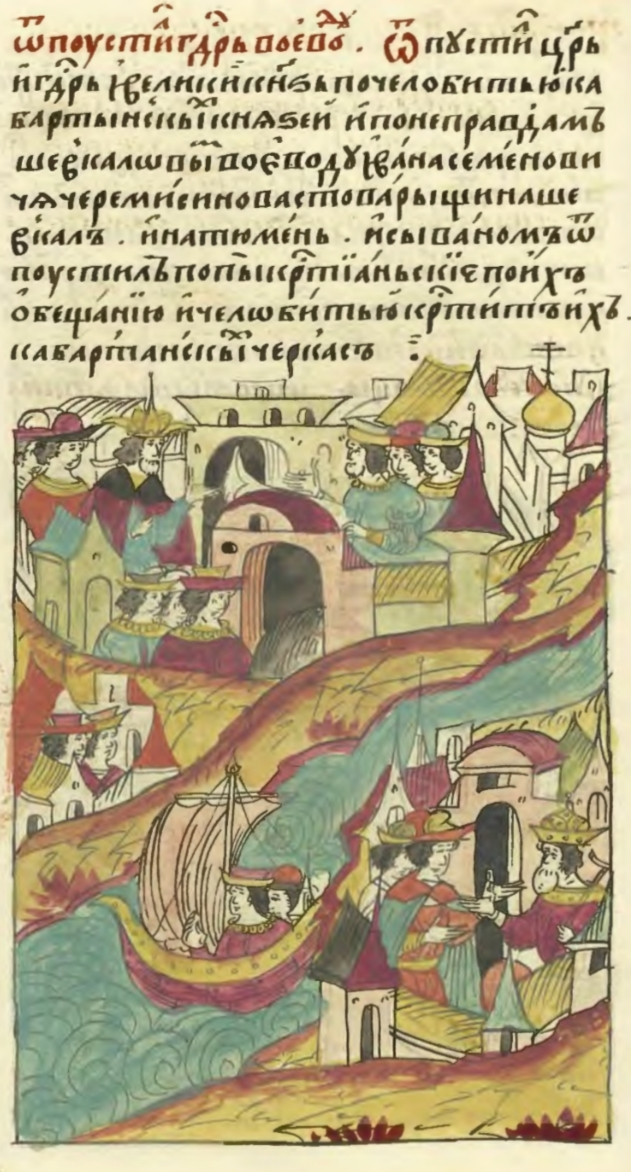
Tsar sends Ivan Cheremisinov to Dagestan to fight the Shamkhal

In the summer of 1560, an army under the voevoda I. S. Cheremisinov departed from Astrakhan by sea, likely using strug vessels, sailing along the western coast of the Caspian Sea toward Tarki, the center of the Shamkhalate. According to the chronicles, the force included streltsy, Cossacks, and the so-called “Astrakhan people.” After landing near Tarki, Cheremisinov reportedly led an assault on a settlement located approximately two kilometers inland and captured it within half a day. He did not attempt to retain control of the town; instead, it was plundered and burned.

The Russian attack on Tarki led Caucasologist E. N. Kusheva to suggest that by the mid-16th century, Tarki had already emerged as the political center of the Shamkhalate. The defense of the town was reportedly led by the shamkhal himself, who retreated into the mountains following the defeat. Although his name is not recorded in the Russian chronicles, researcher L. I. Lavrov, relying on epigraphic evidence, proposed that he may have been Buday I ibn Umal-Muhammad.

Russian-Kabardian ties were significantly strengthened after Ivan IV's marriage in August 1561 to Temruqo's daughter Maria Temryukovna. Ivan the Terrible's marriage had political significance for both Kabardia and Russia, primarily contributing to the weakening of Crimea's position in the North Caucasus. E. N. Kusheva writes:

The constant family ties between Adyghe feudal lords and the Crimean khans are well known. When, in 1561, Ivan the Terrible sent matchmakers to the Zhaneyev prince Sibok and the Kabardian prince Temryuk, the Moscow government undoubtedly pursued political goals, opposing its matchmaking plans to the marital ties between the sultan and the khan.

Soon after the wedding, Ivan the Terrible dispatched Nikita Golokhvostov and Ivan Fedtsov to Kabardia. The ambassadors were to express Temruqo's "sovereign's joy" at having "married" his daughter. The embassy brought the tsar's "salary", clothing, money, kupki, ladles, and other silver vessels. Rumors of the tsar's marriage to Temruqo's daughter quickly spread among other Kabardian rulers, who "taught them to be obedient and to pay tribute to him, and Temruqo submitted to the prince's will in every way." It is clear that by marrying his daughter to Ivan IV, Temruqo was primarily seeking to centralize power in Kabardia. He was not mistaken: the position of the supreme prince was significantly strengthened, although neither in the 16th century nor later did Kabardia become a unified state; feudal fragmentation was not overcome. Chronicles record that Temruqo strengthened his influence in Kabardia and managed to resist Turkish-Crimean aggression. The marriage of Maria Temryukovna and the Russian Tsar led to the conversion of several Kabardian princes to Orthodoxy, which did not interrupt their relations with their Muslim relatives. The baptism of Kabardian, Circassian, Nogai, and other Muslim princes was solemnly celebrated in Moscow and other cities of Rus', as N. M. Karamzin once wrote:

The faith... implanted between the Black and Caspian Seas in the most ancient times of the Byzantine Empire has not yet completely died out in these lands; its dark traditions and some rituals remain... the princes baptized their children in Moscow, entrusting them to the Tsar for upbringing—some were baptized themselves."11 Karamzin also lists princes who converted to Christianity. These include Sibok's son Kudadek (Alexander in Orthodoxy) and Temryuk's son Saltan (Mikhail), who learned to read and write in Moscow.

Temruqo's other actions also contributed to his strengthening of power. As a result, after establishing relations with Russia, the Supreme Prince's ties with Ismail, Khan of the Great Nogai Horde, were further strengthened. In 1560, Moscow proposed that Ismail act "in concert" with the Kabardian princes and Prince Dmitry Vishnevetsky, who later betrayed Ivan IV and traveled to the Polish King Sigismund Augustus.

=== Joint campaigns with Russia ===
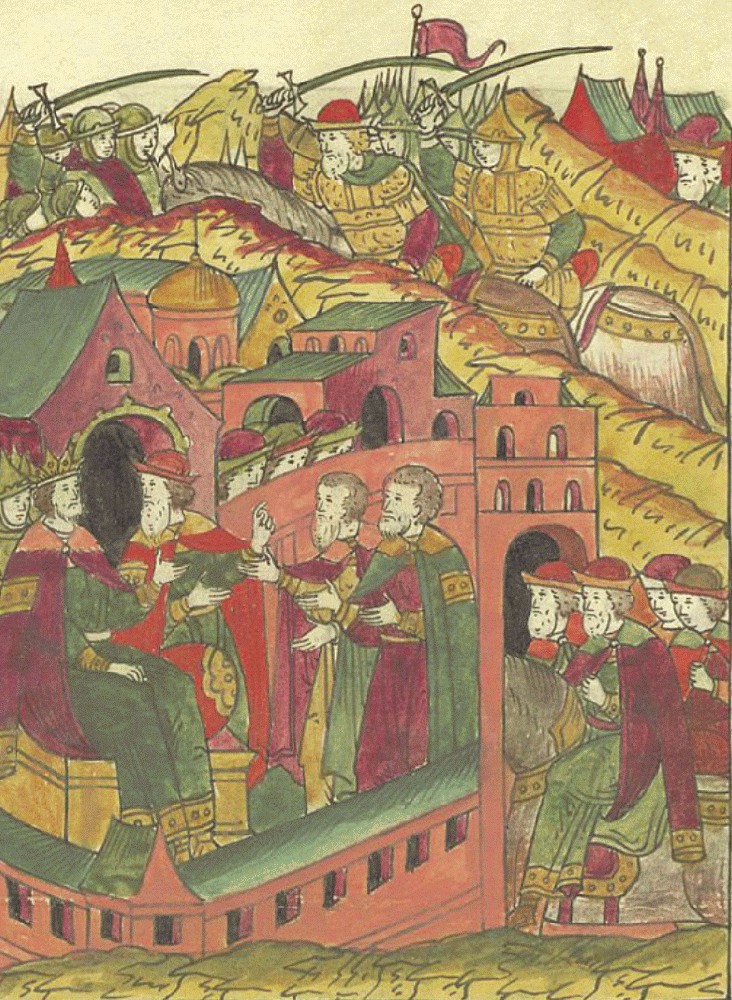
Ivan Dashkov tells Tsar about his campaign in Kabardia

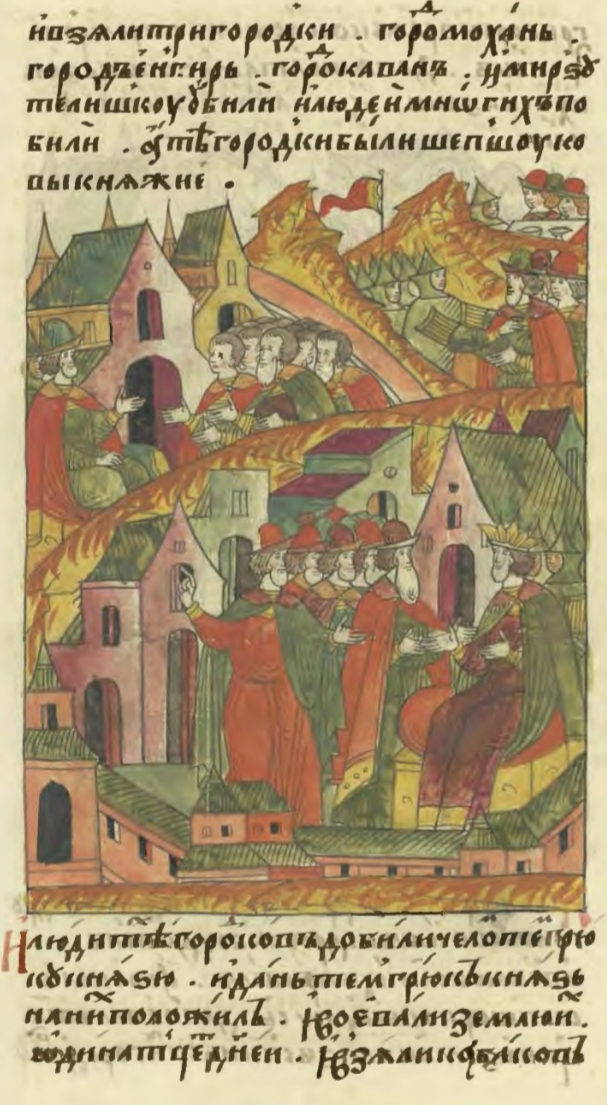
Temruqo (top left) imposes tribute on his enemies

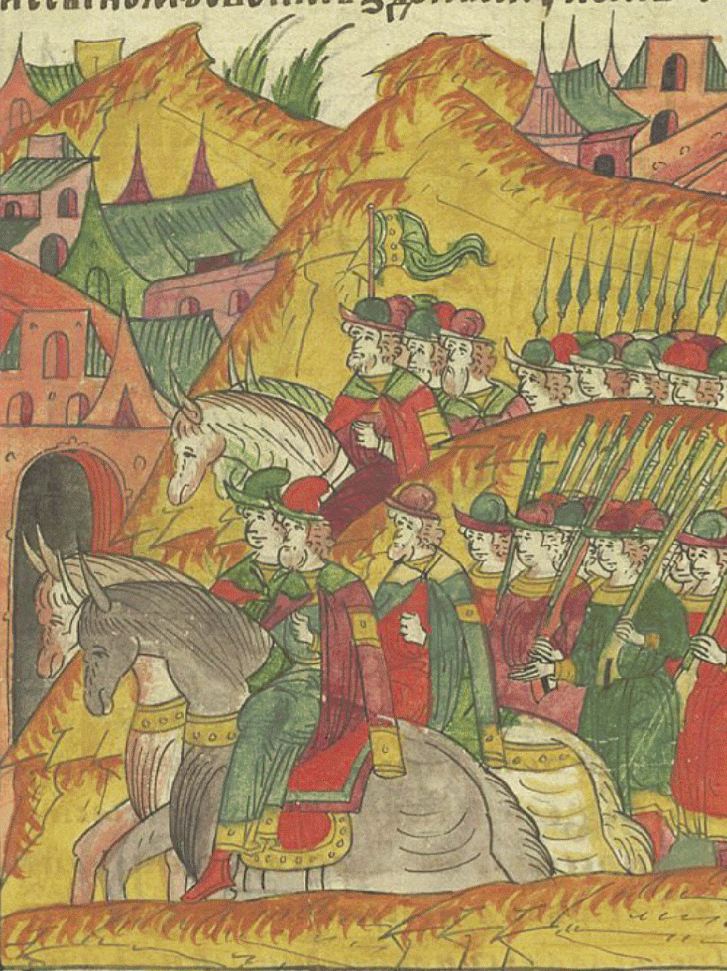
Grigory Semenovich Pleshcheev goes to Cherkassy (top row) together with Prince Temruqo, his son Domanuk and the head of the archers Grigory Vrazhsky (bottom row)

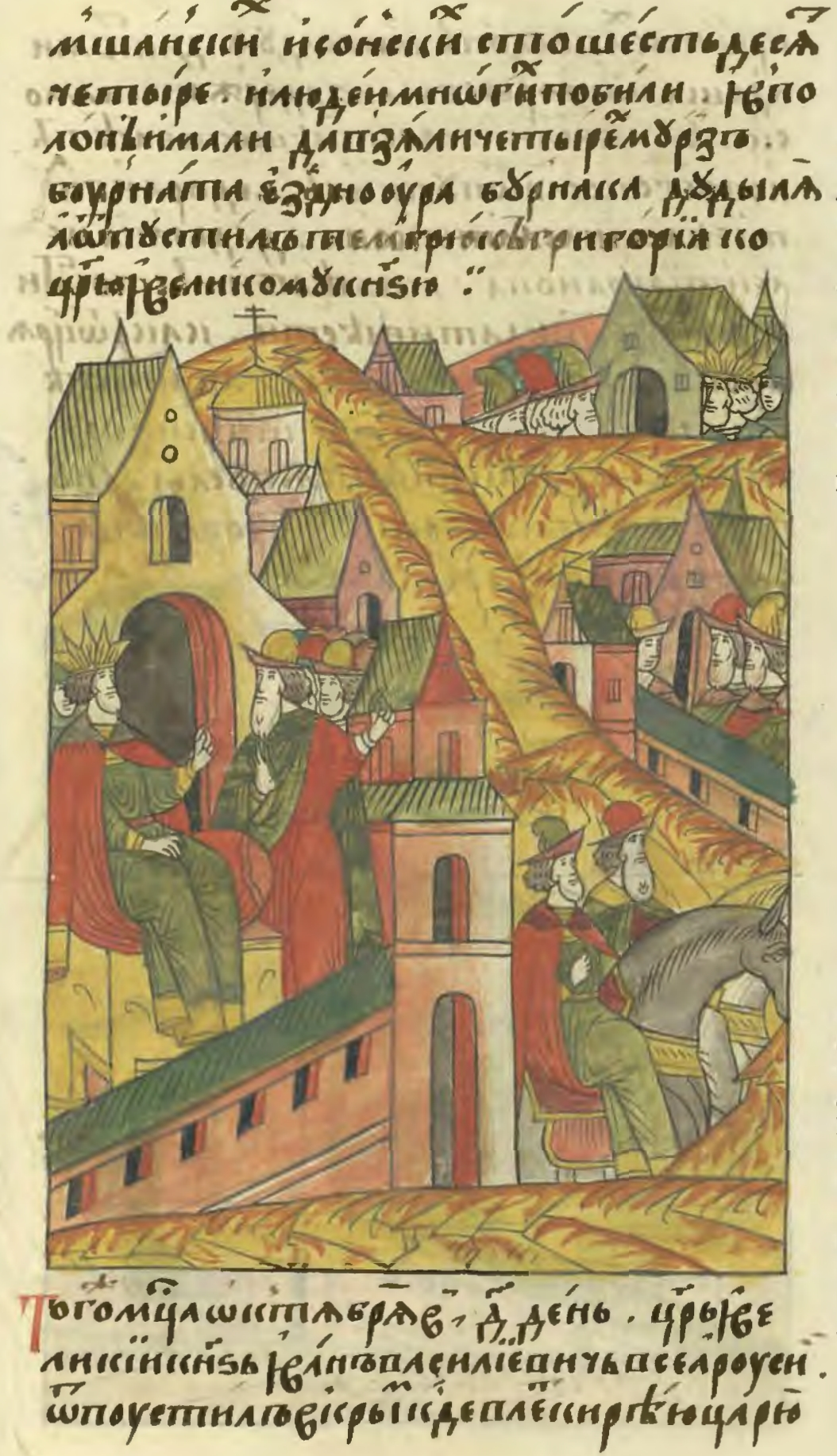
Temruqo sends Grigory back to the Tsar

In 1562, a joint campaign was launched by Temruqo and the Tsardom of Russia, led by voevoda Grigory Pleshcheyev, targeting rival factions in the North Caucasus.

The Facial Chronicle describes the campaign as follows:

“And Prince Temryuk and his son Domanuk-Mirza came to Cherkasy on December 6, and Grigory came to Cherkasy with them, and with him the head of the Streltsy Grigory Vrazhsky, and with them 500 Streltsy people and five Cossack atamans with Cossacks, and the Cossacks with them 500 people. "And Temryuk and the sovereign's people brought enmity to their enemies and brought them to their will, and fought against the Shepshukov uluses and fought against the Tatar lands near the Skinnye towns, and took three towns: the town of Mokhan, the town of Engir, the town of Kavan, and killed Mirza Telishka and massacred their people. And those towns belonged to the Shepshukov princes, and the people of those towns bowed to Prince Temryuk, and Prince Temryuk imposed tribute on them. And they fought for eleven days on their land, and took one hundred and sixty-four Mshansky and Sonsky taverns, and massacred their people and took four murzas prisoner: Burnat, Ezdonur, Burnak, Dudyl. And Temryuk released Grigory to the Tsar, the Grand Prince"

In September 1565, military forces led by Ivan Dashkov were sent against Shiapshoqo and his vassals Tazrit and Manta. These forces included boyar detachments from the Murom and Meshcheryan people, Cossacks from the "Ryazan Ukraine", and a detachment of Matthew Rzhevsky with "Circassian Cossacks and archers." The allied army entered Kabardia in October 1566 and encountered fierce resistance. Although the source provides limited detail on the intensity of the fighting, the battle ended in a victory for Temruqo.

=== Second Dagestani invasion ===
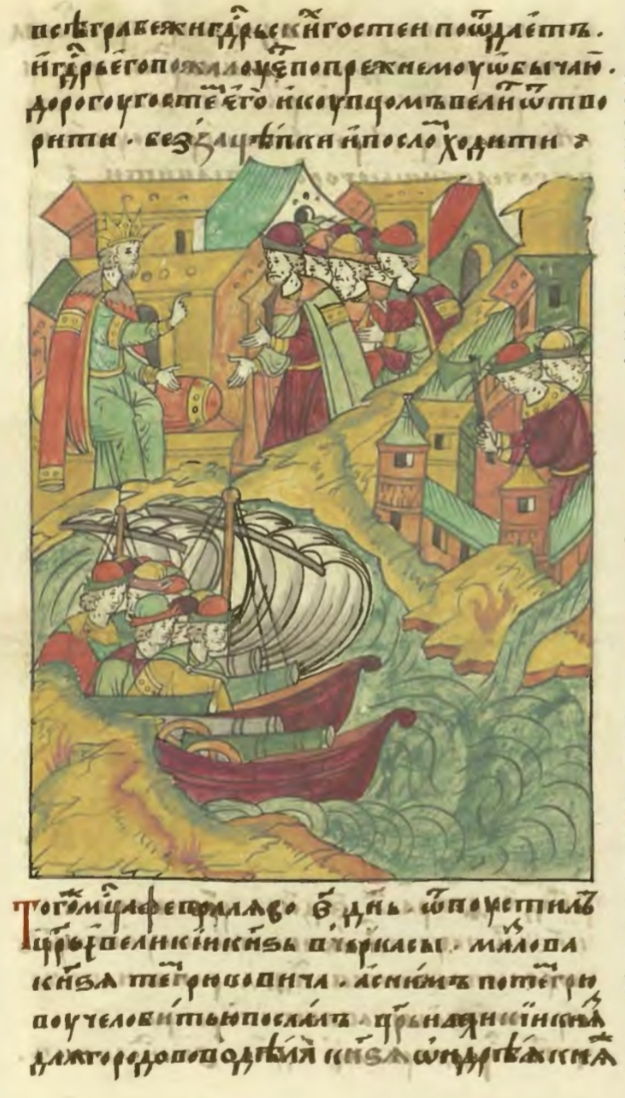
Ivan the Terrible sends Mazlov and Ulgairuk to Kabardia together with resources to build Terki Fortress

In 1567, the shamkhal Buday I intervened in the ongoing feudal conflict within Kabardia between the senior prince Temruqo and the rival claimant Shiapshiqo Qeytuqo. Taking advantage of this internal division, Buday aligned himself with Qeytuqo and marched into Kabardian territory with a military detachment. His intervention formed part of the broader struggle for influence in the northeastern Caucasus, where regional rulers frequently became involved in the dynastic disputes of neighboring polities. A major battle subsequently took place between the faction led by Temruqo Yidar and the coalition supporting Pshiapshoqo Qeytuqo. In addition to the forces of the shamkhal, the ruler of Lesser Nogai, Ghazi ibn Urak, joined Qeytuqo’s side. The confrontation represented not only an internal Kabardian succession struggle but also a wider contest between regional powers seeking influence over Kabardian affairs. The battle ended in a decisive victory for Temruqo Yidar. Shamkhal Buday was killed during the fighting, along with his brother. His death marked a significant setback for the Shamkhalate’s involvement in Kabardian politics and weakened its immediate capacity to influence events in the region through direct military intervention. Further evidence of losses sustained by the ruling house of the Shamkhalate during this period is preserved in epigraphic material from the cemetery of the Shamkhal clan in Gazi-Kumukh. Tombstone inscriptions record the deaths of two additional sons of Amal-Muhammad—Buday-shamkhal and Surkhai—who are described as having been killed in “battle with the infidels” in 974 AH (1566–1567). This date corresponds chronologically with the construction of the first Russian fortress on the Terek River, an event that significantly altered the balance of power in the region. According to some researchers, these individuals likely died in attempts to hinder or resist the establishment of Russian fortifications.

=== War with Ottomans ===
In the summer of 1569, the Ottomans launched a war against Russia, the first in a long series of conflicts between the two powers. A massive combined Ottoman–Crimean army, which contemporary Russian sources claim numbered up to 130,000 men, set out on a campaign against Astrakhan, under the command of Kasim Bey. The main objectives of the campaign were to “open the Astrakhan road” and to abandon the city built on the Terek (Terki). Both the Ottoman Empire and the Crimean Khanate attached great importance to the expedition, as its success would have disrupted Russia’s connections with the Caucasus and Central Asia and expelled Russian influence from the Ciscaucasia and the lower Volga. This, in turn, would have granted the Ottomans and the Crimeans significant strategic advantages in their struggle against both Iran and Russia.

Despite careful preparation, the campaign ended in failure. Kabardian cavalry took part in defeating the retreating Ottoman–Crimean forces, and sources emphasize that the retreat cost the Turks far greater losses than the campaign itself. By 24 October, only about one-third of the Ottoman troops had reached Azov. The remnants were loaded onto seagoing vessels and sent to Kaffa, but many ships were wrecked during a storm, resulting in heavy losses by drowning. According to the Russian ambassador to the Ottoman Empire, I. P. Novosiltsev, no more than 700 men from the Ottoman army ultimately returned to Constantinople.

== Death ==
According to Shora Nogmov, Crimean Khan Devlet I Giray assembled an army with the aim of completely exterminating the Pyatigorsk Kabardians. Prince Temruqo, having gathered a large force of Kabardians and other Adyghe tribes, advanced to the Akhupa River and, at its confluence with the Kuban, constructed a fortress where he awaited the enemy. Nogmov’s account contains inconsistencies, as he attributes command of the invading army to Devlet I Giray, while Russian sources identify Kalga Adil Giray as the commander. Estimates of the Crimean force vary widely: some sources place it at no fewer than 20,000 men, while higher estimates—including reinforcements from Astrakhan and Kazan Tatars—raise the figure to as many as 130,000. Even so, the force was relatively small compared to other Crimean campaigns during Devlet Giray’s reign, as Adil Giray was operating primarily with troops from his own appanage. The Circassians’ reliance on defensive tactics further suggests that they were numerically inferior.

The battle took place on the Afips River in July 1570; the earliest Russian ambassadorial reports date it to 30 July. According to Circassian folklore, the Tatar commander was enraged upon seeing that Temquro Yidar was aiding the Circassians. The same tradition emphasizes the brutality of the fighting, claiming that Tatar arrows “fell like snow” and struck with the force of cannon fire. During the battle, one such arrow pierced Temruqo, inflicting a mortal wound, while the fortress he had built was captured by the Tatars. Despite his injury, Temruqo continued to fight, and repeated Crimean attempts to cross the river were repelled. Nevertheless, two of his sons, Beberyuk and Mamstruk, were captured by the Tatars.

The aftermath of the battle proved catastrophic for the family of Temruqo Yidar. Sources report that Temruqo lost two of his sons during the fighting, a blow that not only had personal significance but also weakened his dynastic and political position. Moreover, Temruqo himself is said to have been grievously wounded in the course of the battle and later died as a result of those injuries, transforming an already costly and disputed engagement into a profound personal and dynastic disaster.

== In folklore ==
The following Circassian song was composed for Temruqo and was translated by Shora Nogmov:

Seven days passed in anticipation of the enemy, and nothing was seen or heard in the steppe. Our army stood idle on the waters of the Akhunsa.

Thanks to the good king; he informed us of the enemy’s approach, and the valiant prince Temryuk is ready to strike the common enemy.

A cruel battle flared up and Crimean arrows flew at Temryuk, like winter frost whitening the fields and trees.

But one fatal arrow found a way to pierce the brave prince and the wound was so deep that it was difficult to remove it.

A formidable warrior with countless forces came to us from a distant land, from across the sea through the isthmus, and took our fortress. The Crimeans tried hard to cross the Akhups and completely dislodge ours; it was bad without brave Temryuk, but ours held out.

And Qaytaq Yethluq with his golden mustache distinguished himself with courage; the hero of heroes Temryuk only sighed from a cruel wound. Yidar Tambiy, noticing our men's timidity, charged into the enemy's midst.

From the thickness of the bow came a sound like a gun, and from the fired arrow the bowstring rang. Upon his recovery, Prince Temryuk immediately gathered the Kabardians and hastened to the aid of the Russian Tsar, with whom they joined forces near the Sea of Azov. The Tsar greatly thanked Prince Temryuk for his loyalty and generously rewarded the Kabardians.

In this way, Prince Temryuk helped Russia many times; upon his return to his homeland, this kind, brave, and best of all our princes died of an old wound that had relapsed. The people said of him: “There is no greater valiant hero, no more courageous knight of ours, Prince Temryuk.”

== Legacy ==
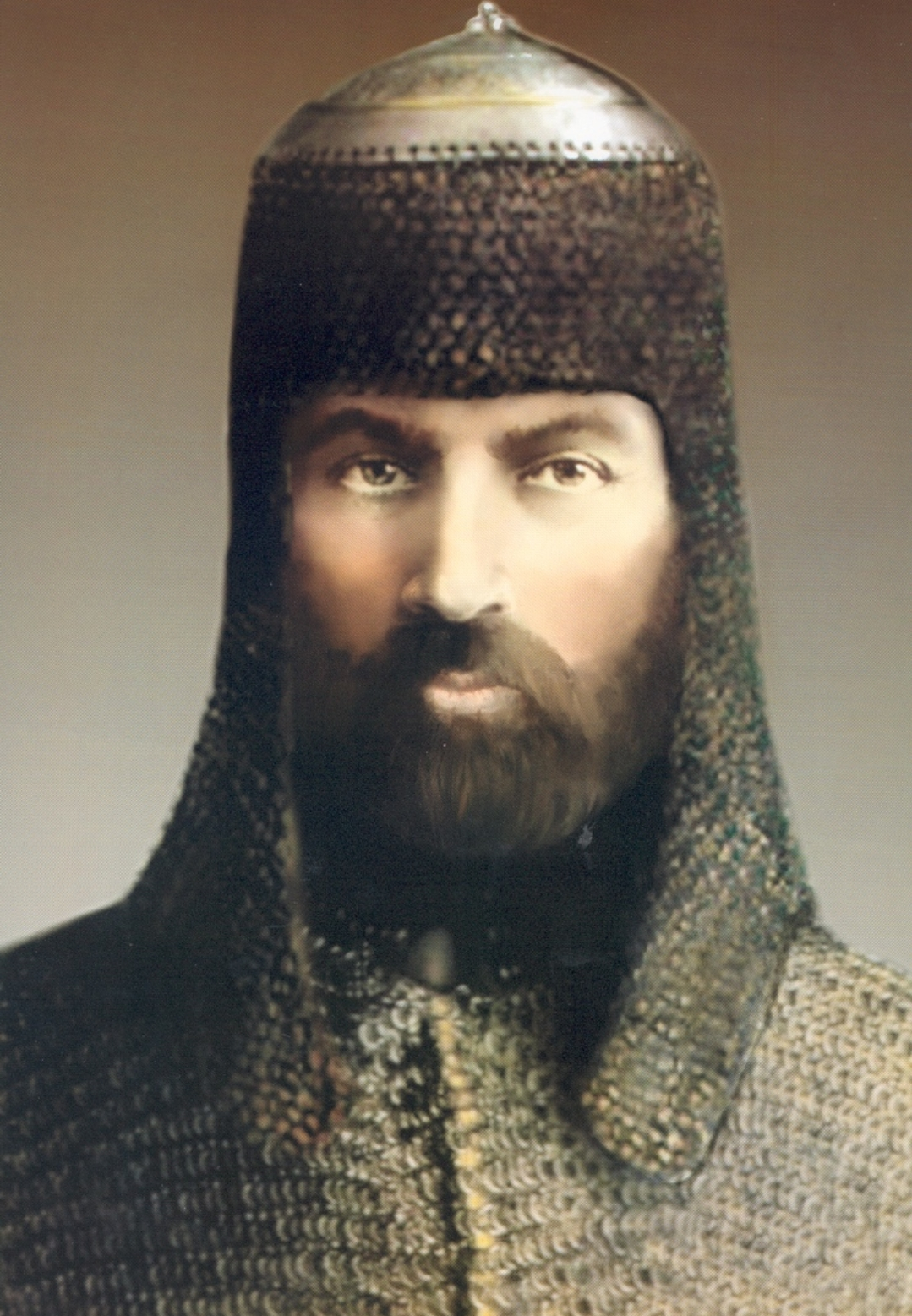
Modern depiction of Temruqo displayed in the Adyghe compound museum

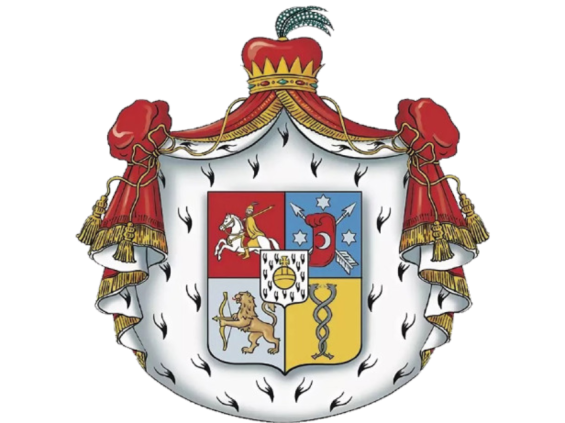
Coat of arms of the Princes Cherkassky

The military and political alliance between Kabardia and Russia, concluded in 1557 on behalf of the Supreme Prince of Kabardia, Temruqo, marked the beginning of sustained bilateral relations and a gradual political and cultural rapprochement between the two sides. This alliance was further strengthened in 1561 through a dynastic marriage between Tsar Ivan IV and Temruqo’s daughter, an event that symbolized the formalization of Kabardian–Russian cooperation at the highest level. In the decades that followed, representatives of the Kabardian feudal aristocracy assumed an important intermediary role in fostering relations between the Russian state and other peoples of the North Caucasus. Among these, the Cherkassky princely family—descendants and associates of Temruqo—emerged as particularly influential. It would not be an exaggeration to state that they played a leading role in consolidating political and diplomatic ties between Kabardia and Russia. From the mid-16th century onward, members of this family became actively involved in the political life of the Russian state, contributing to its administrative and military structures and helping to ensure its stability.

Temruqo’s descendants and their allies largely remained aligned with Russia, forming what became known as the Cherkassky princely dynasty within the Russian nobility. Despite the relatively limited resources at their disposal, Kabardian forces—particularly cavalry units associated with this lineage—participated in many of Russia’s military campaigns. Beginning with the Livonian War, Kabardian contingents were involved in numerous conflicts fought by the Russian state in the years following Temruqo’s death, reinforcing the long-term military dimension of the Kabardian–Russian alliance.

== Family ==
- Maria Temryukovna, wife of Ivan the Terrible
- Domanuk-murza
- Mamstruk-murza
- Ulgairuk-murza
- Sultankul
- Altynchach Temryukovna, who married Bekbulat, a Chinggisid, and khan of Astrakhan Khanate
- Malhurub Temryukovna, who married Tin Ahmed, beg of Nogai Horde.
- Mazlov, ambassador of Kabardia to Moscow in 1567,
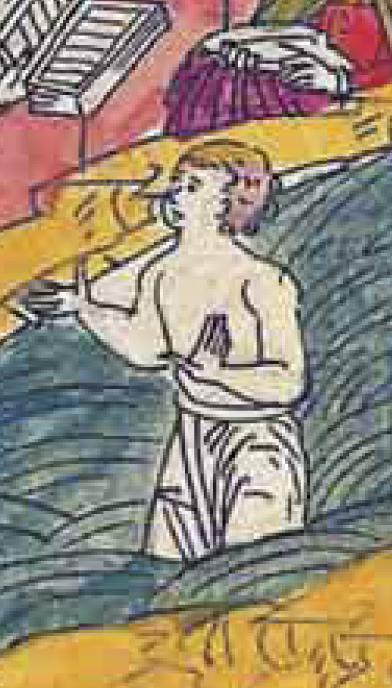
Saltankul during his baptism

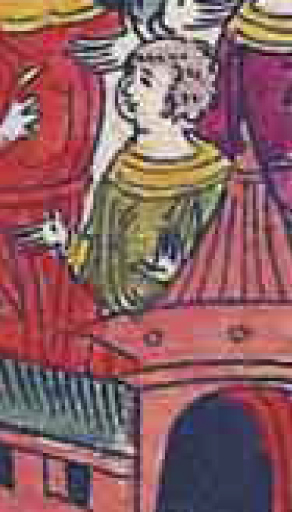
Ulgairuk while talking to the tsar

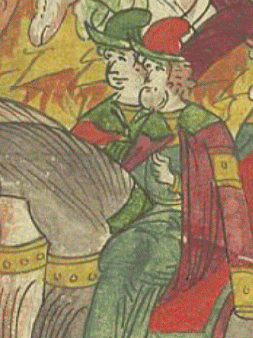
Domanuk (left) together with Temryuk

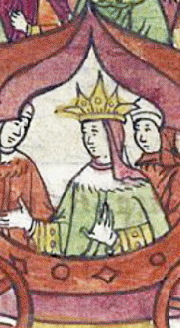
Maria Temryukovna traveling from Alexandrov to Moscow

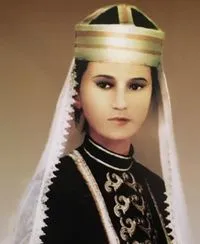
Altynchach Temryukovna

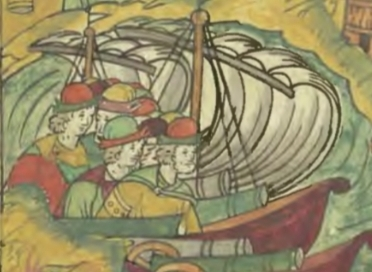
Tsar sends Mazlov to Kabardia

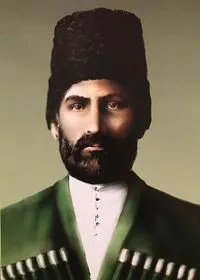
Mamstruk-murza

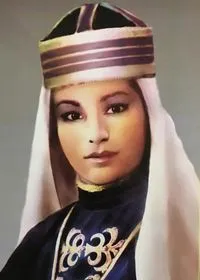
Malhurub Temryukovna
