= Crimean–Circassian war (1552–1556) =

Military conflict

Crimean-Circassian War (1552–1556)
- Part of Crimean–Circassian wars
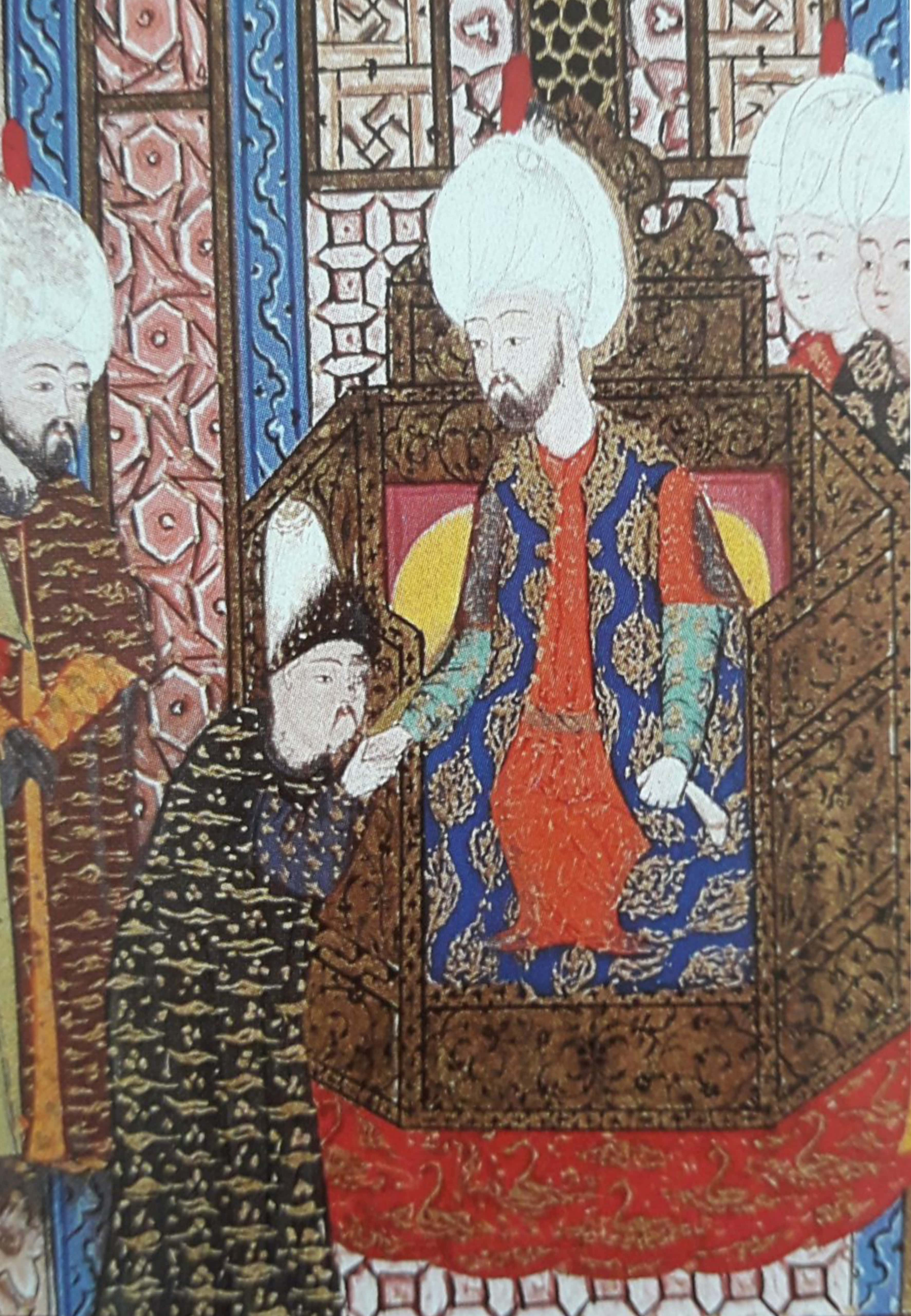
- Devlet I Giray together with Ottoman Sultan Suleiman the Magnificent in 1551.
| Date | 1551–1556 |
| Location | Kabardia, Temryuk and Taman Peninsula |
| Result | Circassian victory |

Belligerents
| Kabardia; Tsardom of Russia | Crimean Khanate; Ottoman Empire |

Commanders and leaders
| Temruqo Idar; Prince Dozibok; Prince Tazdrup; Elbozdu (POW) | Devlet I Giray |

Casualties and losses
| Heavy (Tsardom of Russia) 2,000 killed | Very heavy |

The Crimean-Circassian War of 1552–1556 was a military conflict between the Crimean Khanate and the Kabardian Principality.

== Background ==
Kabardian prince Temruqo believed that the only way for Kabardian independence was to ally with Russia. Ivan the Terrible supported Temruqo's goal to extend his power inside Kabardia and to unify the lands of Kabardians under his reign. Temroqwa established a fort in Mozdok that enabled the Circassian and Russian forces to perform joint training. Ossetian and Ingushetian lands, as well as the Turkic people, became subjects of the Kabardian raising power. Temruqo's expansion extended towards the Georgian kingdoms in the south.

== War ==
In the summer of 1552, Devlet I Giray led a campaign to Circassia, marking his first military expedition against the Circassians and his first campaign against a foreign polity. The campaign ended in a Crimean victory, during which the Kabardian prince Elbozdu (Albuzduy) was captured together with his wife and children. A decree issued in 1553 by Sigismund II Augustus, Grand Duke of Lithuania and King of Poland, addressed to Devlet Giray, reports the event as follows:

In June of last year, you set out with your happy horse and a great army from the Azov castle of the Turkic Kaiser and marched into the land of the Pyatigorsk Circassians against Prince Albuzduy, who, in collaboration with the Grand Prince of Moscow, harbored evil intentions against your state. You conquered his country and, with God’s help, captured him, his wife, and his children. Now you, our brother, have returned to your country with your army in good health. Upon hearing the news of your health and the victory you have won against our enemy, we rejoiced wholeheartedly and wish you good health. Your enemy is also our enemy, and your happiness is also our happiness.

However, later in the same year, the Tatar army was defeated by Temruqo Idar.

In 1553, a large Crimean Tatar horde led by Khan Devlet Giray entered the Kabardian lands. Huge destruction was made. However, the Crimeans could not gain a foothold in Kabardia, the Kabardians expelled them.

Later in the summer of 1554, Devlet I Giray marched against the Circassians of the "Five Mountains" and returned with great spoils, describing his campaign to the Polish king Sigismund Augustus as follows:

The Great Horde's free king Davlet-Kirey sends his fraternal affection and bow to our brother, the great king Zhigimont Augustus.

I let you know that just this summer I went with my army against my enemy, the Cherkasy of Petigorsk, and from there, having arrived in good health with great booty to my lordship, I released your ambassador, the great lord Skumin and Lvovich, to you, our brother, with all good things. And those Cossacks who, without my will, having seized your Ukraine under lock and key, committed some mischief and your people were taken, and I, having learned of this, having sworn allegiance and completed the oath, having found all those people, delivered them to the hands of your ambassador and sent to you, my brother, as a brotherly gesture of friendship, have already sent them. And so I have sent to you, our brother, and to your ambassador, Lord Skumin, having appointed my ambassador, the great Chanboldu Omil'desh, 19 and in all brotherly friendship, and before him my messenger, to let him know about the brotherly friendship, I have sent Mamysh-murza, my good servant, and I ask for two coats of armor from you, our brother. And you, our brother, would send two good coats of armor through that messenger of ours, and send that messenger of mine without delay to me, your brother, with all good things.

In 1555, the Crimean Horde, "with all of his forces," attacked the Circassians again. Russian troops came to the aid of the Kabardians, but in the ensuing battle with the khan's elite army, they lost two thousand warriors. Despite these casualties, the Russians inflicted very heavy losses on the khan. At the same time, the Kabardians managed to deal significant damage to Khan Devlet Giray, forcing him to suspend his campaign against the Circassians and retreat.

In 1556, the Crimean Khan Devlet Giray at the head of the Tatar horde moved again to Kabardia. Kabardians, warned in advance, met the enemy on the outskirts of their borders. Khan Devlet Giray was forced to retreat.

In that same year, while Dmytro Vyshnevetsky was fighting against the Tatars and had captured the city of Islam-Kerman, the Kabardian princes Tazdrup and Dozibok, together with their forces, captured the cities of Temryuk and Taman on the orders of Ivan IV. There, Temruqo Idar built a fortress and named it after himself; this place is still called Temryuk to this day.

== Aftermath ==
In 1569, in an attempt to push back the Russian forces, Tatar-Ottoman joint troops attacked the city of Astrakhan in the Khanate of Kazan. The joint troops were annihilated by a sudden attack from Temruqo. Temruqo kept his advance until north of the Don and established the city of known today as Novocherkassk (New Circassia) near Rostov.
