= Chopan ibn Buday =

Shamkhal of Tarki and Gazikumukh
- Reign: 1569 — 1588
- Predecessor: Surkhay I ibn Umal-Muhammad
- Successor: Andia ibn Chopan
- Born: unknown Shamkhalate of Tarki
- Died: 1588; Buynak
- Issue: sons: Andiy-shamkhal, Eldar-shamkhal, Muhammad-shamkhal, Giray-shamkhal (Surkhay?), Sultanmut
- Dynasty: Shamkhals
- Father: Buday I or Alibek
- Religion: Islam

Chopan ibn Buday or Chopan II (Kumyk: Çopan Budaynı ulanı, 1569–1588) was a Kumyk shamkhal (ruler) of Tarki from 1569 to 1588.

== Origin ==
He descended from the Kumyk dynasty of shamkhals and was the son of Alibek, according to another version the son of Buday I and thus the nephew of the previous khan, after whose death in 1569 he became the new ruler of Shamkhalate.

== Biography ==
=== Relations with the Russian Empire ===
From the very beginning, in the confrontation against the Russian Tsardom, Chopan II decided to rely on the Ottoman Empire and the Crimean Khanate, with whom an allied treaty was concluded. In 1570, Chopan shamkhal with his troops took part in the campaign of the Ottoman-Crimean Tatar troops against Astrakhan. However, the campaign was unsuccessful, Astrakhan could not be captured, and, in the end, Shamkhal's allies retreated to Azov.

At the same time, Chopan's troops destroyed the fortress built by the Russians on the Sunzha river, broke into Kabardia, then took part in the battle against the troops of tsar Ivan the Terrible on the side of the Crimean khan Devlet I Giray.

In addition to relations with the Ottoman sultan Selim II and the Crimean khan Devlet I he had allies among noble families in Kabardia and is in family ties with the Kaitag utsmis.

=== Relations with the Ottoman Empire ===
In 1576, after the death of shah Tahmasp I, he supported Ismail II during the struggle for power, but after his death Chopan went over to the side of the Ottoman Empire. In the same year, together with his brother Tunji-Alav, the Tabasaran bey Ghazi Salih and the Shirvan people he opposed the Persian troops of the Qizilbash, who were forced to leave Shirvan. For these actions he received an award from the Ottoman sultan, at whose invitation he visited the empire in 1578. On October 17 of the same year, the shamkhal was received by Sardar Lala Mustafa pasha, who was presented with an honorary robe, a saber and a war horse with full equipment. In addition, for merits in the war against the Qizilbash, Chopan II was given the Shaburan sanjak as an inheritance and his brother Tunji-Alav received the sanjaks of Akhty and Ikhir. For this, the shamkhal undertook to defend Shirvan and supply the Ottoman troops with provisions.

In 1578, together with the Ottoman detachments, Chopan occupied the city of Shamakhi, but there were not enough forces to develop the offensive. Soon shamkhal with allies went on the defensive from the Persian troops led by Aras Khan. In the end, on November 30, he retreated to Derbent. In August 1579 he ended up with a new Ottoman army led by Mehmet-bey and the Crimean Tatars. In 1580, all these troops went on the offensive and the army of Chopan II participated in the conquest of Shirvan, Karabakh, along with Yerevan and Tabriz (one of the capitals of Iran).

In 1585, relations with the Ottomans suddenly deteriorated, as a result of the intention of the sultans to turn Dagestan into one of their eyalets and the construction of fortresses on the Terek river. Not wanting to enter into an open conflict, Chopan prevented this plan in every possible way. Relations between the Gazikumukh shamkhalate and Iran begin to recover. At the same time, back in 1586, Chopan II sent an embassy led by his sons Surkhay and Sultan-Mut to the Moscow Tsar in order to improve relations between states. However, he failed to fully improve relations with his neighbors: Russian troops began to prepare for the resumption of control over the lands in the basin of the Terek and Sunzha rivers, the Kakhetian king Alexander II supported some of the sons of Chopan II with demands for power.

In 1588, the Russians built a fortress on the Terek river. In this regard, Chopan II saw a threat to his possession and began activities against them alone. He died in 1589. According to other sources, Chopan was the ruler of the country from Kaitag, the Kura valley, Avaristan, the Circassians and the Terek river to the Caspian Sea and died in Buynak in 1574.

== Family ==
He had 4 or 5 sons, 4 of them were from the daughter of utsmi (ruler) of Kaitag Sultan Ahmed:

1. Andiy-shamkhal
2. Eldar-shamkhal
3. Muhammad-shamkhal
4. Giray-shamkhal (Surkhay?)

One of his sons was considered illegitimate from the daughter of the Kabardian ruler Uzun-Cherkess:

1. Sultanmut

He had a daughter who was married to Tahmasp I:

1. Sultan-Agha Khanum
  1. Pari Khan Khanum

== See also ==
- Buday I
- Shamkhal (title)
- Shamkhalate of Tarki

== Sources ==
- Gerber, Johann (1760). Information about the peoples and lands located on the western side of the Caspian Sea between Astrakhan and the Kura river and about their condition in 1728. St. Petersburg. pp. 36–37.
- Dubrovin, Nikolay (1871). History of war and domination of Russians in the Caucasus. The peoples inhabiting the Caucasus. Vol. 1. St. Petersburg. pp. 291, 621.
- Gadzhiev, Vladilen (1965). The role of Russia in the history of Dagestan. "Mountain sovereign prince, Tarkovsky Buday Shevkal and Kumytsky Chepalai and all city owners". Makhachkala: Nauka. p. 92.
- Peçevî, İbrahim (1988). Azărbai̐janyn vă ḣămḣu̇dud ȯlkă vă vilai̐ătlărin 1520-1640-jy illăr dȯvru̇ tarikhină dair igtibaslar. Ėlm. p. 44.
- Bakikhanov, Abbasgulu (1991). Golestan-e Eram. Baku: Elm. pp. 108–110.
- Barazbiev, Muslim (2000). Ethno-cultural relations of the Balkars and Karachays with the peoples of the Caucasus in the 18th – beginning of the 20th century. Nalchik: Elbrus. p. 105. ISBN 978-5-7680-1562-6
