= Ghazi ibn Urak =

Nogai nobleman and founder of the Lesser Nogai Horde

Ghazi
- Born: Unknown
- Died: April 1576; Kabardia
- Military career
- Allegiance: Nogai Horde (?–1552); Lesser Nogai Horde (1552–1576)
- Rank: Mirza (until 1569); Bey (after 1569)
- Conflicts: Kabardian-Kumyk War (1552-1567); Russo–Crimean Wars; Russo-Turkish War (1568–1570); Fire of Moscow (1571); Battle of Molodi; Crimean–Circassian Wars; Campaign against Circassia 1574; Campaign against Circassia 1576 †

Ghazi ibn Urak (also Kazy Mirza or Ghazi Bey) was a 16th-century Nogai nobleman and founder of the Lesser Nogai Horde. Nephew of Ismail Beg, he established an independent ulus on the Volga in 1552 and expanded his influence through raids, alliances with Crimean and Kabardian rulers, and participation in wars. He became a bey in 1569 and was killed in 1576 during a campaign against the Kabardians.

== Biography ==
The Lesser Nogai Horde, on the eastern shore of the Sea of Azov (Малые ногаи)

Ghazi ibn Urak was the son of Urak Mirza and the grandnephew of Ismail Beg. In the mid-16th century, internecine conflict erupted within the Nogai Horde among various feudal factions. Among Ismail's opponents, Ghazi emerged as the most active and formidable. In the spring of 1552, he withdrew his uluses from Ismail's control to the right bank of the Volga River and established the Lesser Nogai Horde. Initially, Russian sources referred to this ulus as "Kaziyev Ulus," while Ottoman sources called it the "Kazy Ulus" or "Little Nogai."

At first, Ghazi was described as a wandering "Cossacks" living on the steppes, a term he and his Nogais used to describe themselves to Ivan the Terrible. In 1555, he took the opportunity to invade the Transvolga region, clashing with Ismail Bey and killing the former khan of Astrakhan Khanate, Yamghurchi Khan. Over time, Ghazi's ulus transitioned from a semi-nomadic "Cossack" group into a stable political entity. He negotiated with Kabardian princes to traverse their territory and use remote mountain passes.

During this period, many Mirzas, displaced from their homelands or unwilling to submit to Ismail, migrated to the North Caucasus with hundreds of subjects and their flocks. Ismail Bey reported to Ivan IV that approximately 400 Mirzas had migrated.

As the population and military strength of the ulus grew, Ghazi's status increased. In 1569, he was granted the rank of Bey, giving the Kaziyev Ulus its own recognized leadership and transforming it into a stable political structure.

In 1560, Ghazi allied with Devlet I Giray, pledging not to attack the Crimean Khanate. In 1562, he married the daughter of Kabardian Prince Pshiapshoqo Qeytuqo, in response to Temruqo Yidar's daughter Maria Temryukovna marrying Ivan IV. Ghazi participated in the Russo-Turkish War (1568–1570), Fire of Moscow (1571), and Battle of Molodi on the side of the Crimean Tatars.

Pages of the messenger list of E. Rzhevsky with the story of the campaign of Ghazi ("Kazy-murza") against the "Kabardian Cherkassians"

In 1574, Ghazi raided Circassia, killing and enslaving many, but Devlet I Giray ordered him to return the captives and join the Tatar army preparing for a campaign against Vallachia, which Ghazi refused. In early April 1576, Ghazi launched a second campaign against the Circassians with the support of Crimean Prince Imam Giray. They attacked Kabardian lands held by the Yiar dynasty, defeating the local militia and capturing many people. That night, the Kabardians ambushed the retreating Nogais and annihilated the weakened, dismounted army. Ghazi, two of his brothers, and several sons were killed, while Imam Giray was captured; no other members of the army survived.

== See also ==
- Great Horde
- Crimean–Circassian Wars
- Nogai Horde
