= Maria Temryukovna =

Tsaritsa of Russia from 1561 to 1569

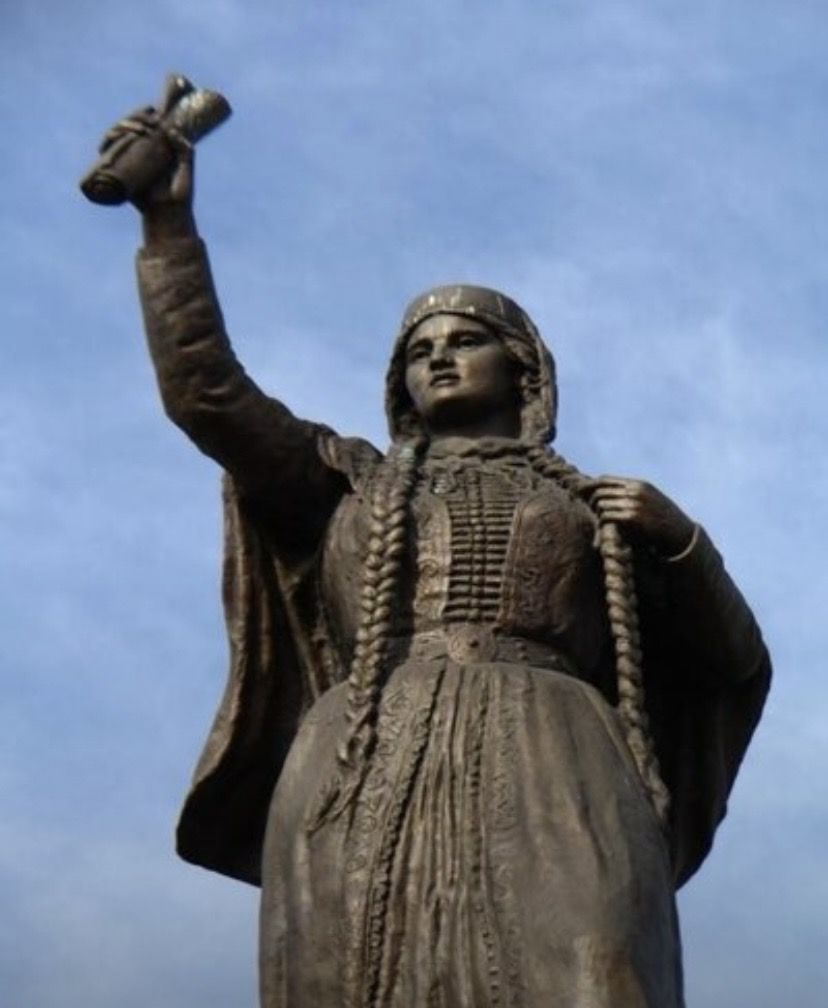

Tsaritsa consort of all Russia
- Tenure: 21 August 1561 – 1 September 1569
- Born: c. 1545; Kabardia
- Died: 1 September 1569 (aged 23–24); Alexandrov, Russia
- Burial: Ascension Convent, Kolomenskoye; Archangel Cathedral, Kremlin (1929)
- Spouse: Ivan IV of Russia
- Issue: Tsarevich Vasili Ivanovich
- Dynasty: Rurik (by marriage)
- Father: Temryuk of Kabardia

Maria Temryukovna (born Kucheney; Russian: Мари́я Темрю́ковна; Kabardian: Гуэщэней Идар Темрыкъуэ и пхъу; c. 1545 – 1 September 1569) was the tsaritsa of all Russia from 1561 until her death as the second wife of Ivan the Terrible.

== Life ==
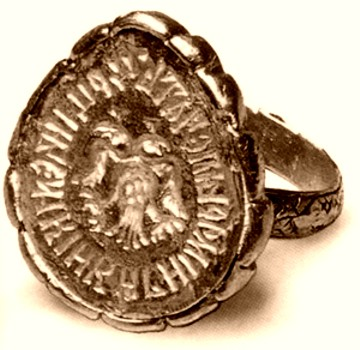
Maria Temryukovna's seal ring

Born Qochenay bint Teymour (Кученей), (Note: Also spelled "Kucheney" or "Kuchenei") the daughter of Eastern Circassian Prince Temryuk of Kabardia, she was presented to Ivan in Moscow after the death of his first wife Anastasia Romanovna. Ivan was so smitten by her beauty, that he decided to marry her immediately. Before the marriage, she was baptized and took the name Maria. On 21 August 1561, they married, four days before Ivan's 31st birthday. Maria would have been about 15. The marriage took place after the marriage negotiations between Ivan and Catherine Jagiellon of Poland fell apart.

According to some contemporary opinions, Maria was viewed as cruel, illiterate and vindictive, unable to fully integrate to the Muscovite way of life, and was considered a poor stepmother to Ivan's two sons Ivan and Feodor. Some sources claim it was she who first incited her husband to form the oprichniki. However, according to Isabel de Madariaga, most historians reject the idea that Maria, or any of his other wives, ever exercised any influence over Ivan. On 21 March 1563, she gave birth to a son named Vasili, named after her father-in-law, though he died on 3 May that same year.

In the summer of 1564, she accompanied Ivan on a pilgrimage to Pereslavl-Zalessky, where the local monks and other observers "were impressed with her modest bearing, religious proclivities, and grasp of affairs."

She died on 1 September 1569, in her early 20s. It was rumored that she had been poisoned by her own husband, but there is no historical evidence to such rumours.

== In popular culture ==
- She appears in The Terrible (2020), a Russian drama miniseries, played by Milena Radulovich.
- She appears in Tsar (2009), a Russian drama film directed by Pavel Lungin.
- She is among the main cast of the Soviet silent film The Wings of a Serf (1926). She is played by Safiyat Askarova.
- The story of Maria and Ivan is described in the book Der Leibarzt der Zarin by Heinz Konsalik.
- She also appears (as Marie) in Georges Bizet's opera Ivan IV.

== Bibliography ==
- Troyat, Henri (1987). Ivan the Terrible. Translated by Joan Pinkham. New York: Dorset Press. ISBN 978-0-88029-207-8.
- De Madariaga, Isabel (2005). Ivan the Terrible: First Tsar of Russia. New Haven London: Yale University Press. ISBN 9780300119732.
- Perrie, Maureen; Pavlov, Andrei (10 July 2014). Ivan the Terrible. England: Pearson Education Limited. ISBN 978-1-317-89468-1.

Russian royalty
Vacant Title last held by Anastasia Romanovna	Tsaritsa of all Russia; 1561–1569	Vacant Title next held by Marfa Sobakina
