= Pshiapshoqo Qeytuqo =

Prince of Qeytuqey Kabardia
- Predecessor: Qeytuqo Beslan
- Successor: Qaziy Pshiapshoqo
- Born: 1530; Kabardia
- Died: 1570's 1576 (per Khotko); Kabardia
- Issue: Sons: Qaziy; Shojenuqo
Names
- Pshiapshoqo, son of Qeytuqo
- Kabardian: Къетыкъуэ и къуэ Пщыӏэпщокъуэ
- Father: Qeytuqo Beslan
- Religion: Sunni Islam

Pshiapshoqo Qeytuqo (Note: Kabardian: Пщыӏэпщокъуэ Къетыкъуэ Russian: Пшеапшоко Кайтукович) was a Kabardian prince and the senior ruler of "Qeytuqo Kabardia" during the second half of the 16th century. Following the rise of Temruqo Yidar, Pshiapshoqo emerged as one of the most prominent Kabardian princes mentioned in contemporary historical records and played a major role in the political struggles of eastern Circassia during the expansion of Russian influence into the North Caucasus.

== Biography ==
=== Life ===
Though Pshiapshoqo Qeytuqo's birth date is unknown, Samir Khotko, based on his reconstruction of the chronology of Inal the Great, estimates that he was born around 1530. He was one of the five sons of Qeytuqo Beslan, his brothers were Aslanbech, Jansokh, Qeytuqo, and Tepshanuqo. both Aslanbech and Jansokh served as the Grand Prince of Kabardia in the 16th century

On 4 January 1588, an embassy from Kabardia arrived in Moscow, headed by Mamstruk Cherkassky and Qudenet Qambolet. The delegation reaffirmed Kabardian loyalty to the Russian state, expressed support for the restoration of the Terki Fortress, and pledged joint military action against anti-Russian factions within Kabardia. In their declaration, the envoys identified several dissident Kabardian princes and noble houses, including members of the Talostan and Qeytuqo families, accusing them of "serving the Crimean Khanate and the Shamkhalate". The Kabardian envoys further stated that they, together with Prince Qambolet and "all the Circassian (Kabardian) land," were prepared to cooperate with Russian voivodes in suppressing opposition groups, securing the Terek region, and enforcing loyalty to the Russian sovereign through the taking of hostages and pledges.

During the 1550s–1580s, Pshiapshoqo Qeytuqo appeared in historical records more frequently than any other Kabardian prince apart from Temruqo Yidar. Who controlled the region of Lesser Kabardia. As the senior prince of the "Upper Kabardia" region within Kabardia, he controlled territories in the upper Kuban and Kuma regions, the Pyatigorye area, and the Satey plain as far as the Chegem River. Sources also preserve information regarding the settlement of Pshiapshoqo's sons during the time of Qaziy Pshiapshoqo, when Greater Kabardia was commonly referred to as "Qaziy Kabardia" (Kaziev Kabarda in Russian sources) and occupied a considerable territory within the country.

Pshiapshoqo's policies were oriented toward the Crimean Khanate. Despite the ongoing Livonian War and the deterioration of Russian relations with the Shamkhalate of Tarki and the Lesser Nogai Horde, Russian policy in the North Caucasus during the mid-16th century remained comparatively active and successful. This expansion of Russian influence provoked resistance from anti-Russian factions within Kabardia, particularly among princely groups that opposed the policies of Temruqo Yidar. The principal opposition emerged from the Qeytuqo family under the leadership of Pshiapshoqo Qeytuqo, who aligned himself with the Shamkhal of Tarki and the Lesser Nogai elites, who were also oriented toward the Crimean Khanate. These tensions ultimately culminated in a revolt led by Pshiapshoqo Qeytuqo and his allies, including Ghazi ibn Urak, a Lesser Nogai prince and son-in-law of Pshiapshoqo, directed against Temruqo and his pro-Russian faction.

In the early 16th century, Prince Temruqo the Brave entered into conflict with the sons of Qeytuqo, including Aslanbech. As a result of this struggle, Temruqo was forced to migrate with his family to Lesser Kabardia. The conflict is generally considered to have stemmed from a dynastic dispute over the title of supreme prince of Kabardia. After the death of Prince Jilakhstan in the 1550s, Temruqo became the senior prince of Lesser Kabardia, and the territory under his control became known as "Yidarey".

By the early 1560s, Kabardia had become divided into two opposing political coalitions. Temruqo, supported by the Tsardom of Russia and the Greater Nogai Horde, faced a rival alliance led by Pshiapshoqo, who was backed by the Crimean Khanate, the Lesser Nogai Horde, and indirectly by the Ottoman Empire. Although Temruqo initially achieved several successes, opposition among the Kabardian princes strengthened, and in 1563 he was forced to flee Kabardia with his sons and seek refuge in Astrakhan. Ivan the Terrible soon intervened in the conflict. Temruqo received military assistance from Astrakhan consisting of approximately 500 musketeers and 500 Cossacks, a considerable force by the standards of sixteenth-century Kabardia. With this contingent, commanded by Grigory Semyonovich Pleshcheev, Temruqo managed to return and drive his rivals from his lands. Despite these setbacks, the Qeytuqo faction remained influential. In 1566 Temruqo requested that Ivan IV build a fortress on the Terek River, warning that the Qeytuqo family, led by Pshiapshoqo, continued to pose a serious threat. The Muscovite tsar approved the request and in February 1567 dispatched laborers and equipment to Kabardia for the construction of the fort. The civil war ended with Temruqo annexing all the lands owned by Pshiapshoqo located in Greater Kabardia, finally centralizing power in the state by establishing control over all of Kabardia.

The surviving documentary evidence concerning the internal conflicts of Kabardia has often been interpreted by historians as illustrating the destructive consequences of the prolonged struggle for power among the Kabardian princely houses. Later authors suggested that many losses suffered by the Kabardian population during this period might have been avoided had the rival feudal factions reached a political compromise, particularly given the efforts of Temruqo Yidar to strengthen centralized authority within Kabardia.

It is also claimed that Pshiapshoqo took place in the campaign of Crimeans against Kabardia in 1567, (Note: Crimean princes Mehmed Giray, Adil Giray, and Alp Giray (sons of Khan Devlet Giray) arrived in Kabarda "with a large army." "They waged war across the entire Circassian land, burning it, capturing wives and children, and driving away livestock and sheep." They took more than 20,000 captives. According to other sources, "the princes did not conquer the Circassians," meaning the Crimeans were expelled) however this claim is also considered wrong, As the assertion is not supported by surviving documentary evidence, despite the preservation of extensive correspondence between Temruqo's Kabardia, Moscow, and the Yidarey princes in Russian archives. At the same time, no surviving correspondence from the Ottoman Empire, the Crimean Khanate, the Lesser Nogai Horde, or Qaziy Kabardia concerning these events has been identified. The absence of references in Kabardian oral tradition to the alleged invasion of Mehmed Giray is also noted, despite later portrayals of the campaign as devastating.

=== In folklore ===
The period of civil strife also coincided with repeated incursions by neighboring peoples into Kabardian territory. In his "History of the Adyghe People", Shora Nogmov recounts an invasion by the Turguts, whom Nogmov identifies as the ancestors of the modern Kalmyks, who advanced alongside the Tatars of Tarki. According to Nogmov, the Kabardian princes "Pshiapshoqo and Qidirshoqo" were initially defeated on the Malka River before regrouping and repelling the invaders near the Psygansu River. Nogmov further attributes a series of battles on the Malka, Terek, Psygansu, and Baksan rivers, culminating in a final engagement at Kashkatau, to the participation of Pshiapshoqo Qeytuqo. However, these events are considered only legends and appear to be untrue, as the Kalmyks did not arrive the North Caucasus until the early 17th century and Pshiapshoqo's life is only documented between the 1550s and 1580s, which creates chronological issues in Nogmov's narrative regarding the lifetimes of Pshiapshoqo and Temruqo.

=== Death ===
In 1576, the forces of the Lesser Nogai bey Ghazi ibn Urak were defeated by the Kabardians led by sons of Temruqo and Sholokh Tepsaruqo. Nogai forces entered Kabardia and killed many, but they were briefly defeated by the Kabardians on their return. In addition to Ghazi ibn Urak, two of his brothers and several of his sons, as well as Iman-Girey and Chebar-Murza were murdered by the Kabardian forces during one of the battles. Pshiapshoqo Qeytuqo fought on the side of the Nogais and the Crimeans, pursuing a pro-Crimean policy. According to Khotko, Pshiapshoqo, as all Nogai forces were killed, also died in the battlefield in 1576. Pshiapshoqo was stopped being mentioned in ancient charters and sources in the 1580s. His successor was his son, Qaziy Pshiapshoqo, who gave the region its name; "Qaziy Kabardia".

== Sources ==
- Kardanov, Ch. E. (2016). Князья Кабарды [Princes of Kabarda] (in Russian). Nalchik: Izdatel'stvo M. i V. Kotlyarovykh. ISBN 978-5-93680-971-2.
- Yaşar, Murat (2022). The North Caucasus Borderland: Between Muscovy and the Ottoman Empire, 1555–1605 (PDF). Edinburgh Studies on the Ottoman Empire. Edinburgh: Edinburgh University Press. ISBN 9781474498692.
