= Lesser Nogai Horde =

16th–17th-century Nogai territory in Kuban, Eastern Europe

The Lesser Nogai Horde, on the eastern shore of the Sea of Azov (Малые ногаи)

The Lesser Nogai Horde, also called Kazyev Horde was a nomadic feudal state formation of the Nogai peoples on the right bank of the Volga and in the Azov region, separated in the second half of the 16th century from the Nogai Horde with the invasion of the Kalmyk Khanate

The lesser Nogais were nominally subject to the Crimean Khanate. They were divided into the following groups: Budjak (from the Danube to the Dniester), Yedisan (from the Dniester to the Bug), Jamboyluk (Bug to Crimea), Yedickul (north of Crimea) and Kuban. In particular, the Yedisans are mentioned as a distinct group, and in various locations

The horde was also known simply as Nogai Tatars, not to be confused with the North Nogai Horde.

In the 1630 most of the tribes were gone and ultimately conquered by kalmyk khanate.

== See also ==
- Crimean-Nogai raids into East Slavic lands
- Little Tartary

== Sources ==
- Trepalov, V. V. (2016). Usmanov, M. A. (ed.). Istoriya Nogayskoy Ordy (История Ногайской Орды) (in Russian) (2nd, rev. and exp. ed.). Kazan: Izdatelskiy dom "Kazanskaya nedvizhimost". p. 764. ISBN 978-5-9907552-5-3.
