= Kabardian Civil War (1615) =

Sholokh's Campaign in Greater Kabarda
- Part of Civil Wars in Kabardia
Date	November 11, 1615
Location	Kurkudzhin and Terek Rivers; Greater and Lesser Kabardia
Result	Lesser Kabardian victory
Territorial changes	Mass devastation of Principality of Qaziy Pshiapshoqo

Belligerents
Greater Kabardia (Principality of Qaziy) (Note: Called "Kaziev Kabarda" in Russian sources); Tsardom of Russia	Lesser Kabardia (Talostaney); Nogai Horde; Tarki Shamkhalate

Commanders and leaders
Qaziy Pshiapshoqo †; Pyshta Tepsaruqo †; Aksaq Qeytuqo †; Dokshuqo Jansokh †; Anfoq Shodjenuqo †; Qudenet Qeytuqo †; Inarmas Aslanbech †; Ivan Nagaev (POW) Second Campaign: Qul Qeytuqo; Qilish Jansokh; Chereguk Yelbezduq; Peter Priklonsky	Sholokh the Mighty; Qarashey Sholokh; Ishterek Bey; Budachai of Tarki

Strength
2,000+	Unknown; 15,000

Casualties and losses
700+ killed, many captured	Minimal

The Kurkhudzin War (Kabardian: Къулъкъужын зауэ) (Note: Kurkhudzin "War" or "Battle"), or simply the Kabardian Civil War of 1615 was a Kabardian internal conflict led by Sholokh the Mighty, the Grand Prince of Kabardia, and his son Qarashey in Lesser Kabardia against the Greater Kabardian senior prince Qaziy Pshiapshoqo. The campaign ended in an effective victory for Sholokh and death of many Greater Kabardian princes.

== Background ==
The relations between Sholokh and the princes of Qeytuqo dynasty were already bad because of Sholokh's refusal to recognise Jansokh Qeytuqo as the Grand Prince of Kabardia. When Sholokh began a struggle to be titled as the Grand Prince, Jansokh Qeytuqo, along with the Idarovich-Cherkasskys and a Russian detachment of 750 streltsy led by Grivory Poltev, invaded Sholokh's domains in Talostaney in November 1589. The allies advanced deep in the lands and ravaged more than 30 villages, thus Sholokh was forced to recognise Jansokh as the Supreme leader of Kabardia and handed over many hostages.

Sholokh, having consolidated his position as Grand Prince of Kabardia, acted to stabilize his authority within a complex regional environment. He maintained diplomatic relations with Moscow during the Time of Troubles, avoiding direct confrontation while preserving political flexibility.

In 1614, following the accession of Mikhail I of Russia, representatives of the major Kabardian princely houses entered into a formal agreement with Russian envoys, affirming cooperation and mutual obligations under terms similar to earlier charters between Kabardian rulers and Russian sovereigns. This arrangement is generally interpreted as a political alliance rather than direct subordination. At the same time, Sholokh continued active diplomatic engagement with neighboring powers, including Safavid Iran, the Crimean Khanate, and the Shamkhalate, reflecting a multi-directional foreign policy.

Internally, Sholokh faced opposition from Qaziy Pshiapshoqo and the Qeytuqo clan. In confronting this faction, he drew upon existing blood feuds involving the Qeytuqo dynasty, particularly those connected to the killings of Domanuko Temryukovich and Mamstruk Temryukovich, as part of the broader struggle for power within Kabardia. The relations between Sholokh and Qaziy Pshiapshoqo, worsened with Qazi harboring of Sholokh's rebellious brother, Pyshta Murza.

== Campaign ==
In November 11th of 1615, Sholokh together with his eldest son Qarashey, launched a major campaign against their enemy Qazy Pshiapshoqo's domain. Sholokh was supported by Ishterek Bey from the Nogai Horde and Budachai of Tarki. He led his forces deep into Qazy's domain, which was located in Greater Kabarda. He kept his advance until the Kurkhudzin River, where Qazy Shiapshoqo and Sholokh's brother Pyshta Tepsaruqo were killed in a major battle. Along with Qaziy, his nephews Aslanbech's son Inarmas, Aksak Qeytuqo, Qanoqo's son Kudenet, Jansokh's son Dokhshuqo, and Shodjenuqo's son Anfok were murdered and the Russian voivode Ivan Nagaev was wounded, then later captured by Sholokh's forces.

After devastating the lands of Qazy's Kabarda, Sholokh withdrew back to his lands with total success. But the relatives of Qazy Pshiapshoqo, Kilish Jansokh, Chereguq Yelbezduq, and Qul Qeytuqo went to Russia to ask them for help against Sholokh to get revenge. Russia gave the relatives of Pshiapshoqo a big army under the command of Peter Priklonsky. With the assistance from the military men from Russia, relatives of Pshiapshoqo invaded Talostaney, but they were ultimately stopped by the eldest son of Sholokh, Qarashey Sholokh.

Sholokh's personality and justice was immortalised in Circassian folk songs, a part of a song about Sholokh states as follows:

"Our great and mighty Sholokh, You were the bravest of all knights! Our brave swordsman, Who gave us herds of swift-footed horses! The two padishahs, seated on the throne, Who made their presence felt with the tip of your sword! On that day, he was the adornment of the world, He was the first at all gatherings!"

== See also ==
- Kabardian Civil War (1589)
- Kabardian Civil War (1601)
