= Circassian–Kumyk wars =

Series of feudal conflicts between Circasians and Kumyks in the North Caucasus

Circassian-Kumyk Wars
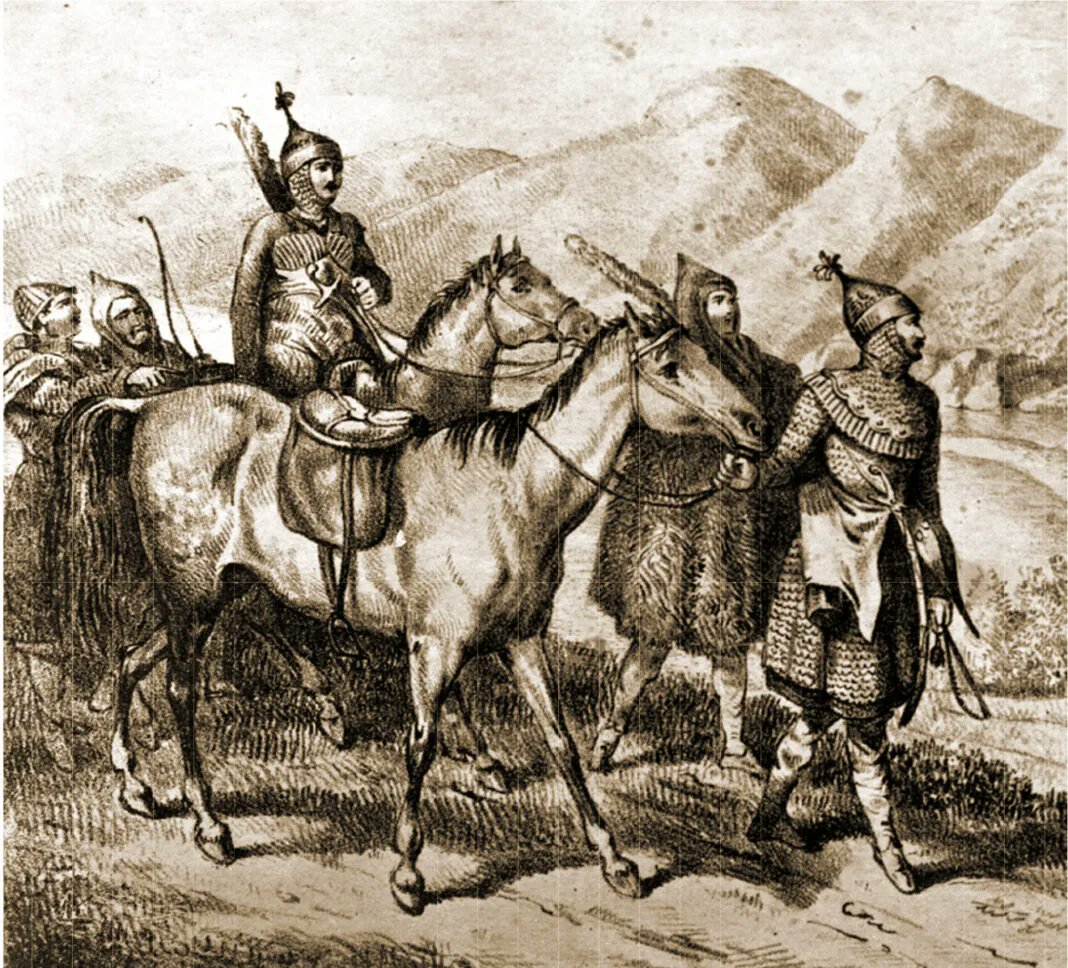
- Circassian nobles
Date	Mid-16th century – Early 18th century
Location	Sunzha region, Kabardia and Dagestan
Result	Inconclusive: • Kabardia remains independent from the Shamkhalate • Vassalisation of the Shevkalate by Russia in 1786

Belligerents
Circassian states: Kabardia; Abazashta; Principality of Besleney; Supported by: Tsardom of Russia (from 1557; Chechens	Kumyk states: Shamkhalate of Tarki; Kingdom of Endirey; Tyumen Khanate; Supported by: Chechens; Avar Khanate; Crimean Khanate; Ottoman Empire; Nogais § Battle of Malka (1641): Tsardom of Russia; Lesser Kabardia

Commanders and leaders
Qeytuqo I Beslan; Alejuqo Shojenuqo; Hatokhshoqo Qaziy; Temruqo the Brave; Vartan Ortanov; Yelzheruqo Qanoqo; Lev Achba; Hatokhshoqo Hamirza; Mutsal Cherkassky; Kilish Sauslan †; Qambolet Idar	Buday I †; Surkhay I †; Muhammad Shamkhal †; Aidemir Shamkhal †; Chopan ibn Buday; Adil-Gerey I Surkhay III Sultan-Mahmud of Endirey (WIA); Kazanalp-murza

The Circassian–Kumyk Wars or Kabardian–Kumyk Wars were a series of conflicts between the feudal lords of Kabardia, Abazins, and the Principality of Besleney supported by the Russian Empire and the Kumyks supported by Crimean allies from the mid-16th century to the early 18th century. These wars were characterized by power struggles for dominance in the North-Eastern Caucasus. The rivalry was fueled by shifting alliances with major regional powers such as Russia, the Ottoman Empire, and Safavid Iran.

== Background ==
According to 19th-century sources, the Kabardians, a branch of the Adyghe (Circassians), migrated from the Black Sea into the North Caucasus plains along the Terek and Malka rivers. Upon arrival, they encountered Tatar settlements, which they displaced toward the steppe or confined to mountain gorges. These groups later came to be identified with the Balkar and related communities.

The Kumyks, led by the Shamkhals of Tarki, viewed themselves as the rightful rulers of the North Caucasus lowlands. This led to frequent clashes with Kabardian princes who had settled along the Terek River.

== Russo-Circassian alliance and War with Buday I ==
=== Battle of Kishzhibek ===
During this period, Qanshao also persuaded the Avar Utsmi—identified in the sources as Khadan Utsmi—to invade Kabardia, whose population was reportedly weakened by internal strife. Khadan accepted and called upon his allies, including the Nogais and the Kumyks, assembling a united force against the Kabardians. In response, the Kabardians called upon their Trans-Kuban allies, the Abazins under Lev Achba and the Besleneys under Yelzheruqo Qanoqo.

Supreme command of the allied Kabardian forces was entrusted to Prince Yelzheruqo. As the Avar Utsmi crossed the Terek River, Prince Yelzheruqo and his advance guard met the invading force and attempted negotiations. After negotiations failed, Yelzheruqo withdrew to prepared defensive positions. Two days later, the Utsmi advanced toward the trenches, and Yelzheruqo engaged the enemy. A fierce battle followed, reportedly lasting two days. According to a legend preserved by the Ortan family, this battle marked the Kabardians’ first encounter with firearms. During the fighting, Kabardian forces reportedly heard a thunderous roar and observed smoke rising near Chegem. A volunteer named Vartan was said to have crossed the Chegem River at night and captured a matchlock from Dagestani troops. For this act, he was allegedly elevated to the rank of wark (noble).

On the third day, hostilities resumed. During the renewed fighting, the Utsmi was killed, causing confusion among his forces. According to the legend, the Kabardians exploited this disorder, launched a coordinated assault, and drove the opposing army toward the Terek River. It is claimed that only one-third of the invading force managed to escape. In the course of the battle, Prince Koshkao, described as one of the instigators of the campaign, was also killed. The battle thereafter became known as Kishzhibek, a name interpreted as meaning “salvation lies not in stone walls, but in the courage of men.” The battle is commemorated in the following traditional song:

Our mowers have postponed their work until next summer, and our ripe millet has been destroyed by wild boars.

Our herdsmen galloped home on bare saddles. Our young women wept bitterly.

Our people were worn out from the constant walking into the gorges; even the iron boilers were damaged on the road.

We placed our hopes on the Chegem trenches, stood ready for battle, and our princes inspected the Kishzhibek positions.

Utsmiy was eager for battle! A bloody battle began; our two detachments of troops joined forces in the fortifications.

The blood of the enemies flowed like a wide stream, and the corpses of the slain enemies lay on the ground like a wooden bridge.

Although Circassian folklore does not provide a specific date for the battle, epigraphic evidence offers a chronological indication. In the cemetery of the Shamkhal clan in Gazi-Kumukh, a tombstone inscription commemorating Muhammad, son of Amal-Muhammad—described as “killed in battle with the infidel Circassians”—has been preserved and is dated to the month of Muharram 960 AH (27 December 1552 – 24 January 1553). A similar date appears in the epitaph of another individual from the village of Richa. Based on these inscriptions, the battle is generally dated to approximately 1552.

=== Russian intervention ===
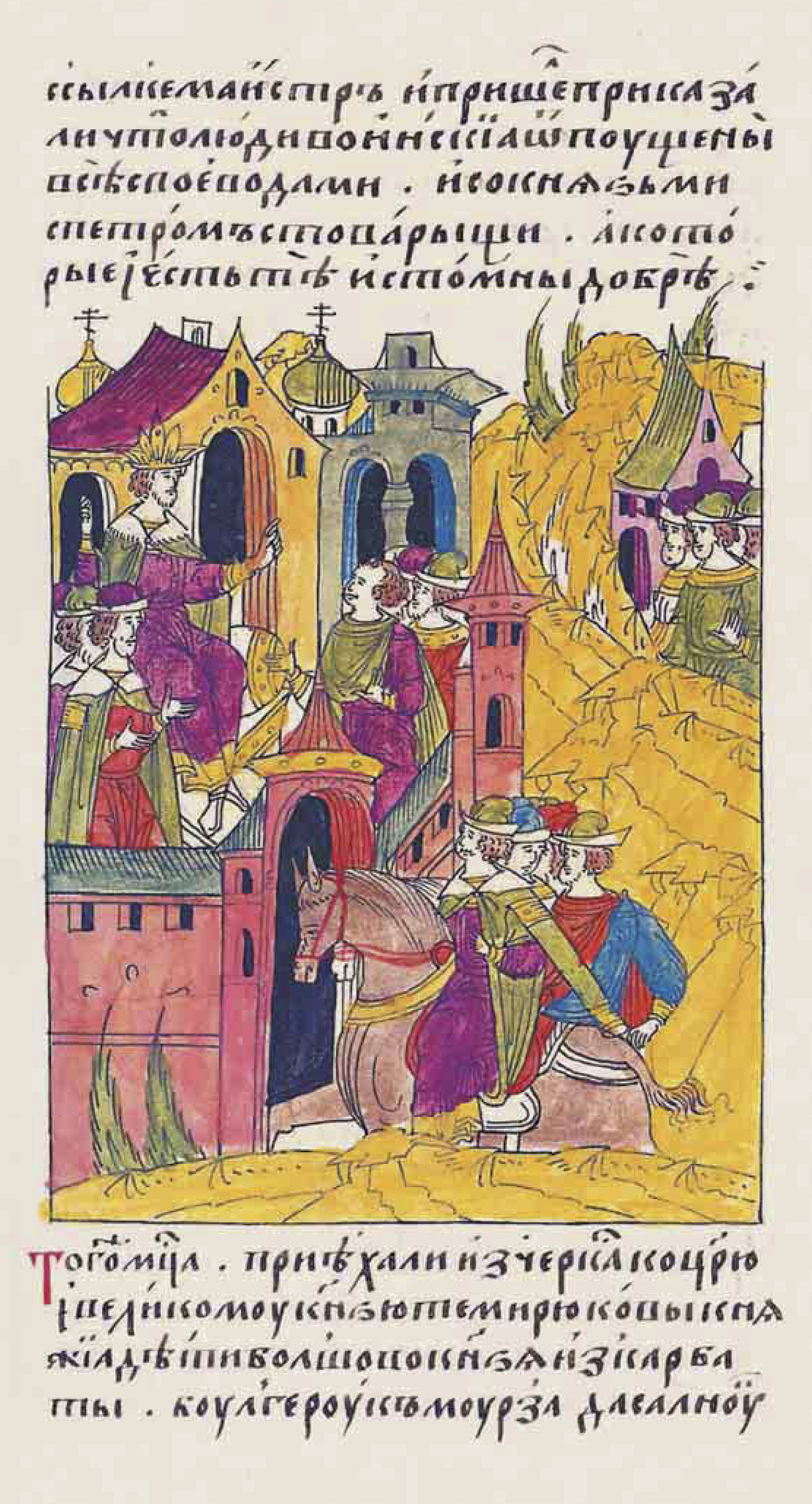
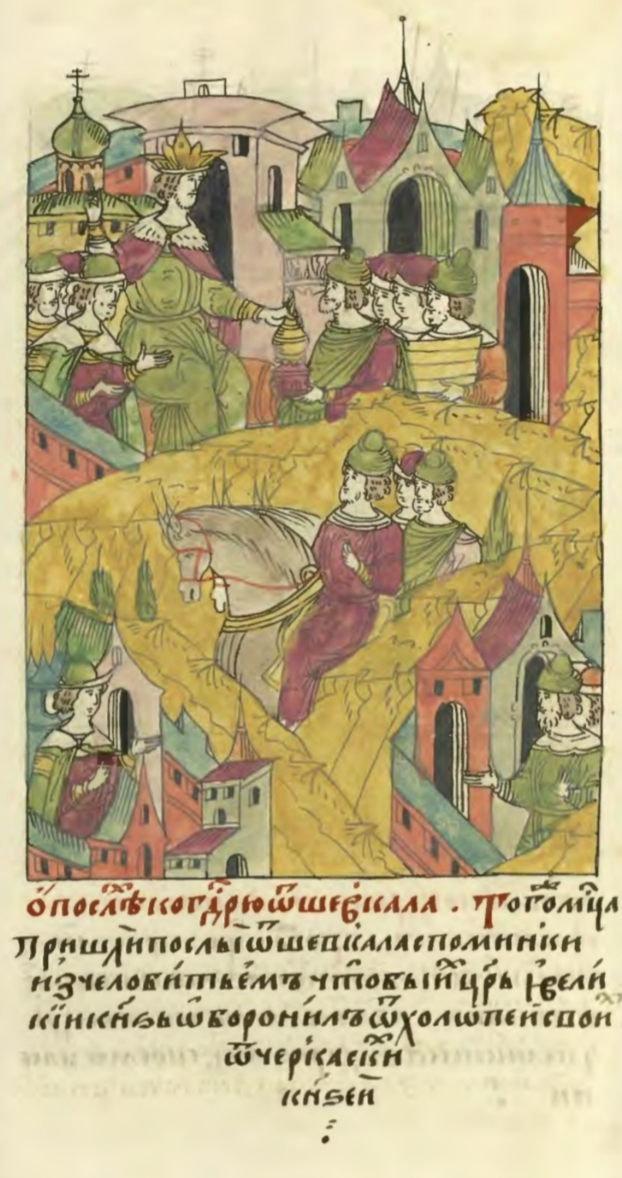
Arrival of Circassian (left) and Kumyk (right) ambassadors to Moscow

In July 1557, the Circassian mirza Kavklych Kanukov (Qanqilish Qanoqo) arrived at the court of Ivan the Terrible, requesting protection against the Kumyks. A similar appeal was made in October 1558 by the sons of Temruqo the Brave—Bulgeruk and Saltankul. According to the sources, information about these negotiations was communicated to the Kumyks, and in 1559 a Kumyk embassy arrived at the Russian court requesting protection from Circassian princes who had entered Russian allegiance. However, complaints received from the Kabardian Circassians accused the Kumyks of conducting raids against them. In response, the Russian government dispatched a military expedition against the Shamkhalate of Tarki in support of the Kabardians.

In the summer of 1560, an army under the voevoda I. S. Cheremisinov departed from Astrakhan by sea. Transported on vessels—likely strug boats—the force sailed along the western coast of the Caspian Sea toward Tarki, the center of the Tarki Shamkhalate. According to the chronicles, Cheremisinov’s army included streltsy, Cossacks, and the so-called “Astrakhan people.” After landing near Tarki, Cheremisinov reportedly led an assault on the settlement, located approximately two kilometers from the coast, and captured it within half a day. The voevoda did not attempt to retain control of the town; instead, it was plundered and burned.

The Russian attack on Tarki led Caucasologist E. N. Kusheva to suggest that by the mid-16th century Tarki had already emerged as the political center of the Shamkhalate. The defense of the town was reportedly led by the shamkhal himself, who retreated into the mountains following the defeat. Although his name is not recorded in the Russian chronicles, researcher L. I. Lavrov, relying on epigraphic evidence, proposed that he may have been Buday I ibn Umal-Muhammad.

The objectives and overall outcome of the 1560 campaign remain a subject of scholarly debate. Some historians argue that the planned capture of Tyumen and the Shamkhalate of Tarki was not accomplished, and that I. S. Cheremisinov did not reach Kabardia. It has also been suggested that even Russian sources do not characterize the campaign as a clear victory, and that Cheremisinov may have been forced to withdraw by the shamkhal. According to this interpretation, the voevoda’s failure to carry out the tsar’s directives—namely the capture of Tyumen and the Shamkhalate and the advance to link up with the Kabardians—indicates that the campaign did not achieve its intended strategic objectives. At the same time, it is noted that the rulers of the Shamkhalate perceived the northern advance as a serious threat to their independence.

=== Final battle ===
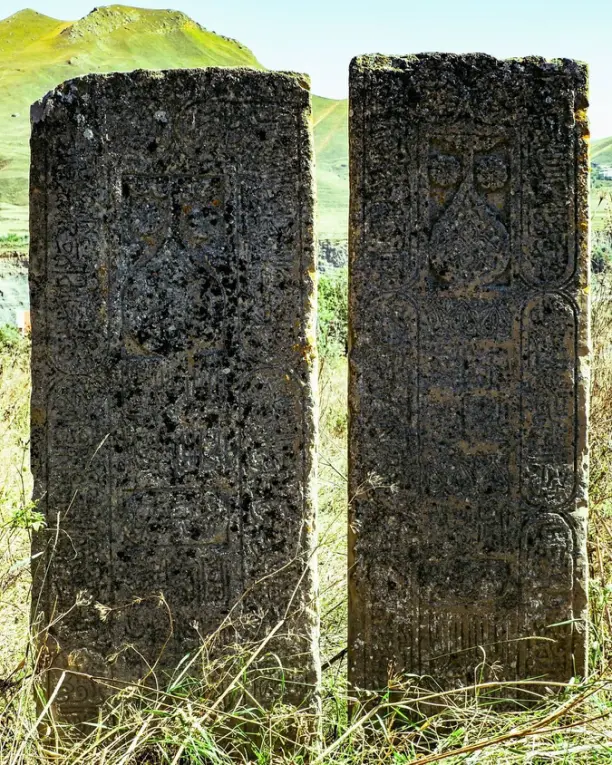
The grave of Buday I and his brother Surkhai

In 1567, the shamkhal Buday I intervened in the ongoing feudal conflict within Kabardia between the senior prince Temruqo Idar and the rival claimant Shiapshiqo Qeytuqo. Taking advantage of this internal division, Buday aligned himself with Qeytuqo and marched into Kabardian territory with a military detachment. His intervention formed part of the broader struggle for influence in the northeastern Caucasus, where regional rulers frequently involved themselves in the dynastic disputes of neighboring polities.

A major battle subsequently took place between the faction of rulers led by Temruqo Idar and the coalition supporting Shiapshiqo Qeytuqo. In addition to the forces of the shamkhal, the ruler of Lesser Nogai, Ghazi ibn Urak, joined Qeytuqo’s side. The confrontation represented not only an internal Kabardian succession struggle but also a wider contest between regional powers seeking to influence Kabardian affairs. The battle ended in a decisive victory for Temruqo Idar. Shamkhal Buday was killed during the fighting, along with his brother.

His death marked a significant setback for the Shamkhalate’s involvement in Kabardian politics and weakened its immediate capacity to shape events in the region through direct military intervention. Further evidence of losses sustained by the ruling house of the Shamkhalate during this period is preserved in epigraphic material from the cemetery of the Shamkhal clan in Gazi-Kumukh. Tombstone inscriptions record the deaths of two additional sons of Amal-Muhammad—Buday-shamkhal and Surkhai—who are described as having been killed in “battle with the infidels” in 974 AH (1566–1567). This date corresponds chronologically with the construction of the first Russian fortress on the Terek River, an event that significantly altered the balance of power in the region. According to some researchers, these individuals likely died in attempts to hinder or resist the establishment of the Russian fortifications.

== Campaigns and Invasions Mid-17th century ==
=== Campaigns of 1635 ===
In 1635, Aidemir Shamkhal launched a devastating campaign against Kabardian settlements, killing Kabardian leader Klych Murza and devastating the region.

=== Kumyk Invasions and Kazanalp’s Reign (1646) ===
Following Aidemir's death, Kazanalp ibn Sultan-Mahmud continued the campaigns. In 1646, Kazanalp attacked the estate of Kabardian prince Mutsal Cherkassky, killing villagers, seizing livestock, and taking captives.

=== Russian Campaign in Dagestan (1604–1605) ===
In 1604–1605, Russia undertook a new major campaign in Dagestan under the command of Buturlin and Pleshcheyev with significant forces. Along with Russian troops, the campaign included the forces of the Kabardian Murza Suncheley Yanglychev and Chechen-Ingush detachments under the command of Batai-Murza Okotsky. Simultaneously, ambassadors A. Tatishchev and A. Ivanov were sent to Georgia. They were to inform Alexander about the campaign against the Shamkhal and to negotiate that the Tsar of Georgia, for his part, would send troops to Dagestan.

Russian troops, meeting no resistance, occupied Endirey and Tepli Vody and founded a fortress on the Tuzluk River. The Shamkhal, described as an "ancient old man, deprived of sight," fled to the mountains. Russian troops occupied Tarki and immediately began constructing a fortification, naming it "New City".

== Battle of Malka (1641) ==
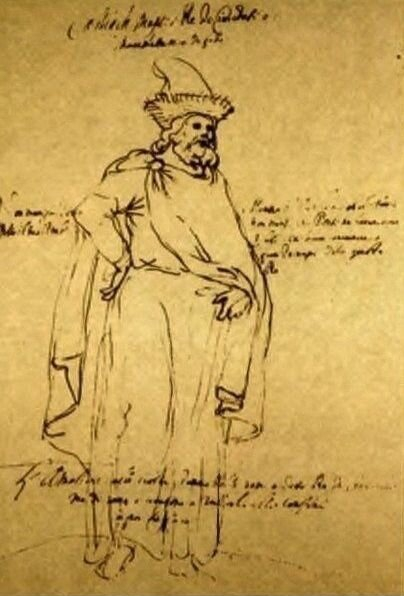
Alejuqo Shojenuqo

=== Background ===
In the early 17th century, Kabarda experienced intense internal strife, with rival princely families vying for dominance. The Idars, supported by Moscow, sought to consolidate power and secure the title of pchyshkhue (Great Prince) exclusively within their lineage. This triggered opposition from the Qaziy's, aligned with the Crimean Khanate, Lesser Nogai Horde, and influential Kumyk leaders from the Shamkhalate of Tarki.

By 1641, tensions escalated following the assassination of Mudar Alkazov, a relative and ally of the Idars. Seeking revenge, Kelamet Kudenet rallied a coalition consisting of Kabardian forces, Nogai detachments, Russian troops from the Terek fortress, and Kumyk allies. Meanwhile, the Qaziys, led by Alejuqo Shojenuqo, formed their own coalition with the Lesser Nogai Horde and other regional powers.

=== Battle ===
The battle occurred near the Malka River, with the Idar-led coalition positioned defensively. Their forces, numbering approximately 3,500, included:

- Kabardian warriors from the Idars
- Kumyk contingents from the Shamkhalate of Tarki
- Nogai troops under the command of Saltanash Aksakov and Khoroshay Chubarmametov
- A Russian detachment of 500 soldiers, including Streltsy, Greben Cossacks, and Terek-based garrison troops.

Despite their numerical strength, the Idar coalition suffered a devastating defeat. Key leaders such as Kelamet Kudenet, Aidemir-Shamkhal, and Russian commander Artemy Shishmarev were killed in the battle. The Qaziy faction's forces, supported by the Lesser Nogai Horde, overwhelmed their opponents, securing a decisive victory.

=== Aftermath ===
The outcome of the Battle of the Malka significantly altered the political landscape in Kabarda. The Qaziy faction's victory reinforced their influence in the region and weakened the Moscow-backed Idar faction. This shift played a crucial role in shaping Kabarda's internal politics and relations with neighboring powers, including the Crimean Khanate and Russia.

== Circassian-Kumyk wars in 18th century ==
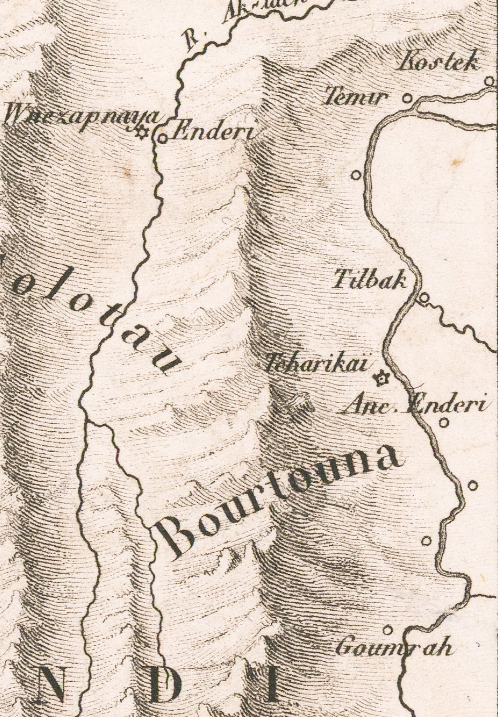
Map of Endirey

=== 1712: Kumyk-Chechen Campaign Against Kabarda ===
In 1712, Kumyk and Chechen forces, led by Sultan-Mahmud of Endirey, attempted to bring Kabarda under the control of the Crimean Khanate. The campaign ultimately failed due to Kabardian resistance.

=== 1720s: Russian Influence Grows ===
By the 1720s, Peter I of Russia intensified his efforts to weaken the Kumyk rulers. A Russian-supported faction in Kabarda gradually gained dominance, reducing Kumyk influence.

=== 1745: Kumyk Mediation in Kabardian Feuds ===
In 1745, Kumyk rulers such as Alish Hamzin and Alibek Sultan-Mahmudov acted as mediators in internal Kabardian feuds, demonstrating their continued influence in regional politics.

== Incomplete list of raids ==
- 1552–1553: Muhammad-Shamhal, son of Shamkhal Amal-Muhammad, was killed in battle by the Kabardians.
- 1567: Budai-shamkhal, the brother of the deceased Muhammad-Shamkhal, was also killed in battle by the Kabardians.
- 1557: Kabarda swore allegiance to the Russian Empire after repeated appeals for protection from the Crimean Khanate, Nogais, and Kumyks.
- 1591: Force of 5000 Russian musketeers and 10,000 Cherkesses captured and razed Andreyevo (Note: Andreyevo is an alternative name for Endirey.) in 1591, wounding the shamkhal.
- 1588–1604 Kabardian princes participate in Russian campaigns (1588, 1589, 1604) against the Shamkhalate of Tarki.
- 1605: The Kumyk forces inflicted a defeat on the Russian-Kabardian army, weakening Moscow's influence in the Caucasus.
- 1635: Aidamir-shamkhal launched a punitive raid on Kabarda, killing Prince Klych Sauslanov and capturing many prisoners.
- 1641: Aidamir-shamkhal again attacked Kabarda but was defeated in a battle on the Malki River and was killed, along with many of his warriors and allies.
- 1646: Kazanalp-murza, the son of Sultan-Mahmud, carried out a raid on the lands of Kabardian prince Mutsal Cherkassky, ravaging villages and capturing prisoners.
- 1643: Kazanalp Endireevsky raid on Kabardia, Kabardians lost.
- 1646: Kazanalp-murza devastated the lands of Mutsal Cherkassky, a loyal vassal of the Russian Tsar, taking away people, horses, and cattle.
- 1700s: The Shamkhalate of Tarki lost control over Kabarda. However, many Kumyk villages remained in the region, including Endirey (now Terskoye), Chereksk, Kyzyl-Yar, and Bekish-Yurt.

== Aftermath ==
By the mid-18th century, Russian control over the region solidified. While Kumyk rulers maintained local power, they were increasingly subordinated to Russian interests.

== See also ==
- Kabardia
- Shamkhalate of Tarki
- North Caucasus
- Caucasus War

== Sources ==
- Shikhaliev, Sh. (2024). "Confrontation between Shamkhalate and Kabarda in the 16th century (the issue of international relations in the North Caucasus)". Minbar. Islamic Studies (in Russian).
- Kotlyarov, Victor (2014). Загадки Кабардино-Балкарии (PDF) (in Russian). Nalchik.
- Akbiev, Arsen Soltanmuradovich (2015). "Соперничество кумыкских и кабардинских феодальных владетелей за гегемонию на Северо-Восточном Кавказе во 2-й половине XVI-1-й половине XVIII века". Известия СОИГСИ (in Russian).
