= Kabardian Civil War (1589) =

- Part of Civil Wars in Kabardia
Date	November 21st, 1589
Location	Kabardia, North Caucasus
Result	Disputed (See Aftermath): Jansokh recognised as the Grand Prince of Kabardia by Russia, but not within Kabardia.

Belligerents
Pro-Moscow pact: Greater Kabardia; Qeytuqeys; Idarey Principality; Military support: Tsardom of Russia	Anti-Moscow pact: Lesser Kabardia; Talostaney; Jilakhstaney; Diplomatic support: Crimean Khanate; Ottoman Empire; Tarki Shamkhalate

Commanders and leaders
Jansokh Qeytuqo; Qaziy Pshiapshoqo; Aslanbech I Qeytuqo; Mamstruk Cherkassky; Qudenet Qambolet; Grivory Poltev	Sholokh Tepsaruq (surrendered); Alkhas Jamirza

Strength
750 Streltsys; 4,500 First-class cavalry	Not more than 2,000 horsemen

Casualties and losses
Unknown	Extremely heavy: 30 villages ravaged

The Kabardian Civil War (1589) was a power struggle within Kabardia between the Pro-Russian faction including the Qeytuqo and Idarey dynasty led by Jansokh Qeytuqo, supported by the Tsardom of Russia against the Talostaney faction led by Sholokh Tepsaruqo allied with the Jilakhstan prince Alkhas, supported by their Ottoman–Crimean–Shamkhal allies.

== Background ==
The last decade of the 16th century was a period in which the North Caucasus became the center of geopolitical rivalry among major powers. Due to the Ottoman–Safavid War of 1578–1590, the region turned into both a staging ground and transit route for Ottoman and Crimean forces advancing into the South Caucasus. During this period, the Tsardom of Moscow sought to maintain its influence in the region by constructing strategic military fortresses along the Terek River.

Diplomatic contacts between Kabardia and Moscow stalled after the death of Grand Prince Temruqo Yidar, but were revived in 1577 under the leadership of Temruqo's brother, Qambolet Yidar. Unlike the earlier period of the 1550s–1560s, this new phase saw not only the Yidarey dynasty, but also other influential princely families such as the Qeytuqo's and Talostaney's sending envoys to Moscow and participating in the diplomatic process. This indicates that the Yidareys' diplomatic monopoly over relations with Moscow was beginning to weaken.

In July 1588, an oath of allegiance (shert) was signed between the Yidarey family and Tsar Ivan Fedorovich of Russia, forming the main legal basis of the 1589 crisis. The main provisions of the agreement included:

- Union with Russia: Moscow pledged to place Kabardia under its protection and defend the Yidareys against external enemies.
- Military Fortification: A fortress was built on the Terek River, garrisoned by Russian troops equipped with firearms.
- Subjugation of Rivals: The Yidareys undertook the obligation to force Kabarda's most powerful internal rivals —Sholokh Tepsaruqo, Aslanbech I Qeytuqo and Jansokh Qeytuqo— into submission under Russian authority and to take hostages (amanats) from them.

At the time, Kabarda was divided into four main feudal units: the Yidarey, Qeytuqo, Talostaney, and Jilakhstaney dynasties. In terms of military strength and population, the Qeytuqo's and Talostaney's controlled roughly two-thirds of Kabarda's total power.

The immediate trigger of the crisis was the death of Grand Prince Qambolet Yidar in early 1589. His death created a conflict between the traditional system of succession and the new political order the Yidareys sought to establish with Russian support. According to traditional law, the succession of grand princely authority was claimed to belong to Aslanbech I of Kabardia, while Sholokh Tepsaruqo, the Talostaney leader —widely respected and celebrated in heroic epics— emerged as one of the strongest contenders. The Yidareys, aiming to protect their own clan interests and fulfill their obligations under the 1588 agreement, involved Russian military power in this succession struggle.

== The campaign ==
In November 1589, a coalition of the Qeytuqo and Idarey factions launched a coordinated military campaign against the Principality of Talostaney owned by Sholokh Tepsaruqo, because of his political rivalry with Russia. They were supported by approximately 750 Russian Cossack troops sent from the Terek voivodeship under the command of Grigory Poltev. The operation aimed to eliminate Talostaney resistance and prevent outside influence from Ottoman, Crimean, and Kumyk-aligned forces. The allied forces held a significant numerical advantage, fielding around 4,500 cavalry compared to Talostaney's estimated 2,000 horsemen. The campaign was conducted rapidly and with heavy destruction. Contemporary accounts describe the burning or capture of more than 30 out of roughly 40 settlements in Talostaney territory. Sholokh Tepsaruqo's forces were decisively defeated. He was forced to submit, and compelled to recognize Jansokh Qeytuqo's authority as the Grand Prince of Kabardia. he handed over hostages, including his son and twenty other nobles.

The event is reported as follows:

"By the sovereign's order, I came to Kabarda on November 21st to the sovereign's disobedient people, who did not want to be under the sovereign's hand, but maintained friendship with the Turkish people and the Crimean Tsar and with Shevkal and the Kumyk people ... And I came with the sovereign's people with a fiery battle, and with me the Circassian army, I fought and burned and brought all the Kabardian land under the sovereign's hand and cleared the way to you and released your ambassadors from Kabarda to you."

== Aftermath ==
The political crisis of 1589 seemed to have ended in complete victory for the Idareys and Qeytuqey's, as Sholokh could not be elected as the Grand Prince of Kabardia. However, This victory remained temporary, as A. I. Lobanov-Rostovsky's Genealogy directly speaks of Jansokh Qeytuqo as cited:

"The principality was given to him in Moscow under Tsar Feodor Ivanovich of all Russia, as he was in Moscow, but in Kabarda they did not give him a principality"

Meaning, he was formally recognised as the Grand Prince of Kabardia by Russia, but the Kabardian council did not accept him as one. He visited Moscow in 1592 and apparently only then officially received the charter for the principality. But even after this, his recognition in Kabarda as a legitimate Grand Prince did not occur.

== See also ==
- Kabardian Civil War (1601)
- Kabardian Civil War (1615)

== Sources ==
- Kozhev, Zaurbek A. (2023). "Internal Political Crisis in the Kabarda in 1589: Background, Historical Context, Implications" [Внутриполитический кризис в Кабарде 1589 г.: предпосылки, исторический контекст, последствия]. Электронный Журнал «Кавказология» / Caucasology (in Russian) (4): 40–54. doi:10.31143/2542-212X-2023-4-40-54.
