= Qaziy Pshiapshoqo =

Prince of Qaziy Kabardia
- Predecessor: Pshiapshoqo Qeytuqo
- Successor: Alejuqo Shojenuqo
- Born: 16th century Kabardia
- Died: November 11th 1615; Kabardia
- Issue: Sons: Hatokhshoqo (Note: ХьэтIохъущокъуэ); Jembulat (Note: Джамболат); Misost (Note: Мысост); Yislam (Note: Ислъам)
Names
- Qaziy, son of Pshiapshoqo
- Kabardian: Пщыӏэпщокъуэ и къуэ Къазый
- Father: Pshiapshoqo Qeytuqo
- Religion: Sunni Islam

Qaziy Pshiapshoqo (Note: Kabardian: Пщыӏэпщокъуэ Къазый) was the ruling Kabardian prince of Qaziy Kabardia who played a prominent role in the political and military affairs of Kabardia during the late 16th and early 17th centuries. He participated in the 1578 Kabardian embassy to Moscow and later emerged as one of the leading figures of the Qeytuqo faction during the succession struggles that followed the death of Grand Prince Qambolet Yidar. He took part in the major internal conflicts of 1589, 1601, and 1615, and after the civil war of 1601 became the dominant leader of the Qeytuqo faction during a period in which it held political predominance in Greater Kabardia. He was killed in the Battle of the Kurkhudzin River on 11 November 1615 during the Kabardian Civil War.

== Biography ==
Qaziy Pshiapshoqo is first mentioned in surviving historical records in 1569. In the spring of 1578, he participated in a major Kabardian embassy to Moscow alongside Qambolet Yidar, the Grand Prince of Kabardia and brother of Temruqo Yidar, and Sosruqo Tepsaruqo of Talostaney. According to historian E. N. Kusheva, the delegation represented Kabardia as a whole and petitioned the Russian government to construct a fortress at the mouth of the Sunzha River. The envoys also requested that military commanders, carpenters, and artillery units be dispatched to garrison the settlement and assist in defending Kabardia against incursions by the Crimean Khanate and other neighboring adversaries.

Following the death of the grand prince Qambolet Yidar in the autumn of 1589, a period of political instability emerged in Kabardia. In response, the Kabardian nobility elected Jansokh Qeytuqo as the new Grand Prince. After his election, Jansokh convened a khasa (council), attended by the Yidarey and Qeytuqey princely families, Tlekotleshi (Note: First degree nobility in Kabardia) Anzorey family, as well as other princes, nobles, and representatives from across Kabardia. During the assembly, those present reaffirmed their shert (oath of allegiance) to the Russian state.

In 1578, Tsar Ivan the Terrible sent a letter to Mamstruk Cherkassky, who had been released from Crimean captivity, and Qaziy Pshiapshiqo, inviting them to take part in the Livonian War.

The reaffirmation of Kabardia's ties with Moscow was followed by a formal oath of allegiance at the city of Terek, witnessed by the Russian ambassadors to Georgia, Prince Semyon G. Zvenigorodsky and clerk Torkh Antonov. During the ceremony, the Kabardian princes pledged to escort the embassy through the Darial Gorge. To secure safe passage, the ambassadors also sought the cooperation of the local princes Sholokh Tepsaruqo and Alkhas Jamirza, whose territories lay along the route and who were to receive royal charters and financial stipends from the Russian government.

Neither Sholokh nor Alkhas attended the council, requiring the ambassadors to summon them separately to the Sunzha region. Negotiations were complicated by Sholokh's political ties with the Crimean Khanate, as he had married his daughter to the Crimean Khan and received a stipend from the Ottoman Sultan. Contemporary documents nevertheless indicate that the Yidarey and Qeytuqey princes—including Mamstruk Temruqo and Qaziy Pshiapshoqo—maintained peaceful relations and remained loyal to Moscow during 1578–1579, Later events, however, suggest that this relationship did not remain unchanged.

=== Disputes of 1589 ===
Mamstruk and Dumanuk Temruqo were regarded in Russia as worthy successors to their father, Temruqo the Brave, with Mamstruk in particular being noted for his courage, physical stature, and strength. In November 1589, a coalition of the Qeytuqo and Idarey factions launched a coordinated military campaign against the Principality of Talostaney owned by Sholokh Tepsaruqo, because of his political rivalry with Russia. They were supported by approximately 750 Russian Cossack troops sent from the Terek voivodeship under the command of Grigory Poltev. The operation aimed to eliminate Talostaney resistance and prevent outside influence from Ottoman, Crimean, and Kumyk-aligned forces. The allied forces held a significant numerical advantage, fielding around 4,500 cavalry compared to Talostaney's estimated 2,000 horsemen. The campaign was conducted rapidly and with heavy destruction. Contemporary accounts describe the burning or capture of more than 30 out of roughly 40 settlements in Talostaney territory. Sholokh Tepsaruqo's forces were decisively defeated. He was forced to submit, and compelled to recognize Jansokh Qeytuqo's authority as the Grand Prince of Kabardia. he handed over hostages, including his son and twenty other nobles. The event is reported as follows:

"By the sovereign's order, I came to Kabarda on November 21st to the sovereign's disobedient people, who did not want to be under the sovereign's hand, but maintained friendship with the Turkish people and the Crimean Tsar and with Shevkal and the Kumyk people ... And I came with the sovereign's people with a fiery battle, and with me the Circassian army, I fought and burned and brought all the Kabardian land under the sovereign's hand and cleared the way to you and released your ambassadors from Kabarda to you."

On 25 April 1591, Mamstruk Temruqo dispatched two of his uzdens to Moscow to escort the Georgian ambassadors. At the same time, Alkhas, the son of Sholokh Tepsaruqo, departed from Moscow accompanied by seven uzdens and four envoys representing Jansokh Qeytuqo.

=== Disputes of 1601 ===
Mamstruk was chosen by Russia as the Grand Prince of Kabardia, but could not be elected within Kabardia, as "Genealogy of Kabardian princes and murzas of the 17th century" by A.I. Lobanov-Rostovsky states that;

"Mastryuk-prince, the sovereign (Russia) granted him the Kabardian principality, but in Kabarda he was not given a principality".

As, at the time, Jansokh Qeytuqo was still alive and ruling Kabardia, thus Mamstruk could not claim the title of Grand Prince.

During this period, leading members of the Idarey dynasty, including Domanuk and Mamstruk Temryukovich Cherkassky, were murdered and taverns of the Principality of Idarey within Kabardia was captured by the Qeytuqo family, leading to the disintegration of the Idarey Principality. According to contemporary accounts, they had been invited to a feast, where they were held for several days and then killed. This incident was not a sudden act, but a planned political move, meant to remove rivals and take control of their followers and lands. The attack is linked to Qaziy Pshiapshoqo of the Qeytuqo family.

A report sent in October 1601 by Russian officials on the Terek River describes the situation in Kabarda at the time. It shows that the region was politically divided and that many local princes were not loyal to the Russian state. The report confirms the killing of Idarey leaders and mentions changing alliances between different factions, including the exchange of hostages to secure agreements. These events happened during a time of change in Russia after the death of Feodor Ioannovich and the rule of Boris Godunov. During this period, people connected to the previous ruling family lost influence. One of them, Boris Kambulatovich Cherkassky (previously Qarashey, the son of Qambolet Idar), was arrested, exiled, and died in 1601. This weakened the position of the Idareys, who had strong ties with Russia.

After the killings, a new balance of power appeared in Kabardia, sometimes called "Kaziev Kabarda," led by Qaziy Pshiapshoqo and the Qeytuqey's. This period lasted for about three years and weakened the Idarey family. Some members of the Idarey dynasty migrated closer to the Terek River under Russian protection, where a new center of power began to form. At the same time, the Qeytuqeys and Talostaneys formed an agreement, strengthened by exchanging hostages. This alliance was against both the remaining Idareys and Russian influence in the region.

The return of Qaziy Pshiapshoqo to Kabardia, who migrated to Besleney around 1601, fearing revenge from the Yidarey dynasty, apparently occurred around 1604. During these 3 years the Yidarey principality started reappearing in Kabardia as an appanage, but for a very long time its owners remained in the shadow of Sanjalay Qanqilich, who relied directly on the military resources of the Terek city and the Russian state. A partial restoration of the Yidarey's influence in Kabardia occurred only after the Romanovs came to power in the Russian Tsardom. The cousin of Mikhail Fedorovich, Ivan Borisovich Cherkassky, son of Boris (Qarashey) Kambulatovich, and another representative of the Yidarey family, Dmitry (Qanshau) Mamstryukovich, son of Ivan the Terrible's brother-in-law, who was killed in Kabardia, rose to the forefront of the ruling elite of the Russian state. The strengthening of the Yidareys' position in Russia under the government of Mikhail Fedorovich and his father, Filaret, correlates with the recent major successes of this princely house in Kabardia. The secondary rise of the Yidar dynasty occurred not so much due to the strengthening of their resource base and the demographic parameters of the Yidarey, but rather due to favorable domestic political circumstances.

In 1614, the princes and nobles of Greater and Lesser Kabardia renewed their shert to the Russian state. Those who participated included Sholokh Tepsaruqo, the grand prince of Lesser Kabardia; Qudenet Qambolet and Nartshu Yelbezduqo of the Yidarey family; Qaziy Pshiapshoqo of Greater Kabarda; and Mudar Alkhas and Aytech Qosh of Jilakhstaney from Lesser Kabardia. Prince Shanjalay Qanqilich of Terek played an active role in the negotiations.

On 20 December 1614, Tara Alejuqo, an uzden of Aytech Jilakhstan, arrived in Terek and reported that Nogais from the Oshtrekov ulus had raided Qaziy Pshiapshoqo's lands, abducting young Kabardian men and women. Upon learning of the raid, Qaziy gathered his army and pursued the attackers, destroying the Nogai raiding party and forcing them to retreat.

=== Civil war of 1615 and death ===
Sholokh, having consolidated his position as Grand Prince of Kabardia, acted to stabilize his authority within a complex regional environment. He maintained diplomatic relations with Moscow during the Time of Troubles, avoiding direct confrontation while preserving political flexibility. Internally, Sholokh faced opposition from Qaziy Pshiapsoqo and the Qeytuqo clan. In confronting this faction, he drew upon existing blood feuds involving the Qeytuqo dynasty, particularly those connected to the killings of Domanuko Temryukovich and Mamstruk Temryukovich, as part of the broader struggle for power within Kabardia. The relations between Sholokh and Qaziy Pshiapshoqo, worsened with Qaziy harboring of Sholokh's rebellious brother, Pyshta Tepsaruqo.

In November 11th of 1615, Sholokh together with his eldest son Qarashey, launched a major campaign against their enemy Qaziy Pshiapshoqo's domain. Sholokh was supported by Ishterek Bey from the Nogai Horde and Budachai of Tarki. He led his forces deep into Qazy's domain, which was located in Greater Kabarda. He kept his advance until the Kurkhudzin River, where Qaziy Pshiapshoqo and Sholokh's brother Pyshta Tepsaruqo were killed in a major battle. Along with Qaziy, his nephews Aslanbech's son Inarmas, Aksak Qeytuqo, Qanoqo's son Kudenet, Jansokh's son Dokhshuqo, and Shodjenuqo's son Anfoqo were murdered and the Russian voivode Ivan Nagaev was wounded, then later captured by Sholokh's forces.

After devastating the lands of Qaziy's Kabarda, Sholokh withdrew back to his lands with total success. But the relatives of Qaziy Pshiapshoqo, Kilish Jansokh, Chereguq Yelbezduq, and Qul Qeytuqo went to Russia to ask them for help against Sholokh to get revenge. Russia gave the relatives of Pshiapshoqo a big army under the command of Peter Priklonsky. With the assistance from the military men from Russia, relatives of Pshiapshoqo invaded Talostaney, but they were ultimately stopped by the eldest son of Sholokh, Qarashey Sholokh.

In 1619, Alejuqo Shojenuqo was chosen as the prince of Qaziy Kabardia
