= Misost I of Kabardia =

Grand Prince of Kabardia between 1672 and 1695

Misost Qaziy

Grand Prince of Kabardia
- Reign: 1672–1695
- Predecessor: Hatokhshoqo Qaziy
- Successor: Kurghoqo of Kabardia
- Born: c. 17th century Kabardia
- Died: 1695; Kabardia
- Issue: Sons: Aliy; Yislambech; Hatokhshoqo; Qaziy; Batcheriy
Names
- Misost, son of Qaziy
- Kabardian: Къазый и къуэ Мысост
- House: Inalid dynasty; House of Misost
- Father: Qaziy Pshiapshoqo

Misost Qaziy (Note: Kabardian: Къазый Мысост Russian: Мисост Казиев) was a Kabardian prince and the founder of the Misost dynasty, who served as the Grand Prince of Kabardia from 1672 until his death. He emerged as one of the leading rulers of Greater Kabardia in the mid-17th century and played a central role in the political and military affairs of the region during a period marked by internal strife and shifting relations with the Crimean Khanate and the Tsardom of Russia.

== Biography ==
=== Early life ===
Misost, the fourth son of Qaziy, was one of the influential rulers of Greater Kabardia after the death of Jambot. Sources mention his name as early as 1640, in connection with his visit to the Terek in February. From the interrogatory speeches of Prince Musal, it is known that Misost took part in a quarrel with Chalimat and Yeldar, but they later reconciled, pledging not to take revenge. From a document signed by the Kudenets, it is clear that Misost declared his allegiance to Russia and swore to protect "our mother and sisters" (the Kudenets), the taverns, and the uzdens "from everything" that he had captured. On June 29, 1640, the Grand Prince of Kabardia, Alejuqo Shojenuqo, together with the princes Hatokhshoqo, Jambot, Islam Qaziy, and others, petitioned Tsar Michael of Russia to exchange their hostages, pay their salaries, and resolve their disputes and grievances.

There is little information about Prince Misost himself. It is known that he consistently supported Alejuqo in his power struggle.

=== Reign ===
In 1672, after the death of Hatokhshoqo Qaziy, his younger brother Misost was elected Grand Prince. The oath to Tsar Alexei Mikhailovich, as was customary after the change of Grand Prince, was confirmed by Misost. Thus, unlike the 1645 and 1662 treaties, which were signed by a single signature—that of Prince Aleguko and Prince Khatokshuko, respectively—in 1672 eight princes signed a similar treaty. This situation fully demonstrated the negative trends emerging in the political development of Kabardia. One of these was the transformation of the traditional system of governance and the devaluation of the Grand Prince's authority. The surrender of Kabardian hostages and their departure to Bakhchisaray signaled a shift in the sentiments of the Qeytuqo princes. While in the early 1660s they had unanimously supported an alliance with the tsar, ten years later more than four of all the Kabardian princes (out of 67 in 1662), as evidenced by the 50 hostages, opposed it. In this context, the signing of the sherti in 1672 became a formal obligation rather than a reflection of unity. This situation is clearly described in a document of the College of Foreign Affairs (1732), which notes that under Grand Prince Misost, the Kabardian princes gave hostages to the city of Terek in rotation and frequently sent ambassadors to Moscow to the Russian sovereigns for salaries; at the same time, fearing the Kuban Nogais, they sent ten people annually to Crimea instead of tribute. Here, the difficult position of Kabardia, situated between two competing powers, is clearly outlined. Thus, treaties with the tsar, requiring hostages to Terek, and the delivery of "gifts"—slaves, argamaks, and weapons—to Crimea were both essential elements of the policy pursued by the Kabardian princes to preserve their independence. The Russian tsar could not influence the Crimean Khan's relations with Kabardia, as he himself continued to pay commemorations to the khan, while the khan could not halt Russian expansion, for which Astrakhan served as a key outpost in the Caucasus. As N. F. Grabovsky noted, although Kabardian hostages were present in Terek and the Kabardians claimed Russian protection, they effectively remained within the sphere of influence of the Crimean khans. Under such conditions, the main tool of the Terek voivodes for expanding influence in Kabardia remained the long-standing method of provoking internecine conflicts. In the new conditions, when the Qeytuqo clan ceased to act as a unified political force, as evidenced by the eight signatures on the 1672 oath, this became easier. Soon, the dispersal of supreme authority among various princely lines intensified.

Until this time, the dependence of Kabardian princes on the tsar was expressed through treaties and the provision of hostages as guarantees. The transformation of Tengizbey and Adildjery from Kabardian princes into Russian service princes changed their status from sovereign rulers to semi-vassals. Recognition of the tsar's authority required renouncing the authority of the Grand Prince of Kabardia. As a result, a significant part of Kabardia, including its central and most developed regions, risked passing under the tsar's protectorate. This provoked strong opposition from Misost and Bechmirza, especially since Tengizbey, a descendant of the senior line of the Inalids, renounced his traditional rights. His change of status implied that his fief would fall under Russian jurisdiction. Such separatism within the core of Kabardia was unacceptable to the traditional elite. Tengizbey's position was shaped by his upbringing in the Terek fortress as a hostage (1640–1644, 1647–1652). Consequently, hopes of maintaining independence through alliance with Russia collapsed, and Greater Kabardia faced the threat of fragmentation. In response, Misost sought to return Kabardia to the sphere of influence of the Crimean Khanate. The princes of the Misostey and Jambotey appanages, led by Misost and his nephews Bechmirza and Qeytuqo, attempted to relocate the political center of Greater Kabardia to Pyatigorsky in order to preserve unity. This reflected the deepening internal crisis and the long-standing policy of maneuvering between the Ottoman Empire and Russia, whose rivalry in Circassia had lasted for over a century. Bechmirza's participation in the 1672 campaign against Poland on the side of the Ottoman-Crimean coalition further demonstrated the existence of a military alliance with the khan, likely reinforced by his marriage to a daughter of Khan Selim I Giray.

Misost's plans to move westward to Pyatigorsky provoked a strong reaction from his opponents, including the Terek voivodes, Kasbulat the Brave, and the service prince Tengizbey. Since hostages had not been obtained from Misost after 1672, likely due to the Crimean threat, the voivodes attempted to secure them by force. Following the departure of the forces of Khan Selim I Giray, Ayuka Khan was sent with his forces into Misost's lands, forcing the Qeytuqos to send hostages to Terek.

Despite this, in late summer and early autumn of 1673, Tengizbey, together with Kalmyk taishas, ravaged Misost's domains. These actions escalated the conflict into open internecine war, as Misost was compelled to retaliate in accordance with aristocratic norms and personal honor.

The return of Bechmirza from Crimea in autumn 1673 coincided with the deepening crisis. Misost attempted to form a coalition against Tengizbey and the Terek authorities. Documents of the Prikaz indicate that Misost sought military assistance from the Crimean Khan and even traveled to Crimea to secure troops. However, the khan, engaged in war in Ukraine, could offer only relocation to former nomadic lands along the Kuma and Balk rivers. Attempts to secure support from the princes of Jilakhstan and the Shamkhalate of Tarki failed. In June 1674, Kasbulat, acting under tsarist orders, launched a campaign toward Azov, but during the expedition learned that his estates had been attacked by Crimean forces. Reports later indicated that Misost and his relatives had seized the possessions of Adildjery. Misost was eventually compelled to submit, surrendering his son Hatokhshoqo as a hostage to Kasbulat and agreeing to send another son, Aliy, to Moscow. However, Hatokhshoqo escaped en route and fled to Azov, from where he was returned by the Crimean Khan, and Aliy's journey to Moscow never occurred. Misost's failed attempt to relocate to Pyatigorsky and his return to Baksan further intensified the conflict.

=== Struggle for power ===
In this struggle, V.N. Sokurov distinguishes two stages: between 1671 and 1687 and between 1693 and 1711. Lieutenant General Pavel Potemkin wrote that the Alejuqo clan was in Kabardia "in special respect", "but at the end of the last century (17th century), due to the hatred of other princes towards him, unable to tolerate his pride, a conspiracy was hatched and this tribe was exterminated even to the infant". The genealogical lists also indicate that the Alejuqo family "was beaten for pride". In fact, the reason for the extermination of the Alejuqo family, presented in the legends and genealogies of the Kabardian princes, does not explain the true motives for such sudden hatred towards a particularly revered family. Here we can also recall the story of the arrogance of the Tokhtamysh princes, which, most likely, also covered up some internecine strife that arose for more trivial reasons. The Tokhtamyshs were exiled, and subsequently, by mutual agreement of all interested parties, they agreed to a reduction in their status from princely to Tlekotlesh (Tlekotlesh are first-class warrior knights, nobles, gentry). Shora Nogmov reported that as a result of the conspiracy, some of the Shojenuqos were exterminated secretly, and others openly, so that the Shojenuqo's generation ceased to exist and now does not exist. This entire story was not a one-time event, but continued over several decades, meaning the causes of the internecine clashes could have varied greatly depending on the circumstances of the given time. Furthermore, it is crucial that the destruction of the Alejuqos began with the murder of Prince Adildjery. Prince Kasbulat noted that the Misosts and Jambolets "killed the Kabardian Adil-Girey-murza because he, Adil-Girey, and Dengizbey Murza with their brothers, children, and nephews became eternal serfs to you, the great sovereign, and did not adhere to the Crimean Khan." This phrase contains the meaning of the events of the 1670–1680s. The true cause of the bloody conflict, formalized as civil strife, was not simply the sherta to the tsar, since all the princes of Qaziy's Kabardia brought it, but the separatism of the princes Tengizbey and Adildjery, who owned half of Kabardia. The change of status of the sovereign Kabardian princes to the status of Russian service princes Tengizbey and Adildjery entailed a number of consequences, the main one of which was, in addition to the territorial split and the removal of half of the population of Greater Kabardia from the jurisdiction of the Grand Prince, the actual destruction of its political and social system. The essence of the first stage of the internecine war of 1671–1687 was the struggle over the location of the political center of Kabardia, either in Baksan or Pyatigorsky. Misost and the princes Bechmirza and Qeytuqo sought to withdraw to Pyatigorsky, away from the city of Terek, which had numerous Kalmyk troops and artillery at its disposal. The Terek voivodes, for their part, took measures to prevent such a development. Some light on the events in Kabardia in the 1670s–1690s is shed by the "Minutes of the Interrogation of the Kabardian Ambassador Magomet Atazhukin at the Collegium of Foreign Affairs..." (March 7, 1732) and the "Explanation of the Kabardian Peoples..." (April 26, 1732). The second document asserts that the Kabardian princes, soon after the murder of Adildjery, moved together to Pyatigorsky.

"...The Kabardians lived along the Kuma River and served the Russian sovereign, and they gave hostages to the city of Terek with rotation, and whoever they don't remember, and at that time their eldest prince was Masaus Kaziyev's son, and after him, Prince Tenzbey, Bekmurza, Kaziy Masausov and others..."

The Ambassadorial Prikaz sent a letter to Prince Kasbulat about the need for his arrival in Terek City to bring the "mountain owners" to sherti for Tsar Peter the Great (January 8, 1676). Despite the lack of reports, the presence of a "memory from the Ambassadorial Prikaz in the Kazan Palace Prikaz about sending a man to Terek City to bring the Kabardian murzas to sherti" and hostages in Terek City allows us to conclude that no formal changes occurred in Russian-Kabardian relations at this time. In essence, the situation developed in such a way that the act of sherti was purely nominal; the presence of hostages in Terek was a tribute to diplomatic tradition and was intended to deter attacks on Terek City, as well as to obtain permission to travel to Terek for fishing and grazing cattle in the area of the Terek.

The nominal nature of the act of shertovaniye in 1676 is also confirmed by information about the position of Prince M.K. Cherkassky. Involvement in the internecine war in Qaziy's Kabardia forced him to move from the left to the right bank of the Terek, "in the vicinity of the voivode's city" (1674). Later, he asked the tsar (April 9, 1676) to build a "town" near his Terek court due to the fact that "his enemies have now multiplied, which testifies to the radius of influence of the Terek fortress in those years. Against the backdrop of the narrowing of Russian-Kabardian relations to the level of a formal diplomatic procedure in the context of the Russo-Turkish War, the accession of the new Crimean Khan, Murad Giray, in 1678 was marked once again by the inclusion of all Circassian lands in the Khan's title. He began to be referred to, among other things, as "the sovereign of the Kabardian and mountain Circassians of the right and left sides". This step testified to the Crimean throne's renewed hope of expanding its influence across all of Circassia. This information also indicates that, through incredible efforts and bloodshed, the princes of Greater Kabardia managed to virtually eliminate the conflict between Istanbul and Moscow.

Despite Misost's significant success in consolidating all the rulers of Greater Kabardia around himself and moving the political center to Pyatigorsky, thereby avoiding its territorial and socio-political disintegration, the confrontation between Tengizbey and the other princes continued. Bechmirza sought to take his success to its logical conclusion by moving the principality's political center beyond the Kuban. Tengizbey and his sons continued to resist this. Ultimately, Prince Bechmirza left for Crimea with his eldest son, Sholokh. Then, "having begged the Crimean Khan for the army, which had the commander, Savat Giray Sultan, he arrived, took all the Circassian princes and their subjects captive, and transferred them to the Urup River and settled them there. "Minutes of the interrogation of the Kabardian ambassador Magomet Atazhukin at the Collegium of Foreign Affairs..." and "Explanation of the Kabardian peoples...", complete the picture of the transfer of the center of Greater Kabardia to Trans-Kuban. From them it is clear that when the Crimean detachment led by Prince Bechmirza and, according to one version, led by Shahbaz Giray, according to another by Savat Giray Sultan approached Pyatigorsky, many rulers fled, some to Ayuka Khan, some to the Kumyks. Then Shahbaz Giray took the people and took them all to the Kuban, and then he called them, the Pyatigorsky rulers, to him in the Kuban.

With the death of Prince Kasbulat in 1681 and the appointment of his son Adil-Girey Kasbulatovich in his place, the influence of the Terek governors on Kabardian and Caucasian affairs was once again reduced to nothing. The influence of the Kabardian princes on the balance of power in the region is confirmed by the facts of the Ottoman-Crimean-Russian conflict in Crimea in 1684–1685. At that time, in the wars of the Ottoman-Crimean coalition with the Holy League (the Union of Austria, Poland, Venice, and Malta (1683)), the Circassians sided with the first. In 1686, Russia, having concluded an agreement with Poland, joined the League. Fulfilling its obligations to the anti-Ottoman coalition, Russia undertook two campaigns in Crimea (1687, 1689) to prevent the Crimean Khan's troops from participating in military operations on the European fronts. Despite his enormous army (100,000), Prince V.V. Golitsyn retreated without engaging the Crimean army, which in 1689 included a 50,000-strong contingent of Kumyks, Circassians, and Nogais under the command of the Azov commandant, Shahbaz Giray. At the same time, Golitsyn's troops numbered only 222 highlanders, 100 of whom were servicemen from the Terek fortress. These facts clearly demonstrate the consequences for the balance of military and political power in the region that arose as a result of the rupture in relations between the tsar and the princes of Greater Kabardia. Thus, the Kabardian princes' attempts to finally free themselves from the Moscow-Istanbul foreign policy conflict that tore their country apart in the 1660s were unsuccessful. The Tsar interpreted the Inalids' alliance with the Tsar as a prerequisite for attempting to establish a protectorate over Kabardia.

It was precisely in this context that, a decade after returning to Baksan, Grand Prince Misost I was forced to relocate the political center of Greater Kabardia to Pyatigorsky, and then to Trans-Kuban. It was precisely the desire to preserve the country's independence that lay at the root of the internecine war of the early 1670s in Greater Kabardia. The breakdown of Kabardino-Russian relations in the early 1670s had a detrimental effect not only on the nature of bilateral ties but also on Russia's relations with the entire Caucasus region.

=== Later life and death ===
In April 1688, Old Believer Cossacks, numbering a thousand, began resettling on the Kuma River. The Kabardian prince Misost allocated them a place on the Karamyk River in the Mozhary tract (modern-day Budyonnovsk). Later that year, a campaign by Crimean serasker Kazy-Girey against Kabardia resulted in destruction, prisoner-taking, and livestock theft. The Crimeans were eventually expelled by the Kabardians. Misost ruled Kabardia until his death in 1695 and was succeeded by Kurghoqo.

== Sources ==
- Kardanov, Ch. E. (2016). Князья Кабарды [Princes of Kabarda] (in Russian). Nalchik: Izdatel'stvo M. i V. Kotlyarovykh. ISBN 978-5-93680-971-2.
- Blazhniev, B. Kh. (2015). Вестник Кабардино-Балкарского института гуманитарных исследований [Bulletin of the Kabardino-Balkarian Institute for Humanitarian Research] (PDF). Vestnik KBIGI (in Russian). 1 (24). Nalčik: Kabardino-Balkarskiy institut gumanitarnykh issledovaniy. ISSN 2306-5826.
