= Qudenet of Kabardia =

Qudenet Qambolet

Grand Prince of Kabardia
- Reign: 1616 – 1624
- Predecessor: Sholokh Tepsaruqo
- Successor: Alejuqo Shojenuqo
- Born: Unknown; Kabardia
- Died: 1624; Kabardia
- Issue: Wuriskhan / "Yakov"; Chamilat; Yildar
Names
- Qudenet, son of Qambolet
- Kabardian: Къамболэт и къуэ Къудэнет
- House: Inalid dynasty; Yidarey dynasty
- Father: Qambolet Yidar
- Religion: Sunni Islam

Qudenet Qambolet (Note: Kabardian: Къамболэт Къудэнет Russian: Куденет Камбулат) or Kudenet Kambulatovich Cherkassky (Note: Russian: Куденет Камбулатович Черкасский) was a prominent Kabardian prince who served as the Grand Prince of Kabardia from 1616 to 1624, until his death. A member of the Idarey dynasty, Qudenet's reign was characterized by a close, albeit complex, strategic alliance with the Tsardom of Russia.

== Early life and reign ==
Qudenet is first mentioned in documents of 1588 when his father, Qambolet Idar, sent him and Mamstruk to Russia. The new embassy arrived Moscow on January 4 and pledged allegiance to the Tsar. On January 20, Fyodor Ivanovich received the Kabardians in the Golden Chamber. The tsar "graced" Mamstruk, Qudenet, and the other princes, as well as all members of the embassy, ordered them given a place "at the table" and presented with gifts of fur coats and money. Mamstruk received a sable coat and 50 rubles, Qudenet a fur coat and 30 rubles, Yelbezduqo —and his 12 companions— four rubles each "and some good cloth" and the remaining twenty-two who arrived received a salary of three rubles each "and some medium-priced cloth". The purpose for the gifts given by the Tsar was to improve relations with the Kabardians politicians and raise influence over the region.

In July 1588, the princes Mamstruk and Qudenet renewed their allegiance to the Tsardom of Russia under a set of defined conditions. Chief among these was a commitment not to align with the Ottoman Empire, the Crimean Khanate, the Shamkhalate, or any other adversaries of the Russian sovereign. They were also obliged to cooperate with the voivodes of Terek and Astrakhan in efforts to bring other regional feudal lords under Moscow's authority.

As part of this arrangement, several prominent princes, including Kambolet Idar, Mamstruk Temryukovich, Domanuk Temryukovich, Yelbezduqo, Anzoruqo, Sanjaley Qanqilish, and Bitemruq, along with their close relatives and retainers, were required to reside in the Terek fortification. From there, they were to serve both the land of Circassians and the Russian state, and to take part in military actions against opposing factions. Among those identified as adversaries were Sholokh Tepsaruqo and his brothers, as well as the Qeytuqey princes, Tanyanuk, Aslanbech I Qeytuqo, Jansokh Qeytuqo, and other allied figures.

The "shertnaya record" was a detailed oath agreement outlining the obligations of the Kabardian princes toward the Russian state. Its central provisions emphasized their pledge of loyal service to the Tsardom of Russia, including a commitment to supply military forces for Russian campaigns against the Ottoman Empire and the Crimean Khanate. The agreement further stipulated that, if required by the sovereign, Kabardian forces would participate in broader military operations, including campaigns in the Livonian War, stating that "if the sovereign of all Russia orders us to go against the enemy, the Lithuanians or the Germans," they were bound to comply. The embassy with the participation of Qudenet represented only the Idarey possessions. The Russian government did not want the Kabardians to throne a prince as the Grand Prince of Kabardia without Tsar's approval, as these princes most of the time ended up being against the Tsardom.

Following the death of Kambolet in 1589, a renewed power struggle emerged among the Kabardian nobility. This development appears to have influenced the Qeytuqo faction to align more closely with the Russian state.

At a meeting of the Khasa (the council), attended by Princes, Tlekotlesh, Worqs, and representatives of the common people, Jansokh Qeytuqo, the younger brother of Aslanbech, was elected grand prince. The assembly subsequently swore allegiance to the Tsardom of Russia, a decision communicated to Voivode A. I. Khvorostin on 14 October 1589. In response, Russian authorities reestablished an ostrog (fortress) on the Sunzha River.

Jansokh Qeytuqo, along with other princes such as Qudenet and Mamstruk, while leading a campaign against Sholokh alongside a Cossack detachment under Grigory Poltev, was unable to bring the entirety of Kabarda under Russian authority. These military efforts intensified internal conflicts toward the end of the 16th century. Jansokh eventually lost his position as senior prince, while the influence of Sholokh Tepsaruqo increased.

Tsar Feodor Ivanovich granted Mamstruk authority over Kabardia. Soon afterward, Qazy Pshiapsoqo invited Mamstruk and Domanuk Temryukovich to his residence and ordered their killing, an act generally dated to around 1601. This incident became one of the key events that reignited feudal strife in Kabarda, once again disrupting the region's stability. In its aftermath, fear of the destruction of the Idarey lineage spread among its members. Many relocated in the early 17th century to Lesser Kabardia, where they joined other dynasties, while others moved to the Russian stronghold at Terek.

Soon thereafter, Qudenet Qambolet, along with other princes such as Sanjaley Qanqilish, established a settlement in the town of Terki. Within this community, Qudenet was appointed prince, exercising authority over Kabardian servicemen and newly baptized inhabitants. The exact dates of their settlement in Terki are not recorded in the available sources.

After Sholokh's death in 1616, Qudenet Qambolet was granted the title of prince by Moscow, However he was disliked by other Kabardian dynasties.

In early 1624, the Grand Prince of Kabardia, "Kudenet Kambolet Cherkassky", sent his son Wuriskhan to Moscow. After converting to Orthodoxy, he received the name Yakov and entered court service as a stolnik. He was granted precedence among other stolniks and assigned a place in the Small Golden Chamber. During the wedding of Tsar Mikhail Feodorovich and Evdokia Lukyanovna Streshneva, Yakov was seated next to the groom.

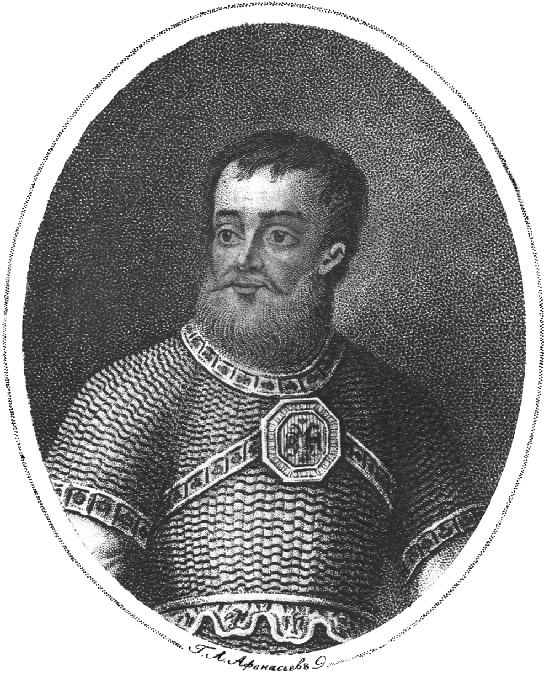
Portrait of Prince Yakov Kudenetovich Cherkassky

His rapid rise at court was attributed to his abilities and experience. Yakov Cherkassky was regarded as an intelligent and capable figure, well acquainted with the social and diplomatic life of the Terek town, where he likely took part in receptions for Turkish, Georgian, and Western European envoys and travelers visiting Kabardia.

Qudenet remained the Grand Prince of Kabardia until his death and died in 1624, all of his children served the Tsar in the Russian princely family of Cherkassky.

== Sources ==
- Kardanov, Ch. E. (2016). Князья Кабарды [Princes of Kabarda] (in Russian). Nalchik: Izdatel'stvo M. i V. Kotlyarovykh. ISBN 978-5-93680-971-2.
