= Hatokhshoqo I of Kabardia =

Grand Prince of Kabardia between 1654 and 1672

Hatokhshoqo Qaziy

Grand Prince of Kabardia
- Reign: 1654 – 1672
- Predecessor: Alejuqo Shojenuqo
- Successor: Misost Qaziy
- Born: Unknown; Kabardia
- Died: 1672; Kabardia
- Issue: Qurghoqo Hatokhshoqo
Names
- Hatokhshoqo, son of Qaziy
- Kabardian: Къазый и къуэ ХьэтIохъущокъуэ
- House: Inalid dynasty; Hatokhshoqo dynasty (Founder)
- Father: Qaziy Pshiapshoqo
- Religion: Sunni Islam

Hatokhshoqo Qaziy (Note: Kabardian: Къазый ХьэтIохъущокъуэ Russian: Хатохшоко Казыев) was a Grand Prince of Kabardia and founder of the Hatokhshoqo dynasty who ruled in the mid-17th century. He emerged as one of the leading princes of Kabardia following the murder of his father, Qaziy Pshiapshoqo, in 1615 and later succeeded his cousin and ally Alejuqo Shojenuqo as the senior prince.

During his reign, Hatokhshoqo played a central role in consolidating political authority in Kabardia, attempting to reduce internal conflicts among the Kabardian nobility while maintaining the traditional social order. His rule coincided with a period of complex diplomacy between the Tsardom of Russia and the Crimean Khanate, in which Kabardia sought to balance external pressures from both powers.

Hatokhshoqo is remembered in both historical accounts and Circassian folklore for his efforts to stabilize Kabardia and enforce princely authority, as well as for episodes of internal struggle and vengeance that became part of oral tradition. He remained the leading prince of Kabardia until his death in 1672.

== Early life ==
After the murder of his father Qazi Pshiapsoqo in 1615, Hatokhshoqo became one of the leading ruling princes of Kabardia.

Hatokhshoqo was a cousin and a main companion of Alejuqo Shojenuqo. In the early 1620s, when Kabardia's foreign policy began to shift toward the Crimean Khanate, Khan Mehmed III Giray married the sister of Hatokhshoqo.

In the 1630s, Qazy's Kabardia (future Greater Kabardia) was divided between three brothers: Hatokhshoqo, Jambot, and Misost. According to Shora Nogmov, prosperity and peace were widespread throughout the domains of Prince Khatozhuko and his brothers. According to some accounts, Hatokhshoqo's domain consisted of 50 auls (villages), each containing up to 1,000 households, and in general and important matters all were under the control of a single senior prince.

Despite the pro-Crimean relations, Alejuqo never gave up hope of improving relations with Russia. While well aware of Russia's military capabilities, he nevertheless tried to avoid war. The Supreme Prince of Kabardia made his final attempt to avoid a clash in 1640, when a Kabardian embassy, led by the particularly trusted uzden Bezruko Akhmet, was sent to Moscow to Tsar Mikhail Fedorovich. The talented Kabardian diplomat carried a letter from Alejuqo and Hatokhshoqo to Moscow, containing assurances of loyalty to Russia and a request for an independent envoy from Moscow to fairly resolve disputes in Kabardia.

In 1641, a detachment from the city of Terek, under the command of the Strelets voivode Artemy Shishmarev, was sent to the lands of Chalimat Cherkassky, which had been conquered by Alejuqo. The detachment consisted of 100 mounted Streltsy, 18 boyars, and approximately 200 Chechens and Ingush. The formation of an anti-Kabardian coalition began. The first to join the Russian detachment were forces of the Lesser Kabardian princes Yeldar Aybak, Narchu Yelbezduqo, Aytech Akhle, Qazi Alkhas, and Qudenet Baraghun. A large cavalry force from the Great Nogai Horde soon arrived. The Nogai were led by the murzas Soltanash Aksakov and Khoroshai Chubarmametov. Dagestani rulers, interested in weakening Kabardia, also hastened to the area. The Kumyk cavalry was led by Shamkhal Aydemir himself. Finally, many servicemen rushed from the city of Terek, seeking profit, to join the anti-Kabardian coalition. They were led by Tatarhan and Tonzhekhan Araslanov. However, Alejuqo and Hatokhshoqo were also quick to act. Warned in advance by Mutsal Cherkassky's men remaining in Terek about the impending campaign, they formed their own coalition. Detachments from the Maly Nogai, led by the murzas Urakov and Kaspulatov, and the Abaza rulers Saralp Murza Loov and Kazy-Murza Dorukov, came to the Kabardians' aid. On July 12, 1641, the opposing sides met on the Malka River (Balk). The opposing army was routed and suffered enormous losses. In a desperate attempt to escape the encirclement, horsemen and foot soldiers leaped from a cliff into the river, but almost all were killed or drowned. All the leaders of the opposing forces were killed in the battle, including Chalimat Cherkassky, Shamkhal Aydemir, Yeldar Aybak, and Artemy Shishmarev.

The news of the defeat of the pro-Russian forces shocked the governors of Astrakhan and the city of Terek. For a long time, they hesitated to report the defeat to the tsar. After some time, word reached Kabardia that a large army was gathering in Astrakhan to support the Terek governors. The Russians demanded an immediate confession, the release of prisoners, and recognition of the Russian tsar's authority. Failure to comply threatened the execution of the Kabardian hostages in Terek and the burning of Kabardia itself. Shojenuqo refused to admit his guilt or release the prisoners without ransom. Well aware of the imbalance of power between Russia and Kabardia, and seeking to avoid a devastating invasion, Alejuqo and Hatokhshoqo made the decision to resettle their people beyond the Kuban River, where they enjoyed relative safety and could quickly receive aid from Western Circassia and the Lesser Nogai. Moreover, these lands fell within the Crimean Khanate's sphere of influence, and any presence of Russian troops there would have raised concerns in Bakhchisarai and Istanbul. At the end of 1641, Qazy's Kabardia overran the Kuban region.

Having forced the Kabardians to resettle, the Russian government quickly realized its mistake. The vast lands abandoned by the Kabardians began to attract the attention of the Kalmyks, who had recently arrived in the Volga region and the North Caucasus. If these lands were seized by the Kalmyks, who at that time were experiencing difficult relations with Russia, the city of Terek would be isolated from Russia, posing a serious threat to Russian influence in the Caucasus. Less than a year later, Russia began seeking ways to normalize relations with Alejuqo. However, initial attempts to persuade the Kabardians to return were unsuccessful. The Moscow government then recalled Alejuqo's son-in-law, Mutsal Cherkassky, who had been exiled to Siberia. He was urgently brought to Moscow, all charges were dropped, and all positions and powers in Terek were restored to him. At a reception in the Kremlin on August 20, 1642, the tsar personally instructed him to return Kabardia from the Kuban region to Beshtaugorye.

Mutsal Cherkassky returned to Terek only in March 1643. After consulting with the Terek voivodes, he sent his uzden Biksha Aliy and the boyar's son Andrei Senin to negotiate with Alejuqo. For Alejuqo Shojenuqo, the time had come to choose between the Crimean Khanate and the Russian state. Both powers offered protection, but rarely fulfilled their promises. Crimea wielded greater influence in the region, often demanding tribute and sending Adyghe captives to the slave markets of Bakhchisarai. Even during alliances, Crimean detachments frequently raided Kabardian lands for plunder and slaves.

By this time, Alejuqo and Hatokhshoqo's relatives had lost power in Bakhchisarai, ending the period of relative alliance with Crimea. Envoys from Mutsal Cherkassky arrived at a favorable moment with proposals to improve relations with Russia. The longstanding hostility of the Adyghe toward the Tatars influenced the decision, and Alejuqo gave preliminary consent to an alliance with Russia. Since Crimean troops were stationed nearby, negotiations were conducted in strict secrecy. Alejuqo personally handled correspondence, entrusting messages only to his close associate Bezruko Akhmet. Upon arriving in Terek on April 4, 1643, the envoys explained that Alejuqo could not publicly swear allegiance due to the risk of a Crimean attack. They proposed continuing negotiations along the Kura River.

On May 16, Mutsal Cherkassky and the Terek voivode Efim Samarin met with Alejuqo, who was accompanied by two tlekotleshi, five Nogai murzas, and 52 uorki. The negotiations were successful, and the parties agreed to continue them in Terek. The Kabardian delegation arrived on May 20, and negotiations took place the following day. The Russian side, represented by the Terek voivodes Mikhail Volynsky, Efim Samarin, Vasily Atarsky, and Mutsal Cherkassky, announced that Alejuqo was forgiven for previous actions. Alejuqo confirmed loyalty to Tsar Mikhail Feodorovich, while both sides discussed military cooperation, hostages, and guarantees of safe passage for Russian envoys and merchants. The Kabardians agreed to return to their lands after the harvest.

== Reign ==
After Alejuqo died in 1654, Hatokhshoqo Qazi succeeded him as the Grand Prince of Kabardia.

According to research by E. N. Kusheva, during the time of Hatokhshoqo Qazy, the Kabardians occupied the plains and foothills along the Terek River, its left tributaries, and the Sunzha River, that is, the territory known in historical lexicon as Greater Kabardia and Lesser Kabardia. According to account of Shora Nogmov Hatokhshoqo restored and forever confirmed among the people the prudent decrees and rituals of his great-great-grandfather, Beslan the Fat regarding princes, uzdens, and serfs.

At the same time, Nogmov writes with complete clarity about Hatokhshoqo's desire to end inter-princely strife in Kabardia:

“Prince Khatozhuko Kazyevich... tried with all his might to find means to eliminate the incessant disputes, strife and unrest...”

The brothers Batirsha and Batirbi were killed, then the two brothers Janborimas and Janborishan, Shuzhey's young nephews were all assassinated by Hatokhshoqo during this period

Here's a song about Kuale Sozarikho:

I am the son of the old Kuala,

Kuala's son. My name is Sozarikho.

I carried heavy carts to the mountains

I was filming the pre-dawn star above the roof; alone.

A beautiful star is mine

I'll knock the hero's head off with my finger. Hatokhshoqo is gone! Woe!

Shuzhey sends me to compete.

All of Kabardia has already gathered and come to watch.

The herald has already named me.

Let Tkha beat Shuzhey's friends.

Let Tkha beat Hussein, Wide Foot.

Oh, they did wrong: they showed Shogen, But he is not on the circle, Wide Foot.

Even if our fathers were not brothers, His mother was my mother's sister!

Oh, on the circle, oh-oh, I'm going out... A terrible day.

We pull each other, push each other.

I pressed him into a log with my elbow, I broke two of Hussein's ribs.

Oh, a bright, joyful rumor rushed across the world, Oh, a sad one, alas, flew after it right away.

Alas, Khachyase flashed above my head, A sharp knife plunged into my throat.

Who is fair, tell me.

For my life and death, I beg, let Hatakshuka avenge my blood.

There are versions of this song, but its main meaning is as follows. One day, in Hatokhshoqo's absence, Shuzhey forced Sozarikho to wrestle one of his peluans (heroic wrestlers). Among them was Sozarikho's maternal cousin, and it was agreed that he would not participate in the wrestling ring—the blood of a relative could not be spilled. Shuzhey failed to fulfill the agreement and sent Sozarikho's cousin against him, who began to accuse his opponent of cowardice. Sozarikho, unable to tolerate the insults, dealt with the unfortunate man. Shuzhey sent a second wrestler. During the duel, the second wrestler quietly drew a knife and plunged it into his opponent's throat. Hatokhshoqo, learning of this, vowed to avenge the blood of his favorite. He deceitfully appeared before Shuzhey, ostensibly seeking an ally, and even swore to it, before "chopping him down with a sabre." The Kabardians have a saying about Hatokhshoqo's oath-breaking: "Khetokhushchokue nape," which means "Hatokhshoqo's conscience."

In the spring of 1653, Khatakshuk's sister, the wife of the Crimean Khan, came to Kabardia “to the cry of her brother Islam-murza” accompanied by Aga Aley and 20 Crimean Tatars. The few Kabardian owners gave the Crimean prince good horses, sabres, and armored hats from themselves, but not as tribute. Hatokhshoqo Qazy remained the Grand Prince of Kabardia until his death in 1672.

== Sources ==
- Kardanov, Ch. E. (2016). Князья Кабарды [Princes of Kabarda] (in Russian). Nalchik: Izdatel'stvo M. i V. Kotlyarovykh. ISBN 978-5-93680-971-2.
