= Alejuqo of Kabardia =

Alejuqo Shojenuqo
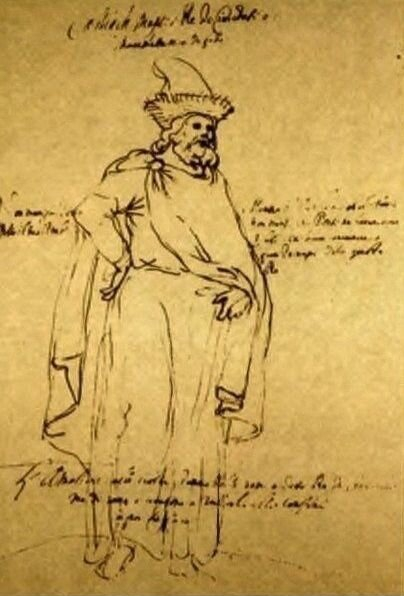
- Drawing by Teramo Castelli depicting Alejuqo Shojenuqo, based purely on imagination

Grand Prince of Kabardia
- Reign: 1624 – 1654
- Predecessor: Qudenet Qambolet
- Successor: Hatokhshoqo Qazy
- Born: 16th century Kabardia
- Died: 1654; Kabardia
- Issue: Alejuqo (Note: Алыджыкъуэ); Shereguqo (Note: Шэрэгукъуэ); Anfoqo (Note: Анфокъуэ); Hapikh (Note: Хьэпых); Sultanbiy (Note: Султӏанбий); Pshimakho (Note: Пщымахуэ)
Names
- Alejuqo, son of Shojenuqo
- Kabardian: Шэуджэныкъуэ и къуэ Алыджыкъуэ
- House: Inalid dynasty; House of Shojenuqo
- Father: Shojenuqo Pshiapshoqo
- Religion: Sunni Islam

Alejuqo Shojenuqo (Note: Kabardian: Щоджэныкъуэ Алыджыкъуэ Russian: Алегуко Шогенуков ("Aleguko Shogenukov")) was a Kabardian prince who served as the Grand Prince of Kabardia from 1624 to 1654. He was a member of the Shojenuqo princely house, the son of Shojenuqo Pshiapshoqo, and the grandson of Qaziy Pshiapshoqo. Alejuqo rose to power in a period that involved occasional internal clashes among the Kabardian noble families.

Alejuqo supported the unification of both regions of Kabardia (Lesser & Greater Kabardia) under one Grand Prince. During his reign, he played a significant role in the political and military affairs of Kabardia, navigating shifting alliances and conflicts involving both local princes and foreign states. His rule was marked by efforts to consolidate authority within Kabardia while maintaining diplomatic relations with major regional powers, including Muscovy and the Crimean Khanate. Alejuqo remained an influential figure in Kabardian politics until his death in 1654, after which the balance of power among the Kabardian nobility continued to evolve.

== Early life ==
According to Circassian folklore, Alejuqo was a tall and freckled man, clad in a red silk corset, with a "wasp-like waist". He was raised according to the modest customs of princely rites. He was taught horseback riding and swordsmanship, and trained as a knight. When it was determined that he had received sufficient training, he was invited to the great khasa ("Council") of Greater Kabardia, where he was elected as the senior prince of the appanage in 1619.

At the time, Kabardia was under constant threat from the Ottoman Turks and the Crimea from the west, the Nogais from the north, and Safavids from the south, who had recently occupied Eastern Georgia during the Georgian campaign of Shah Abbas the Great.

At the beginning of 1619, Kabardia faced the threat of a second invasion by the Great Nogai Horde. Alejuqo understood that Kabardia alone could not resist the Nogai Tatars, whose cavalry significantly outnumbered the Kabardian forces. In response, he organized a coalition of North Caucasian groups to oppose the planned invasion. Detachments from Dagestan, Chechnya, and Western Circassia, including forces from Besleney, Chemguy, and Zhane, gathered in Kabardia under Alejuqo Shodjenuqo. The formation of this alliance strengthened Kabardia's defensive position. Confronted with the combined forces of several North Caucasian rulers, the Nogais abandoned their invasion plans. In the same year, the Great Nogai Horde, facing additional pressure from Kalmyk movements in the steppe, migrated from the right bank to the left bank of the Volga River. As a result, Nogai raids into Kabardia temporarily ceased.

In 1624, Qudenet Qambolet of Kabardia died. After Qudenet's death, the charter for the position of Grand Prince of Kabardia was issued to his younger brother, Pshemakho, but he failed to win the election over Alejuqo. The young prince was fortunate in his companions. First and foremost, these were Alejuqo's cousin, Princes Hatokhshoqo Qazy and Bezruko Akhmet.

== Reign ==
In the early 1620s, Kabardia's foreign policy began to shift toward Crimea. Khan Mehmed III Giray married the sister of Hatokhshoqo Qazi, and in 1622, his brother, Kalga Shahin Giray, married the sister of Alejuqo.

Alejuqo gradually extended his power to Lesser Kabardia. In 1626, the Tlekotlesh Anzors were subjugated. In 1628, Cherkassky was forced to move to the Terek city of Pshimakho (Pshchymakhue), all his possessions coming under Alejuqo's control. Attacks by detachments from Qazi's Kabardia on Russian settlements on the Terek River became more frequent. Captured Russians were sold to Shahin Giray in Crimea. At the same time, Cossack servicemen began fleeing en masse to the Kabardians.

On January 20, 1638, ambassadors from Crimea arrived in Kabardia and Dagestan bearing rich gifts and an order from the khan to send Kabardian cavalry for a campaign against Azov, which had been captured by the Don Cossacks in 1637. Alejuqo greeted the ambassadors warmly and gratefully accepted the gifts, but refused to send a highland army under various pretexts.

Alejuqo understood well that sending his army on long campaigns was extremely unwise. Alejuqo also always refused the Terek voivodes' appeals to send his army for campaigns against Russia's enemies. Alejuqo's policy of neutrality bore fruit during Alejuqo's reign. Kabardia never launched major campaigns against its neighbors, which ultimately allowed the Kabardian cavalry to retain its considerable mobilization potential. S. A. Belokurov, characterizing the military strength of Alejuqo's army, spoke of over 1,000 uzdens, over 2,000 mounted armored soldiers, and over 2,000 peasants. A formidable force for the time, and that does not include the retinues of Hatokhshoqo and other princes allied with Alejuqo. In the late 1630s, Kabardia established good relations with Georgia. These relations were significantly strengthened by the marriage of the son of the Mingrelian Prince Levan II Dadiani, to the daughter of Alejuqo. Alejuqo's daughter's truly royal dowry inspires respect: 100 souls of the yasyr, 100 silver vessels, 100 gold dresses, 100 mares, 100 bulls, and 100 arquebuses.

After Prince Sholokh Cherkassky, Alejuqo's son-in-law, fell to his death while riding a wild horse in 1636, power in the Terek town passed to his brother, Mutsal Sunchaleevich. According to the custom of levirate marriage, he married his brother's widow, Porhan, Alejuqo's sister.

Mutsal began to assist Alejuqo in his efforts to unify Kabardia. According to some reports, Mutsal participated in the attack of Alejuqo's troops on the lands of Chalimat and Eldar Cherkassky on May 29, 1641. These territories were annexed to the possessions of Qazy's Kabardia. Many prisoners were captured, including the mother and two sisters of Chalimat Cherkassky. Events were moving toward open war. A pretext was needed to begin it, and it was soon found.

By 1641, Kabardia was already practically united by Alejuqo Shojenuqo. Only one major ruler of Lesser Kabardia remained, pursuing an independent policy. This was the elderly prince Mudar Alkhas, who had strong family ties with the Shah of Iran Abbas the Great and the Shamkhal of Tarki.

Alejuqo never gave up hope of improving relations with Russia. While well aware of Russia's military capabilities, he nevertheless tried to avoid war. The Supreme Prince of Kabardia made his final attempt to avoid a clash in 1640, when a Kabardian embassy, led by the particularly trusted uzden Bezruko Akhmet, was sent to Moscow to Tsar Mikhail Fedorovich. The talented Kabardian diplomat carried a letter from Alejuqo and Hatokhshoqo to Moscow, containing assurances of loyalty to Russia and a request for an independent envoy from Moscow to fairly resolve disputes in Kabardia. There were complaints about the bias of the Terek governors and the oppression of hostages in Terek. But the most important thing was the tone of the letter itself. Although the charter was full of assurances of allegiance to Russia, the document clearly implied that, if Moscow did not heed the Kabardians' requests, Alejuqo reserved the right to change his overlord. Essentially, it was a hidden ultimatum: either Moscow recognize Alejuqo as Supreme Prince of Kabardia, or Kabardia would come under the wing of Crimea.

On June 29, 1640, Bezruko Akhmet was received at the Ambassadorial Prikaz. The negotiations themselves took place on August 25, without the Tsar's presence. It immediately became clear that the Tsar supported Alejuqo's opponents. The charter was declared improperly and impolitely written. All of Alejuqo's requests were rejected, and he himself was accused of various untruths, the most important of which was maintaining good relations with Crimea (which was only partially true). The negotiations appeared to have ended in vain. It was declared that the Kabardian ambassador deserved the death penalty for such an improper charter. Bezruko awaited his fate until September 9, when he was unexpectedly received by Tsar Mikhail Fedorovich. Bezruko was informed that Prince Dmitry Gorchakov was being sent to Kabardia to resolve disputes, and a charter was presented to Alejuqo inviting him to confess. The next day, Bezruko departed for Kabardia.

In 1641, a detachment from the city of Terek, under the command of the Strelets voivode Artemy Shishmarev, was sent to the lands of Chalimat Cherkassky, which had been conquered by Alejuqo. The detachment consisted of 100 mounted Strelets, 18 boyars, and approximately 200 Chechens and Ingush. The formation of an anti-Kabardian coalition began. The first to join the Russian detachment were forces of the Lesser Kabardian princes Yeldar Aybak, Narchu Yelbezduqo, Aytech Akhle, Qazi Alkhas, and Qudenet Baraghun. A large cavalry force from the Great Nogai Horde soon arrived. The Nogai were led by the murzas Soltanash Aksakov and Khoroshai Chubarmametov. Dagestani rulers, interested in weakening Kabardia, also hastened to the area. The Kumyk cavalry was led by Shamkhal Aydemir himself. Finally, many servicemen rushed from the city of Terek, seeking easy profit, to join the anti-Kabardian coalition. They were led by Tatarhan and Tonzhekhan Araslanov. However, Alejuqo and Hatokhshoqo were also quick to act. Warned in advance by Mutsal Cherkassky's men remaining in Terek about the impending campaign against them, they formed their own coalition. Detachments from Maly Nogai, led by the murzas Urakov and Kaspulatov, and the Abaza rulers Saralp Murza Loov and Kazy-Murza Dorukov, came to the Kabardians' aid. On July 12, 1641, the opposing sides met on the Malka (Balk) River. The opposing army was routed and suffered enormous losses. In a desperate attempt to escape the encirclement, horsemen and foot soldiers leaped from a cliff into the Balk River, but almost all were killed or drowned. All the leaders of the opposing forces were killed in the battle, including Chalimat Cherkassky, Shamkhal Aydemir, Yeldar Aybak, and Artemy Shishmarev.

Several hundred people were captured by the Kabardians, among whom were the princes Tatarkhan Aslan and Akhle Aytech, as well as Qudenet Baraghun.

Without a doubt, had Alejuqo been defeated, Kabardia would have been devastated by foreign invaders, and the Dagestani rulers would have assumed hegemonic power in the North Caucasus. The devastated Kabardian lands would have become easy prey for constant raids, which would have set back the nation's development for many years. Alejuqo Shojenuqo's military leadership and his ability to rally the people to defend their homeland played a significant role in the Kabardian victory. The Battle of Malka in 1641 is one of the major milestones in Kabardian history.

The news of the defeat of the pro-Russian forces shocked the governors of Astrakhan and the city of Terek. For a long time, they hesitated to report the defeat to the tsar. After some time, word reached Kabardia that a large army was gathering in Astrakhan to support the Terek governors. The Russians demanded an immediate confession, the release of prisoners, and recognition of the Russian Tsar's authority. Failure to comply threatened the execution of the Kabardian hostages in Terek and the burning of Kabardia itself. Shojenuqo refused to admit his guilt or release the prisoners without ransom. Well aware of the imbalance of power between Russia and Kabardia, and seeking to avoid a devastating Russian invasion, Alejuqo and Hatokhshoqo made the difficult decision to resettle their people beyond the Kuban, where they enjoyed relative safety and could quickly receive aid from Western Circassia and Lesser Nogai in the event of Russian aggression. Moreover, these lands fell within the Crimean Khanate's sphere of influence, and any presence of Russian troops there would have raised concerns in Bakhchisarai and Istanbul. At the end of 1641, Qazy's Kabardia overran the Kuban region.

Having forced the Kabardians to resettle, the Russian government quickly realized its mistake. The vast lands abandoned by the Kabardians began to attract the attention of the numerous and highly warlike Kalmyks, a people who had recently arrived in the Volga region and the North Caucasus. If these lands were seized by the Kalmyks, who at that time were experiencing difficult relations with Russia, the city of Terek would be isolated from Russia, posing a real threat to Russian influence in the Caucasus. Less than a year later, Russia began seeking ways to normalize relations with Alejuqo. However, initial requests and attempts to persuade the Kabardians to return to their former homes were unsuccessful. Alejuqo had every reason to distrust the Terek governors. The Moscow government then recalled Alejuqo's son-in-law, Mutsal Cherkassky, who had been exiled to Siberia. He was urgently brought to Moscow, all charges were dropped, and all positions and powers in the Terek city were restored to him. At a reception in the Kremlin on August 20, 1642, the tsar personally instructed him to return Kabardia from the Kuban region to Beshtaugorye.

Mutsal Cherkassky returned to the Terek city only in March 1643. After consulting with the Terek voivodes, Mutsal sent his uzden, Biksha Aliy, and the boyar's son, Andrei Senin, to negotiate with Alejuqo. For Alejuqo Shojenuqo, the time had come to make a difficult choice between the Crimean Khanate and the Russian state. Both regional powers readily offered promises to protect Kabardia in the event of aggression from their rivals during negotiations, but rarely fulfilled these promises. Crimea wielded greater influence over Kabardia in the Caucasus, which it often abused, occasionally demanding heavy tribute from the Kabardians and sending tens and hundreds of Adyghe to the slave markets of Bakhchisarai. Unsurprisingly, Kabardia waged war with Crimea almost every year. Even during periods of alliance between the Kabardians and the Tatars, small Crimean detachments raided the Adyghe for the purpose of plunder and the capture of slaves.

By this time, Alejuqo and Hatokhshoqo's relatives had already lost power in Bakhchisarai, along with the period of relative harmony and alliance between Kabardia and Bakhchisarai. Oppression and demands for increased tribute began. Envoys from Mutsal Cherkassky arrived at a favorable moment with proposals to improve relations with Russia. The Adyghe people's longstanding hostility toward the Tatars made itself felt, and Alejuqo gave preliminary consent to an alliance with Russia. Since Crimean troops were stationed nearby, negotiations were conducted in strict secrecy. For security reasons, Alejuqo even took the envoys' letters from the Terek voivodes himself and entrusted his own written message, addressed to the Russian voivodes, to be delivered only to his trusted assistant, Bezruko Akhmet. Arriving in Terek on April 4, 1643, the envoy, together with Bezruko, informed the Terek governors of Alejuqo's response: he could not come to the Terek city to swear allegiance, as the Crimeans would immediately learn of it and would send an army of Turks and Tatars marching on Azov against the Kabardian auls. Returning immediately to their former lands was also impossible, as the lands had already been plowed for grain. Alejuqo's envoys, led by Bezruko Akhmet, assured the Terek governors of the Kabardians' loyalty to Russia and proposed continuing negotiations later on the Kura River, in the Nizhnyaya Izgolov tract. Apparently, Alejuqo was not yet inclined to fully trust the Terek governors.

On May 16, Mutsal Cherkassky and the Terek voivode Efim Samarin met with Alejuqo, who was accompanied by two tlekotleshi, five Nogai murzas, and 52 uorki. The negotiations were successful, and the parties agreed to continue them in Terek. Having received firm guarantees of non-detention in Terek, the Kabardian delegation arrived there on May 20. Negotiations took place on the second day of their stay in the city. The Russian side was represented by the Terek voivodes Mikhail Volynsky, Efim Samarin, Vasily Atarsky, and Mutsal Cherkassky. The Terek voivodes officially announced that Alejuqo was forgiven for all his grievances against the Russian state. Alejuqo, in turn, confirmed his loyalty to Tsar Mikhail Feodorovich. Both sides were willing to make concessions. Numerous issues concerning Russian–Kabardian relations were discussed. As soon as the harvest was gathered, the Kabardians pledged to resettle back to their original locations. The Russian side pledged not only to avoid any obstacles but also to warn Alejuqo's enemies from Lesser Kabardia and Dagestan not to attack the settlers. The issues of joint defense against the Crimean Khan, the replacement of hostages, and the swearing-in of all Kabardian, Abaza, Lesser Nogai, and other princes and uzdens subordinate to Shojenuqo were discussed. All Russian embassies, delegations, and merchant convoys passing through Kabardia received guarantees of immunity. Alejuqo promised to release all Russians captured in the Battle of Malkino and not yet ransomed by their relatives for a small ransom.

After the negotiations concluded, Alejuqo took an oath of allegiance to Russia on the Koran in his own name, in the name of Khatazhuko, and in the name of all the Kabardian, Abaza, Nogai, and other murzas and uzdens aligned with him.

Alejuqo was assigned the largest salary in the Caucasus, and he and his retinue were presented with lavish gifts. On May 22, the Kabardian delegation left Terki.

At the very beginning of 1644, the long-awaited Kalmyk invasion of Kabardia occurred. A Kalmyk army, commanded by the great Urlyuk Taisha and numbering 10,500 men, planned to defeat the Kabardians with a single surprise attack and then storm the Terek city. At the very last moment, these plans became known in Terek, but the Russian commanders, likely afraid to send their forces beyond the fortress walls, did not send them to aid the Kabardians. Only the Tatar Ishtamet Tarykulov, sent by Mutsal Cherkassky, rode to Kabardia to warn of the Kalmyk invasion. Alejuqo managed to gather his allies. When the Kalmyk army entered Kabardia, the united forces of Kabardians, Nogais, and other mountain peoples met them fully prepared. The Kalmyks, unexpectedly encountering strong resistance, were scattered and then defeated. Of the 11,500 Kalmyk warriors, only 1,500–2,000 managed to escape. The Kalmyk leader, Bolshoy Urlyuk Taisha, and his children, Gireisan-Taisha, Irgenten Taisha, and Zhelden Taisha, were killed. More than a thousand Kalmyk warriors were captured by the Kabardians, including two Kalmyk murzas, Ilgerdey Taisha and another whose name is not mentioned in the sources.

The entire Kalmyk convoy and horses fell into the hands of the Kabardians and Nogais. Upon learning of the defeat of the Kalmyks in Kabardia, the Terek voivodes sent two detachments under the command of Mutsal Cherkassky and Tatar Khan Araslanov to intercept the retreating Kalmyks, which they successfully accomplished, defeating the remnants of Urlyuk Taisha's army and capturing several prisoners. Under interrogation, the Kalmyk prisoners stated that, after Kabardia, they had intended to take the city of Terek, which they might have succeeded in doing, given the reluctance of the Terek voivodes to engage them.

It must be noted that Alejuqo was in no hurry to return to Pyatigorye. Having witnessed during the Kalmyk invasion that the Terek voivodes could not be relied upon, and fearing the Crimean Khan's threats, he continually delayed resettlement. Seeing Shojenuqo's hesitation and the Terek voivodes' shortcomings, Mutsal began urging them to provide Alejuqo with firm guarantees of protection from Crimean attacks. Cherkassky pressed for the return of the Kabardians before they completed their new sowing beyond the Kuban; otherwise, the resettlement would be delayed for another year. Only by threatening to complain about the voivodes' inaction did Mutsal obtain permission to resume negotiations. Mutsal departed for Kabardia, returning five months later. His mission was successful: he brought new hostages to Terki, and Alejuqo resettled the population back to Pyatigorye. Qaziyev's Kabardia returned to its former locations, including the regions of Greater and Lesser Kuma, Pyatigorye, the Satey plain, Malka, Baksan, Chegem, and Cherek. However, in Russian diplomatic correspondence, Alejuqo Shojenuqo was never referred to as the Supreme Prince of Kabardia, even though the Idarovs, Shoovs, and other lesser feudal lords had already left the political scene.

At the request of their Nogai allies, Alejuqo and Khotazhuko petitioned the tsar to release the Nogai murza Shagin Giray from prison. He had been forced to collaborate with the Kalmyks and was captured while attempting to transport the remains of Urlyuk Taisha and his children, who had died in Kabardia, to Kalmykia. For this purpose, Bezruko Akhmet, accompanied by a cavalry detachment, traveled to Moscow to meet the tsar. The envoys brought five select Kabardian horses as a gift. Bezruko was received favorably, and all of Alejuqo's requests were granted. The hostages in Terki were replaced, and Shahin Giray was released from prison. For their part, some time later, the Terek voivodes approached Alejuqo with a request to bring the Nogai murzas Arslanbek Kasbulatov, Nauruz Kasayev, and Divoy Karamuzin into permanent allegiance to Tsar Alexei Mikhailovich. The Nogai murzas could not refuse Alejuqo; they swore allegiance to the Russian Tsar.

== Death and legacy ==
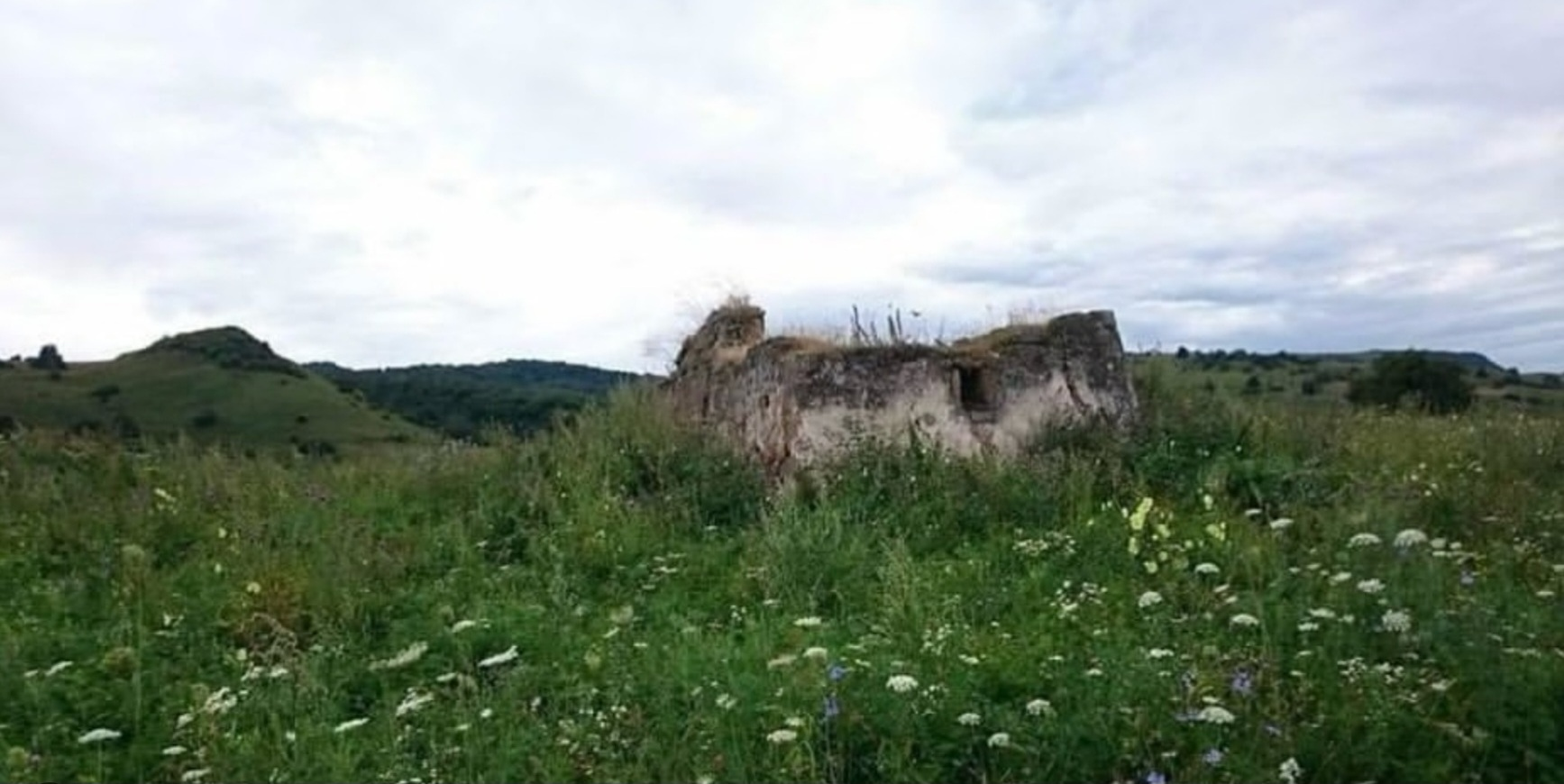
Mausoleum of Alejuqo Shojenuqo

Alejuqo died in 1654. His brother and loyal companion, Hatokhshoqo Qazi, succeeded him as the Grand Prince of Kabardia. Alejuqo ruled Kabardia for many years. He was known as an intelligent ruler, a talented diplomat, a victorious commander, and a man of immense authority not only in the Caucasus, but also in Russia, Turkey, Poland, Crimea, and Iran. In terms of significance for his people, Alejuqo Shojenuqo's name was compared to those of renowned figures of that era: the Polish commander Jeremiah Vishnevetsky, the leader of the Ukrainian War of Independence Bohdan Khmelnytsky, the brilliant naval commander Yi Sun-sin, who saved Korea from the Japanese invasion, and Iesu Tokugawa, who united fragmented Japan into a single state.
