= Aslanbech I of Kabardia =

Supreme Prince of Kabardia

Aslanbech Qeytuqo

Grand Prince of Kabardia
- Reign: 1589
- Predecessor: Qambolet of Kabardia
- Successor: Jansokh of Kabardia
- Born: 16th century Kabardia
- Died: 1589; Kabardia
- Father: Qeytuqo I of Kabardia

Aslanbech Qeytuqo was a Kabardian prince of the Qeytuqo family who played a major role in the political struggles of Kabardia during the second half of the 16th century. A leading rival of Temruqo the Brave, he headed a coalition of Kabardian princes allied with the Crimean Khanate and the Ottoman Empire against the pro-Muscovite Idarid faction. In 1589, following the death of the senior Kabardian prince Qambolet Idar, Aslanbech was chosen as Grand Prince of Kabardia, but died shortly after his election.

== Life ==
Aslanbech was the second son of Qeytuqo I and one of the prominent Kabardian princes of the 16th century. He belonged to the powerful Qeytuqo family, which played a major role in the political struggles of Kabardia during this period. Aslanbech emerged as one of the principal rivals of the Idarid dynasty, particularly of Temruqo the Brave, and became a leading figure among the Kabardian princes opposed to Temruqo's alliance with Muscovy.

=== Struggle with Temruqo ===
In the early 16th century, Prince Temruqo the Brave entered into conflict with the sons of Qeytuqo, including Aslanbech. As a result of this struggle, Temruqo was forced to migrate with his family to Lesser Kabardia. The conflict is generally considered to have stemmed from a dynastic dispute over the title of supreme prince of Kabardia. After the death of Prince Jilakhstan in the 1550s, Temruqo became the senior prince of Lesser Kabardia, and the territory under his control became known as "Idarey".

By the early 1560s, Kabardia had become divided into two opposing political coalitions. Temruqo, supported by the Tsardom of Russia and the Greater Nogai Horde, faced a rival alliance led by Shiapshoqo and Aslanbech, who were backed by the Crimean Khanate, the Lesser Nogai Horde, and indirectly by the Ottoman Empire. Although Temruqo initially achieved several successes, opposition among the Kabardian princes strengthened, and in 1563 he was forced to flee Kabardia with his sons and seek refuge in Astrakhan. Ivan the Terrible soon intervened in the conflict. Temruqo received military assistance from Astrakhan consisting of approximately 500 musketeers and 500 Cossacks, a considerable force by the standards of sixteenth-century Kabardia. With this contingent, commanded by Grigory Semyonovich Pleshcheev, Temruqo managed to return and drive his rivals from his lands. Despite these setbacks, the Qeytuqo faction remained influential. In 1566 Temruqo requested that Ivan IV build a fortress on the Terek River, warning that the Qeytuqo family, led by Aslanbech and Shiapshoqo, continued to pose a serious threat. The Muscovite tsar approved the request and in February 1567 dispatched laborers and equipment to Kabardia for the construction of the fort.

In June and July 1570, Crimean forces launched a major campaign into Circassia that inflicted heavy losses on the pro-Muscovite rulers. During the campaign Temruqo himself was severely wounded, and two of his sons were captured and taken to Crimea by Prince Adil Giray (kalga), who commanded the Crimean army. Muscovite sources indicate that the campaign had been undertaken at the request of Aslanbech, Temruqo's principal rival in Kabardia. Aslanbech's connections with the Ottomans and Crimeans appear to date back to the early 1560s, when he and his allies sought to counter the rising power of Temruqo, who had received Muscovite support in 1562–1563. According to Ottoman sources, a certain Gazi Mirza—identified in Muscovite records as Kazy Murza and possibly the son of Shiapshoqo—guided the Crimean Tatars during the campaign.

=== Alliance with Ottomans ===
In 1573 a number of Kabardian princes, including Aslanbech, formally submitted to the Ottoman Empire. From the Ottoman perspective, Kabardia was thereafter regarded as an Ottoman dependency. Ottoman correspondence referred to the region as the "Kabartay sancağı" (the province of Kabardia), and the Kabardian princes were addressed with the title of sancakbeyi. Aslanbech—named Arslan Bey in Ottoman documents—also received a stipend from the revenues of Kefe.

During the Ottoman–Safavid War (1578–1590), Aslanbech, together with his brother Jansokh and Gazi Murza, the son of Shiapshoqo, received orders from the Ottoman Sultan regarding the protection of the military and logistical routes passing through Kabardia. Their responsibilities included assisting the Ottoman army by constructing bridges across rivers and providing provisions and other supplies for troops moving toward the Caucasus front.

In September 1583, the Ottoman official Ferhad Kethüda travelled from Kefe to Derbend carrying treasury funds. To ensure the safety of the route, the Ottoman government ordered several Kabardian chiefs—including Sholokh, Beşir (Betsin, Başıl), Abak (Ibak in Muscovite sources), Bozok (Buzuruk in Muscovite sources), Aslanbech, and Jansokh—to assist Ferhad Kethüda and his entourage. As a mark of imperial favor, these leaders were presented with robes of honour.

=== Becoming the Grand Prince ===
In 1589 the senior Kabardian prince Kambolet died suddenly before completing his reign, triggering a new struggle for power among the Kabardian nobility. The political situation was reported to Moscow by the Terek voivode A. I. Khvorostinin.

"There was great unrest among them during the reign of the princes, and, sir, no one had yet been appointed to the throne. They say that Kanbulat's son will rule them this year; and when Kanbulat's year passes, then Prince Oslanbek will rule them."

According to these reports, Aslanbech was expected to become the next grand prince of Kabardia after the completion of the temporary rule attributed to Qambolet Idar's son. Despite the continuing influence of Muscovy in Kabardian affairs, Aslanbech attained this prestigious position while remaining aligned with the Crimean Khanate and the Ottoman Sultan. However, his tenure proved brief, as Aslanbech died shortly after his elevation to the position of grand prince in 1589.

== Sources ==
- Yaşar, Murat (2022). The North Caucasus Borderland: Between Muscovy and the Ottoman Empire, 1555–1605 (PDF). Edinburgh Studies on the Ottoman Empire. Edinburgh: Edinburgh University Press. ISBN 9781474498692.
