= Qambolet of Kabardia =

Grand Prince of Kabardia between 1571–1589

Qambolet Yidar
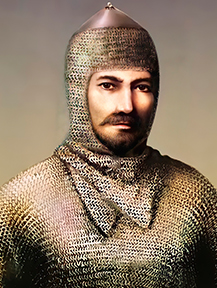
- Modern depiction of Qambolet Idar

Grand Prince of Kabardia
- Reign: 1571–1589
- Predecessor: Temruqo the Brave
- Successor: Aslanbech I of Kabardia
- Born: 1508; Kabardia
- Died: 1589; Kabardia
- Issue: Sons: Qudenet (Note: Kabardian: Къудэнет Russian: Куденет); Yecheqan (Note: Kabardian: Ечэкъан Russian: Ечекан); Qarashey (Note: Kabardian: Къэрэщай Russian: Хорошай); Pshimakho (Note: Kabardian: Пщымахуэ Russian: Пшимахо); Haqiyagho (Note: Kabardian: Хьэкъиягъуэ Russian: Хакяго); Daughters: Babasupkh (Note: Kabardian: Бэбэсыпхъу Russian: Бабасупх); Sestra (Note: Russian: Сестра)
Names
- Qambolet, son of Yidar
- Kabardian: Айдар и къуэ Къамболэт
- House: Inalid dynasty; House of Idar
- Father: Yidar Yinarmas

Qambolet Yidar (Note: Kabardian: Айдар Къамболэт Russian: Камбулат Идарович) was a Kabardian prince of the Idar family who served as Grand Prince of Kabardia in the late 16th century, succeeding his brother Temruqo Yidar. He ruled during a period marked by shifting alliances between Muscovy and the Crimean Khanate, as well as ongoing conflicts involving the Nogai Horde and neighboring Caucasian powers.

== Biography ==
After the death of Temruqo Idar, he was succeeded by his brother, Qambolet, as the Grand Prince of Kabardia. The Muscovites appear to have had no role in his election, as he was chosen solely by the Kabardian princes. Due to the presence of Crimean forces nearby and the death of Temruqo, Qambolet initially had little choice but to maintain the traditional Kabardian–Crimean pattern of relations rather than fully aligning with Muscovy.

In 1576, the forces of the Lesser Nogai bey Ghazi ibn Urak invaded Lesser Kabardia, but were defeated by the Kabardians led by the Idars of Qambolet and the Talostaneys of Sholokh Tepsaruqo. Although Nogai forces initially inflicted heavy losses, they were ambushed and defeated during their retreat. In addition to Ghazi ibn Urak, two of his brothers and several of his sons, as well as Iman-Girey and Chebar-Murza, were killed by Kabardian forces during the fighting. Pshiapshoqo Qeytuqo fought on the side of the Nogais and the Crimean Khanate, pursuing a pro-Crimean policy.

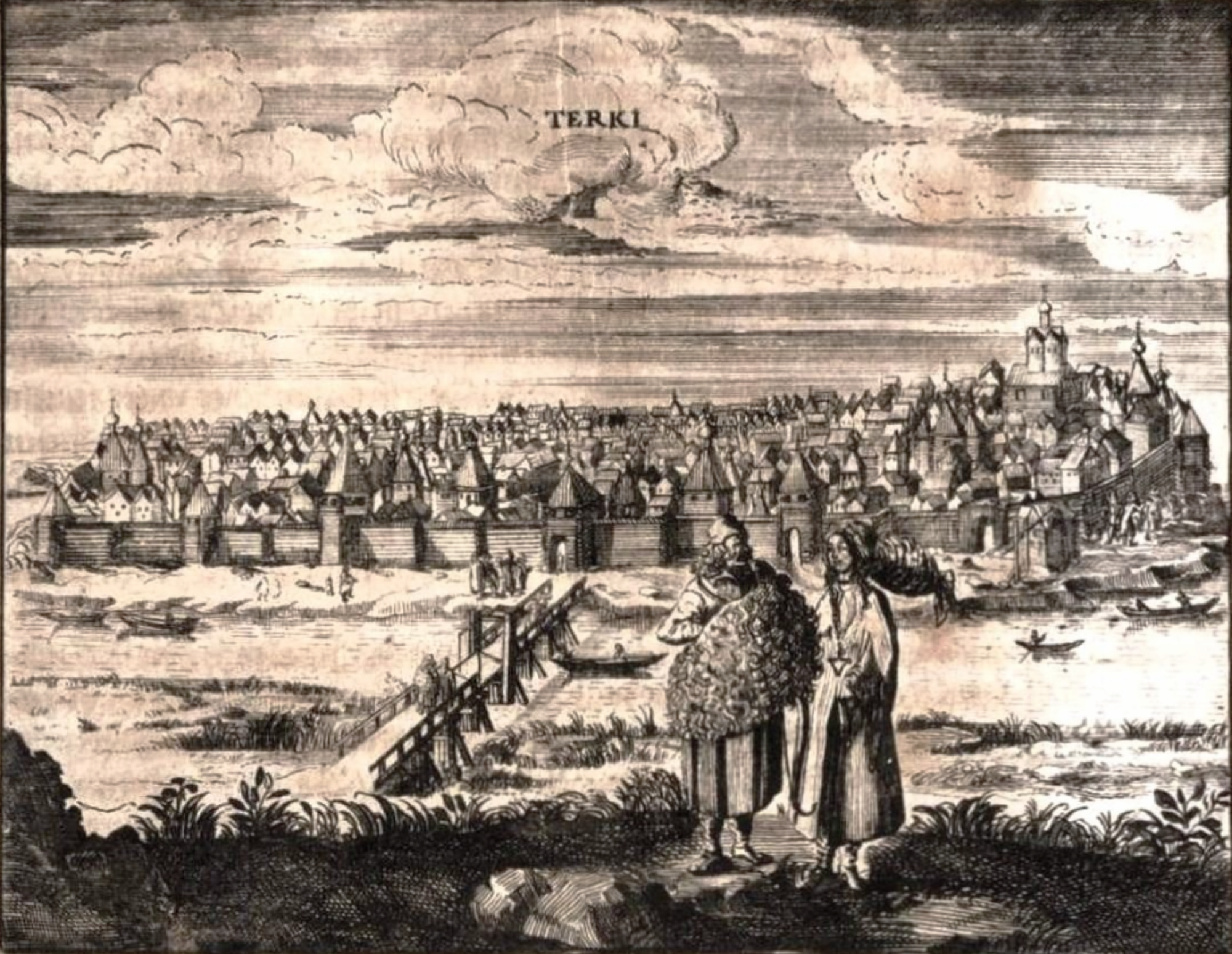
The town of Terek, drawn by Adam Olearius, published in 1647

In the spring of 1578, an embassy headed by Qambolet arrived in Moscow. In accordance with the "shertnaya gramota," Qambolet pledged service to Tsar Ivan IV and his son, Tsarevich Ivan Ivanovich. Qambolet's son, Qarashay, who accompanied the embassy, remained in Moscow, where he was baptized as Boris Kambulatovich Cherkassky. Qambolet received a "large charter" bearing the "30-lot seal" of Ivan IV. At the same time, Luka Novosiltsev was sent to Kabardia "with many men and with firepower," along with carpenters, to construct a Russian fortress. During this period, the Crimean Kalga Adil Giray, en route to Shirvan, requested passage across the Sunzha River, which was guarded by the Terek Cossacks. The Crimean army was later defeated in Iran, and during its retreat, Novosiltsev's forces attacked its remnants and captured horses. The kalga himself was captured in Iran. Qambolet's original charter has not survived, as noted by S. A. Belokurov:

"The pillar is dilapidated and fallen apart." It is known from another document issued by Ivan IV to the Kabardian prince Mamstruk Temryukovich, which mentions the "shert" of 1578. It also refers to Novosiltsev, sent to Kabardia to build a city. The tsar emphasized that "in that city, one can be fearless of your wealth. And we have granted our large charter with our golden seal, in accordance with your petition, to Prince Kambulat of Kabarda, as you are entitled to the entire Cherkasy land in our favor..."

The Terek city built by Novosiltsev did not last long; its construction provoked protests from the Crimean Khanate. In 1579, under Crimean pressure and due to the difficult situation faced by Russia, particularly during the Livonian War, it was dismantled. However, in 1588, a new fort was established at the mouth of the Terek River, garrisoned by Streltsy and equipped with artillery. Its commander was A. I. Khvorostinin. Despite these developments, Kabardia's relations with Russia continued.

In January 1588, Qambolet's son, Qudenet Qambolet, and Temruqo's son, Mamstruk, arrived in Moscow with a petition requesting protection from the Crimeans, Sholokh Tepsaruqo, and the Qeytuqo family. Both envoys swore allegiance to the Russian state on July 25, during the reign of Tsar Fyodor I Ivanovich. In response, the tsar accepted them "into his royal pay, under his strong hand," promised protection, and ordered the construction of a fortified settlement. The envoys returned to Kabardia in August. The tsar's charter confirmed the continuation of relations between Russia and Kabardia, in which Qambolet and his son Qudenet played a central role. The Qeytuqos, Talostans, and Jilakhstans remained aligned with the Crimean Khanate and the Shamkhalate of Tarki.

Qambolet Idar died in 1589. His death triggered a renewed power struggle within Kabardia between the Qeytuqeys allied with Idareys against the principality of Talostaney.

== In folklore ==
Folkloric records associate Qambolet with the Circassian heroic epic cycle about Andemirqan. According to genealogical traditions and contemporary historical analysis, Qambolet's father, Idar, returned to Kabardia in the late 1530s following the Battle of Kyzburun.

In the folklore cycle of Prince Andemirqan, an idealized knight of the Circassian folklore, Qambolet was consistently portrayed as an antagonist. Most prose and poetic texts identify Qambolet, including his brothers Bitu and Qidirshiqo, as the organizers of Andemirqan's death. Historical reconstructions based on these oral traditions and indirect written sources date this event to the early 1540s.

The oral tradition describes Qambolet as a sworn brother of Andemirqan who betrayed this bond of loyalty. Qambolet led Andemirqan into an ambush by deceiving him during a hunt. Folk songs specify that Qambolet persuaded Andemirqan to swap his superior horse, Jemanshariq, for an inferior mount and to exchange his sword for another which left him vulnerable. Qambolet then led the unarmed Andemirqan to a trench or wooded trap in the Chegem or Cherek forest where his brothers and other enemies lay in wait. Historical variants of the "Song of Andemirqan" recorded in the 19th and 20th centuries emphasize Qambolet's role in the physical and tactical isolation of the protagonist, resulting in Andemirqan's death.

The following excerpt from the Andemirkan cycle shows the narrative of the betrayal from the perspective of the protagonist:

Къэбэрдейм япщо пщы гущэу Къаниболэтыр си щэуэгъут,
Ныбжьэгъум и тхьэр Къэниболэтым къыреуэ
ТхьэкIэ сегъапцIэри щIым и пцIэнэпIэм сырешэ,
Сыкъыдешэри жылэшхуэ пэкIум сарет,
Сыкъезытам и псэу гъуэгъуншэ ирехъу!
...

Translation:

Of the princes of Kabardia, Prince Qambolet was my trusted friend,
May the God of friendship curse Qambolet,
By perjury he brings me to the bare earth,
He brings me and hands me over to a large gathering,
May the soul of the one who gave me up be filled without hope!
...

== Sources ==
- Kardanov, Ch. E. (2016). Князья Кабарды [Princes of Kabarda] (in Russian). Nalchik: Izdatel'stvo M. i V. Kotlyarovykh. ISBN 978-5-93680-971-2.
