= Jansokh of Kabardia =

Jansokh Qeytuqo

Grand Prince of Kabardia
- Reign: 1589 – 1590s
- Predecessor: Aslanbech I of Kabardia
- Successor: Sholokh the Mighty
- Born: 16th century Kabardia
- Died: Between 1592–1596; Kabardia
- Issue: Sons: Surkhay; Dokhushoqo; Yelmurz; Kilish; Wuriskhan
Names
- Jansokh, son of Qeytuqo
- Kabardian: Къетыкъуэ и къуэ Жансэхъу
- Father: Qeytuqo of Kabardia
- Religion: Sunni Islam

Jansokh Qeytuqo (Note: Kabardian: Къетыкъуэ Жансэхъу Russian: Янсох Кайтуков Turkish: Jansoh Keytıqo) was a Kabardian prince of the Qeytuqo family and a political figure in Kabardia during the late 16th century. He was the son of Qeytuqo of Kabardia and the brother of Aslanbech I of Kabardia. Jansokh is noted in contemporary Ottoman and Muscovite sources as one of the leading Kabardian nobles of his time and as a participant in the diplomatic and political affairs of the North Caucasus.

== Early life ==
Jansokh was the fifth and youngest the son of Qeytuqo of Kabardia and belonged to the Qeytuqo family. He was a main rival of Temruqo. During the Ottoman–Safavid War (1578–1590), he received orders from the Ottoman Porte in the 1580s regarding the security of the Ottoman route and the provision of services for the Ottoman army passing through Kabardia.

We also know from contemporary Ottoman chronicles that he was one of the Kabardian chiefs who constructed bridges on the Terek River for the Ottoman armies and guided them through Kabardia. Although the Muscovites regarded him as an important figure in Kabardian politics, Ottoman documents describe him as merely a local ruler among several others.

In September 1583, Ferhad Kethüda was traveling to Derbend from Caffa with another load of treasury. To secure his route, the Porte sent orders to Jansokh and his brother Aslanbech. Receiving robes of honour, they were asked to assist Ferhad Kethüda and his men.

== Reign ==
Following the death of Qambolet, Aslanbech I Qeytuqo, who was an ally of Ottomans at the time, became the Grand Prince of Kabardia. With Aslanbech's election as the grand prince, position of the Grand Prince passed from the Idarey family to the Qeytuqo family. When the tsar's envoys arrived in Kabardia in 1589, however, they learned that Aslanbech had died, and now "the Kabardians wanted to make his brother, Jansokh, the Grand Prince of Kabardia". Jansokh was elected as the new Grand Prince of Kabardia in October 1589, as reported to Moscow by the governor of Terek. Unlike his brother Aslanbech, who allied with the Ottomans and the Crimeans, Jansokh submitted to the Tsardom of Russia and settled with an alliance to the Tsar.

The reorientation of the Qeytuqo dynasty was tied to internal rivalries within Kabardia and the Ottoman–Safavid war, which limited Ottoman involvement in the region. Jansokh was elected the Grand Prince by a group of Kabardian chiefs, likely on the understanding that he would maintain relations with Moscow, as had become common among local nobles in the late sixteenth century. His main rivals, Sholokh and Alkhas, were aligned with the Ottoman Empire and the Crimean Khanate, but these powers were unable to provide steady military support. By contrast, pro-Muscovite chiefs could rely on assistance from the Terek garrison, making cooperation with the Tsar the most effective way for Jansokh to secure and consolidate his position.

Sholokh and Alkhas, identified by the Muscovites as allies of the Ottoman Empire or the Crimean Khanate, were among the more prominent Kabardian rulers whose cooperation was important for Muscovy's plans in the region. To secure their loyalty, Muscovite authorities planned to offer gifts and regular payments, and, if necessary, to rely on displays of military force.

When Muscovite envoys arrived in Kabardia in the autumn of 1589, both Sholokh and Alkhas initially refused to meet them, despite promises of reward. Reports from local Cossacks indicate that Mamstruk and Kudenet attempted to bring Sholokh to the envoys, but he refused, reportedly because of their association with the establishment of Muscovite forts and troops in the Terek region. This response reflected a broader concern among some Kabardian chiefs, who viewed Muscovite fortresses and garrisons as a direct threat to their autonomy.

In November 1589, a coalition of the Qeytuqo and Idarey factions launched a coordinated military campaign against the Principality of Talostaney owned by Sholokh Tepsaruqo, because of his political rivalry with Russia. They were supported by approximately 750 Russian Cossack troops sent from the Terek voivodeship under the command of Grigory Poltev. The operation aimed to eliminate Talostaney resistance and prevent outside influence from Ottoman, Crimean, and Kumyk-aligned forces. The allied forces held a significant numerical advantage, fielding around 4,500 cavalry compared to Talostaney's estimated 2,000 horsemen. The campaign was conducted rapidly and with heavy destruction. Contemporary accounts describe the burning or capture of more than 30 out of roughly 40 settlements in Talostaney territory. Sholokh Tepsaruqo's forces were decisively defeated. He was forced to submit, and compelled to recognize Jansokh Qeytuqo's authority as the Grand Prince of Kabardia. he handed over hostages, including his son Talostan and twenty other nobles.

The political crisis of 1589 seemed to have ended in complete victory for the Idareys and Qeytuqey's, as Sholokh could not be elected as the Grand Prince of Kabardia. However, This victory remained temporary, as A. I. Lobanov-Rostovsky's Genealogy directly speaks of Jansokh Qeytuqo as cited:

"The principality was given to him in Moscow under Tsar Feodor Ivanovich of all Russia, as he was in Moscow, but in Kabarda they did not give him a principality"

Meaning, he was formally recognised as the Grand Prince of Kabardia by Russia, but the Kabardian council did not accept him as one. He visited Moscow in 1592 and apparently only then officially received the charter for the principality. But even after this, his recognition in Kabardia as a legitimate Grand Prince did not occur.

It is difficult to determine the exact duration of Jansokh's reign in Kabardia, as there are discrepancies in the sources, but his death is most likely between 1592 and 1596.

== Sources ==
- Yaşar, Murat (2022). The North Caucasus Borderland: Between Muscovy and the Ottoman Empire, 1555–1605 (PDF). Edinburgh Studies on the Ottoman Empire. Edinburgh: Edinburgh University Press. ISBN 9781474498692.
- Kardanov, Ch. E. (2021). Knyazya Kabardy (Princes of Kabarda). Kavkaz (in Russian). Vol. 21. Nalchik: Izdatel'stvo M. i V. Kotlyarovykh. ISBN 978-5-93680-971-2.
- Kozhev, Zaurbek A. (2023). "Internal Political Crisis in the Kabarda in 1589: Background, Historical Context, Implications". Электронный Журнал «Кавказология» / Caucasology (in Russian) (4): 40–54. doi:10.31143/2542-212X-2023-4-40-54.
