= Grand Prince of Kabardia =

Title given to the noble ruling class in the Princedom of Kabardia

The Grand Prince of Kabardia (Kabardian: Къэбэрдеим и пщышхуэ) was the title given to the Kabardian rulers. In Russian sources, it is referred to as the Kabardian governor. In the late 18th century, the term Pshi Thamada was used to denote the title by the Kabardians, which was mentioned in 16th-19th century Russian sources as the Grand Duke, or Grand Prince. All Kabardian princes and dynasties claim descent from Inal the Great. The Grand Prince of Kabardia was elected by the votes of other princes and first-ranked nobles. This title could only be attained through election and could not be passed down unlawfully from father to son. The Grand Prince of Kabardia was a nominal vassal of the Prince of Princes of Circassia.

== List of Grand Princes ==
=== List of early Grand Princes ===
The list of rulers for the period before Temruqo of Kabardia is derived from two primary historical traditions. The first is based on 17th-century Russian records, which documented the oral genealogies provided by Kabardian princes arriving in Moscow. The second follows the 16th-century Arabic manuscript "al-Uqud al-Jawhariyya fi al-Mahasin al-Dawla al-Ashrafiyya al-Ghawriyya" (Precious Necklaces Concerning the Merits of the State of al-Ashraf al-Ghawri). This chronicle identifies Kabardia as a distinct political entity by the 1440s and provides an earlier written account of the princely genealogy than the later Russian sources. The chronicle specifically details the period from the mid to late 15th century and does not extend into later successions. These two traditions offer different grand princes for the early Kabardian rulers.

==== List according to 17th-century Russian records (Oral tradition) ====
Prince	Native name	Reign	Death date	Description
Inal "the Blind"	Хъурыфэлъей и къуэ Инал Нэф	See Dating of Inal	See Dating of Inal	Legendary ancestor of the Circassian princes.
Tabuldu	Инал и къуэ Тэбылду	XV. century	Unknown	Son of Inal
Yinarmas	Тэбылду и къуэ Инэрмэс	First half of XVI. century	Unknown	Son of Tabuldu
Jankhot I	Тэбылду и къуэ Жанхъуэт	First half of XVI. century	Unknown	Son of Tabuldu
Beslan "the Fat"	Жанхъуэт и къуэ Беслъэн	First half of XVI. century	1530s	Son of Jankhot
Yidar	Инэрмэс и къуэ Айдар / Идар	First half of XVI. century	1537/1538	Son of Yinarmas
Qeytuqo	Беслъэн и къуэ Къетыкъуэ	First half of XVI. century–1550s	Unknown	Son of Beslan

==== List according to the 16th-century Arabic manuscript (Al-Uqud al-Jawhariyya) ====
Prince	Native name	Reign	Death date	Description
Inal "the Blind"	Хъурыфэлъей и къуэ Инал Нэху	See Dating of Inal	See Dating of Inal	Legendary ancestor of the Circassian princes.
Tabuldu	Тэбылду	Unknown	Unknown	
Qirqilish	Къыркълыш	1440s–1450s	1450s	Descendant of Tabuldu. Brother of Minbolet and Jankhot. Ruled for 7 years. Killed during a hunting trip with his 70 noblemen.
Minbolet	Минболэт	1450s–1460s	1460s	Descendant of Tabuldu. Brother of Qirqilish and Jankhot. Chosen by the council of elders. Ruled for 16 years and 16 days. Converted to Islam in the 5th year of his reign, end of 1450s.
Jankhot I	Жанхъуэт	Unknown		Descendant of Tabuldu. Brother of Qirqilish and Minbolet. He seized the throne by force with the Tatar army, but lost his power when he failed in his rule.
Qeban	Къыркълыш и къуэ Къэбан	Unknown		Sons of Qirqilish. They ruled Kabardia together. During a conflict between Yelberdiy and Minbolet's son Bora, Yelberdiy was killed, and Qaban died of grief.
Yelberdiy	Къыркълыш и къуэ Елбэрдий	Unknown		Sons of Qirqilish. They ruled Kabardia together. During a conflict between Yelberdiy and Minbolet's son Bora, Yelberdiy was killed, and Qaban died of grief.
Bora	Минболэт и къуэ Борэ	1470s	Unknown	Minbolet's son. Bora was the grand prince during the period when Qansuh al-Ghawri's family migrated to Egypt (approximately 1470s).
Qeytuqo	Къетыкъуэ	Unknown	1480s	Killed in a conflict with his rival and cousin, Jilakhstan.
Jilakhstan	Минболэт и Жылахъстэн	Unknown	1491	Minbolet's son. He engaged in a years-long power struggle with his rival Qeytuqo, eventually eliminating Qeytuqo and seizing control of the entire country. During the power struggle, he received support from the Yaqub Aq Qoyunlu and Farruh Yasar, and accepted Islam in Shirvan.
Mirza	Жылахъстэн и къуэ Мырзэ	Unknown		Son of Jilakhstan. After his father's death, he ruled Kabardia by dividing it with his uncle Talostan, as decided by the council of elders. He was killed by Talostan.
Talostan	Талъостэн	End of 15th century	Unknown	Brother of Qeytuqo, uncle of Mirza. He refused to share power and killed Mirza. By the last period of the 15th century, he became the sole ruler of Kabardia.

=== List of Grand Princes (Historical Period) ===
Prince	Native name	Reign	Death date	Description	Dynasty
Temruqo "the Brave"	Айдар и къуэ Темырыкъу	1550s–1571	1571	Son of Yidar	Yidar
Qambolet	Айдар и къуэ Къамболэт	1571–1589	1589	The youngest son of Yidar.	Yidar
Aslanbech I	Къетыкъуэ и къуэ Аслъэнбэч	1589	1589	Son of Qeytuqo	
Jansokh	Къетыкъуэ и къуэ Жансэхъу	1589–c. 1590s	Between 1592–1596	The youngest son of Qeytuqo.	
Sholokh "the Mighty"	Тепсэрыкъу и къуэ Щолэхъу	1609–1616	1616	The younger brother of Beslan, grandson of Prince Talostan	Talostan
Qudenet	Къамболэт и къуэ Къудэнет	1616–1624	1624	Son of Qambolet	Yidar
Alejuqo	Щоджэныкъуэ и къуэ Алыджыкъуэ	1624–1654	1654	Grandson of Pshiapshoqo.	Shojenuqo
Hatokhshoqo I	Къазый и къуэ ХьэтIохъущокъуэ	1654–1672	1672	Son of Qaziy, who was killed in 1615, grandson of Pshiapshoqo. Founder of the Hatokhshoqo dynasty.	Hatokhshoqo
Misost I	Къазый и къуэ Мысост	1672–1695	1695	Founder of the Misost dynasty.	Misost
Kurghoqo	ХьэтIохъущокъуэ Къазый и къуэ Кургъокъуэ	1695–1709/10	1709/1710		Hatokhshoqo
Hatokhshoqo II	Мысост и къуэ ХьэтIохъущокъуэ	1709/10— 1721	1721	Son of Qaziy Misost.	Misost
Yislambech	Мысост и къуэ Ислъамбэч	1721–1732	1732		Misost
Tatarkhan "the Golden"	Бэчмырзэ и къуэ Тэтэрхъан	1732–1737	1737	The oldest son of Bechmirza Jembulat, Founder of the Bechmirza dynasty.	Bechmirza
Aslanbech II "the Red-mustached"	Къетыкъуэ и къуэ Аслъэнбэч	1737–1746	1746	The oldest son of Qeytuqo Jembulat.	Qeytuqo
Batoqo	Бэчмырзэ и къуэ Бэтокъуэ	1746–1749	1752	The fourth son of Bechmirza.	Qeytuqo
Jembulat	Къетыкъуэ и къуэ Джамболат	1749–1753	Unknown	Son of Qeytuqo Jambot	Qeytuqo
Bemat	ХьэтIохъущокъуэ Кургъокъуэ и къуэ Бэмат (Мухьэмэд)	1752–1762	1762	The oldest son of Kurghoqo.	Hatokhshoqo
Qasey	ХьэтIохъущокъуэ и къуэ Къасей	1762–1773	1773		Misost
Jankhot II	Тэтэрхъан и къуэ Жанхъуэт	1773–1785	1785		Bechmirza
Misost II "the Great"	ХьэтIохъущокъуэ Бэмат и къуэ Мысост	1785–1788	1788		Hatokhshoqo
Hatokhshoqo III	Хьэмырзэ и къуэ ХьэтIохъущокъуэ	1788–1806	1806	In the 1793–1809 conflict	Qeytuqo
Hatokhshoqo IV	ХьэтIохъущокъуэ и къуэ ХьэтIохъущокъуэ	1809	1809	Son of Misost Bematuqo	Hatokhshoqo
Kushuk	Жанхъуэт и къуэ Кушыку	1809–1822	1758–1830		Bechmirza
