= Daryal campaign (1596–1597) =

Kabardians (Circassians) war with Georgians and Ingush peoples in 1596-1597

The Daryal Gorge Campaign
- Part of Circassian–Ingush wars and Circassian–Georgian war (1587–1604)
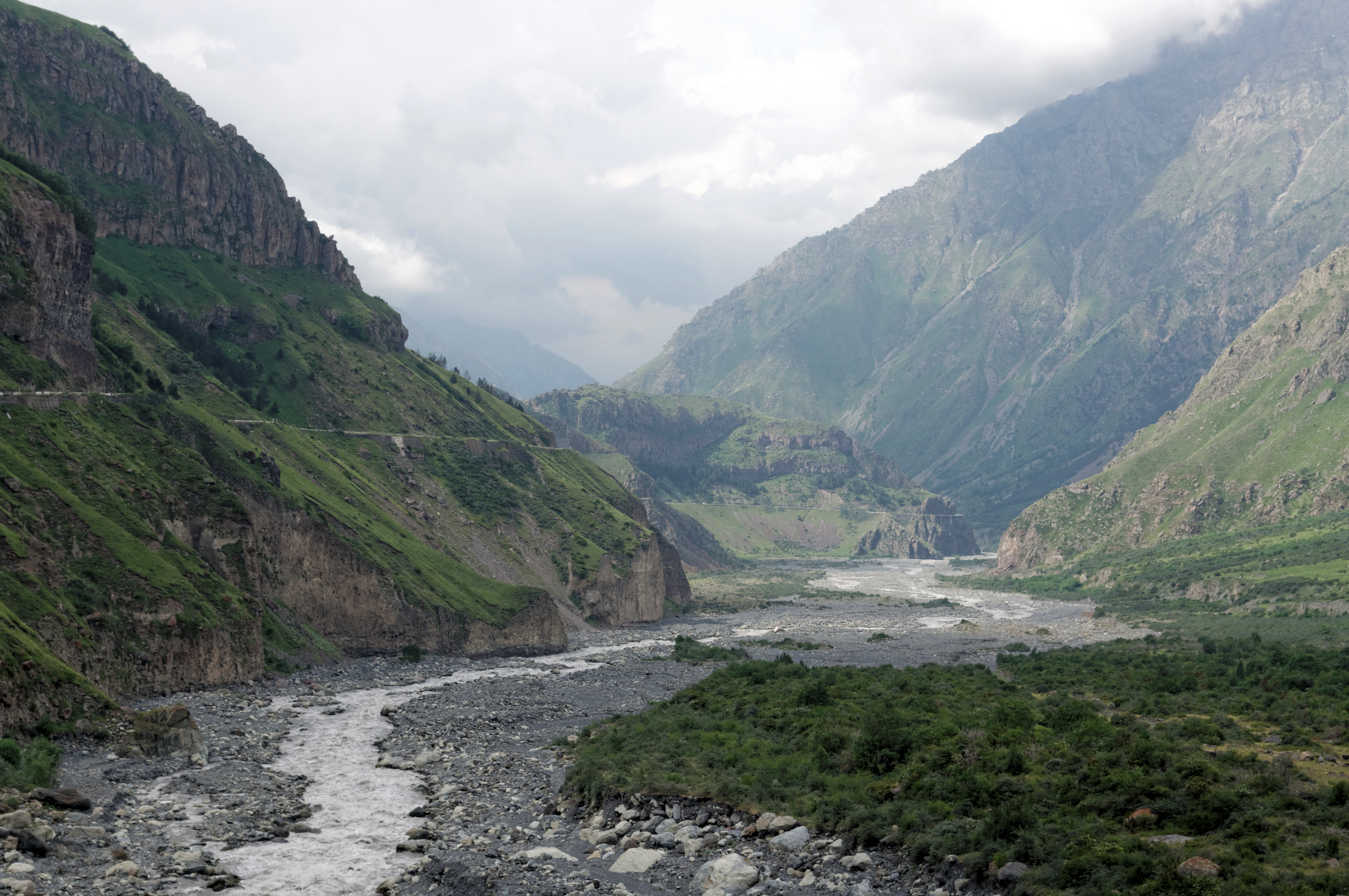
- A view of the Darial Gorge near Georgian–North Ossetian border
Date	1596–1597
Location	Daryal Gorge, Ingush territories, Kingdom of Kartli
Result	Circassian victory
Territorial changes	• Kabardian occupation of Northern Daryal Gorge • Pillaging and temporary control over Eastern Georgian lands

Belligerents
Lesser Kabardia; Talostaney	Ingushes of Darial Gorge; Kingdom of Kartli; Lesser Kabardia; Jilakhstaney

Commanders and leaders
Sholokh Tepsaruqo; Aytech Qanshau	Sultan Larsinsky; Alexander II; Mudar Alkhas

Strength
Unknown	Unknown

Casualties and losses
Unknown	Heavy; many killed or taken prisoner

The Daryal Campaign or the Kabardian Invasion of Daryal Gorge (1596–1597) was a military conflict in the Caucasus involving the Kabardians and their incursion through the Daryal Gorge into the territories of the Vainakh, in particular Ingush societies and the eastern Georgian Kingdom of Kartli.

== Background ==
In 1557, Kabarda voluntarily accepted the Russian suzerainty, which strengthened Kabardian influence in the North Caucasus and established a formal political ties with the Tsardom of Russia. These relations were further solidified in 1561 by the marriage of Maria Temryukovna, daughter of the Kabardian prince Temruqo Yidar, to Tsar Ivan IV.

In October 1562, an army under the command of Temruqo Yidar, composed of Kabardians, Nogais, and Cossacks, launched a campaign into the central Caucasus. According to historical sources, including the Nikon Chronicle, the objective was to seize the lands inhabited by the Ingush people between the Terek and Sunzha rivers.

In the 16th century, the Ingush lived primarily in the plains, but a series of invasions by the Mongols, Timur, and later regional powers forced much of the population into the mountains.

The campaign was supported by Nogai murzas and a Russian detachment of 1,000 Cossacks under Grigory Pleshcheev, sent by Ivan IV. According to Russian chronicles, a total of 164 settlements were destroyed. The Ingush population again retreated into the mountains, and Kabardian settlers occupied the de-populated lowlands.

== The war ==
In 1596, Kabardian forces led by princes Sholokh and Aytech-Murza advanced through the Daryal Gorge, seizing fortified settlements (’‘kabaki’’) belonging to Sultan-Murza, an Ingush owner of the village of Lars in the 16th century. After establishing control in the highlands, they moved southward into Kartli's mountainous borderlands, specifically targeting the Sioni and Ksani regions.

In May 1597, King Alexander II of Kartli reported the incursion to Russian envoys Kuzma Savin and Andrei Polukhanov. According to their account, Alexander informed them that “Sholokh, the Kabardian ruler, and Aytech-Murza” had invaded the “land of Soni,” killing many and taking numerous captives. The term “ruler” (’‘gosudar’’) used by Alexander in reference to Sholokh suggests a recognition—possibly tactical—of his authority among the Kabardians.

=== Role of Alexander II of Kakheti ===
The same report noted that another Kabardian noble, referred to as "Gosudar Alkhas," (Mudar Alkhas) had warned King Alexander about Sholokh's actions and even released many of the captives taken during the raid. In retaliation, Sholokh attempted to incite Russian voivodes stationed in Terek to join him in military action against Mudar.

In response, Alexander sent a letter to the Russian commanders urging them not to act against Mudar. He assured them that if Mudar had offended the Russian Tsar in any way, he would soon "correct his mistake, fully submit to the Tsar, and remain eternally loyal."

== Aftermath ==
=== Kabardian Expansion in the Early 17th Century ===
In the early 17th century, the most active political and military force in the central Caucasus region was represented by the Kabardian princes. Supported by loyal retainers and allied nobles, they sought to gain control over strategic routes leading into eastern Georgia. By 1604, Kabardian influence had expanded to the vicinity of the Daryal Gorge, a key passage connecting the North Caucasus with the Kingdom of Kartli. Prince Aytech secured control over an alternative mountain route leading to the "land of Soni"—a designation referring to the domain of the Ksani eristavi.

In 1604–1605, a Russian embassy moved along the Darial Gorge towards the land of the Sons or Ossetians and, having passed Larsov kabak (the village of Lars), on the very first night's camp came under attack from 'the mountain people with arquebuses, The attackers were identified as the Kalkans (Ingush) – highlanders from the mountains of Galgay in the Darial Gorge. According to a contemporary Russian report, they had previously been subjects of Alkhas Jamirza, but by that time they had switched allegiance to Aytech Qanshau.

Kabardian feudal lords conducted raids into Georgian territory, attacking the lands of the Ksani eristavi, capturing inhabitants, and asserting intermittent military pressure on border regions.
