= Kabardian Civil War (1639–1641) =

- Part of Civil Wars in Kabardia
Date	April 1639–July 12, 1641
Location	North Caucasus, Kabardia
Result	Alejuqo's Coalition victory
Territorial changes	Alejuqo Shojenuqo established power over most of Kabardia

Belligerents
Qaziy Kabardia; Lesser Nogai Horde; Abazashta	Lesser Kabardia; Talostaney; Jilakhstaney; Yidarey; Tsardom of Russia; Nogai Horde; Shamkhalate of Tarki; Bragun Principality

Commanders and leaders
Alejuqo Shojenuqo; Hatokhshoqo Qaziy; Alejuqo Sanjalay; Mutsal Cherkassy; Soltan-murza Kasayev; Saralp Lou; Qaziy Doruqva	Chalimat Qudenet †; Narchu Yelbezduqo; Mudar Alkhas X Yeldar Yibaq †; Tatarkhan Aslan (POW); Akhle Aytech (POW); Chalimat Yibaq; Qaziy Mudar; Tenjekhan Aslan; Saltanash-murza Aksakov; Khoroshai Chubarmametev (Tsardom of Russia) Artemy Shishmarev † (Tsardom of Russia) Dmitry Gochakov; Aydemir I †; Giray-murza †; Savtai-murza †; Elmurza †; Mamudaley; Kazanali; Kudenet Bragunsky (POW)

Strength
§ Battle of Malka: 2,000+; 1,350; 800–900	§ Russian Intervention; (Tsardom of Russia) 3,000; § Battle of Malka; 5,200; 1,100; 300; 1,200; 2,350; 50; (Tsardom of Russia) ~300–500; 100 Streltsy; 193 Okochans; 18 Boyars; 200 Cossacks

Casualties and losses
Unknown but less	§ Yidarey–Jilakhstaney Campaign and Assassinations: 30 killed, 270 captured; § Battle of Malka: Army annhilated; (Tsardom of Russia) 278 (excluding Cossacks); Many Murzas killed
- See § Casualties

The Kabardian Civil War of 1639–1641 was a major dynastic conflict fought in Kabardia between rival Circassian princely factions and their regional allies. The war was triggered by a bitter struggle over political hegemony, land inheritance, and foreign orientation between the pro-Russian Kambulat branch of the Yidar lineage—supported by the Tsardom of Russia—and the anti-Russian Qaziy faction, led by cousins Alejuqo Shojenuqo and Hatokhshoqo Qaziy, who aligned with the Crimean Khanate and the Lesser Nogai Horde.

The conflict escalated from territorial raids and dynastic feuds into a broader regional war involving coalitions from across the North Caucasus, including the Shamkhalate of Tarki, the Big Nogai Horde, and Tsarist troops from the Terek garrison. The war culminated on July 12, 1641, in the decisive Battle of the Malka River in the Pyatigorye region. Utilizing clever reconnaissance and a feigned retreat that drew the coalition forces into a gorge, Alejuqo Shojenuqo launched a devastating heavy cavalry counterattack that completely encircled and routed the opposing army.

The battle resulted in heavy casualties and the deaths of nearly all opposing commanders, including Chalimat Qudenet, Aydemir I, and the Russian Strelets commander Artemy Shishmarev. The victory established Qaziy Kabardia as the dominant political force in the region, effectively ended the political supremacy of the Yidar dynasty, and deepened the political fragmentation of 17th-century Kabardia.

== Background ==
From the 16th to the 18th century, Kabardia was at the epicenter of complex geopolitical rivalries between the era's major powers: the Ottoman Empire and its vassal, the Crimean Khanate; Safavid Iran; and the Tsardom of Russia. Following the death of Sholokh Tepsaruqo in 1616, the title of Grand Prince of Kabardia passed to Qudenet Qambolet, a member of the Yidar lineage. Qudenet received a royal charter and formal recognition from the other Kabardian princes. This allowed Alejuqo Shojenuqo—nephew of Qaziy Pshiapshoqo and the new leader of Greater Kabardia—to launch a campaign against Talostaney with the support of 3,000 Crimean troops. After the military defeat of the Talostaneys, their leader, Qarashey Sholokh, along with his two brothers, attempted to seek refuge in Jilakhstaney, but they were killed by princes Mudar Alkhas and Akhlo Aytech. Nevertheless, this did not prevent the Qaziy and Talostan families from subsequently forming a military alliance against the Yidars and their patron, the Tsar of Muscovy. The tsarist government secured pledges of loyalty from the Talostans and Qeytuqos—along with the delivery of hostages—only in late 1622, following a joint campaign into their lands by the Yidars and a Russian detachment from Terki.

In 1624, following Qudenet's death, the tsarist administration issued a charter granting the princely title to his brother, Pshimakho. However, Pshimakho's claim to the status of Grand Prince was rejected within Kabardia. Despite their sharp internal differences, the Talostans and Qeytuqos united for a long period in opposition to the Yidars, whose policies aimed to consolidate their own status at the expense of Kabardia's de facto independence. Yet, the Yidars had little alternative: they had to either accept the permanent loss of their domestic political influence or continue leveraging their Moscow connections as a powerful instrument against their rivals. Joint military operations by the Yidars and their Russian allies continued through 1626 and 1630. In 1631, after the death of Qudenet—the third consecutive representative of the Yidar family to hold power—Narchu Yelbezduqo received a royal charter to rule. As with his predecessor, however, his rights to the title and status of Grand Prince were not recognized in Kabardia. Consequently, a deep crisis of supreme political authority developed across the realm.

The policies of the Yidars and their Russian backers ultimately stripped the title of Grand Prince of any practical significance. Lacking domestic recognition and denied the legitimate right of seniority in the eyes of the co-ruling princes, the last Yidar Grand Princes were powerless to halt political fragmentation or the secessions of Talostaney and Jilakhstaney. Meanwhile, Qaziy Kabardia—led by cousins Alejuqo Shojenuqo and Hatokhshoqo Qaziy—emerged as the most powerful feudal domain. Its leaders openly sought hegemony over the country, and the Yidars were unable to neutralize them through foreign diplomatic backing alone. Furthermore, the Yidars' own holdings became embroiled in intense rivalries between different branches of their princely house. The heirs of Sanjalay Kanklychev (who died in 1625) were backed by the Qeytuqos, with whom they intermarried. Sholokh Sanjalay—and after his death in 1636, his brother Mutsal Sanjalay—married Alejuqo's sister in accordance with levirate custom. Conversely, the Qambolet branch, which was demographically and militarily weaker, was supported by the Talostans and Jilakhstans. Mutsal Sanjalay's allies in Kabardia aligned with the Crimean Khanate and the Lesser Nogai Horde, both of which were openly hostile to Russia.

== Prelude ==
In 1635, an attack by Aidemir-murza, the future Shamkhal of Shamkhalate of Tarki and later a key participant in the events of July 1641, resulted in the death of Kilish Sauslan, the last representative of his branch of the Yidar family. This immediately triggered a dispute over the inheritance of his feudal estate, which comprised eleven villages capable of mobilizing 250 noble horsemen and uorkis.

The primary contenders were two distinct Yidar lineages. The first faction comprised the descendants of Zhelegot, whose great-grandchildren ruled a small, Moscow-vassal principality along the lower Terek River, established under the protection of Terki—the principal Russian military outpost in the North Caucasus. This lineage was led by the brothers Budach, Sholokh, and Alejuqo Sanjalay. The second faction was the lineage of Qambolet, led by Chalimat Qudenet, the successor to Qambolet Yidar and head of the entire Qambolet patronymic.

The Sanjalay brothers possessed powerful domestic allies. Mutsal was married to the sister of Alejuqo Shojenuqo, a co-ruler of Qaziy Kabardia. As the largest fiefdom in Kabardia, Qaziy Kabardia encompassed around 50 villages and could field over a thousand armored cavalrymen alongside more than two thousand infantry. Alejuqo and his cousin, Hatokhshoqo Qaziy, maintained close political ties with the Crimean Khanate and the Lesser Nogai Horde, pursuing an independent policy free from Moscow's control. By contrast, Chalimat Qudenet was the weakest of the Yidar princes, who had seen their standing steadily erode since the early 17th century. His personal domain consisted of just four villages, capable of fielding a mere 35 uorkis.

However, Chalimat enjoyed influential patrons in Moscow alongside powerful relatives across the North Caucasus. His brother, Yakov Kudinetovich Cherkassky, and his cousin, Ivan Borisovich Cherkassky, occupied prominent positions at the Russian court. Ivan Borisovich was a maternal cousin of Marfa Nikitichna Romanova (mother of Tsar Michael Fedorovich) and remained a central figure in the Russian government until his death in 1642. Furthermore, Chalimat was the son of Babasupkh Alkhas—sister to Mudar Alkhas, the Supreme Prince of Jilakhstaney. Another nephew of Mudar Alkhas was the aforementioned Aidemir-Shamkhal, ruler of the Shamkhalate of Tarki—the largest state entity in the North Caucasus, which encompassed nearly half of the feudal holdings and mountain communities of Dagestan.

== Course ==
=== Yidarey Campaign ===
In April 1639, the allies of the Sanjalay lineage—Alejuqo Shojenuqo and Hatokhshoqo Qaziy—destroyed the possessions of Chalimat Qudenet and his ally Narchu Yelbezduqo, even capturing Chalimat's mother and two sisters. Budach and Mutsal Sanjalay were accused of treason for disobedience and secret correspondence with the Safavid government of Iran, leading to their exile from the Terek River into interior Russia. However, their younger brother, Alejuqo Sanjalay, escaped to Kabardia and assumed control over the disputed Yidarey lands. The leaders of Qaziy Kabardia appealed directly to Tsar Michael I to justify their actions. In their letter to the Tsar, they cited the right of Dmitry Mamstryukovich Cherkassky—the sole surviving direct descendant of Temruqo the Brave—to dispose of the disputed Yidarey estates in Kabardia. Furthermore, the letter issued a direct threat: if Moscow provided unconditional support to Chalimat and Yildar Qudenet, Qaziy Kabardia would defect to the Crimean Khanate. The Russian court deemed such a firm tone unacceptable; in September 1640, the Qaziy ambassador was dispatched back with a stern reply. It asserted the Russian government's overarching authority as supreme overlord and arbitrator with the final vote on all territorial disputes, while formally leveling accusations of disloyalty against the entire house of Alejuqo and Hatokhshoqo.

=== Russian Intervention ===
In the spring of 1641, Chalimat's mother and sisters were finally rescued from captivity. To accomplish this, approximately 3,000 warriors from the Big Nogai Horde were dispatched to Kabardia under the command of Prince Dmitry Gochakov, who successfully secured their release without provoking a large-scale engagement. However, freeing the captive women and transferring Chalimat's subjects to Talostaney failed to resolve the core political dispute.

=== Yidarey–Jilakhstaney Campaign and Assassinations ===
The feud over the inheritance and the refusal to recognize the Tsarist government's ruling in favor of Chalimat escalated to the point that the anti-Russian faction turned to hired assassins. As Babasupkh Alkhas reported in her account:

"...Prince Sunchaleev's wife of Prince Zhelegosh with her children, with Oleguk-murza Sunchaleev, their nephew, the Kafyr-Kumytsky [Kazi-Kumukhsky] Chuchelov-murza, and sent them to Kazyevo Kabarda to Aleguk and Khotogzhuk, and ordered, sovereign, to buy thieves' people for my son Kelmametek, in order to destroy him. And according to her plan, sovereign, Aleguk and Khotgzhuk and her son Aleguk with that Chuchelov-murza bought the Tatar Chinkireik from Maly Nogai and sent him to our Kabarda and ordered to kill my son Kelmametek."

In May 1641, Princes Alejuqo and Hatokhshoqo launched a direct assault on Mudar Alkhas's holdings. Although Chalimat escaped because he was away from his estates, his uncle Mudar Alkhas was assassinated in mid-May 1641. Shortly thereafter, on May 29, 1641, the leaders of Qaziy Kabardia and their Lesser Nogai allies invaded the lands of Chalimat and his ally Narchu. The Yidars suffered approximately 30 casualties among their noblemen and uorks, while the Qaziy forces captured over 270 prisoners and seized extensive herds of horses and livestock.

=== Battle of Malka ===
==== Mobilization ====
These events pushed the conflict into its final phase. A funeral feast—a traditional lament for Mudar Alkhas—brought together Chalimat Qudenet's relatives and allies, initiating a broad mobilization. The Big Nogai murzas, Saltanash Aksakov and Khoroshai Chubarmametev, were recruited for the upcoming campaign against Qaziy Kabardia and the Lesser Nogai Horde. Notably, as early as May 1640, the leaders of Qaziy Kabardia had attempted to diplomatically align with the Big Nogai Horde. Astrakhan voivodes recorded the arrival of a Kabardian embassy led by Hatokhshoqo Qaziy at the encampment ulus of Saltanash Aksakov, where a preliminary pact was drawn up:

"And they, the Kabardian murzas, signed an agreement with the Kabardian Circassians, and that he, Saltanash, with his brothers and his ulus people would protect them from the military Astrakhan soldiers and from the Azov Cossacks, and that they, the Kabardian Circassians, would stand together in solidarity, and that he, Saltanash, would roam with his uluses near Kabarda. And Saltanash-murza believed with them with all his soul."

Despite this earlier agreement, by the summer of 1641 Saltanash Aksakov answered Chalimat Qudenet's call to arms. The combined coalition forces mobilized by Chalimat and Aidemir-Shamkhal were estimated at 5,200 men by the Astrakhan voivode N. I. Odoevsky. Of these, 1,200 were provided by Nogai murzas Saltanash Aksakov and Khoroshai Chubarmametev, while the core consisted of 3,500 Circassian and Dagestani warriors. Based on contemporary mobilization data, historian Z. A. Kozhev estimates the coalition's core at 1,100 Circassians (including 300 from Jilakhstaney), 50 Bragun Kumyks, and 2,350 troops from the Shamkhalate of Tarki.

To reinforce this force, Chalimat Qudenet added a contingent of Russian service troops stationed at Terki to guard his lands. In his September 12, 1641 report to the Tsarist government, Terek voivode S. I. Shakhovsky estimated the Russian contingent at roughly 300 men: 100 mounted Streltsy, 18 boyar children, and 193 Okochan (Chechens) and local North Caucasian converts. However, N. I. Odoevsky reported a larger figure:

"...There were your sovereign's Terek military men, the head of the Strelets Ortemiy Shishmarev with the order and the Terek boyar children and the Terek and Greben Cossacks, about 500 people or more."

The Terek voivode likely understated the Russian troop count, omitting the participation of a significant detachment of Greben and Terek Cossasses consisting of at least 200 men.

On the opposing side, the combined army of Qaziy Kabardia and the Lesser Nogai Horde numbered slightly over 2,000 men, approximately three-fifths of whom were Circassians. The heavy armored cavalry of Alejuqo Shojenuqo, Hatokhshoqo Qaziy, and Alejuqo Sanjalay formed the strike force. This included over 1,000 horsemen from Qaziy Kabardia, 250 from the disputed Yidarey estates, and a detachment of service nobles belonging to Mutsal Sanjalay. Kozhev estimates "Mutsal's uzdens" at 90–100 men, bringing the total Circassian armored cavalry under Alejuqo and Hatokhshoqo to roughly 1,350 horsemen. The remaining shock cavalry consisted of about 800–900 Nogai warriors led by Soltan-murza Kasayev of the Lesser Nogai Horde.

==== Preparations ====
Although contemporary documents do not explicitly outline the coalition's march to the Malka River, Kozhev presents two potential routes. The first involved marching from Jilakhstaney across central Kabardia, fording swollen glacial rivers such as the Cherek and Baksan under constant threat of enemy ambushes—a scenario deemed unlikely. The more practical route involved assembling forces at the Sunzha River, crossing the Terek River above the Mozdok tract, and advancing westward toward Qaziy Kabardia's heartland in Pyatigorye. This route offered a safe river crossing far from enemy lines, while the high southern bank of the Malka River protected their left flank from surprise attacks. Given that the initial clashes occurred near the Lesser Nogai encampments in the mountains, the coalition almost certainly chose this second route along the left bank of the Malka, where the foothills transition into alpine pastures:

"And how, sovereign, they came to Kabarda, and at the same time the Kaziyev murzas Soltan-murza prince Kasayev son of Islamov with his brothers and with his ulus people were roaming near Kabarda in the It-Almas tract, and Kelmamet-murza de Murza Kudinetovich sent military Russian people and Cherkass to the pen in the It-Almas tract... and Kelmamet-murza himself with the rest of the military people remained behind. And your, the sovereign's military men captured many of the Kaziyev uluses and drove away horse and livestock herds."

==== The Battle ====
The battle took place on July 12, 1641, along the banks of the Malka River. Facing numerical inferiority against the combined Yidar, Russian, Nogai, Kumyk, and Okochan forces, Prince Alejuqo Shojenuqo employed a feigned retreat tactic. He concealed his main force—the elite, heavily armored Kabardian cavalry—in an ambush within a mountain gorge, positioning his Lesser Nogai allies in the foreground. The Nogais were instructed to engage the enemy and then feign a retreat, drawing the coalition army into a position that would expose their flank and rear to the hidden cavalry.

In the initial stage of the engagement, the two main armies did not immediately collide head-on. Because July was the peak month for driving livestock to alpine pastures, Chalimat's forces focused on striking the enemy's most vulnerable economic targets. The sprawling herds of horses and cattle being moved to higher ground proved difficult to protect. The vanguard led by Aidemir-Shamkhal quickly overran the Lesser Nogai outposts and became disorganized while seizing livestock. Unable to withstand the initial push, the Nogai vanguard staged a rapid retreat, drawing the coalition deeper into the terrain.

Distracted by plunder and assuming a swift victory, Aidemir-Shamkhal's forces lost formation, causing the coalition army to split into three dispersed groups. At that critical moment, Alejuqo's hidden armored cavalry emerged from the gorge in three heavy columns, striking the coalition's rear. Wedging into the gaps between the three separated enemy groups, the Kabardian cavalry enveloped and encircled the coalition army. The engagement turned into a complete rout, with Alejuqo's forces pursuing the surviving coalition troops until they were completely destroyed.

== Aftermath ==
=== Casualties ===
In a desperate attempt to break through the encirclement, horsemen and foot soldiers leaped from a cliff into the Balk River, where nearly all were killed or drowned. Virtually all the primary commanders of the coalition forces perished in the battle, including Chalimat Cherkassky, Aydemir-Shamkhal, Yeldar Aybak, and the Strelets commander Artemy Shishmarev. Several hundred coalition troops were captured by the Kabardians, among whom were the princes Tatarkhan Aslan and Akhle Aytech, as well as Kudenet Bragunsky.

According to the report of the Terek voivode, out of more than 300 servicemen deployed from the Terek garrison, only 22 returned home. This total does not account for the additional 200 Cossacks reported by N. I. Odoevsky.

Only a fraction of the coalition leadership managed to escape the battlefield: two brothers of Aydemir-Shamkhal (Kazanali and Mamudaley), Princes Chalimat Yibaq, Qaziy Mudar, and Narshau with his son, as well as Prince Tonjekhan Aslan and the Big Nogai leaders Saltanash-murza Aksakov and Khoroshai Chubarmametev.

The Kumyks also suffered heavy casualties among their nobility, losing Aydemir's son Elmurza as well as the Karabudakhkent princes Savtai-murza and Giray-murza.

=== Reports of the battle ===
One of the participants in the events, Kasai-murza Kaziyev (son of Bayterekov), described the engagement on the Malka as a single-day battle. Conversely, Saltanash Aksakov—the leader of the Big Nogai Horde who fought in the engagement—depicted a battle that extended over two days:

"And they came, sovereign, to the Balkh River, and from that tract of It-Almas to the Kaziyev uluses, and many of the Kaziyev uluses they captured and killed. And Kelmamet de Kudenetovich and all the murzas and the head of the strelets on the Balkh River remained with a small force. And the Kazyevskys, Soltan-murza and his brothers, fled to Kabarda to Aleguk-murza and Otogozhuk-murza, who were supposedly in assembly at the time. And on the second day, sovereign, Aleguk and Atagozhuk from Cherkasy and Kaziyevskaya Soltan-murza with his brothers and with his ulus people came upon Kelmamet undetected."

In the petition of Chalimat's mother, Babasupkh Alkas, the battle on the Malka is likewise divided into two distinct stages, though condensed into a single day. Furthermore, she detailed an episode involving enemy espionage, attributing the intelligence operation to the mother of the Sanjalay brothers:

"And when, sovereign, my son went with the military men, Princess Zhelegosha sent her uzden Inaluchka Malenkov into the same army and ordered him, sovereign, to find an opportune moment for the murzas Aleguk, Khotogzhuk, and Aleguk-murza Sunchaleev to strike. And Inaluchka Malenkov, having seen how the sovereign’s military men had defeated Malaya Nogai and dispersed toward the encampments, rode off, sovereign, to the murzas Oleguk, Khotogzhuk, and Prince Oleguk-murza Sunchaleev, alerting them that all the military men were scattered on the move. And then, my lord, their men—Aleguk and Khotogzhuk Kaziyev and Aleguk-murza Sunchaleyev's son—with their warriors came against my son and your sovereign's warriors and defeated them, destroying me, your servant, to the point of extinction."

The report of S. I. Shakhovsky provides a vivid description of the battle's final phase along the Malka River:

"...They were torn apart, forbidden from regrouping, and pressed against a steep, deep ravine in the mountains along the Balk River. Many of the sovereign's soldiers, as well as Kumyk and Circassian troops, fell on horseback and on foot from that steep ravine into the Balk, perishing from the great height."

=== Immedite aftermath ===
Without a doubt, had Alejuqo been defeated, Kabardia would have been devastated by foreign invaders, and the Dagestani rulers would have assumed hegemonic power in the North Caucasus. The devastated Kabardian lands would have become easy prey for constant raids, which would have set back the nation's development for many years. Alejuqo Shojenuqo's military leadership and his ability to rally the people to defend their homeland played a significant role in the Kabardian victory. The Battle of Malka in 1641 is one of the major milestones in Kabardian history.

The news of the defeat of the pro-Russian forces shocked the governors of Astrakhan and the city of Terek. For a long time, they hesitated to report the defeat to the tsar. After some time, word reached Kabardia that a large army was gathering in Astrakhan to support the Terek governors. The Russians demanded an immediate confession, the release of prisoners, and recognition of the Russian Tsar's authority. Failure to comply threatened the execution of the Kabardian hostages in Terek and the burning of Kabardia itself. Shojenuqo refused to admit his guilt or release the prisoners without ransom. Well aware of the imbalance of power between Russia and Kabardia, and seeking to avoid a devastating Russian invasion, Alejuqo and Hatokhshoqo made the difficult decision to resettle their people beyond the Kuban, where they enjoyed relative safety and could quickly receive aid from Western Circassia and Lesser Nogai in the event of Russian aggression. Moreover, these lands fell within the Crimean Khanate's sphere of influence, and any presence of Russian troops there would have raised concerns in Bakhchisarai and Istanbul. At the end of 1641, Qazy's Kabardia overran the Kuban region.

Having forced the Kabardians to resettle, the Russian government quickly realized its mistake. The vast lands abandoned by the Kabardians began to attract the attention of the numerous and highly warlike Kalmyks, a people who had recently arrived in the Volga region and the North Caucasus. If these lands were seized by the Kalmyks, who at that time were experiencing difficult relations with Russia, the city of Terek would be isolated from Russia, posing a real threat to Russian influence in the Caucasus. Less than a year later, Russia began seeking ways to normalize relations with Alejuqo. However, initial requests and attempts to persuade the Kabardians to return to their former homes were unsuccessful. Alejuqo had every reason to distrust the Terek governors. The Moscow government then recalled Alejuqo's son-in-law, Mutsal Cherkassky, who had been exiled to Siberia. He was urgently brought to Moscow, all charges were dropped, and all positions and powers in the Terek city were restored to him. At a reception in the Kremlin on August 20, 1642, the tsar personally instructed him to return Kabardia from the Kuban region to Beshtaugorye.

Russian–Kabardian relations were discussed. As soon as the harvest was gathered, the Kabardians pledged to resettle back to their original locations. The Russian side pledged not only to avoid any obstacles but also to warn Alejuqo's enemies from Lesser Kabardia and Dagestan not to attack the settlers. The issues of joint defense against the Crimean Khan, the replacement of hostages, and the swearing-in of all Kabardian, Abaza, Lesser Nogai, and other princes and uzdens subordinate to Shojenuqo were discussed. All Russian embassies, delegations, and merchant convoys passing through Kabardia received guarantees of immunity. Alejuqo promised to release all Russians captured in the Battle of Malkino and not yet ransomed by their relatives for a small ransom.

After the negotiations concluded, Alejuqo took an oath of allegiance to Russia on the Koran in his own name, in the name of Khatazhuko, and in the name of all the Kabardian, Abaza, Nogai, and other murzas and uzdens aligned with him.

Alejuqo was assigned the largest salary in the Caucasus, and he and his retinue were presented with lavish gifts. On May 22, the Kabardian delegation left Terki.
