= Qanshau Jilakhstan =

Co-ruler of Jilakhstaney
- Reign: 1550s
- Predecessor: Jilakhstan of Kabardia
- Successor: Alkhas Jamirza
- Full name: Qanshau, son of Jilakhstan; Kabardian: Джылэхъстан и къуэ Къанщау
- Born: Unknown; Kabardia
- Died: December/January 1552; Chegem river
- Noble family: Inalid dynasty; House of Jilakhstan
- Issue: Seperuqo; Aytech
- Father: Jilakhstan Minbolet

Qanshau Jilakhstan (Note: Kabardian: Джылэхъстан Къанщау) (Note: Also called Qanshoqo or Qanshaua in songs) was a Kabardian prince of the Jilakhstaney princely house who lived during the mid-16th century. He is chiefly remembered for opposing Grand Prince Temruqo Yidar, allying with the Kumyks and the Avar Utsmi against Kabardia, and being killed at the Battle of Kishzhibek around 1552.

== Biography ==
Jilakhstan had 4 sons, Jamirza, Laversan, Tagata, and Qanshau. By contrast, The Arabic manuscript al-'Uqūd al-Jawhariyya fī al-Mahāsin al-Dawla al-Ashrafiyya al-Ghawiyya identifies another son, Mirza, who succeeded Jilakhstan as ruler of Kabardia following his father's death.

According to the ethnographer K. F. Stal, all Jilakhstaney princes trace their origins to Prince Jilakhstan, who reportedly fled from the Kuban region as a result of a blood feud. Together with his aul, he migrated across Kabardia and Chechnya and eventually reached the Yarmansu River in Kumyk territory, where he later died. His sons, Jamirza and Qanshau, subsequently returned westward along the Sunzha River to the Kinbla River and, after crossing the Kabardian Range, settled on the Psedakh River. Stal states that the Akhle family descended from Qanshau, while the Mudar family descended from Jamirza. Having established themselves on the Psedakh River, Qanshau and Jamirza occupied previously unclaimed land, and the population living under them paid yasak (tributary) to Kabardian princes in accordance with Kabardian custom.

Little is known about Qanshau from either archival sources or Kabardian oral tradition. Most surviving accounts are derived from the writings of Shora Nogmov and two versions of the historical song Chegema of the Old Ditch. In these sources, his name appears in the forms Qanshoqo and Qanshaua. According to Nogmov, Qanshau broke with his elder brothers and, fearing retaliation, left Kabardia.

=== Qanshau's departure from Kabardia ===
Upon becoming Grand Prince of Kabardia in the 1550s, Temruqo Yidar faced opposition from several Kabardian princes who sought the position of Grand Prince of Kabardia for themselves. Among them was the Kabardian prince Qanshau Jilakhstan, son of Jilakhstan, who, after leaving Kabardia, allied with the Kumyks and reportedly raided Kabardian territory multiple times each year. According to some accounts, during the summer these forces attacked hayfields and disrupted the harvest of millet—the principal agricultural crop of the Kabardians—forcing much of the population, except those mobilized for militia service, to seek refuge in the Kistin Gorge. These actions are said to have been motivated by the seizure of Qanshau's lands by the families of Bitu and Maremshao Yidar.

=== Battle of Kishzhibek and death ===
During this period, Qanshau also persuaded the Avar Utsmi—identified in the sources as Khadan Utsmi—to invade Kabardia, whose population was reportedly weakened by internal strife. Khadan accepted and called upon his allies, including the Nogais and the Kumyks, assembling a united force against the Kabardians. In response, the Kabardians called upon their Trans-Kuban allies, the Abazins under Lev Achba and the Besleneys under Yelzheruqo Qanoqo.

Supreme command of the allied Kabardian forces was entrusted to Prince Yelzheruqo. As the Avar Utsmi crossed the Terek River, Prince Yelzheruqo and his advance guard met the invading force and attempted negotiations. After negotiations failed, Yelzheruqo withdrew to prepared defensive positions. Two days later, the Utsmi advanced toward the trenches, and Yelzheruqo engaged the enemy. A fierce battle followed, reportedly lasting two days. According to a legend preserved by the Wartan family, this battle marked the Kabardians' first encounter with firearms. During the fighting, Kabardian forces reportedly heard a thunderous roar and observed smoke rising near Chegem. A volunteer named Wartan was said to have crossed the Chegem River at night and captured a matchlock from Dagestani troops. For this act, he was allegedly elevated to the rank of wark (noble).

On the third day, hostilities resumed. During the renewed fighting, the Utsmi was killed, causing confusion among his forces. According to the legend, the Kabardians exploited this disorder, launched a coordinated assault, and drove the opposing army toward the Terek River. It is claimed that only one-third of the invading force managed to escape. In the course of the battle, Prince Qanshau, described as one of the instigators of the campaign, was also killed. The battle thereafter became known as Kishzhibek, a name interpreted as meaning "salvation lies not in stone walls, but in the courage of men." The battle is commemorated in the following traditional song:

We keep our old scythes for the summer mowing, Our ripe yellow millet was trampled by wild boars, May barley ears swell into blisters in the bellies of the Besleney witches!

Our fattened horses return to the courtyards with bare saddles (without riders), Our beautiful youth [women] die in comfortable chairs.

Prince Qanshoqo leads an army against us three times in a single year, The Kisti road wears out our light shoes (chuvalki), Our metal old cauldrons break on the single trail of the gorge.

When two large armies stand against each other, Our princes look at Kishbek with favor:

"Their queen bee left them long ago," they say,

And Utsmiy begins to destroy, breaking them down. Both Kabardians shoot together from the same trench, A bridge made of corpses was built from Utsmiy’s army, And the blood running out from under it is like rainwater.

There is also a second version of the song, Like the first version, it recounts his alliance with the Utsmi and the invasion of Kabardia, but places greater emphasis on the suffering of the Kabardian population and condemns Qanshau for siding with foreign forces against his homeland.

We met the army of Prince Kanshao three times in one year, We were left without bread—the enemies ruined our crops, Our light shoes wore out on the mountain Kistin road, Our iron cauldrons bent along the narrow gorge trail.

The enemy plows our village land—the thief of our millet. "It is too early for me to ride out," he says, "In a doglike manner, he forces me to honor him." "What else should I do for him?" he asks, "I make my chief messenger ride to him swiftly."

On that Chegem ditch—on the fortress of Mukhost—we rely. When the two armies face each other, the princesses send word about themselves in despair. "Oh, both Kabardians, you rushed forth from a single ditch!" "And what if I send my son back home from you?" he says, Threatening with an old whip, Baruqo Wumakho.

When the two armies set in motion, Old Wumakho's horn [drinking cup] was shattered before him. And Martaza was not allowed to return back here!

Aside from the introduction of the figures Baruqo and his son Murtaza, the two surviving versions of the song are largely consistent in their narrative. Both describe the same campaign against Kabardia by Qanshau and the Utsmi, the evacuation of civilians into the mountain gorges, and the hardships endured by those seeking refuge, symbolized by the worn footwear and damaged iron cauldrons mentioned in the verses.

Although Circassian folklore does not provide a specific date for the battle, epigraphic evidence offers a chronological indication. In the cemetery of the Shamkhal clan in Gazi-Kumukh, a tombstone inscription commemorating Muhammad, son of Amal-Muhammad—described as "killed in battle with the infidel Circassians"—has been preserved and is dated to the month of Muharram 960 AH (27 December 1552 – 24 January 1553). A similar date appears in the epitaph of another individual from the village of Richa. Based on these inscriptions, the battle is generally dated to approximately 1552.
