= Circassian raids into Georgia (1587-1604) =

Circassian–Georgian War of 1587–1604
- Part of Circassian–Georgian wars
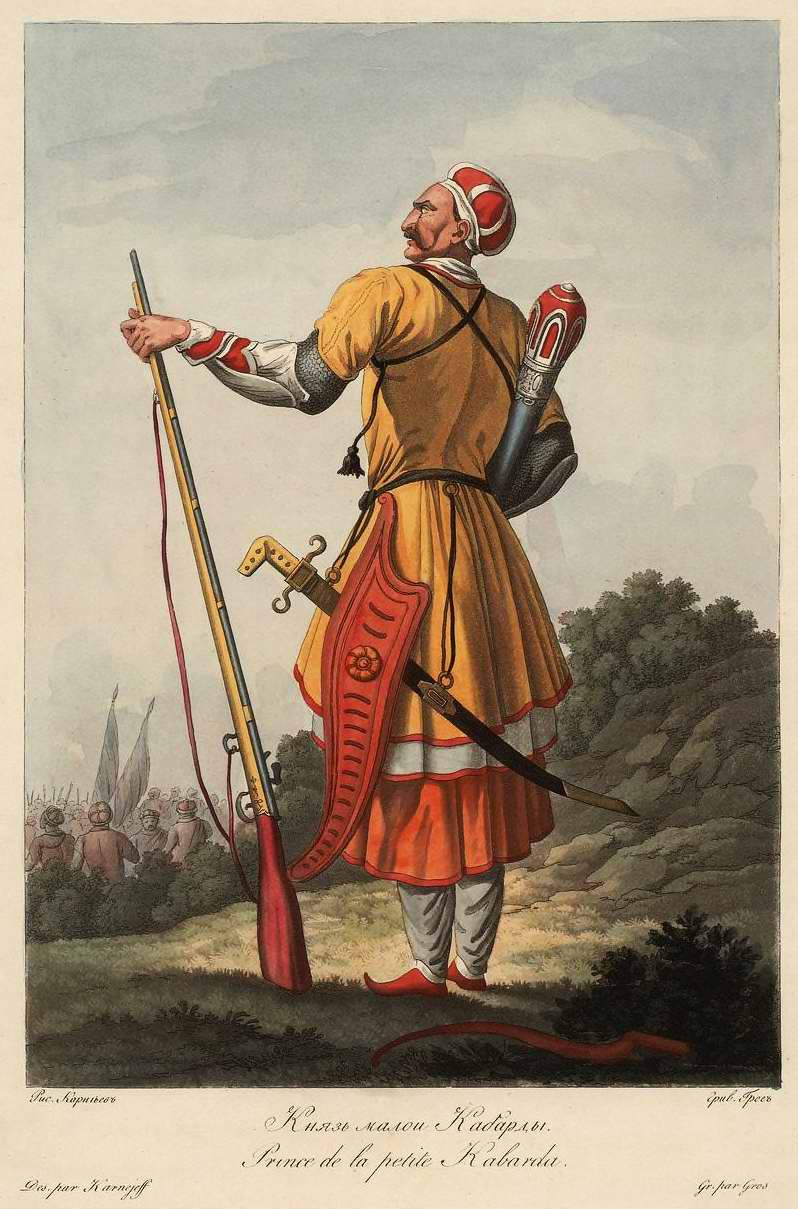
- A prince from Lesser Kabardia
Date	1587–1604
Location	Daryal Gorge, Vainakhia, Kingdom of Kartli, Svaneti
Result	Circassian victory
Territorial changes	Kabardians assert dominance over the Darial Gorge; Duchy of Ksani pays tribute to Princedom of Kabardia; Devastation of the territories of Kakheti, Kartli, and Svaneti.

Belligerents
Kabardia; Talostaney; Jilakhstaney	Kingdom of Kakheti; Duchy of Aragvi; Duchy of Ksani; Ingushes of Darial Gorge (1596–1597)

Commanders and leaders
Sholokh Tepsaruqo; Yibaq Tepsaruqo; Aytech Qanshau; Mudar Alkhas	Nugzar of Aragvi (Note: Referred to in the reports as "Prince Aristov" or "Aristop") (Kingdom of Kakheti) Alexander II; Sultan Larsinsky

Strength
Unknown	Unknown

Casualties and losses
Unknown	Heavy losses: Many killed and captured

The Circassian raids into Georgia (1587-1604) refers to a series of raids and attacks conducted by Circassian peoples against Georgian and Nakh territories, primarily through the Darial Gorge into regions such as Sioni, Kakheti and Kartli.

== Campaigns ==
Mudar Alkhas, a Kabardian noble of the Jilakhstan lineage, emerged as a prominent figure in Lesser Kabardia after the expulsion of the Qeytuqo princes by Temruqo Idar, he established control over the strategical passage of Darial Gorge in the Central Caucasus.

From 1587 to 1604, Prince Mudar and other Kabardian princes were engaged in conflicts with the Georgian eristavis of the land of Sioni. His forces, alongside allied murzas such as Aytech and Yibaq Tepsaruqo, conducted repeated raids into the Son territory, resulting in the capture of prisoners and livestock and the devastation of local settlements.

Mudar maintained fortified positions ("kabaks") at the entrance to the Darial Gorge, allowing him to exert military control through the pass. According to reports by Russian envoys in 1587, Mudar collected tribute from the "Son land", including from the Georgian ruler Nugzar I of Aragvi, identified as Prince Aristov in sources.

The Russian envoys in 1589 report and attack from the Circassians against the Georgians into the Sioni region. The report suggests a raid conducted by the brother of Sholokh Tepsaruqo, Yibaq Tepsaruqo. Yibaq, according to the report, attacked the Georgian settlements in the Sioni region and captured the village of Kado owned by Alexander II of Kakheti, ravaging the region and taking a total of 40 captives from the village. the report tells as follows;

"... And the elder Kiril also told us, your servants, that previously, the Circassians had raided the Sonsk land; that Sholokh's brother Ibak Murza came with the Circassians, and ravaged Tsar Alexander's (Alexander II of Kakheti) village of "Kado", taking captive wives and children, 40 people in total"

In 1596, Kabardian forces led by Princes Sholokh and Aytech-Murza advanced through the Daryal Gorge and launched raids into the territories of the Vainakh tribes. They captured several fortified settlements belonging to the noble Sultan-Murza, establishing control over strategic highland positions. After consolidating their hold in the gorge, the Kabardians pushed further south into the mountainous frontier regions of Kartli, targeting districts such as Sioni and Ksani. The campaign involved raids, killings, and the capture of prisoners, reflecting a strategy aimed at both territorial disruption and resource acquisition.

By 1597, the scale of the attacks prompted King Alexander II of Kakheti to report the situation to Russian envoys. He described how Sholokh and Aytech-Murza had invaded the Sioni region, inflicting significant losses and taking numerous captives.

Alexander referred to Sholokh with the title "gosudar," indicating either recognition of his authority or a diplomatic phrasing for the Russian audience. At the same time, another Kabardian noble, Mudar Alkhas, acted independently by warning Alexander of the raids and releasing some captives. This split in Kabardian leadership contributed to tensions within the invading forces. In response, Sholokh appealed to Russian commanders in Terek to act against Mudar, but Alexander intervened diplomatically, urging them not to take action. He emphasized that any offenses would be resolved and highlighted Alkas's loyalty to the Russian Tsar.

In 1604, The unrest in the Eastern Georgian lands, especially around the region of the Duchy of Ksani rose, as rivalry between Nugzar I and Alexander II grew more intense. The Russian Tsar expressed his concern in a letter, stating:

"For centuries, the Sonsky land, under the rule of the Iberian kings, was one land, and the people were of one Christian faith; but not long ago, you, Prince Aristov, (Nugzar) wanted to separate from Tsar Alexander, and for that, hostility and enmity arose between you."

In 1604, Mudar Alkhas again led large scaled raids into the territories of Sonsky, owned by Prince Nugzar that devastated the region, Mudar Alkhas expressed his relations with Nugzar in a letter to ambassador Birkin. He declared to Birkin that he could not escort his embassy to Georgia as follows:

"I will send... you to be escorted to the Sonian (Ksani) lands; but I cannot escort you further than the Sonian lands, because now Aristov (Nugzar) of Son is not in the world with me."

== Aftermath ==
By 1604, Kabardian influence had expanded to the vicinity of the Daryal Gorge, a key passage connecting the North Caucasus with the Kingdom of Kartli. Prince Aytech Qanshau secured control over an alternative mountain route leading to the "land of Soni"—a designation referring to the domain of the Duchy of Ksani.

Kabardian feudal lords conducted raids into Georgian territory, attacking the lands of the Ksani eristavi, capturing inhabitants, and asserting intermittent military pressure on border regions.
