= Aytech Qanshau =

Ruler of Darial Gorge
- Predecessor: Qanshau Jilakhstan
- Successor: Akhle Aytech
- Born: 16th century Kabardia
- Died: Unknown (Note: First half of the 16th century); Kabardia
- Issue: Sons: Akhle; Chalimat (Note: Also referred to as "Mamat"); Aydemir; Daughters: Jelaguashe
Names
- Aytech, son of Qanshau
- Kabardian: Къанщау и къуэ Айтэч
- House: Inalid dynasty; House of Jilakhstan
- Father: Qanshau Jilakhstan
- Religion: Sunni Islam

Aytech Qanshau (Note: Kabardian: Къанщау Айтэч) was a Kabardian prince active during the late 16th and early 17th centuries. A member of the House of Jilakhstan and the son of Qanshau Jilakhstan, he was among the leading Kabardian nobles involved in military campaigns across the Central Caucasus. Alongside princes such as Mudar Alkhas and Sholokh Tepsaruqo, he participated in repeated raids against the Georgian regions of Sioni and Ksani, as well as campaigns through the Darial Gorge. He ruled a domain centered on the strategical Darial Pass, controlling an important mountain route into the Georgian lands. In 1614–1615, Aytech was among the Kabardian leaders who reaffirmed their allegiance to Tsar Michael I of Russia, and he is last mentioned in historical records in 1615.

== Biography ==
=== Family ===
Little is recorded about Aytech, the son of Qanshau Jilakhstan, in surviving historical sources. Genealogical records compiled by A. M. Pushkin state that Tabuldu's third son, Minbolet, had a son named Jilakhstan, whose son was Qanshau Jilakhstan.

Qanshau's son, Aytech, is recorded as having three sons: Chalimat, (Note: Also referred to as "Mamat") who reportedly died by natural causes, Akhle, and Aydemir. A similar genealogical succession is given in the genealogy compiled by A. I. Lobanov-Rostovsky. Both genealogies place Qanshau Jilakhstan, in the third generation after Tabuldu, Aytech in the fourth, and Chalimat in the fifth.

=== Wars with Georgians ===
From 1587 to 1604, Prince Mudar and other Kabardian princes were engaged in conflicts with the Georgian eristavis of the land of Sioni. His forces, alongside allied murzas such as Aytech and Ivak Tepsaruqo, conducted repeated raids into the Son territory, resulting in the capture of prisoners and livestock and the devastation of local settlements.

Mudar maintained fortified positions ("kabaks") at the entrance to the Darial Gorge, allowing him to exert military control through the pass. According to reports by Russian envoys in 1587, Mudar collected tribute from the "Son land", including from the Georgian ruler Nugzar I of Aragvi, identified as Prince Aristov in sources.

The Russian envoys in 1589 report and attack from the Circassians against the Georgians into the Sioni region. The report suggests a raid conducted by the brother of Sholokh Tepsaruqo, Yibaq Tepsaruqo. Yibaq, according to the report, attacked the Georgian settlements in the Sioni region and captured the village of Kado owned by Alexander II of Kakheti, ravaging the region and taking a total of 40 captives from the village. the report tells as follows;

"... And the elder Kiril also told us, your servants, that previously, the Circassians had raided the Sonsk land; that Sholokh's brother Ibak Murza came with the Circassians, and ravaged Tsar Alexander's (Alexander II of Kakheti) village of "Kado", taking captive wives and children, 40 people in total"

In 1596, Kabardian forces led by Princes Sholokh and Aytech-Murza advanced through the Daryal Gorge and launched raids into the territories of the Vainakh tribes. They captured several fortified settlements belonging to the noble Sultan-Murza, establishing control over strategic highland positions. After consolidating their hold in the gorge, the Kabardians pushed further south into the mountainous frontier regions of Kartli, targeting districts such as Sioni and Ksani. The campaign involved raids, killings, and the capture of prisoners, reflecting a strategy aimed at both territorial disruption and resource acquisition.

By 1597, the scale of the attacks prompted King Alexander II of Kakheti to report the situation to Russian envoys. He described how Sholokh and Aytech-Murza had invaded the Sioni region, inflicting significant losses and taking numerous captives.

Alexander referred to Sholokh with the title "gosudar," indicating either recognition of his authority or a diplomatic phrasing for the Russian audience. At the same time, another Kabardian noble, Mudar Alkhas, acted independently by warning Alexander of the raids and releasing some captives. This split in Kabardian leadership contributed to tensions within the invading forces. In response, Sholokh appealed to Russian commanders in Terek to act against Mudar, but Alexander intervened diplomatically, urging them not to take action. He emphasized that any offenses would be resolved and highlighted Alkas's loyalty to the Russian Tsar.

In 1604, The unrest in the Eastern Georgian lands, especially around the region of the Duchy of Ksani rose, as rivalry between Nugzar I and Alexander II grew more intense. The Russian Tsar expressed his concern in a letter, stating:

"For centuries, the Sonsky land, under the rule of the Iberian kings, was one land, and the people were of one Christian faith; but not long ago, you, Prince Aristov, (Nugzar) wanted to separate from Tsar Alexander, and for that, hostility and enmity arose between you."

In 1604, Mudar Alkhas again led large scaled raids into the territories of Sonsky, owned by Prince Nugzar that devastated the region, Mudar Alkhas expressed his relations with Nugzar in a letter to ambassador Birkin. He declared to Birkin that he could not escort his embassy to Georgia as follows:

"I will send... you to be escorted to the Sonian (Ksani) lands; but I cannot escort you further than the Sonian lands, because now Aristov (Nugzar) of Son is not in the world with me."

By 1604, Kabardian influence had expanded to the vicinity of the Daryal Gorge, a key passage connecting the North Caucasus with the Kingdom of Kartli. Prince Aytech Qanshau secured control over an alternative mountain route leading to the "land of Soni"—a designation referring to the domain of the Duchy of Ksani.

=== Later life ===
Aytech is mentioned in a report sent by the Terek voivode P. P. Golovin to the Ambassadorial Prikaz in late 1614 or early 1615 concerning the acceptance of the shert to the Russian Tsar by the Kabardian princes Sholokh Tepsaruqo, Qaziy Pshiapshoqo, and Aytech Qanshau. The same document also records the departure of Mudar Alkhas to the court of the Safavid Shah.

According to Golovin's report, the Terek serviceman Mosey Piminov delivered a letter urging Sholokh, Qaziy, and Aytech to remain loyal to Tsar Michael I and not abandon the Russian alliance. After hearing the letter, the three leaders reportedly declared that they and all of their uzdens would remain "forever inseparable" from Tsar Michael Fyodorovich and under his authority.

However, Mudar Alkhas rejected this position and, having secured the favor of Shah Abbas I, reportedly prepared to start a civil war in Kabardia with Persian support. The planned campaign ultimately did not take place.

Aytech is last mentioned in 1615 and no other reliable historical references to him have been identified.
