= Akhle Aytech =

Prince of Akhle Kabardia
- Reign: fl. 1641 – 1661
- Predecessor: Aytech Qanshau
- Successor: Minbolet Akhle
- Born: Unknown; Kabardia
- Died: 1661; Kabardia
- Issue: Sons: Minbolet; Sholokh
Names
- Akhle, son of Aytech
- Kabardian: Айтэч и къуэ Ахлъэ
- House: Inalid dynasty; House of Jilakhstan; House of Akhle (founder)
- Father: Aytech Qanshau
- Religion: Sunni Islam

Akhle Aytech (Note: Kabardian: Айтэч Ахлъэ) was a Kabardian prince and founder of the House of Akhle, a branch of the Jilakhstaney dynasty. His domain was known as Akhle Kabardia (or Akhley) in contemporary Russian records. He was the son of Aytech Qanshau and great-grandson of Jilakhstan of Kabardia, founder of the Jilakhstaney family. He was active in Kabardian political affairs and maintained relations with the Russian authorities during the 1640s.

== Biography ==
=== Early life ===
Akhle Aytech, According to genealogical traditions concerning the Kabardian princely families, was a son of Aytech Qanshau, and the Grand-grandson of Jilakhstan of Kabardia, who was the founder of Jilakhstaney. Akhle is the founder of Akhle princely family.

In 1641, Akhle was involved in a petition submitted by Prince Nartshu Yelbezduq and his relatives to the Terek Prikaznaya Izba. The petition, dated 31 May, requested Russian protection against incursions from Qaziy Kabardia, particularly those led by Aleguko Shangelievich Cherkassky. Among those who joined the petition were Akhle Aytech and Chalimat Qudenet.

=== Assassination of Mudar ===
The feud over the inheritance and the refusal to recognize the Tsarist government's ruling in favor of Chalimat escalated to the point that the anti-Russian faction turned to hired assassins. As Babasupkh Alkhas reported in her account:

"...Prince Sunchaleev's wife of Prince Zhelegosh with her children, with Oleguk-murza Sunchaleev, their nephew, the Kafyr-Kumytsky [Kazi-Kumukhsky] Chuchelov-murza, and sent them to Kazyevo Kabarda to Aleguk and Khotogzhuk, and ordered, sovereign, to buy thieves' people for my son Kelmametek, in order to destroy him. And according to her plan, sovereign, Aleguk and Khotgzhuk and her son Aleguk with that Chuchelov-murza bought the Tatar Chinkireik from Maly Nogai and sent him to our Kabarda and ordered to kill my son Kelmametek."

In May 1641, Princes Alejuqo and Hatokhshoqo launched a direct assault on Mudar Alkhas's holdings. Although Chalimat escaped because he was away from his estates, his uncle Mudar Alkhas was assassinated in mid-May 1641. Shortly thereafter, on May 29, 1641, the leaders of Qaziy Kabardia and their Lesser Nogai allies invaded the lands of Chalimat and his ally Nartshu. The Yidars suffered approximately 30 casualties among their noblemen and uorks, while the Qaziy forces captured over 270 prisoners and seized extensive herds of horses and livestock.

=== Battle of Malka ===
==== Mobilization ====
These events pushed the conflict into its final phase. A funeral feast—a traditional lament for Mudar Alkhas—brought together Chalimat Qudenet's relatives and allies, initiating a broad mobilization. The Big Nogai murzas, Saltanash Aksakov and Khoroshai Chubarmametev, were recruited for the upcoming campaign against Qaziy Kabardia and the Lesser Nogai Horde. Notably, as early as May 1640, the leaders of Qaziy Kabardia had attempted to diplomatically align with the Big Nogai Horde. Astrakhan voivodes recorded the arrival of a Kabardian embassy led by Hatokhshoqo Qaziy at the encampment ulus of Saltanash Aksakov, where a preliminary pact was drawn up:

"And they, the Kabardian murzas, signed an agreement with the Kabardian Circassians, and that he, Saltanash, with his brothers and his ulus people would protect them from the military Astrakhan soldiers and from the Azov Cossacks, and that they, the Kabardian Circassians, would stand together in solidarity, and that he, Saltanash, would roam with his uluses near Kabarda. And Saltanash-murza believed with them with all his soul."

Despite this earlier agreement, by the summer of 1641 Saltanash Aksakov answered Chalimat Qudenet's call to arms. The combined coalition forces mobilized by Chalimat and Aidemir-Shamkhal were estimated at 5,200 men by the Astrakhan voivode N. I. Odoevsky. Of these, 1,200 were provided by Nogai murzas Saltanash Aksakov and Khoroshai Chubarmametev, while the core consisted of 3,500 Circassian and Dagestani warriors. Based on contemporary mobilization data, historian Z. A. Kozhev estimates the coalition's core at 1,100 Circassians (including 300 from Jilakhstaney), 50 Bragun Kumyks, and 2,350 troops from the Shamkhalate of Tarki.

To reinforce this force, Chalimat Qudenet added a contingent of Russian service troops stationed at Terki to guard his lands. In his September 12, 1641 report to the Tsarist government, Terek voivode S. I. Shakhovsky estimated the Russian contingent at roughly 300 men: 100 mounted Streltsy, 18 boyar children, and 193 Okochan (Chechens) and local North Caucasian converts. However, N. I. Odoevsky reported a larger figure:

"...There were your sovereign's Terek military men, the head of the Strelets Ortemiy Shishmarev with the order and the Terek boyar children and the Terek and Greben Cossacks, about 500 people or more."

The Terek voivode likely understated the Russian troop count, omitting the participation of a significant detachment of Greben and Terek Cossasses consisting of at least 200 men.

On the opposing side, the combined army of Qaziy Kabardia and the Lesser Nogai Horde numbered slightly over 2,000 men, approximately three-fifths of whom were Circassians. The heavy armored cavalry of Alejuqo Shojenuqo, Hatokhshoqo Qaziy, and Alejuqo Sanjalay formed the strike force. This included over 1,000 horsemen from Qaziy Kabardia, 250 from the disputed Yidarey estates, and a detachment of service nobles belonging to Mutsal Sanjalay. Kozhev estimates "Mutsal's uzdens" at 90–100 men, bringing the total Circassian armored cavalry under Alejuqo and Hatokhshoqo to roughly 1,350 horsemen. The remaining shock cavalry consisted of about 800–900 Nogai warriors led by Soltan-murza Kasayev of the Lesser Nogai Horde.

==== Preparations ====
Although contemporary documents do not explicitly outline the coalition's march to the Malka River, Kozhev presents two potential routes. The first involved marching from Jilakhstaney across central Kabardia, fording swollen glacial rivers such as the Cherek and Baksan under constant threat of enemy ambushes—a scenario deemed unlikely. The more practical route involved assembling forces at the Sunzha River, crossing the Terek River above the Mozdok tract, and advancing westward toward Qaziy Kabardia's heartland in Pyatigorye. This route offered a safe river crossing far from enemy lines, while the high southern bank of the Malka River protected their left flank from surprise attacks. Given that the initial clashes occurred near the Lesser Nogai encampments in the mountains, the coalition almost certainly chose this second route along the left bank of the Malka, where the foothills transition into alpine pastures:

"And how, sovereign, they came to Kabarda, and at the same time the Kaziyev murzas Soltan-murza prince Kasayev son of Islamov with his brothers and with his ulus people were roaming near Kabarda in the It-Almas tract, and Kelmamet-murza de Murza Kudinetovich sent military Russian people and Cherkass to the pen in the It-Almas tract... and Kelmamet-murza himself with the rest of the military people remained behind. And your, the sovereign's military men captured many of the Kaziyev uluses and drove away horse and livestock herds."

==== The Battle ====
The battle took place on July 12, 1641, along the banks of the Malka River. Facing numerical inferiority against the combined Yidar, Russian, Nogai, Kumyk, and Okochan forces, Prince Alejuqo Shojenuqo employed a feigned retreat tactic. He concealed his main force—the elite, heavily armored Kabardian cavalry—in an ambush within a mountain gorge, positioning his Lesser Nogai allies in the foreground. The Nogais were instructed to engage the enemy and then feign a retreat, drawing the coalition army into a position that would expose their flank and rear to the hidden cavalry.

In the initial stage of the engagement, the two main armies did not immediately collide head-on. Because July was the peak month for driving livestock to alpine pastures, Chalimat's forces focused on striking the enemy's most vulnerable economic targets. The sprawling herds of horses and cattle being moved to higher ground proved difficult to protect. The vanguard led by Aidemir-Shamkhal quickly overran the Lesser Nogai outposts and became disorganized while seizing livestock. Unable to withstand the initial push, the Nogai vanguard staged a rapid retreat, drawing the coalition deeper into the terrain.

Distracted by plunder and assuming a swift victory, Aidemir-Shamkhal's forces lost formation, causing the coalition army to split into three dispersed groups. At that critical moment, Alejuqo's hidden armored cavalry emerged from the gorge in three heavy columns, striking the coalition's rear. Wedging into the gaps between the three separated enemy groups, the Kabardian cavalry enveloped and encircled the coalition army. The engagement turned into a complete rout, with Alejuqo's forces pursuing the surviving coalition troops until they were completely destroyed.

=== Later life and death ===
Akhle remained involved in relations between the Kabardian princes and the Russian authorities during the following years. In June 1643, Terek voivode Mikhail Volynsky sent a report to the Ambassadorial Prikaz concerning information received from Akhle. According to the report, on 28 April, Akhle's envoys Jansokh and his companions arrived at Terek City and reported that Akhle had ordered them to inform the authorities that Alejuqo and Hatokhshoqo, together with their brothers, Lesser Nogai princes and Abazins, had assembled their forces. The purpose of the gathering was unknown, and Akhle's representatives reported that they appeared to be preparing for a campaign.

The same report recorded information concerning Kozeta, the mother of Chalimat Yibaq. According to Volynsky, Kozeta had travelled from Lesser Kabardia to the Crimean Khanate to request military assistance against Alejuqo and Hatokhshoqo, who were holding her within the territories of Qaziy Kabardia. Akhle was also among those who reported this matter to the Russian authorities.

In 1644, Akhle was again mentioned in correspondence concerning an incident between Kabardian nobles. Prince Mutsal Shangelievich Cherkassky wrote to Volynsky concerning the visit of his uncle, Akhle Aytech, and his subsequent killing by Qambolet Pshiapshoqo, a noble. Mutsal requested that Volynsky investigate the killing, citing the Kabardian custom that guests were not to be harmed.

The name of Akhle Aytech (Or his domain, referred to as "Akhle Kabardia"), appears again in a December 1645 report by Terek voivode Vasily Obolensky to Tsar Alexei Mikhailovich concerning the swearing of allegiance of Kabardian princes to the Russian throne. According to Obolensky, on 13 October, princes and nobles from the Talostaney, Mudarey, Akhley, and Anzorey holdings arrived at Terek City together with the head of the Strelets, Ivan Kokoshkin. They presented documents of allegiance bearing their signatures and affirmed that their subjects, including peasants, nobles, and serfs, had sworn allegiance to the Russian throne on the Quran.

In August 1646, Obolensky informed the Ambassadorial Prikaz that several Kabardian nobles were being held as hostages in Terek City, including Yelmirza Jansokh, Batirbiy Yelmirza, Minbolet Akhle, and Surkhay Yibaq of Talostaney.

Obolensky further reported that Yelmirza Jansokh had been killed and that his holdings had been seized by Alejuqo and Hatokhshoqo. Regarding Akhle Aytech, he stated that his holdings were small and that Akhle spent little time there, instead moving between the holdings of his associates. Obolensky also noted that the presence of the hostages had not provided the Terek authorities with significant benefits or guarantees.

The voivode subsequently requested a royal decree concerning whether Yelmirza Jansokh, and Minbolet Akhle should continue to be held as hostages in Terek City.

Batirbiy Yelmirza was later sent to Moscow, where he converted to Orthodoxy and received the Christian name Peter. Minbolet, the son of Akhle Aytech, was eventually released from captivity in Terek City. A later document states that he was released because Akhle had died and Minbolet was his only surviving son. Akhle's death is dated to 1661 in the document, making Minbolet the sole surviving male descendant of his immediate family at the time of his release.
