= Mudar Alkhas =

Prince of Jilakhstaney
- Reign: c. 1620s – 1641
- Predecessor: Alkhas Jamirza
- Successor: Qaziy Mudar
- Born: 16th century Kabardia
- Died: 1641; Kabardia
- Issue: Qaziy Mudar
Names
- Mudar, son of Alkhas
- Kabardian: Алхъэс и къуэ Мудар
- House: Inalid dynasty; House of Jilakhstan; Mudar dynasty (founder)
- Father: Alkhas Jamirza
- Religion: Islam

Mudar Alkhas (Note: Kabardian: Алхъэс Мудар Russian: Мудар Алкасов) was a Kabardian prince from the Principality of Jilakhstaney within Kabardia active during the late 16th and early 17th centuries. A son of Alkhas Jamirza, he is mentioned in connection with the Kabardian frontier territories near the Terek River and the Georgian Military Road, where he appears among the regional nobles involved in the political affairs of the North Caucasus during a period of growing interaction between Kabardia, Russia, and Safavid Iran.

Russian documents from the early 17th century refer to Mudar in relation to diplomatic contacts, military movements against neighbouring Caucasian groups, and the allegiance of Kabardian and neighboring nobles. He is the founder of the Mudar dynasty that descended from Prince Jilakhstan. Later records describe members of his family as continuing to play a role in regional affairs and in relations with the Russian state.

== Biography ==
=== Domain ===
According to the ethnographer K. F. Stal, all Jilakhstaney princes trace their origins to Prince Jilakhstan, who reportedly fled from the Kuban region as a result of a blood feud. Together with his aul, he migrated across Kabardia and Chechnya and eventually reached the Yarmansu River in Kumyk territory, where he later died. His sons, Jamirza and Qanshau, subsequently returned westward along the Sunzha River to the Kinbla River and, after crossing the Kabardian Range, settled on the Psedakh River. Stal states that the Akhle family descended from Qanshau, while the Mudar family descended from Jamirza. Having established themselves on the Psedakh River, Qanshau and Jamirza occupied previously unclaimed land, and the population living under them paid yasak (tributary) to Kabardian princes in accordance with Kabardian custom.

=== Life ===
After the defeat of Qeytuqey princes by Temruqo Idar, Mudar settled and established control over the strategic route of Darial Gorge. By the end of the 16th century, the princes Sholokh and Mudar possessed equal territorial holdings extending from the Elkhotovo Gate to the mountain gorges along the right bank of the Terek River and the Sunzha Road. In 1589, a Russian embassy traveling through the region stopped at the "old Alkhas tavern," a settlement belonging to Mudar, who is described in the sources as a companion of Sholokh. The territory controlled by the two princes subsequently became known as Lesser Kabardia.

From 1587 to 1604, Prince Mudar and other Kabardian princes were engaged in conflicts with the Georgian eristavis of the land of Sioni. His forces, alongside allied murzas such as Sholokh Tepsaruqo, Aytech Qanshau, and Ivak Tepsaruqo, conducted repeated raids into the Son territory, resulting in the capture of prisoners and livestock and the devastation of local settlements. Mudar maintained fortified positions ("kabaks") at the entrance to the Darial Gorge, allowing him to exert military control through the pass. According to reports by Russian envoys in 1587, Mudar collected tribute from the Duchy of Ksani, owned by the Georgian ruler of identified as Prince Aristov.

Between 1596 and 1597, Kabardian forces under Princes Sholokh Tepsaruqo and Aytech Qanshau captured settlements belonging to Sultan-Murza and established positions within the gorge. As the Kabardian raids expanded southward into regions such as Sioni and Ksani, the campaign brought widespread destruction, including killings, plunder, and the taking of captives.

During these operations, Mudar Alkhas acted separately from the main raiding leadership. Rather than fully aligning himself with Sholokh and Aytech, he warned King Alexander II of Kakheti about the incursions and released a number of prisoners taken during the attacks.

Mudar's conduct revealed divisions within the Kabardian leadership and created tensions among the invading princes. Sholokh, angered by Mudar's interference, appealed to the Russian commanders in Terek to take measures against him. King Alexander intervened diplomatically, urging the Russian authorities not to act against Mudar and stressing his loyalty to the Russian Tsar. By 1597, the raids had become severe enough for Alexander II to formally report the situation to Russian envoys. In his account, he described how Sholokh and Aytech had devastated the Sioni region and carried off numerous captives.

In 1604, Mudar Alkhas again led large scaled raids into the territories of Sonsky, owned by Prince Aristov that devastated the region, Mudar Alkhas expressed his relations with Aristov in a letter to ambassador Birkin. He declared to Birkin that he could not escort his embassy to Georgia as follows:

"I will send... you to be escorted to the Sonian (Ksani) lands; but I cannot escort you further than the Sonian lands, because now Aristov of Son is not in the world with me."

Mudar's name appears in a report sent by the Terek voevoda P. P. Golovin to the Posolsky Prikaz between November 1614 and February 1615. The document records the taking of the “shert” (oath of allegiance) to the Russian state by the Kabardian princes Sholokh Tepsaruqo, Qaziy Pshiapshoqo, and Aytech Qanshau, while also noting Mudar's departure to the court of the Persian Shah Abbas.

According to the report, the Terek resident and son of a boyar, Moisey Piminov, advised Golovin to ensure that the Kabardian princes "swore allegiance to Russia according to the Muslim law" and did not defect to Shah Abbas. During his mission, Piminov visited the domain of Mudar Alkhas, who went against the shert and was absent at the time due to his stay in Persia, and instead delivered the tsar's charter to Mudar's brother, Pyshta. Piminov subsequently met with the princes Sholokh and Qaziy Pshiapshoqo, who declared that they, together with all their uzdens, would remain loyal to Russia and had attempted to dissuade Mudar from entering the shah's service. Mudar nevertheless traveled to Persia, where he reportedly gained the favor of Shah Abbas while still expressing interest in maintaining relations with Russia.

The report further noted that Tsar Michael Fyodorovich was aware that Sholokh Tepsaruqo, other Kabardian princes, and Circassians had previously established alliance with the Tsardom during the reign of Tsar Ivan in connection with the embassy of Kardan Indarov (1609–1614). In March 1615, the envoys were dismissed by the tsar with rich gifts.

In February, an Astrakhan Tatar who had escaped from Mudar's captivity arrived in the city of Terek and reported that, In the spring of 1615, approximately thirty Qizilbash retainers in the service of Shah Abbas, described in the sources as Persians and "Chechen Kazaks", initially stayed in Mudar's settlements before Mudar relocated with all his dependents to fortified positions near the Terek River, in the mountain defiles along the Georgian Road, an area previously frequented by Russian envoys traveling to Georgia. According to this report, Mudar openly boasted of his alliance with Shah Abbas, placing great hopes in Safavid support. In particular, the shah was expected to send a representative to secure the return of Mudar's son, who was being held hostage in Terek. At least, this was the version of events that Mudar himself communicated to other Kabardian princes. Subsequently, Mudar moved his taverns into the Darial Gorge and blocked the Georgian Military Road. This action was undertaken specifically in order to maintain reliable communications with the Persian garrisons stationed in Georgia. In effect, the Greater Caucasus Range functioned as the northern frontier of Iran, and control over the Darial passage was of strategic importance. Mudar placed guards near his taverns and thoroughly fortified all of them, thereby strengthening his position in the region and securing Safavid influence in the central Caucasus.

As a result of these developments, in 1615 Shah Abbas, with the assistance of Kabardians under Mudar and Kumyks led by Ildar and Giray, launched an invasion of the Kingdom of Kakheti. The campaign ended with the conquest of Kakheti, further consolidating Safavid power in eastern Georgia and demonstrating the military and political significance of Kabardian and Kumyk cooperation in Abbas's Caucasian policy.

These actions conflicted with Russian interests in the region at a time when the Tsardom of Russia was weakened by the Time of Troubles. During the early 17th century, Russia experienced a prolonged period of political instability marked by the death of Tsar Boris Godunov, the Bolotnikov uprising, the campaigns of the False Dmitrys, and the eventual liberation of Moscow from Polish–Lithuanian occupation.

Mudar Alkhas was killed in 1641. In Russian reports, he was remember as a good ally, praised by the ambassadors:

"Mudar murza served us and brought into our service Kumyk and Circassian murzas with many people."

Many Kabardian princes, namely Yeldar Yibaq, Narchu Yelbezduqo, Akhle Aytech, and Qaziy Alkhas, wanted to avenge Mudar Alkhas, reaction from other princes is recorded as follows:

“…performed according to their faith over Mudar Alkhas lamentation and weeping, and agreed among themselves and went to avenge Mudar upon Alejuqo and Hatokhshoqo…”

== Sources ==
- Kardanov, Ch. E. (2016). Князья Кабарды [Princes of Kabarda] (in Russian). Nalchik: Izdatel'stvo M. i V. Kotlyarovykh. ISBN 978-5-93680-971-2.
