= Sholokh the Mighty =

Grand Prince of Kabardia between 1609 and 1616

Sholokh Tepsaruqo
- Sholokh the Mighty
- Tamga of the house of Talostaney

Grand Prince of Kabardia
- Reign: 1609 – 1616
- Predecessor: Jansokh Qeytuqo
- Successor: Qudenet Qambolet

Prince of the Principality of Talostaney
- Reign: fl. 1569 – 1616
- Predecessor: Tepsaruqo Talostan
- Successor: Qarashey Sholokh
- Born: 16th century Kabardia
- Died: 1616; Kabardia
- Issue: Qarashey; Alkhas; Talostan; Jantemruqo; Anfoq
Names
- Sholokh, son of Tepsaruqo
- Kabardian: Тепсэрыкъу и къуэ Щэулэхъу
- House: Inalid dynasty; House of Talostan
- Father: Tepsaruqo Talostan
- Religion: Sunni Islam
- Military career
- Nickname: The Mighty
- Conflicts: Crimean–Circassian wars; § War against Ghazi ibn Urak; Ottoman-Safavid war; Shirvan expedition; Kabardian Civil War (1589); Circassian–Georgian wars; Circassian raids into Georgia (1587-1604); Daryal campaign; Kabardian Civil War (1615)

Sholokh Tepsaruqo (Note: Kabardian: Тепсэрыкъу Щолэхъу Russian: Шолох Тапсаруков Turkish: Şoloh Tepsarıqo, Solukh bey in Ottoman archives) also known as Sholokh the Mighty (Note: Kabardian: Щэджащэ Щолэхъу) was a Kabardian grand prince from the House of Talostan and a dominant political figure in Kabardia in the late 16th and early 17th centuries. A son of Tepsaruqo Talostan, he participated in occasional factional struggles among the Circassian nobility and gradually consolidated power through a combination of military success and strategic alliances.

From the 1580s onward, Sholokh was actively engaged in regional conflicts, leading campaigns across the central Caucasus and intervening in the affairs of neighboring polities, including Kartli, the lands of the Nogai, and Crimean Tatars. His growing authority brought him into contact with Muscovy, which increasingly treated him as its principal interlocutor in Kabardian affairs. Sholokh is said to be the most important political figure in Kabardia between 1598 and 1613, and that Russia conducted all its political activities with him.

By 1609, he had secured the position of Grand Prince of Kabardia, marking the height of his influence. His rule was defined by continued rivalry with other princely houses, culminating in the major civil conflict of 1615 against Qaziy Pshiapshoqo. Sholokh died the following year, leaving a legacy preserved in Circassian oral tradition, where he is remembered as a formidable war leader and one of the most powerful princes of his era.

== Biography ==
=== Early life ===
==== Personality and domain ====
According to the Kabardian historian Shora Nogmov, Sholokh Tepsaruqo was a "restless man" who played a role in the political fragmentation of Kabardia. Nogmov attributed to him the initiative of dividing his lands with his cousins, as well as contributing to internal disputes among the Kabardian population. He reportedly "sowed discord and stirred up unrest among the people", and subsequently led a number of warks and elders across the Terek River, where they settled on its right bank. The songs about Sholokh depict him as "the greatest" and "the bravest among the knights", sources also mention he was a people's favorite during his reign.

The territory occupied by these settlers subsequently became known as Lesser Kabardia, or Talostaney. Nogmov's account associates the division of Kabardia into Greater and Lesser Kabarda with the period of Sholokh's activity. Sholokh Tepsaruqo apparently began establishing his own principality around 1569, during a period of intensified Crimean activity in the North Caucasus. This coincided with the campaigns of Kasim and Devlet Giray, who led Crimean raids against Astrakhan.

Flag used by the Principality of Talostaney

The location of Sholokh's possessions has been discussed in detail by historian E. N. Kusheva. By the end of the 16th century, Kabardians occupied the plains and foothills along the left tributaries of the Terek River, extending toward the entrances of the mountain gorges, as well as territories on the right bank of the Terek. Kusheva identified this general area as corresponding approximately to the territories later known as Greater Kabardia and Lesser Kabardia.

Sholokh's influence also extended to settlements and routes along the Terek. According to Kusheva, the embassy of Zvenigorodsky, while travelling toward Georgia, stopped on the right bank of the Terek near the "old Alkhas tavern". The tavern was associated with Alkhas Jamirza, who belonged to the Jilakhstan dynasty and was described as a "great friend" of Sholokh Tepsaruqo. The names Sholokhov Taverns and Mudar Taverns were likewise derived from their founders, Sholokh Tepsaruqo and Mudar Alkhas.

==== War against Ghazi ibn Urak ====
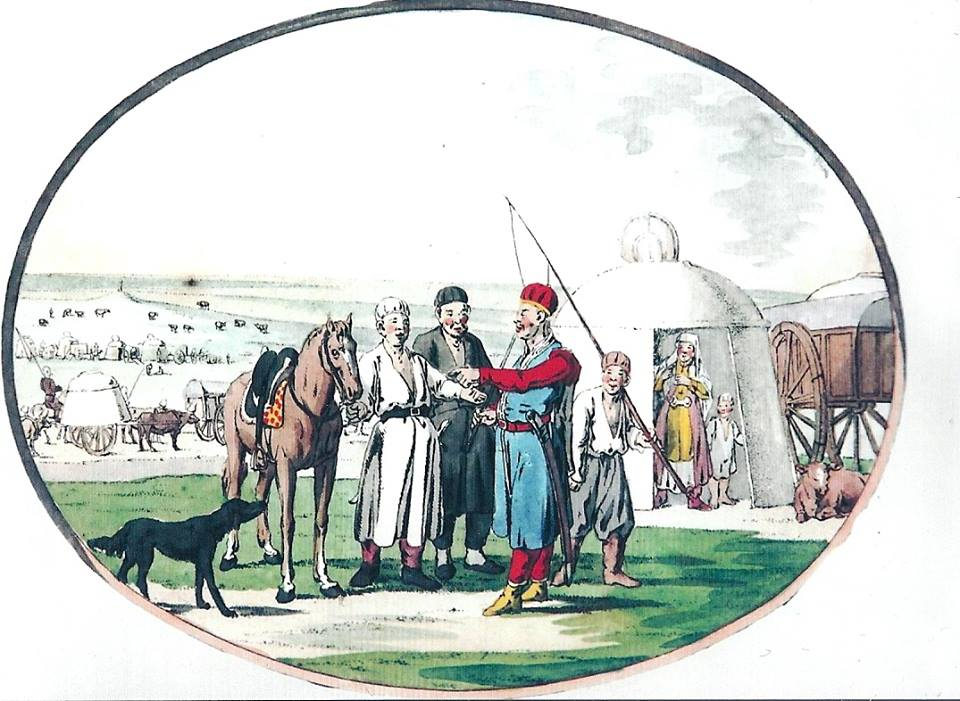
Nogais and Tatars

In 1576, the forces of the Lesser Nogai bey Ghazi ibn Urak were defeated by the Kabardians led by sons of Temruqo and Sholokh Tepsaruqo. Nogai forces entered Kabardia and killed many, but they were briefly defeated by the Kabardians on their return. In addition to Ghazi ibn Urak, two of his brothers and several of his sons, as well as Iman-Girey and Chebar-Murza were murdered by the Kabardian forces during one of the battles. Pshiapshoqo Qeytuqo fought on the side of the Nogais and the Crimeans, pursuing a pro-Crimean policy. According to Khotko, Pshiapshoqo, as all Nogai forces were killed, also died in the battlefield in 1576. Pshiapshoqo was stopped being mentioned in ancient charters and sources in the 1580s. His successor was his son, Qaziy Pshiapshoqo, who gave the region its name; "Qaziy Kabardia".

==== Relations with Russia ====
Sholokh was recognized by Russian authorities as possessing considerable influence within Kabardian society. Russian officials operating from the Terek city maintained contact with him and sought his involvement in matters concerning Kabardia. In one instance, the governors of the Terek city invited Sholokh Tepsaruqo to come and discuss "the sovereign's Kabardian affairs". His involvement in such negotiations indicates the political importance attributed to him by the Russian administration and his position as one of the influential Kabardian princes of the period.

By July 1588, Sholokh's fiefdom was situated in the territory that subsequently became known as Lesser Kabardia. The principal route from the North Caucasus toward Georgia passed through his possessions, giving Sholokh and his ally Alkhas Gilakhstanov strategic importance to the Russian government. Moscow consequently sought to strengthen its relations with both princes.

In 1589, the Russian government sent letters to Sholokh and Alkhas requesting that they provide an escort for the embassy of S. G. Zvenigorodsky, which was travelling to Georgia. The two princes refused to provide the requested escort. Their refusal caused dissatisfaction among the Russian authorities, and the Ambassadorial Prikaz subsequently issued a rescript to A. I. Khvorostinin, the voivode of the Terek city, requesting that he dispatch "servicemen against Prince Sholokh Tepsaruqo." In September 1589, Mamstruk Temryukovich likewise requested that Russian servicemen be sent against Sholokh. The episode marked a deterioration in relations between Sholokh and the Russian administration, despite Moscow's earlier efforts to secure his cooperation in facilitating communications with Georgia.

=== Civil strife in Kabardia (1589) ===
==== Background ====
The last decade of the 16th century was a period in which the North Caucasus became the center of geopolitical rivalry among major powers. Due to the Ottoman–Safavid War of 1578–1590, the region turned into both a staging ground and transit route for Ottoman and Crimean forces advancing into the South Caucasus. During this period, the Tsardom of Moscow sought to maintain its influence in the region by constructing strategic military fortresses along the Terek River.

Diplomatic contacts between Kabardia and Moscow stalled after the death of Grand Prince Temruqo Yidar, but were revived in 1577 under the leadership of Temruqo's brother, Qambolet Yidar. Unlike the earlier period of the 1550s–1560s, this new phase saw not only the Yidarey dynasty, but also other influential princely families such as the Qeytuqo's and Talostaney's sending envoys to Moscow and participating in the diplomatic process. This indicates that the Yidareys' diplomatic monopoly over relations with Moscow was beginning to weaken.

In July 1588, an oath of allegiance (shert) was signed between the Yidarey family and Tsar Ivan Fedorovich of Russia, forming the main legal basis of the 1589 crisis. The main provisions of the agreement included:

- Union with Russia: Moscow pledged to place Kabardia under its protection and defend the Yidareys against external enemies.
- Military Fortification: A fortress was built on the Terek River, garrisoned by Russian troops equipped with firearms.
- Subjugation of Rivals: The Yidareys undertook the obligation to force Kabarda's most powerful internal rivals —Sholokh Tepsaruqo, Aslanbech I Qeytuqo and Jansokh Qeytuqo— into submission under Russian authority and to take hostages (amanats) from them.

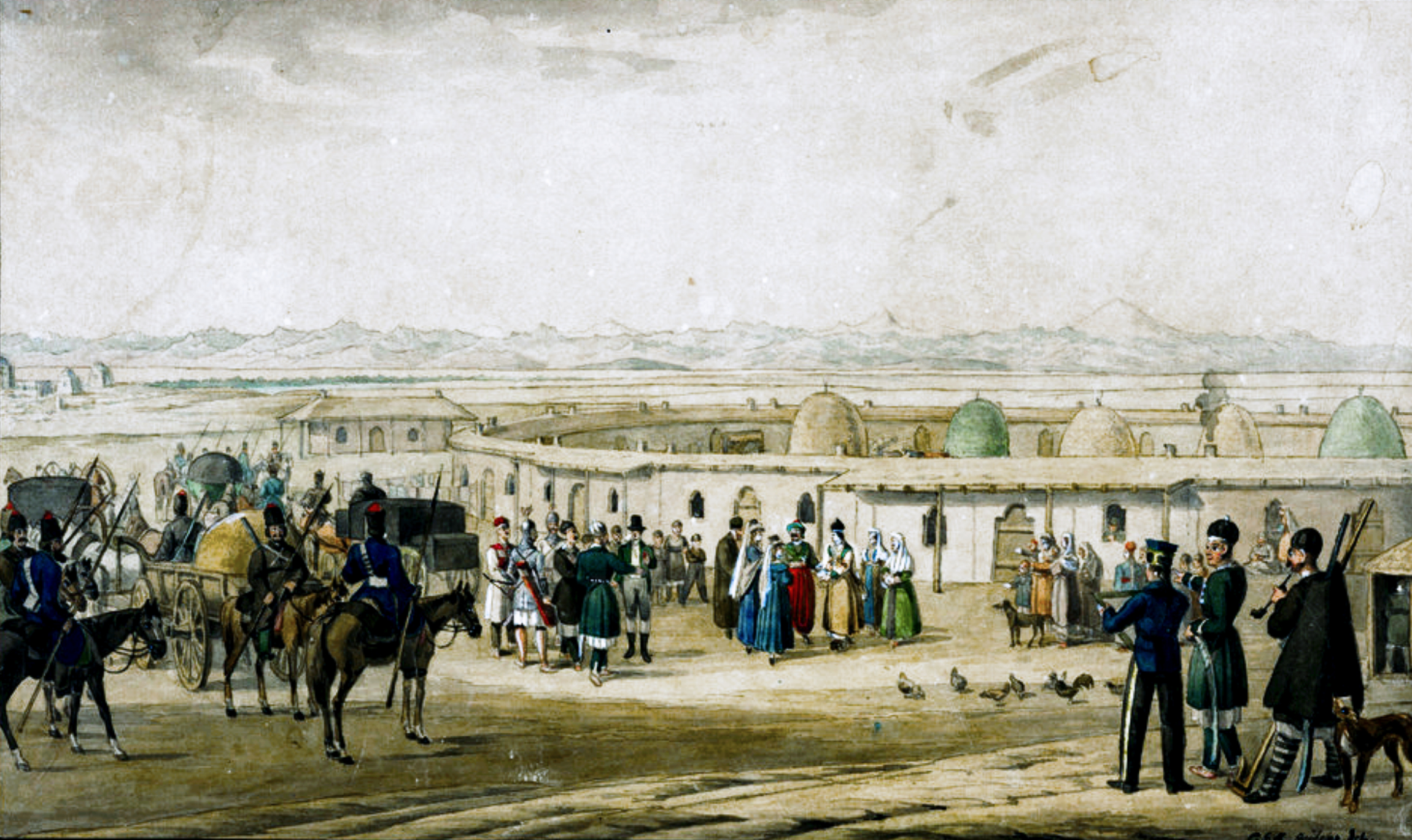
Visit of Russians to a Circassian prince

At the time, Kabarda was divided into four main feudal units: the Yidarey, Qeytuqo, Talostaney, and Jilakhstaney dynasties. In terms of military strength and population, the Qeytuqo's and Talostaney's controlled roughly two-thirds of Kabarda's total power.

The immediate trigger of the crisis was the death of Grand Prince Qambolet Yidar in early 1589. His death created a conflict between the traditional system of succession and the new political order the Yidareys sought to establish with Russian support. According to traditional law, the succession of grand princely authority was claimed to belong to Aslanbech I of Kabardia, while Sholokh Tepsaruqo, the Talostaney leader —widely respected and celebrated in heroic epics— emerged as one of the strongest contenders. The Yidareys, aiming to protect their own clan interests and fulfill their obligations under the 1588 agreement, involved Russian military power in this succession struggle.

==== The campaign ====
In November 1589, a coalition of the Qeytuqo and Idarey factions launched a coordinated military campaign against the Principality of Talostaney owned by Sholokh Tepsaruqo, because of his political rivalry with Russia. They were supported by approximately 750 Russian Cossack troops sent from the Terek voivodeship under the command of Grigory Poltev. The operation aimed to eliminate Talostaney resistance and prevent outside influence from Ottoman, Crimean, and Kumyk-aligned forces. The allied forces held a significant numerical advantage, fielding around 4,500 cavalry compared to Talostaney's estimated 2,000 horsemen. The campaign was conducted rapidly and with heavy destruction. Contemporary accounts describe the burning or capture of more than 30 out of roughly 40 settlements in Talostaney territory. Sholokh Tepsaruqo's forces were decisively defeated. He was forced to submit, and compelled to recognize Jansokh Qeytuqo's authority as the Grand Prince of Kabardia. he handed over hostages, including his son and twenty other nobles.

The event is reported as follows:

"By the sovereign's order, I came to Kabarda on November 21st to the sovereign's disobedient people, who did not want to be under the sovereign's hand, but maintained friendship with the Turkish people and the Crimean Tsar and with Shevkal and the Kumyk people ... And I came with the sovereign's people with a fiery battle, and with me the Circassian army, I fought and burned and brought all the Kabardian land under the sovereign's hand and cleared the way to you and released your ambassadors from Kabarda to you."

==== Aftermath ====
The political crisis of 1589 seemed to have ended in complete victory for the Yidareys and Qeytuqey's, as Sholokh could not be elected as the Grand Prince of Kabardia. However, This victory remained temporary, as A. I. Lobanov-Rostovsky's Genealogy directly speaks of Jansokh Qeytuqo as cited:

"The principality was given to him in Moscow under Tsar Feodor Ivanovich of all Russia, as he was in Moscow, but in Kabarda they did not give him a principality"

Meaning, he was formally recognised as the Grand Prince of Kabardia by Russia, but the Kabardian council did not accept him as one. He visited Moscow in 1592 and apparently only then officially received the charter for the principality. But even after this, his recognition in Kabarda as a legitimate Grand Prince did not occur.

=== Later life ===
==== Daryal campaign ====
In 1596, Sholokh Tepsaruqo, together with Aytech Qanshau, led a Kabardian expedition through the Daryal Gorge. The Kabardian forces seized several fortified settlements in the gorge belonging to Sultan-Murza, an Ingush ruler associated with Lars, before advancing southward into the mountainous borderlands of the Kingdom of Kartli. Their campaign targeted the areas of Sioni and Ksani, where they carried out raids and took captives.

The campaign was reported to the Russian government in May 1597 by King Alexander II of Kakheti, who informed the Russian envoys Kuzma Savin and Andrei Polukhanov that Sholokh and Aytech Qanshau had invaded the land of Soni, killing inhabitants and taking numerous captives. Alexander referred to Sholokh as a "Kabardian ruler", indicating his considerable political standing among the Kabardian princes.

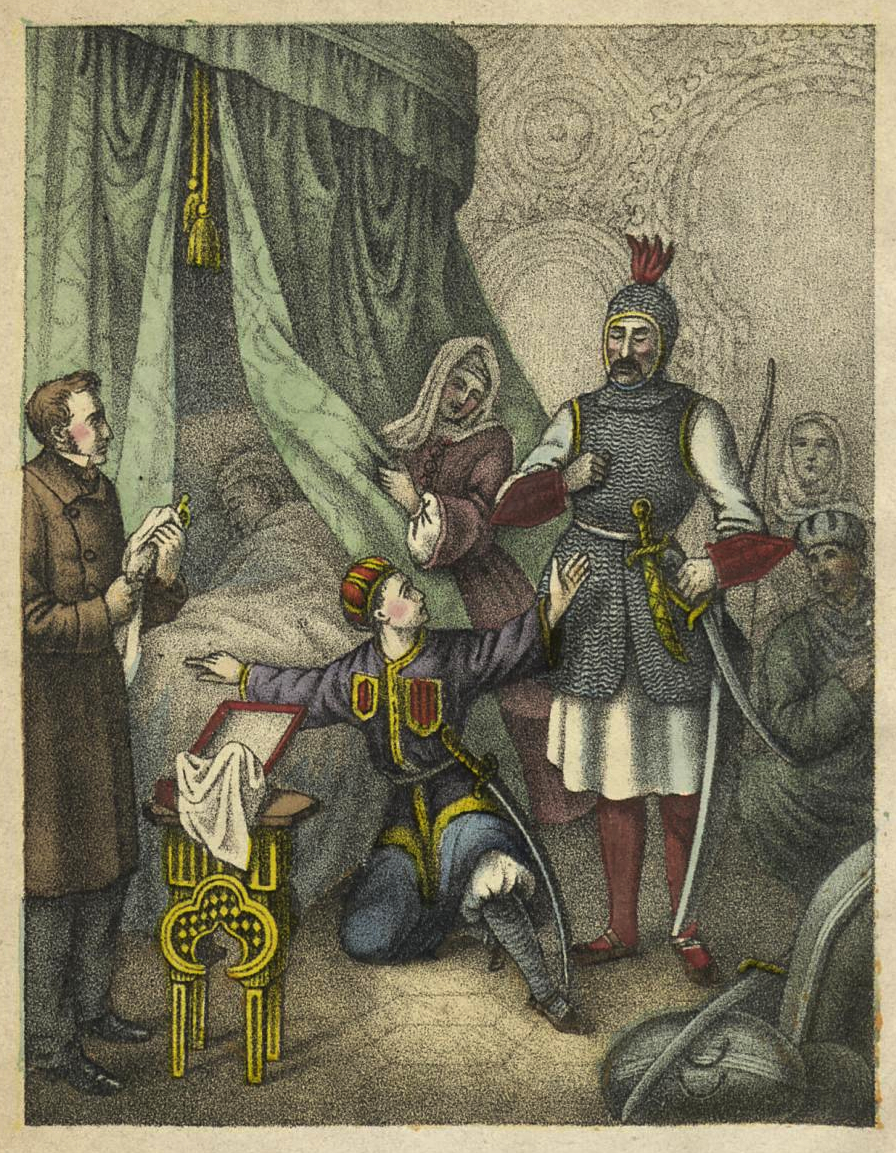
"Among the Circassians" by an unknown author.

The expedition also brought Sholokh into conflict with Mudar Alkhas, another prominent Kabardian prince. Mudar reportedly warned Alexander of Sholokh's actions and released a number of captives taken during the campaign. In response, Sholokh sought to persuade the Russian voivodes stationed at Terek to take military action against Mudar. Alexander subsequently appealed to the Russian commanders not to intervene against Mudar, promising that Mudar would resolve any dispute with the tsar and remain loyal to Russia.

The campaign strengthened Kabardian control over the Daryal route and contributed to the expansion of Kabardian political and military influence toward eastern Georgia during the late 16th and early 17th centuries.

==== Civil war of 1601 ====
In 1601, a political crisis in Kabardia culminated in the collapse of the Russian-aligned Yidarey principality. Members of the Yidarey dynasty, including Domanuk and Mamstruk Cherkassky, were assassinated, while their lands and followers were taken over by the Qeytuqey faction under Qaziy Pshiapshoqo. Several Yidarey princes subsequently migrated toward the Terek under Russian protection.

Following the collapse of the Yidarey position, the Qeytuqey and Talostaney factions reached an agreement, exchanging hostages to secure their alliance. The agreement united the two major Kabardian factions against the remaining Yidareys and growing Russian influence in Kabardia, creating a temporary political realignment that dominated the region in the following years.

Sholokh succeeded Jansokh Qeytuqo, It is difficult to determine the exact duration of Jansokh's reign in Kabardia, as there are discrepancies in the sources, but his death is most likely between 1592 and 1596. In the late 16th and early 17th centuries, Sholokh became the Grand Prince of Kabardia. Moscow did not recognize this title and omitted the fact in its charters addressed to him. Sources date Sholokh's election to be in 1609.

=== As the Grand Prince of Kabardia ===
==== Political activity ====
Sholokh, having consolidated his position as Grand Prince of Kabardia, acted to stabilize his authority within a complex regional environment. He maintained diplomatic relations with Moscow during the Time of Troubles, avoiding direct confrontation while preserving political flexibility.

In 1614, following the accession of Mikhail I of Russia, representatives of the major Kabardian princely houses entered into a formal agreement with Russian envoys, affirming cooperation and mutual obligations under terms similar to earlier charters between Kabardian rulers and Russian sovereigns. This arrangement is generally interpreted as a political alliance rather than direct subordination. At the same time, Sholokh continued active diplomatic engagement with neighboring powers, including Safavid Iran, the Crimean Khanate, and the Shamkhalate, reflecting a multi-directional foreign policy.

By 1615, Sholokh was involved in the shifting political relations between Kabardian princes, Tsardom of Russia, the Ottoman Empire, and Safavid Empire. In that year, Sholokh, Qaziy Pshiapshoqo, Mudar Alkhas, Qudenet Qambolet, and Nartshu Yelbezduq swore allegiance to Tsar Michael I of Russia. The oath was reported to the Ambassadorial Prikaz by the voivode of the Terek city, Golovin. At the same time, however, Golovin reported that Mudar Alkhas had departed for the court of Shah Abbas I of Persia in February, an action which appeared inconsistent with the recent oath of allegiance to Russia.

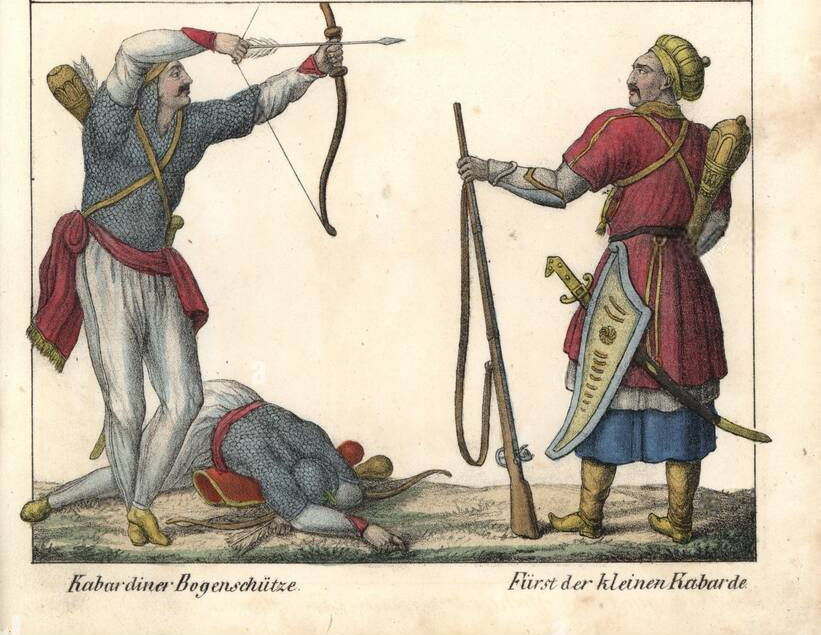
Lesser Kabardian warriors

On 6 February 1615, Golovin further informed the Ambassadorial Prikaz that Sholokh and Qaziy Pshiapshoqo had likewise sent their nobles to Shah Abbas, despite having recently "accepted the shert" in the presence of the Russian envoy, the boyar Pyotr Smagin. Their actions reflected the complex political position of the Kabardian princes, who maintained relations with multiple regional powers while formally recognizing Russian authority.

The situation became more tense in the spring of 1615 amid fears of an Ottoman military advance into the North Caucasus. On 2 April, the Astrakhan governor N. I. Odoevsky informed Moscow of a possible attack by Ottoman forces against the Terek city and Astrakhan, with the intention of using the North Caucasus as a route into Transcaucasia.

Shortly afterwards, Keldysh Nyrkaev, described as Sholokh's bridle, arrived at the Terek city and reported that the Sultan of the Ottoman Empire had sent letters to Qaziy Pshiapshoqo and Sholokh. Nyrkaev informed Golovin that Qaziy intended to campaign against the Persians alongside the Ottoman forces. The reports further demonstrated the uncertain political alignments of the Kabardian princes during the period.

=== Civil war of 1615 ===
Internally, Sholokh faced opposition from Qaziy Pshiapshoqo and the Qeytuqo clan. In confronting this faction, he drew upon existing blood feuds involving the Qeytuqo dynasty, particularly those connected to the killings of Domanuko Temryukovich and Mamstruk Temryukovich, as part of the broader struggle for power within Kabardia. The relations between Sholokh and Qaziy Pshiapshoqo, worsened with Qazi harboring of Sholokh's rebellious brother, Pyshta Murza.

In November 11th of 1615, Sholokh together with his eldest son Qarashey, launched a major campaign against their enemy Qazy Pshiapshoqo's domain. Sholokh was supported by Ishterek Bey from the Nogai Horde and Budachai of Tarki. He led his forces deep into Qazy's domain, which was located in Greater Kabarda. He kept his advance until the Kurkhudzin River, where Qaziy Pshiapshoqo and Sholokh's brother Pyshta Tepsaruqo were killed in a major battle. Along with Qaziy, his nephews Aslanbech's son Inarmas, Aksak Qeytuqo, Qanoqo's son Kudenet, Jansokh's son Dokhshuqo, and Shodjenuqo's son Anfok were murdered and the Russian voivode Ivan Nagaev was wounded, then later captured by Sholokh's forces.

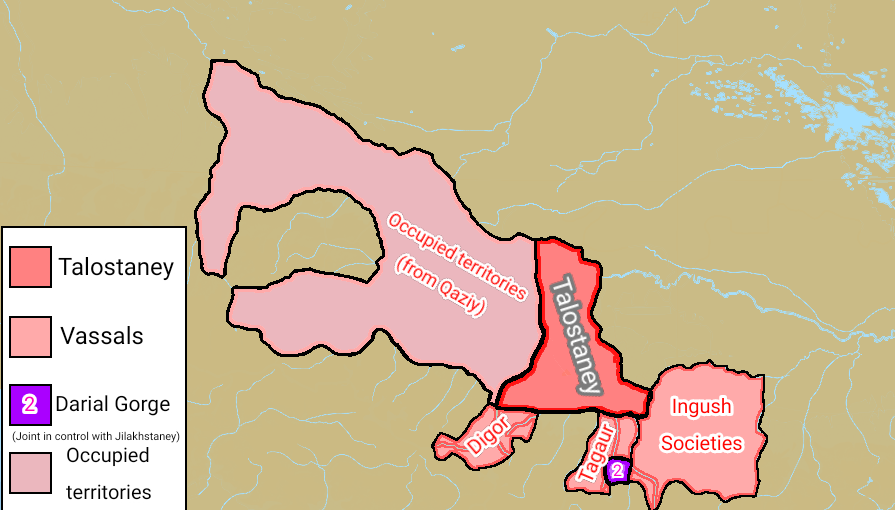
Talostaney at its greatest extent, with its vassals and tributaries

After devastating the lands of Qazy's Kabarda, Sholokh withdrew back to his lands with total success. But the relatives of Qazy Pshiapshoqo, Kilish Jansokh, Chereguq Yelbezduq, and Qul Qeytuqo went to Russia to ask them for help against Sholokh to get revenge. Russia gave the relatives of Pshiapshoqo a big army under the command of Peter Priklonsky. With the assistance from the military men from Russia, relatives of Pshiapshoqo invaded Talostaney, but they were ultimately stopped by the eldest son of Sholokh, Qarashey Sholokh.

==== In legends ====
Shora Nogmov also attributed a military victory over a Kalmyk and Tatar raiding force to Sholokh Tepsaruqo, apparently dating the event to the beginning of the 17th century. According to Nogmov, a force of approximately 3,000 warriors entered Kabardian territory, burning farmsteads, driving away herds, and taking a number of captives. Upon learning of the raid, the Kabardians reportedly assembled a force of approximately 1,000 selected horsemen from Greater Kabardia and 500 men from Lesser Kabardia. Command of the combined force was entrusted to Sholokh.

Nogmov states that Sholokh immediately attacked the raiders with a "terrible cry", causing the Kalmyks to retreat and abandon their captured livestock and other spoils. Sholokh then divided his forces, sending approximately 500 warriors back toward Kabardia with the recovered spoils while pursuing the retreating raiders with the remaining 1,000 men. The pursuit culminated in a battle in the steppe, during which, according to Nogmov, the Kalmyk and Tatar forces suffered heavy losses. The account presents Sholokh as one of the principal military leaders of Kabarda during the period.

=== Death ===
According to The Genealogy of the Kabardian Princes and Murzas, Sholokh Tepsaruqo, who "did not receive a sovereign's salary from the Russian state," died in 1616, reportedly of natural causes.

== Legacy ==
=== Folklore ===
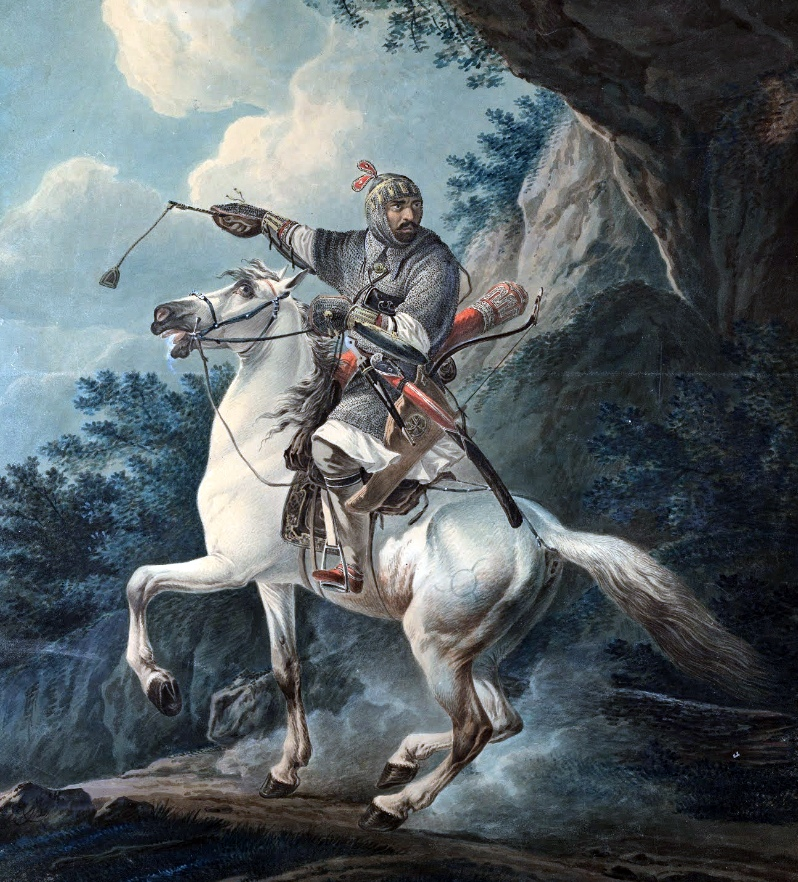
"Eastern Warrior" by Aleksander Orłowski. A Circassian cavalryman riding a horse of Sholokh breed.

Sholokh Tepsaruqo's authority among his fellow tribesmen is reflected in Kabardian folklore. Songs about Sholokh portray him as "the greatest" and "the bravest among the knights", describing him as a popular and beloved figure during his reign. These epithets were more than conventional expressions of oral tradition, reflecting his reputation as a courageous, experienced warrior and a respected leader among his people. There is a recorded Kabardian folkloric song about Sholokh, called "The song of Sholokh":

Щэджащэгуэ ди Щолэхъужьи, лIыхъужьхэмэ уранэхъ хахуэт!

ХахуэкIэрэ ди джатэрыжэ, жэрыбэри дэ къыдэзыти!

Зи тыгъэ гущэмэ щIэмыфыгъужи, Андзор и къуэкIэ Исмелышхуэ!

А махуэмэ Дулакъ и къуэжьмэ джатэпэкIэ уныбгъэдохьэ.

Щэджащэм бгъэдыхьа шури пхэнейм трегъэпсыхэ!

ПащтыхьитIыр тахътэм щытесмэ, джатэпэкIэ закъезыгъащIэ!

А махуэмэ дуней гъэбжьыфIэти, хэщIапIэхэм ныщыпэрытти!

Мыхъурыжьурэ чыданэ Iэпщэри а махуэмэ тхуэзыгъэгъуазэ!

Хур пщащэхэр зи нэрылъагъуи, пщIэгъуалэм лъысыр ножэжи!

Зэуапэр къытхузахешэ, къутасым лъыхэр хебгъашэщ!

Къэбэрдейми ди пхъэр пэрышэ, пашагъэм и гъуазэ пэжти.

Къурату лIыхъумэ и зы блэр нрегъэкъутэ!

Хьэту и къуэкIэ ди Иналыкъуэ, Жансит и къъуэкIэ ди Мырзэбэчи!

Мэчарэ и къуэкIэ Созэрыхьэшхуэ и зыгум шэр хрегъасэ!

Translation:

Our great Sholokh the Mighty, among the warriors you were the bravest!

Our brave swordsman, he is the one gifting us herds of swift-footed horses!

Never regretting what he give, Andzor's son Yismel the Great!

On that day toward the great son of Dulaq, you carve a path for youself with the point of your sword.

The Mighty warrior throws the approaching rider onto the rump of this horse (takes prisoner)!

To emperors sitting on the throne, he makes his presence felt to them with the point of his sword!

On that day he was an ornament of the world, at gatherings he was the leading one!

With an ancient marked sword with a twisted hilt, on that day you blazed a trail for us!

Having seen the houris with his own eyes, your blood streams from your white horse!

The one who started the battle first, watered the feather grass with his blood!

The first to rally the Kabardians in pursuit, you hold the primacy.

The warrior from Quratu lets his shoulder be shattered!

Our Yinaliqo, son of Hatu, our Mirzabech, son of Jansit!

Sozarih the Great, son of Machara, took a bullet straight to the heart!

=== Family ===
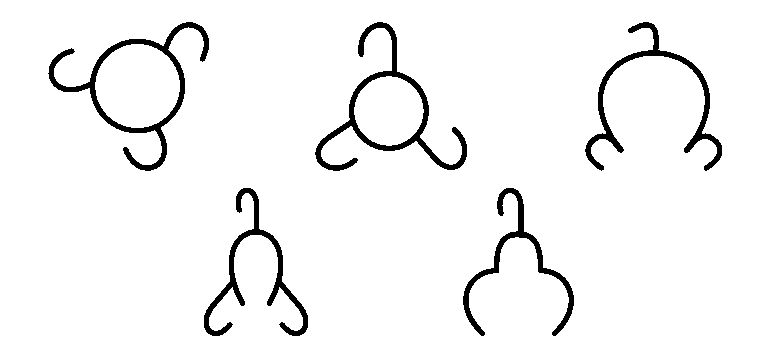
Tamgas used by the descendants of Sholokh

According to "the genealogy of the Kabardian princes and murzas", Sholokh had five sons:

Qarashey, described in the genealogy as a distinguished and physically imposing man, noted for his curly hair and broad shoulders. He was killed by Mudar and Akhle in their settlements. Following the arrival of the Crimean forces, Qarashey fled together with his three brothers. He was later killed by the children of Pyshta, Bech and Zaurbech, who sought revenge for their father's death Alkhas, who had no children. He was killed jointly by Mudar, Akhle, and Qarashey. Talostan, who was likewise childless. He spent many years stationed at the Terek, serving in the Russian Amanats (hostages). He was eventually killed by Mudar, Akhle, and Qarashey. Jamtemruqo, who had no children and was killed in the mountains. Anfoq, who was childless and died a natural death.
