= Mirza of Kabardia =

Mirza Jilakhstan

Grand Prince of Kabardia
- Reign: 1491–1491/1492
- Predecessor: Jilakhstan Minbolet
- Successor: Talostan Jankhot
- Born: 15th century Kabardia
- Died: 1491/1492; Kabardia
Names
- Mirza, son of Jilakhstan
- Kabardian: Жылахъстэн и къуэ Мырзэ
- Father: Jilakhstan of Kabardia

Mirza Jilakhstan was a Kabardian prince mentioned in the Arabic manuscript al-‘Uqūd al Jawhariyya fī al Mahāsin al Dawla al Ashrafiyya al Ghawiyya (AS 3313) who briefly ruled as the Grand Prince of Kabardia in the late 15th century. He is known primarily from the same manuscript, which describes his conflict with his uncle Talostan Jankhot during a dynastic struggle in Kabardia.

== Biography ==
According to the Arabic manuscript al-‘Uqūd al Jawhariyya fī al Mahāsin al Dawla al Ashrafiyya al Ghawiyya (shortened as AS 3313), Mirza was the son of Jilakhstan and became the Grand Prince of Kabardia following his father's death around 1491.

The beginning of Mirza's reign marked a new phase in the dynastic struggle for power in Kabardia, this time between the young prince and his uncle Talostan Jankhot. Talostan, who according to the manuscript had lived among the Tatars of the Great Horde, possibly as part of the practice of atalykism, arrived in Kabardia with a Tatar force and began a campaign against Mirza. Although the manuscript does not provide an exact date for these events, modern historians generally place them around 1491–1492.

AS 3313 further records that the Kabardian princes eventually reached an agreement under which the country was divided between the two rivals, with one half assigned to Mirza and the other to Talostan. However, Talostan later rejected the arrangement and seized control over all of Kabardia after killing the “young” Mirza.

== Sources ==
- Druzhinina, Inga A.; Iliushina, Milana Yu; Kabardov, Inal B. (2024-12-23). "NOBILITY AND POWER IN 15TH-CENTURY KABARDA ACCORDING TO THE SOURCE "PRECIOUS NECKLACES CONCERNING MERITS OF THE STATE OF AL-ASHRAF AL-GHAWRI"". History, Archeology and Ethnography of the Caucasus (in Russian). 20 (4). doi:10.32653/CH204772-782. ISSN 2618-849X.
- Druzhinina, I. A. (2024). Chkhaidze, V. N. (ed.). ByzantinoCaucasica. Выпуск 4 Поход шейха Хайдара на Северный Кавказ 1486 г. и два раздела Кабарды [Sheikh Haydar's Campaign to the North Caucasus in 1486 and Two Divisions of Kabarda] (in Russian). Moscow: Institute of Oriental Studies RAS. ISBN 978-5-907845-12-1.
