= Sultan Larsinsky =

Ingush prince from 16th century

Owner of Lars (Note: In the sources, he was mentioned as 'owner' (Russian: владелец, romanized: vladelets) which in old Russian was equivalent to a prince or murza.)
- Reign: 1580s — 1597~1600
- Born: 16th century
- Died: 1597–1600 (Note: Russian reports mention Sultan Larsinsky as taking place in the Daryal campaign (1596–1597), sources also mention that at the start of the 17th century, after Sultan's death, the Darial Gorge became "really dangerous", placing his death roughly between 1597 and 1600.)
- Religion: Islam

Sultan Larsinsky, (died at end of 16th century) also called Sultan-murza (Note: Ingush: Солтмарз, romanized: Soltmarz; Russian: Султан-Мурза/Салтан-Мурза.) or Prince Sultan in Russian sources was an Ingush feudal lord who controlled the Darial Gorge and the village located in it, Lars. In 1589, he swore allegiance to the Russian Tsar Feodor I as part of the Georgian embassy, therefore becoming subordinated to the Tsardom of Russia.

== Biography ==
=== Identity ===
Based on the assertion that Sultan-Murza called Shikh Murza "brother", historians like Nataliya Volkova concluded that he was of Vainakh stock, in this case, of Ingush stock as until the 18th century, the Darial Gorge was inhabited by the Ingush. Number of other historians also mentioned him as Ingush. In other words, Sultan-Murza was a representative of the ethnic group referred in the Old Russian sources as the Kalkans (Ghalghai).

The exact society Sultan is from was not established, however he is a representative of the Dzherakh society. Ingush ethnographer Chakh Akhriev heavily correlates Sultan-murza with the legendary Ingush noble Larsin mentioned in folklore. Local toponymy attributes the naming of the Lars settlement directly to Prince Larsin.

=== Appearance in the Russian Reports ===
After Shikh-Murza Okotsky received different gifts like a royal charter, Sultan-Murza requested Russian citizenship from Russian officials. The village of Lars had a strategic position, controlling an important section of the road in the Darial Gorge. Sultan-Murza, motivating his desire to enter into Russian citizenship, stated: "I want to serve the sovereign in my own way death, as my brother Shikh-Murza Okotsky." The fact that Sultan-murza called Shikh-murza Okotsky his "brother" was noted by the Soviet researcher E. N. Kusheva, but she did not come to literal conclusions, and therefore writes:

Let me remind you that in the article list of Prince S. Zvenigorodsky, Saltan-murza calls Shikh-murza Okotsky his brother. The Nakh origin of Saltan-murza and the population of Lars of that period has been proven in historical science and does not need an argument in the form of a conditional assumption about his “blood ties” with Shikh-murza.

Taking this circumstance into account, E. N. Kusheva introduces this turn of speech precisely as a feudal "brotherhood". Calling another feudal lord of equal status a brother was common practice in that era; even feuding kings called each other brothers. Therefore, Sultan-murza speaks of brotherhood to emphasize that his own status is higher than other nobles of Caucasus, and that he is instead a ruler like Shikh-Murza.

In 1589, Sultan-Murza swore allegiance to the Russian Tsar Feodor I as part of the Georgian embassy sent to Moscow. His position was very difficult in region as he was in middle of the most important point in military and trade relations. Therefore, he was (mainly) pressed by lowland feudal lords of Tarki Shamkhalate and Kabardia who had superior military force.

=== War with Kabardians ===
In 1596, Kabardian forces under Sholokh Tepsaruqo and Aytech Qanshau advanced through the Darial Gorge, attacking settlements and positions along the strategic mountain route. Among the local rulers affected was Sultan Murza, as his domain lay directly within the path of the campaign. the Kabardian forces moved through the gorge, control over the Lars area was disrupted and Sultan-Murza's position in the region was weakened amid the broader struggle for influence over the passage between the North Caucasus and Georgia.

=== Death ===
The Moscow ambassadors departed for Georgia along a hazardous mountain route. From there, they sent a messenger to Terek town requesting that the local governors provide an escort to the village of Lars, but no response was received. On their return journey through the Darial Gorge, the embassy unexpectedly clashed with the "Kalkans". Contemporary accounts that describe these events do not explicitly mention Sultan Larsinsky, leaving his direct role uncertain. It is therefore unclear whether he personally violated his obligations or whether the incident unfolded independently of his authority.

However, within the broader political context of the period, it is often interpreted that Sultan Murza was killed by anti-Russian factions operating in the region. These groups, opposed to the strengthening of Russian diplomatic and political influence in the North Caucasus, are believed to have targeted local leaders perceived as cooperating with Moscow. In this interpretation, the clash was not merely an isolated skirmish but part of a wider campaign of intimidation and removal of pro-Russian figures. Accordingly, Sultan Larsinsky is presented as having been assassinated or executed by hostile anti-Russian nobles, rather than falling in a simple battlefield encounter or acting independently.

== Bibliography ==
=== Russian sources ===
- Aliev, B. G.; Mirzabekov, M. Ya. (2021). "Об этнической идентификации ококов и Ших-Мурзы Окоцкого". Vestnik Dagestanskogo nauchnogo tsentra (in Russian). No. 83. Makhachkala: In-t istorii, arkheologii, etnografii DFITS RAN. pp. 17–24. doi:10.31029/vestdnc83/3.
- Dolgieva, M. B.; Kartoev, M. M.; Kodzoev, N. D.; Matiev, T. Kh. (2013). Kodzoev, N. D.; et al. (eds.). История Ингушетии [History of Ingushetia] (4th ed.). Rostov-Na-Donu: Yuzhnyy izdatelsky dom. pp. 1–600. ISBN 978-5-98864-056-1.
- Dolgieva, M. B.; Arapkhanova, L. Y.; Yandieva, U. T. (2020). "Ингушетия в контексте внешней и внутренней политики России в XVI-XXI вв.." [Ingushetia in the context of Russian foreign and domestic policy in the 16th-21st centuries]. 250 лет единения Ингушетии с Россией: Время, события, люди: Сборник научных статей по материалам международной научно-практической конференции. Магас, 2020 [250 years of unity of Ingushetia with Russia: Time, events, people: Collection of scientific articles based on materials from the international scientific and practical conference. Magas, 2020] (in Russian). Nazran: Kep. pp. 23–30.
- Gutnov, F. Kh. (2005). "Россия и Центральный Кавказ в XVI—XVII вв." [Russia and the Central Caucasus in the XVI—XVII centuries]. Daryal (in Russian) (4).
- Magomadova, T.; Litvinenko, V. (2008). "России служит хочу..." [I want to serve Russia..]. In Vinogradov, V. B.; Lukash, S. N. (eds.). Приязни добрые плоды [Sympathize good fruits] (PDF) (in Russian) (2nd ed.). Armariv: Armavirsky gos. ped. un-t. pp. 12–16. ISBN 978-5-93750-190-5.
- Narochnitsky, A. L.; et al., eds. (1988). История народов Северного Кавказа (конец XVIII в. — 1917 г.) [History of the peoples of the North Caucasus (late 18th century - 1917)] (in Russian). Moskva: Nauka. pp. 1–659. ISBN 5-02-009408-0.
- Sampiev, I. (2014). "Аккинцы в Дарьяле и Армхинском Ущелье: Деконструкция Исторического Мифа" [Akkins in Darial and Armkhi Gorge: Deconstruction of the Historical Myth]. Kavkaz & Globalizatsiya (in Russian). 8 (3–4): 85–97.
- Vinogradov, V. B.; Magomadova, T. S. (1981). "Две заметки о ранних русско-северокавказских связях" [Two Notes on Early Russo-North Caucasian Relations]. In Magometov, A. K.; Isaenko, A. V.; Totoev, F. V. (eds.). История, этнография и культура народов Северного Кавказа: межвузовский сборник статей [History, ethnography and culture of the peoples of the North Caucasus: interuniversity collection of articles] (in Russian). Vladikavkaz: Severo-Oset. gos. un-t im. K. L. Khetagurova; kn. tip. Goskomizdata SOASSR. pp. 45–57.
