= Alkhas Jamirza =

Prince of Jilakhstaney
- Predecessor: Jamirza Jilakhstan
- Successor: Mudar Alkhas
- Born: 15th century Kabardia
- Died: 16th century Kabardia
- Spouse: Kalghasha
- Issue: Sons: Mudar; Pyshta; Surkay; Araskhan; Daughters: Babasupkh; Unnamed second daughter
Names
- Alkhas, son of Jamirza
- Kabardian: Жамырзэ и къуэ Алкъэс
- House: Inalid dynasty; House of Jilakhstan
- Father: Jamirza Jilakhstan

Alkhas Jamirza (Kabardian: Жамырзэ Алкъэс) was a Kabardian prince of the Jilakhstan family who was active in the late 16th century. He was one of the most powerful feudal lords in the North Caucasus, with holdings situated along the route between Astrakhan and Georgia. Alkhas maintained extensive diplomatic relations with the Russian state and Kakheti, escorting diplomatic missions between the two regions. He also maintained close ties with Safavid Iran, including through the marriage of one of his daughters to Shah Abbas I. During the Kabardian civil war of 1589, Alkhas allied himself with Sholokh, but the two were defeated.

== Biography ==
Alkhas was a Kabardian prince of the Jilakhstan family and the grandson of its founder, Jilakhstan.

=== Relations with Moscow ===
In October 1588, Alkhas sent his ambassador Aslanbech to Moscow. The Russian government regarded maintaining ties with Sholokh and Alkhas as desirable, as their appanages lay along the route to Georgia.

In 1589, the Russian government issued royal charters concerning the passage of the Russian ambassador to Georgia, S. G. Zvenigorodsky, through the territories of Sholokh and Alkhas. However, neither Sholokh nor Alkhas accompanied the tsar's ambassadors.

Further letters from 1589 addressed to the two princes requested that they escort Zvenigorodsky's embassy to Georgia. Sholokh and Alkhas refused, displeasing the Russian government. The Ambassadorial Prikaz subsequently issued a rescript to the Terek voivode A. I. Khvorostinin requesting that servicemen be dispatched against Prince Sholokh. In September, Mamstruk Temruqo made the same request.

=== Relations with Georgia and Iran ===
Alkhas was one of the most powerful feudal lords in the North Caucasus. His holdings were situated along the route from Astrakhan to Georgia, giving him considerable influence over affairs in the North Caucasus. In foreign policy, he frequently supported Georgia, as his sister was the mother of Alexander II of Kakheti.

In 1586–1587 and 1589–1590, Alkhas sent his own envoys to the Russian tsar alongside Georgian ambassadors. He escorted these embassies through the North Caucasus to Astrakhan and provided them with protection. In subsequent years, he likewise escorted Russian embassies passing through his territories to Georgia.

Alkhas played a significant role in the development of Russian-Georgian and Russian-North Caucasian relations. He was also one of the few Kabardian princes whose foreign policy was oriented toward Iran. One of his daughters married Shah Abbas I (1587–1629). His policy toward Iran was also influenced by his close relations with neighboring rulers, including the Shamkhal and other Dagestani rulers, who maintained close ties with Iran.

=== Relations with other Kabardian princes ===
Alkhas also had close ties with the Idarov family through his son-in-law, Qudenet Qambolet, who was married to his daughter Babasupkh.

By 1589, the princes of Lesser Kabardia began to suspend their rapprochement with Moscow. Among them were Sholokh and Alkhas, who was his ally.

Following the death of Aslanbech I in July 1589, a new civil conflict broke out in Kabardia. Alkhas supported Sholokh, but the two were defeated.

== Sources ==
- Kardanov, Ch. E. (2016). Князья Кабарды [Princes of Kabarda] (in Russian). Nalchik: Izdatel'stvo M. i V. Kotlyarovykh. ISBN 978-5-93680-971-2.
