= House of Talostan =

Circassian princely house

House of Talostan Талъостэн (Kabardian)
- Circassian princely house

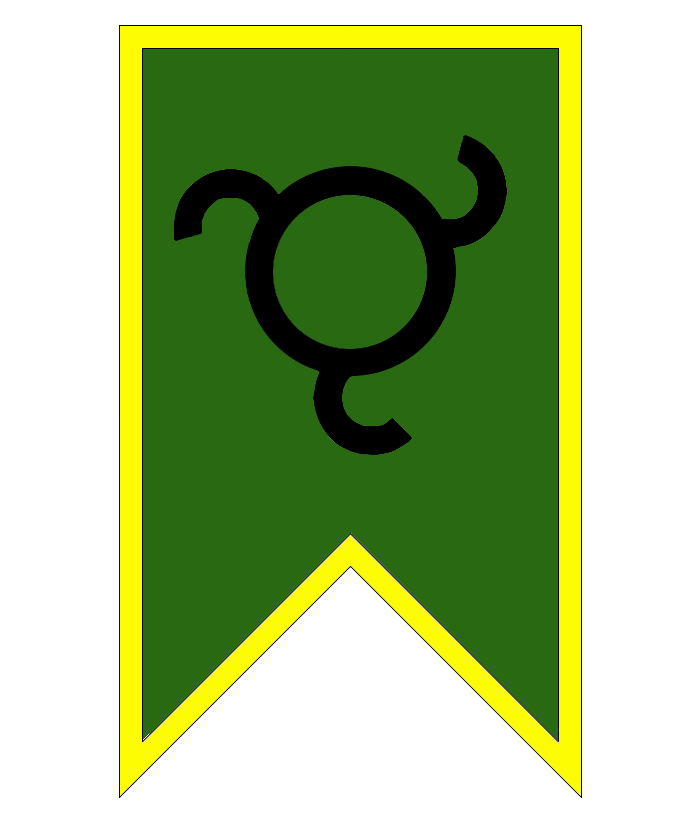
- Country: (formerly); Circassia (formerly); Russian Empire (formerly); Mountainous Republic of the Northern Caucasus (formerly); Soviet Union (formerly); Confederation of Mountain Peoples of the Caucasus (formerly); Russia; Turkey
- Origin: Kabardia, Circassia (present-day Kabardino-Balkaria, Russia)
- Traditions: Khabzeism; Orthodox Christianity; Sunni Islam

House of Talostan (Note: also referred to as Talustan or Talustand.) (Note: Kabardian: Талъостэн, romanized: Tatlosten; Russian: Талостанов, romanized: Talostanov) is a Circassian princely house of Kabardia of Circassia. They are found in Kabardino-Balkaria, Russian Federation; as well as in Republic of Turkey due to the Circassian genocide.

== Notable members ==
- Bidar Kadın
- Talostan of Kabardia
- Sholokh I of Kabardia

== Images ==
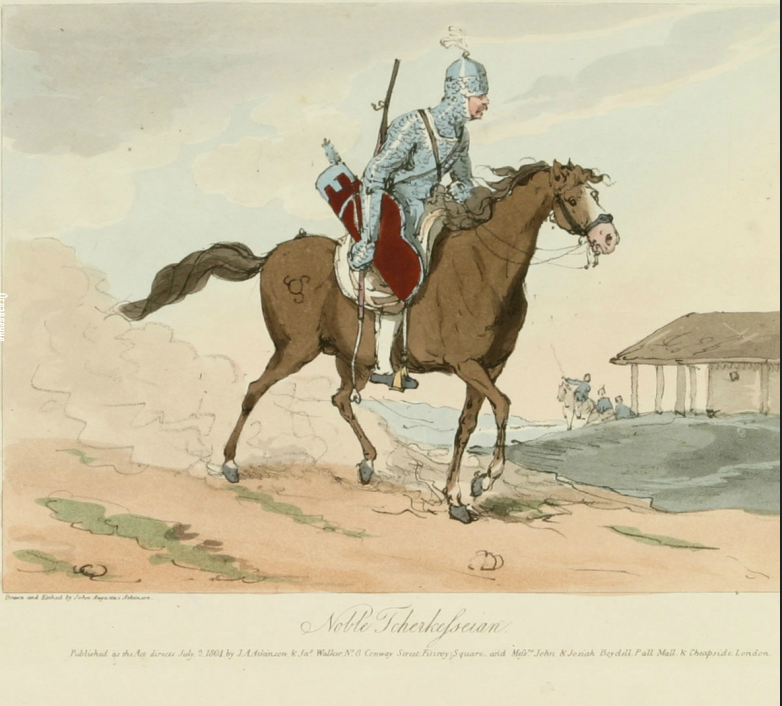
A Noble Tscherkesseian
