= Jilakhstan of Kabardia =

Jilakhstan Minbolet

Grand Prince of Kabardia (disputed)
- Reign: c. 1480s–1491
- Predecessor: Qeytuqo Jankhot
- Successor: Mirza Jilakhstan

Prince of the Principality of Jilakhstaney
- Reign: c. 15th century – 1550s
- Predecessor: Office established
- Successor: Seizure of lands by Temruqo Idar
- Born: Unknown
- Died: 1491 (per AS 3313); 1550s (oral history); Kabardia
- Issue: Jamirza; Laversan; Qanshau; Tagata Mirza
Names
- Jilakhstan, son of Minbolet
- Kabardian: Минболэт и къуэ Жылахъстэн
- House: Inalid dynasty; House of Jilakhstan (Founder)
- Father: Minbolet of Kabardia
- Religion: Sunni Islam

Jilakhstan Minbolet (Kabardian: Минболэт Жылахъстэн), was a Kabardian prince associated with the late 15th-century political history of Kabardia. He was a ruler during a period of dynastic change and political restructuring within the Kabardian principalities, and his rule is linked to early processes that shaped the territorial and political organization of Kabardia in the post-unified period.

== Biography ==
=== Written sources ===
The Arabic manuscript al-'Uqūd al-Jawhariyya fī al-Mahāsin al-Dawla al-Ashrafiyya al-Ghawiyya (Precious Necklaces of the Dignities of the State of al-Ashraf al-Ghawri, abbreviated as AS 3313) records a conflict between Jilakhstan, son of Minbolet (referred to in the manuscript as Kilak-Sultan), and Qeytuqo, son of Jankhot (referred to as Kituk), which began in the 1470s.

The conflict began when Jilakhstan's brother, Bora of Kabardia, who held the title of Grand Prince of Kabardia, was killed by Qeytuqo, who subsequently seized power. This led to a struggle between Qeytuqo and Jilakhstan. According to AS 3313, Jilakhstan confronted Qeytuqo in battle and defeated him:

“He [Kituk] went, entered into battle and was defeated [by] Kilak-Sultan.”

The second phase of the conflict also took place during the 1470s. Following his defeat, Qeytuqo fled to the Great Horde, converted to Islam, and later returned to Kabardia with a Tatar force. This compelled Jilakhstan to flee the country. The manuscript states:

"Kituk went to the Tatars, accepted Islam from them, and came with the Tatars. Kilak Sultan fled from them."

The third phase of the conflict concerned Jilakhstan's efforts to secure external support in order to regain power. AS 3313 states that after Qeytuqo's return with the Tatars, Jilakhstan fled to Shirvan, whose ruler, Farrukh Yasar, a vassal of Aq Qoyunlu, sent him to Tabriz to meet the Aq Qoyunlu ruler Yaqub. Since Yaqub ascended the throne in 1478, this date serves as the terminus post quem for these events.

Despite receiving a favorable reception, Jilakhstan failed to obtain military assistance from Yaqub. According to AS 3313, this was because Qeytuqo had sent Yaqub a girl identified as the daughter of his paternal uncle, Qeban, son of Qirqilish. Jilakhstan's subsequent dealings with Farrukh Yasar proved more successful. After converting to Islam in Shirvan, he was granted three thousand horsemen. With this force, Jilakhstan returned to Kabardia, and Qeytuqo fled upon his arrival.

In 1486, during the campaign of Sheikh Haydar against Circassia, the lands of the Kabardians were devastated. In response, the council of elders decided to divide Kabardia into two appanages, one ruled by Qeytuqo and the other by Jilakhstan. The description of these events in AS 3313 is followed by an account of the marriage between Jilakhstan and Qeytuqo's mother, although the precise date of this marriage is unclear. The manuscript then records the murder of Qeytuqo, after which Jilakhstan gained control of the whole of Kabardia.

Jilakhstan retained power until his death and was succeeded by his young son, Mirza the Young. AS 3313 does not provide a date for Jilakhstan's death, but a comparison of the Arabic manuscript with late fifteenth-century Russian diplomatic records suggests that it most likely occurred around 1491.

=== Oral history ===
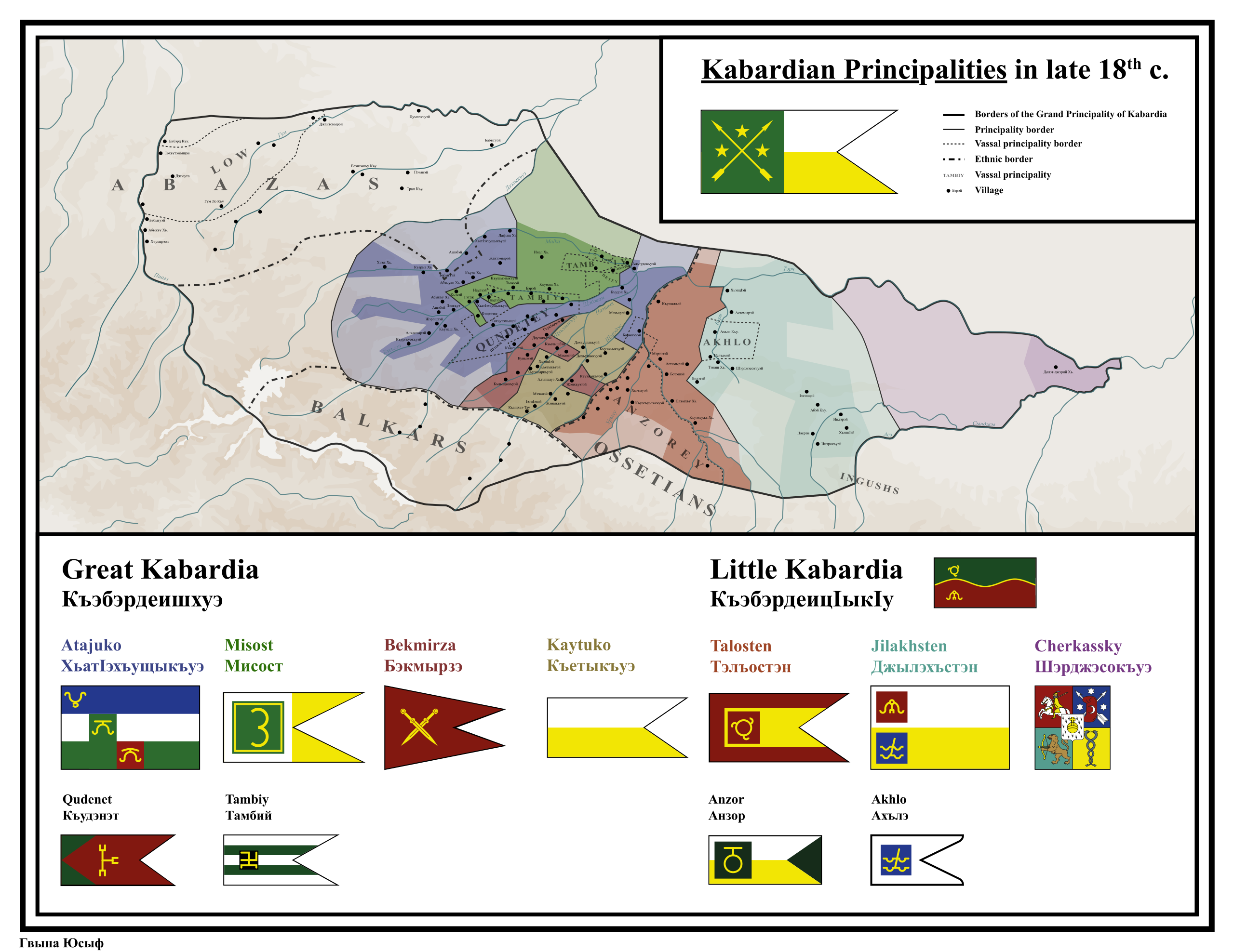
Map of Kabardia in 18th century showing Talostaney and Jilakhstaney

According to the tradition, Kabardia was once a single political entity, with its division placed by some narratives in the 13th–15th centuries, during the Christian period. In one legend, two brothers, Jilakhstan and Beslan, agreed to divide their possessions in order to rule independently: the elder (Beslan) remained in Baksan, while the younger (Jilakhstan) established his residence along the Terek. Talostan, who had strained relations with his brothers and to have moved frequently across the North Caucasus. After returning to Kabardia in a position described as unfavorable, organized repeated raids on their territories, taking livestock and captives. In response, an agreement among the elders forced concessions from Jilakhstan, whose lands were more exposed to incursions. Following this settlement, the territory to the left of the Terek became known as Talostaney.

In the early 16th century, Temruqo the Brave entered into conflict with the sons of Qeytuqo, including Aslanbech and Pshiapshoqo Qeytuqo. As a result of this struggle, Temruqo was forced to migrate with his family to Lesser Kabardia. After the death of Prince Jilakhstan in the 1550s, Temruqo became the senior prince of Lesser Kabardia, and the territory under his control became known as “Idarey”.

== Family ==
Russian genealogies attribute four sons to Jilakhstan, although very little is known about them from either the Russian sources or oral accounts:

- Jamirza
- Laversan
- Qanshau
- Tagata

By contrast, AS 3313 identifies another son, Mirza, who succeeded Jilakhstan as ruler of Kabardia following his father's death.

== Sources ==
- Druzhinina, Inga A.; Iliushina, Milana Yu; Kabardov, Inal B. (2024-12-23). "NOBILITY AND POWER IN 15TH-CENTURY KABARDA ACCORDING TO THE SOURCE "PRECIOUS NECKLACES CONCERNING MERITS OF THE STATE OF AL-ASHRAF AL-GHAWRI"". History, Archeology and Ethnography of the Caucasus (in Russian). 20 (4). doi:10.32653/CH204772-782. ISSN 2618-849X.
- Druzhinina, I. A. (2024). Chkhaidze, V. N. (ed.). ByzantinoCaucasica. Выпуск 4 Поход шейха Хайдара на Северный Кавказ 1486 г. и два раздела Кабарды [Sheikh Haydar's Campaign to the North Caucasus in 1486 and Two Divisions of Kabarda] (in Russian). Moscow: Institute of Oriental Studies RAS. ISBN 978-5-907845-12-1.
