= Sioni (townlet) =

Sioni სიონი
- Townlet
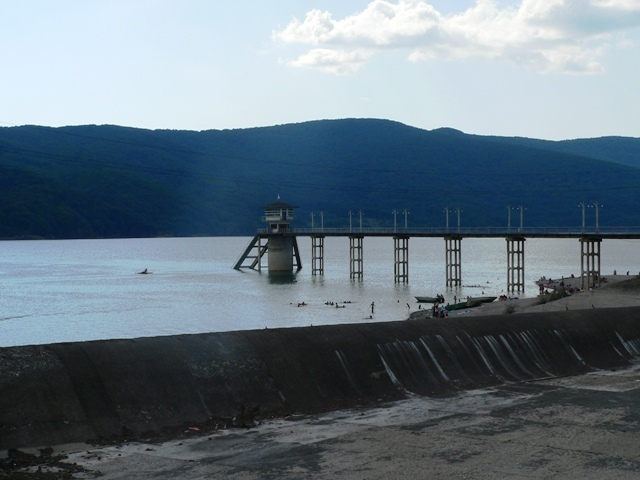

- Location of Dusheti in Georgia Sioni (Mtskheta-Mtianeti)
- Coordinates: 41°59′22″N 45°1′30″E
- Country: Georgia
- Mkhare: Mtskheta-Mtianeti
- Municipality: Tianeti
- Elevation: 1,000 m (3,300 ft)

Population (2014)
  - Total: 371
- Time zone: UTC+4 (Georgian Time)

Sioni (Georgian: სიონი) is a townlet in Georgia, the part of Tianeti Municipality, in the Mtskheta-Mtianeti region. Located 80 km (50 mi) from the Tbilisi railway station, it arose in 1951 during the construction of the Sioni reservoir. Sioni obtained status of a townlet in 1960. Until the 1970s, it was called Sionmsheni.

== Geography ==
Sioni is located in the Ivri River valley, on the banks of the Sioni Reservoir, 32 kilometers from Tianeti.

== History ==
Before the creation of the Sioni Reservoir, there was a basilica dating from the second half of the 5th century, and several medieval monuments were located in the surrounding area. A large part of these was submerged, and the basilica was dismantled and moved to the Folklore and Architecture Museum in Tbilisi.
