= List of people known as the Great =

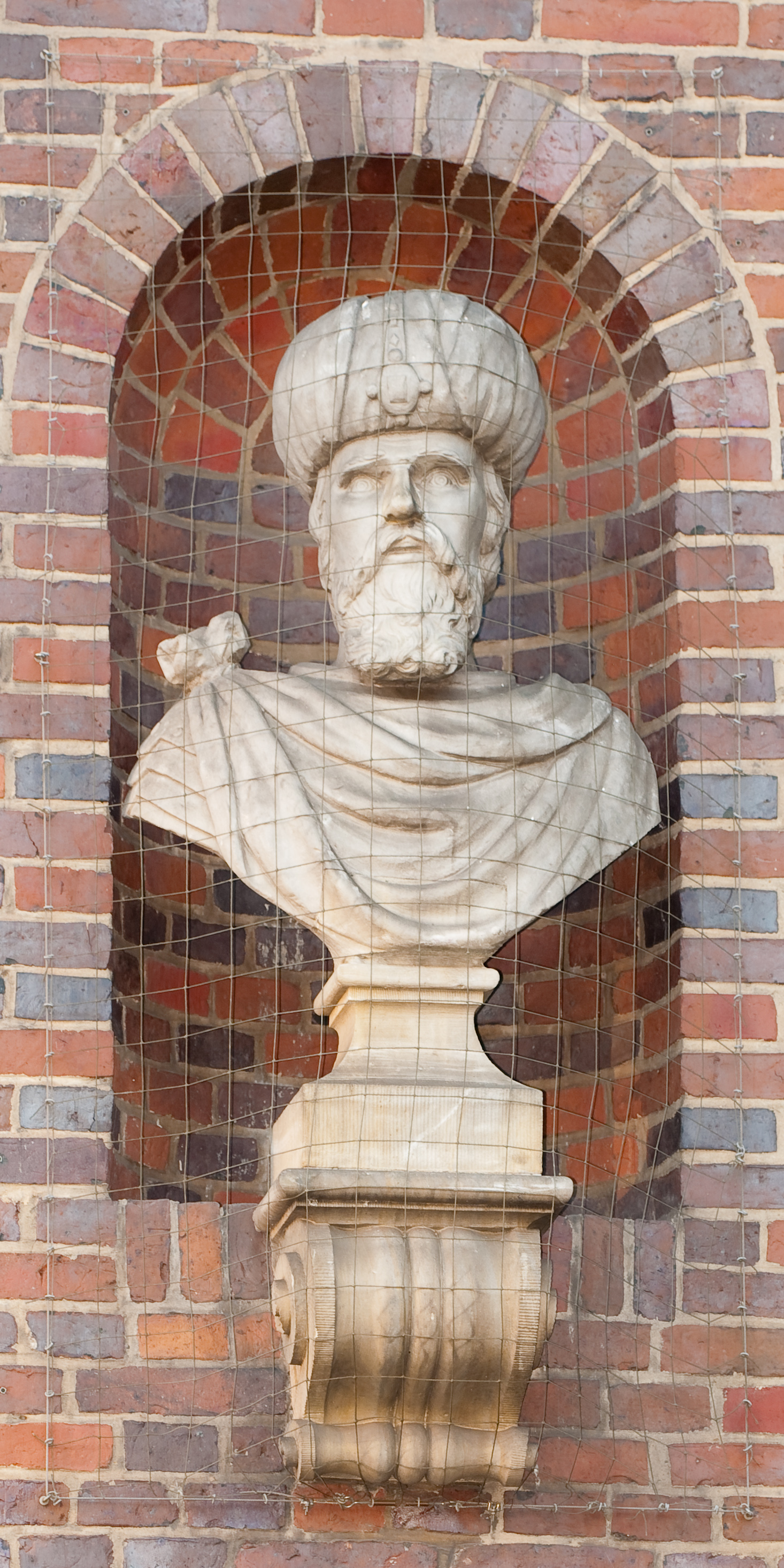
Cyrus II of Persia, first to use the title of "Great"

This is a list of people known as the Great, or the equivalent, in their own language. Other languages have their own suffixes, such as Persian e Bozorg and Hindustani e Azam.

In Persia, the title "the Great" at first seems to have been a colloquial version of the Old Persian title "Great King" (King of Kings, Shahanshah). It was first used by Cyrus II of Persia. The title was inherited by Alexander III when he conquered the Persian Empire, and the epithet eventually became personally associated with him. The first reference to this is in a comedy by Plautus, in which it is assumed that everyone knew who "Alexander the Great" was; however, there is no evidence that he was called "the Great" before this. The early Seleucid kings, who succeeded Alexander in Persia, used "Great King" in local documents, but the title was most notably used for Antiochus III. Once the term gained currency, it was broadened to include persons in other fields, such as the philosopher Albertus.

Later rulers and commanders were given the epithet during their lifetime, for example, the Roman general Pompey. Others received the title posthumously, such as the Indian emperor Ashoka. As there are no objective criteria for "greatness", the persistence of the designation varies greatly. For example, Louis XIV of France was often referred to as "the Great" in his lifetime, but is rarely called such nowadays, later writers preferring his more specific epithet "the Sun King". German Emperor Wilhelm I was often called "the Great" in the time of his grandson Wilhelm II, but rarely before or after.

== Monarchs ==
Name	Description	Dates	Ref.
Abdullah Khan II	Khan of Shaybanids	1533 – 1598	
Abbas I	Shah of Iran	1587 – 1629	
Abgar VIII	King of Osroene	177 – 212	
Akbar	Emperor of Mughal	1556 – 1605	
Alan I	Duke of Brittany	876 – 907	
Alexander I	King of Georgia	1412 – 1442	
Alexander III	King of Macedon	336 BC – 323 BC	
Alfonso III	King of León, Galicia and Asturias	866 – 910	
Alfred	King of Wessex	871 – 899	
Amenhotep III	Pharaoh of Egypt	1391 BC – 1353 BC or 1388 BC – 1351 BC	
Ali	King of Songhai	1464 – 1492	
Antiochus III	King of the Seleucid Empire	223 BC – 187 BC	
Ashoka	Emperor of Maurya	268 BC – 232 BC	
Ashot I	King of Armenia	885 – 890	
Ashot I	King of Iberia	813 – 826 or 830	
Aslanbech II	Grand Prince of Kabardia	1737–1746	
Bagrat V	King of Georgia	1360 – 1393	
Berengaria	Queen of Castile and Toledo	1197 – 1246	
Bhillama I	King of Seuna	910 – 930	
Bolesław I	King of Poland	992 – 1025	
Borommaracha IV	King of Thonburi	1767 – 1782	
Casimir III	King of Poland	1333 – 1370	
Catherine II	Empress of Russia	1762 – 1796	
Charles I	King of the Franks and Emperor of the Romans	768 – 814	
Chʼeen II	King of Kaan	636 – 686	
Cnut	King of England, Denmark and Norway	1016 – 1035	
Constantine I	Emperor of Rome	306 – 337	
Cyrus II	Shahanshah of the Achaemenid Empire	559 BC – 530 BC	
Darius I	Shahanshah of the Achaemenid Empire	522 BC – 486 BC	
Eucratides I	King of Bactria and Yavana	171 BC – 145 BC	
Ewuare I	King of Benin	1440 – 1473	
Farrukhan	Chief of Tabaristan	712 – 728	
Ferdinand I	King of León and Count of Castile	1037 – 1065	
Frederick II	King of Prussia	1740 – 1786	
Gustav II	King of Sweden	1611 – 1632	
Gwanggaeto	King of Goguryeo	391 – 412	
Gwrgan	King of Ergyng	619 – 645	
Henry IV	King of France and Navarre	1589 – 1610	
Herod I	King of Judea	37 BC – 4 BC or 36 BC – 1 BC	
Hugh	Co-king of France	1017 – 1025	
Hugh III	King of Cyprus and Jerusalem	1267 – 1284	
Inal	Supreme Prince of Circassia	1427 – 1453	
Ivan III	Grand Prince of Moscow and All-Russia	1462 – 1505	
Iyasu I	Emperor of Ethiopia	1682 – 1706	
John II	King of Aragon and Navarre	1458 – 1479	
Justinian I	Emperor of Eastern Rome	527 – 565	
Kamehameha I	King of Hawaii	1782 – 1819	
Kanishka I	Emperor of Kushan	127 – 150	
Krešimir II	King of Croatia	949 – 969	
Kvirike III	King of Kakheti-Hereti	1010 – 1037	
Leo I	Emperor of Eastern Rome	457 – 474	
Llywelyn	King of Gwynedd	1195 – 1240	
Louis I	King of Hungary, Croatia, and Poland	1342 – 1382	
Louis XIV	King of France and Navarre	1643 – 1715	
Misost II	Grand Prince of Kabardia	1785 – 1788	
Mardavij	King of the Ziyarids	930 – 935	
Marianus IV	Judge of Arborea	1347 – 1376	
Miloš I	Prince of Serbia	1817 – 1839, 1858 – 1860	
Mithridates I	King of the Parthian Empire	165 BC – 132 BC	
Mithridates II	King of the Parthian Empire	124 BC – 91 BC	
Mithridates VI Eupator	King of Pontus	120 BC – 63 BC	
Mstislav I	Grand Prince of Kiev	1088 – 1132	
Mubarak	Sheikh of Kuwait	1896 – 1915	
Muhammad I	King of Songhai	1493 – 1528	
Nebuchadnezzar II	King of Babylon	605 BC – 562 BC	
Otto I	Emperor of the Romans	962 – 973	
Pakal I	King of Palenque	615 – 683	
Parakramabahu I	King of Polonnaruwa	1153 – 1186	
Peter I	Emperor of Russia	1682 – 1725	
Peter III	King of Aragon and Sicily	1276 – 1285	
Pharasmanes I	King of Iberia	1 – 58	
Radama I	King of Madagascar	1810 – 1828	
Radu IV	Prince of Wallachia	1495 – 1508	
Rajendra I	Emperor of Chola	1014 – 1044	
Rama I	King of Siam	1782 – 1809	
Rama IV	King of Siam	1851 – 1868	
Rama IX	King of Thailand	1946 – 2016	
Rama V	King of Siam	1868 – 1910	
Ramathibodi III	King of Ayutthaya	1656 – 1688	
Ramesses II	Pharaoh of Egypt	1279 BC – 1213 BC	
Ramkhamhaeng	King of Sukhothai	1279 – 1298	
Reza	Shah of Iran	1925 – 1941	
Rhodri	King of Gwynedd	844 – 878	
Roman	Grand Prince of Kiev	1168 – 1205	
Sancho III	King of Navarre	1004 – 1035	
Sanphet II	King of Ayutthaya	1590 – 1605	
Sargon	King of Akkad	2334 BC – 2279 BC	
Sejong	King of Joseon	1418 – 1450	
Shahi	Sultan of Kashmir	1418 – 1419, 1420 – 1470	
Shapur II	Shahanshah of the Sasanian Empire	309 – 379	
Simeon I	Emperor of Bulgaria	893 – 927	
Simon I	King of Kartli	1556 – 1569, 1578 – 1600	
Solomon I	King of Imereti	1752 – 1765, 1767 – 1784	
Stefan Uroš I	King of Serbia	1243 – 1276	
Stephen III	Prince of Moldavia	1457 – 1504	
Svatopluk I	King of Moravia	867 – 894	
Tamar	Queen of Georgia	1184 – 1213	
Theodoric	King of the Ostrogoths, Regent of the Visigoths and Viceroy of Byzantine	471 – 526	
Theodosius I	Emperor of Rome	379 – 395	
Thoros II	Lord of Cilicia	1144 or 1145 – 1169	
Thutmose III	Pharaoh of Egypt	1479 BC – 1425 BC	
Tigranes II	Emperor of Armenia	95 BC – 55 BC	
Tiridates III	King of Armenia	298 – 330	
Valdemar I	King of Denmark	1154 – 1182	
Valentinian I	Emperor of Rome	364 – 375	
Vigraharaja IV	King of Chauhan	1150 – 1164	
Vladimir I	Prince of Novgorod, Grand Prince of Kiev	970 – 1015	
Vytautas	Grand Duke of Lithuania	1392 – 1430	
Wilhelm I	Emperor of Germany	1871 – 1888	
Xerxes I	Shahanshah of the Achaemenid Empire	486 BC – 465 BC	
Zayed	Sheikh of Abu Dhabi	1855 – 1909	
Qizbech	Prince of Besleney	c. 1780s–1790s	

== Aristocrats ==
Name	Description	Dates	Ref.
Alain I	Lord of Albret	1440 – 1522	
Amadeus V	Count of Savoy	1249 – 1323	
Arnulf I	Count of Flanders	893 – 964	
Atenulf I	Prince of Capua	? – c. 910	
Barnim III	Duke of Stettin Pomerania	1344 – 1368	
Bogislaw X	Duke of Pomerania	1454 – 1523	
Bogusław V	Duke of Wolgast and Słupsk	1326 – 1374	
Bruno	Archbishop of Cologne and Duke of Lotharingia	925 – 965	
Charles Emmanuel I	Duke of Savoy	1562 – 1630	
Charles III	Duke of Lotharingia	1543 – 1608	
Conrad I	Margrave of Meissen	1097 – 1157	
David III	Prince of Tao	966 – 1001	
Frederick II	Duke of Legnica, Brzeg, Wołów, Głogów, and Ziębice	1488 – 1547	
Frederick William	Duke of Prussia	1620 – 1688	
Gerhard III	Count of Holstein-Rendsburg	1292 – 1340	
Gero I	Ruler of Gero	900 – 965	
Godfrey I	Count of Brussels and Leuven, Duke of Lower Lorraine, Langrave of Brabant	1060 – 1139	
Gothelo I	Duke of Lotharingia, Count of Verdun, and Margrave of Antwerp	967 – 1044	
Gurgen II	Prince of Tao	918 – 941	
Hanno I	Carthaginian politician and military leader	4th century BC	
Hanno II	Carthaginian aristocrat, general, and politician	3rd century BC	
Hanno III	Carthaginian politician	2nd century BC	
Henry I	Duke of Burgundy	946 – 1002	
Henry V	Count of Luxembourg	1216 – 1281	
Hugh	Count of Paris and Duke of the Franks	898 – 956	
Hugh	Count of Vermandois	1057 – 1101	
Hugh	Margrave of Tuscany	953 or 954 – 1001	
Humphrey I	Baron of Trowbridge	? – 1123	
Intef	Nomarch of Thebes	? – c. 2135 BC	
Matthew II	Lord of Montmorency	1189 – 1230	
Maximilian I	Duke of Bavaria	1573 – 1651	
Milo I	Lord of Montlhéry	1095 – 1102	
Odo	Duke of Aquitaine	? – 735	
Ralph IV	Count of Valois, Bar-sur-Aube, Vexin, Vitry, Amiens, Montdidier and Tardenois	1025 – 1074	
Ramon Berenguer III	Count of Barcelona, Provence, and various other counties	1082 – 1131	
Robert I	Count of Dreux	1123 – 1188	
Roger	Earl of Shrewsbury and Arundel	? – 1094	
Roger Bernard II	Count of Foix	1223 – 1241	
Roger II	Count of Sicily	c. 1030 – 1101	
Świętopełk II	Duke of Pomerania	? – 1266	
Theobald II	Count of Champagne and Brie	1090 – 1151	
William I	Count of Burgundy and Mâcon	1020 – 1087	
William V	Duke of Aquitaine, Count of Poitou	969 – 1030	

== Military ==
Name	Description	Dates	Ref.
Afonso	Portuguese general, statesman and empire builder	1453 – 1515	
Melias	Byzantine general of Armenian origin	890 – 934	
Pompey	Military and political leader of Rome	106 BC – 48 BC	
Prokop	Hussite general in Bohemia	1380 – 1434	

== Religious figures ==
=== Christian ===
Name	Description	Dates	Ref.
Abraham	Monk and saint of the Church of the East	492 – 586	
Albertus	Medieval German philosopher and theologian	1193 or 1206 – 1280	
Anthony	Early Christian saint of Egypt	251 – 356	
Arsenius	Roman anchorite saint in Egypt	354 – 445	
Athanasius	Early Christian saint and bishop of Alexandria	296 – 373	
Babai	Assyrian church leader	551 – 628	
Basil	Greek bishop and theologian	330 – 379	
Bertin	Frankish Abbot of a namesake monastery	615 – 709	
Dioscorus I	Coptic Orthodox Church pope	? – 454	
Euthymius	Abbot and Roman Catholic and Eastern Orthodox saint	377 – 473	
Gertrude	German Benedictine, mystic, theologian and Roman Catholic saint	1256 – 1302	
Gregory I	Catholic pope	540 – 604	
Hilarion	Ancient Roman anchorite and Orthodox and Catholic saint	291 – 371	
Hugh	Abbot of Cluny	1024 – 1109	
Isaac	Armenian Catholicos	354 – 439	
James (Note: In this case James is styled "the Greater" to distinguish him from the Apostle James the Lesser, with greater meaning older or taller, rather than more important.)	One of the Twelve Apostles of Jesus	3 – 44	
Joannicius	Byzantine hermit, theologian and saint	752 – 846	
Leo I	Catholic pope	391 or 400 – 461	
Macarius	Egyptian hermit	300 – 391	
Michael	Patriarch of the Syriac Orthodox Church	1126 – 1199	
Nerses I	Armenian Catholicos	? – 373	
Nicholas I	Catholic pope	800 – 867	
Photios I	Eastern Orthodox saint and Patriarch of Constantinople	810 – 893	
Shenoute	Oriental Orthodox saint and abbot of the White Monastery	348 – 465	
Sisoes	An early desert father, a solitary monk pursuing asceticism in the Egyptian desert in a cave of Anthony the Great	? – 429	
William	Founder of the Catholic congregation of Williamites	? – 1157	

=== Jewish ===
Name	Description	Dates	Ref.
Aharon I	Hasidic rabbi	1736 – 1772	
Eliezer	Rabbi in Judea	1st century	
Hiyya	Rabbi in Judea	180 – 230	

== Legendary and mythological figures ==
Name	Description	Ref.
Ajax	Greek hero in the Iliad	
Beli	In medieval Welsh mythology and literature	
Belinus	Legendary king of the Britons	
Fergus	Semi-mythical king of Dál Riata	
Gradlon	Semi-mythical king of Cornouaille	
Hayk	Legendary founder and patriarch of the Armenian nation	
Phrom	Legendary king of Yonok	
Yu	Legendary king of Xia	

== See also ==
- List of monarchs by nickname
- James Stanley, 7th Earl of Derby (1607–1651), "Yn Stanlagh Mooar" ("the Great Stanley"), also Lord of Mann
- Bantul the Great, a Bengali comic strip character
- Wayne Gretzky, former professional ice hockey player, nicknamed "The Great One" and "The Great Gretzky"
- Muhammad Ali, boxer and activist, dubbed "The Greatest"
