= Qizbech the Great =

18th-century Circassian prince

Qizbech Qanoqo
- Къанокъуэ Къызбэч
- Seal of Qizbech Qanoqo (1784)

Grand Prince of Besleney

Qizbech the Great
- In office fl. 1781 – 1792
- Preceded by: Talostan Qanoqo
- Succeeded by: Mirzabech, Aslanbech and Bechmirza Qanoqo

Personal details
- Born: Besleney, Circassia
- Died: 1792 – 1800
- Relations: Mirzabech (brother); Aslanbech (brother); Bechmirza (brother); Talostan (father)
- Parent: Talostan
- Religion: Sunni Islam
- House: Inalid dynasty; House of Qanoqo
- Nickname: The Great

Military service
- Allegiance: Circassian Confederation; Principality of Besleney; Ottoman Empire (nominal)
- Battles/wars: Caucasian War; Russo-Circassian War; Sheikh Mansur movement; Russo-Turkish War (1787–1792)

Qizbech Qanoqo (Kabardian: Къанокъуэ Талъостэн и къуэ Къызбэч), also known as the Qizbech the Great (Kabardian: Къызбэчышхуэ) was the Grand Prince of Besleney in the late 18th century.

He belonged to the Qanoqo princely house of the Besleney people. His known brothers were Bechmirza, Mirzabech and Aslanbech, all sons of Tav Sultan (Talostan). Qizbech was the maternal cousin of the wife of the prominent Kabardian prince Hatokhshoqo Hamirza, the Grand Prince of Kabardia.

== Russo-Circassian War ==
=== Intelligence and Diplomatic Missions (1781–1783) ===
By 1781, escalating Russian military pressure and the heavy losses sustained by the Kabardian aristocracy prompted urgent reports to the Ottoman government. Emissaries sent by the Besleney prince Qizbech Qanoqo and the Chemguy prince Aslanbech Boletuqo traveled to Istanbul. These agents, Hajji Ismail and Hajji Mehmed, provided detailed intelligence regarding Russian infrastructure.

In 1783, following the Russian invasion of Kabardia and the systematic suppression of its leadership, emissaries representing Qizbech Qanoqo and Aslanbech Boletuqo petitioned the Ottoman government, proposing a formal military coalition between Circassian and Chechen forces and the Ottoman state to resist the further Russian advance into the Caucasus. An Ottoman map made between 1782 and 1785 locates the residence of "Besney Mirza Kizil Bey" (Besleney prince Qizbech) at a meadow called "Farzek," 74 hours from Anapa. The Makhosh and Qizbech were also located in the "Farz" region, 68 hours from Anapa. According to the map document, the Besleney consisted of 25 villages and 3,000 households, with half of the population directly under Qizbech and his brother Bechmirza. In the document dated 17 November 1784, through which Ferah Ali Pasha received renewed allegiance and service from the Circassians and was accepted as their commander-in-chief, Qizbech's signature and seal are located in the first line, at the third position from left to right. According to a 1785 Ottoman document, Qizbech was receiving 500 kuruş as a salary.

=== The Antkhir Congress (1783) ===
In October 1783, following the Russian annexation of Crimea, a grand council was convened at the Antkhir plain (located between the Hatuqay and Zhane territories). According to Ottoman documents, leaders from the Besleney, Zhane, Bzhedug, Hatuqay, Chemguy, and Makhosh principalities participated in this congress, where they swore an oath of loyalty to the Ottoman Sultan and requested military aid against Russian incursions.

According to the memoirs of General Musa Kundukhov, who recorded the testimony of Kabardian prince Alkhas Misost Bechmirza who was in the Russian army: Qizbech was elected as the supreme leader of the Kuban Circassians. Alkhas stated that the Circassians chose him because he embodied all the traits of an ideal leader, and the population of "approximately 100,000 households" swore absolute obedience to him. It was during this period of consolidated power that he earned the epithet "the Great".

=== Accounts of Qizbech from Alkhas Misost ===
Russian authorities, wary of Qizbech's influence, sent a special envoy on behalf of Empress Catherine II with rich and expensive gifts. Qizbech refused to accept these gifts and requested the envoy to thank the Empress for her kindness. When the envoy insisted that the refusal would deeply affect the Empress and was a shameful act, Qizbech told the envoy that the gifts were superior to his entire wealth and that he had no intention of "being sold to the Russian side".

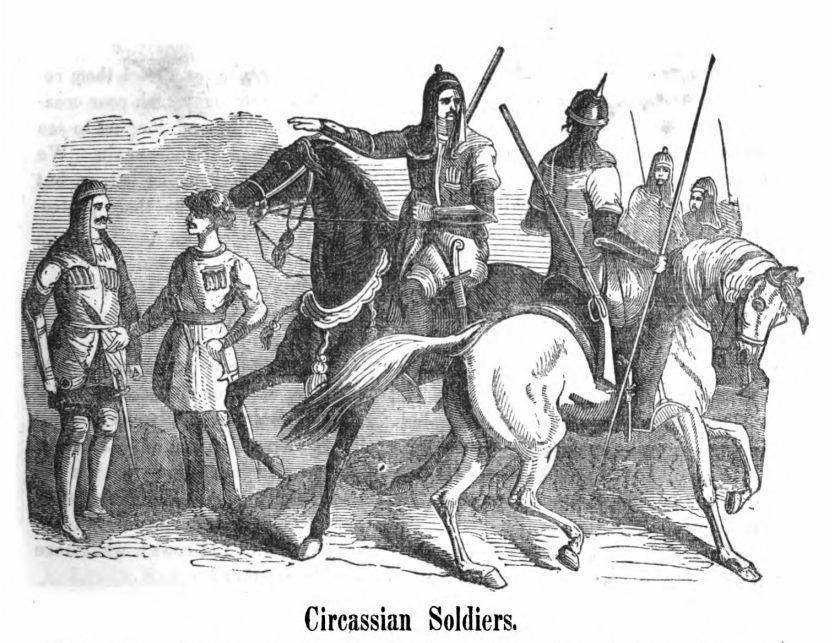
Circassian soldiers

Prince Alkhas Misost Bechmirza also recounted an event to Musa Kundukhov involving a Russian unit camped near Stavropol. The Russian commander sent out Cossack reconnaissance units every morning, which were eventually ambushed by Circassians in two locations. One wing surrendered immediately, while the other wing dismounted, killed their horses to use as cover, and fought until they were overrun. When the 60 survivors were brought to Qizbech, he distributed the unit who surrendered without resistance as slaves, regardless of their rank. He then questioned the other unit on why they fought so fiercely. They stated they were doing their duty and following their commander's orders to kill the horses. Upon learning the commander had been killed, Qizbech praised their admiration and courage, then forgave them and set them free. He ordered that they be given horses from the surrendered unit and escorted back to the Russian outposts.

A separate incident described by Alkhas Misost was about 25 Circassians who captured a small seven-man Cossack outpost. Qizbech summoned both the Circassians and the prisoners and publicly shamed his own warriors. He told his men that for 25 men to capture 7 was not a success but an act of baseness. He stated that they should instead defeat units superior in strength or those equipped with cannons, asserting that the highest victory is to die fighting for honor and freedom. Misost emphasized that Qizbech generally disliked treachery and would defend even a weak enemy.

=== The Sheikh Mansur Movement and Later Conflicts (1787–1792) ===
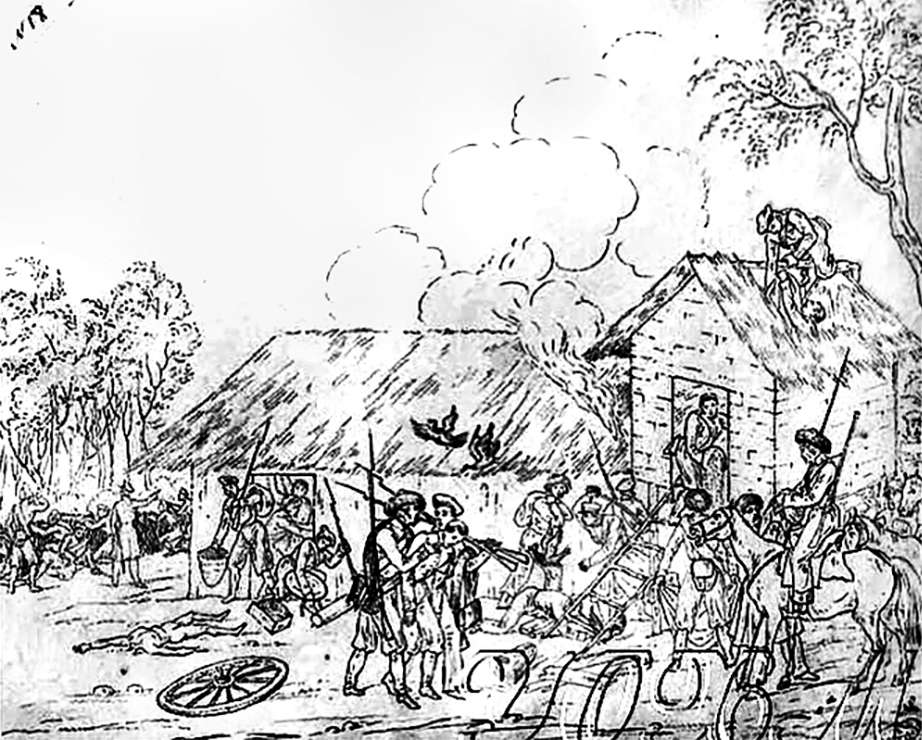
"Taking of an aul" by the Russian forces during the Russo-Circassian War.

In 1787, during the Sheikh Mansur movement, the Besleney leaders joined their forces against the Russians. In September 1787, they fought alongside Sheikh Mansur's ranks in valleys and groves until being dislodged by Russian fire. In October, Besleney villages were destroyed by a Russian offensive under General Tekeli, which led to famine. Despite the Russian efforts and the commitment, the Besleney Principality remained aligned with the Ottoman Empire. During the Russo-Turkish War (1787–92), the Besleney leaders, including Prince Qizbech, swore allegiance and declared their readiness for military cooperation with the Ottomans against Russia.

In mid-1788, Russian forces launched a major offensive against the Besleney, crossing the Kuban River with approximately 15,000 troops. A violent, 40-day war ensued. Besleney leaders initially petitioned the commander at Anapa for cannons and reinforcements, but due to a shortage of supplies, they were unable to provide the requested support. The Besleney elders chose an envoy named "Mir" Mehmed to travel directly to Istanbul to present their situation to the Ottoman authorities. Mir Mehmed was received with significant attention in the capital; he was granted official decrees to be delivered to the Besleney princes and provided with 250 kuruş for his travel expenses.

Upon his return, Mir Mehmed conveyed to the Circassian leaders that Serasker Battal Hüseyin Pasha would come to their aid. Encouraged by this assurance, the Besleney mobilized 15,000 warriors including the other Circassians and engaged the Russian army at a location known as "Uyun". The ensuing eight-hour battle resulted in approximately 3,000 Russian casualties and significant losses among the Circassian forces. Following the battle, the Russian army pivoted toward the Anapa Fortress, with the Circassian units maintaining pressure by tracking and harassing the Russian columns.

In 1789, Qizbech's agent Hajji Ismail submitted an intelligence report to Ottoman authorities alongside the agent of the Chemguy prince Aslanbech. The report detailed Russian military activities and the construction of fortresses in Kabardia, Dagestan, and the Kuban.

In 1790, the Besleney and other regional leaderships including Kabardia, Bzhedug, and Natukhaj mobilized thousands of warriors to join the Ottoman military campaign during the Russo-Turkish War (1787–1792). Within this force, the Besleney contributed 500 cavalrymen. During the march, Serasker Battal Hüseyin Pasha constantly delayed the operation by stopping at different places, ignored the regional leaders, and kept refusing to move into Kabardia. On October 12, instead of attacking, Battal Hüseyin Pasha ordered the Ottoman forces to break up and defected to the Russian side. This left the Circassians and other allied forces in a bad position; instead of a coordinated attack, they had to protect the retreating Ottoman troops as they went back to Anapa. The Pasha’s desertion caused the Ottoman front in the Caucasus to collapse and caused it to being seen as a betrayal.

In 1791, Sultan Selim III issued a decree to build a fortress in Besleney territory, which included a plan to mobilize 300 infantry from Batum and Abkhazia to garrison the site. However, this project failed because the Besleney leaders viewed the Ottoman fortifications as a threat to their independence and blocked their establishment, resulting in no Ottoman fortress being built in the principality. By 1792, diplomatic relations between the Besleney and the Ottoman Empire intensified under the mediation of Koca Yusuf Pasha in Anapa. In August 1792, a prominent Besleney delegation led by Hatughuzhuqo Mirza and his atalyk Islam Bek, accompanied by 25 nobles, arrived in Anapa where they were received with official honors, ceremonial robes, and various gifts.

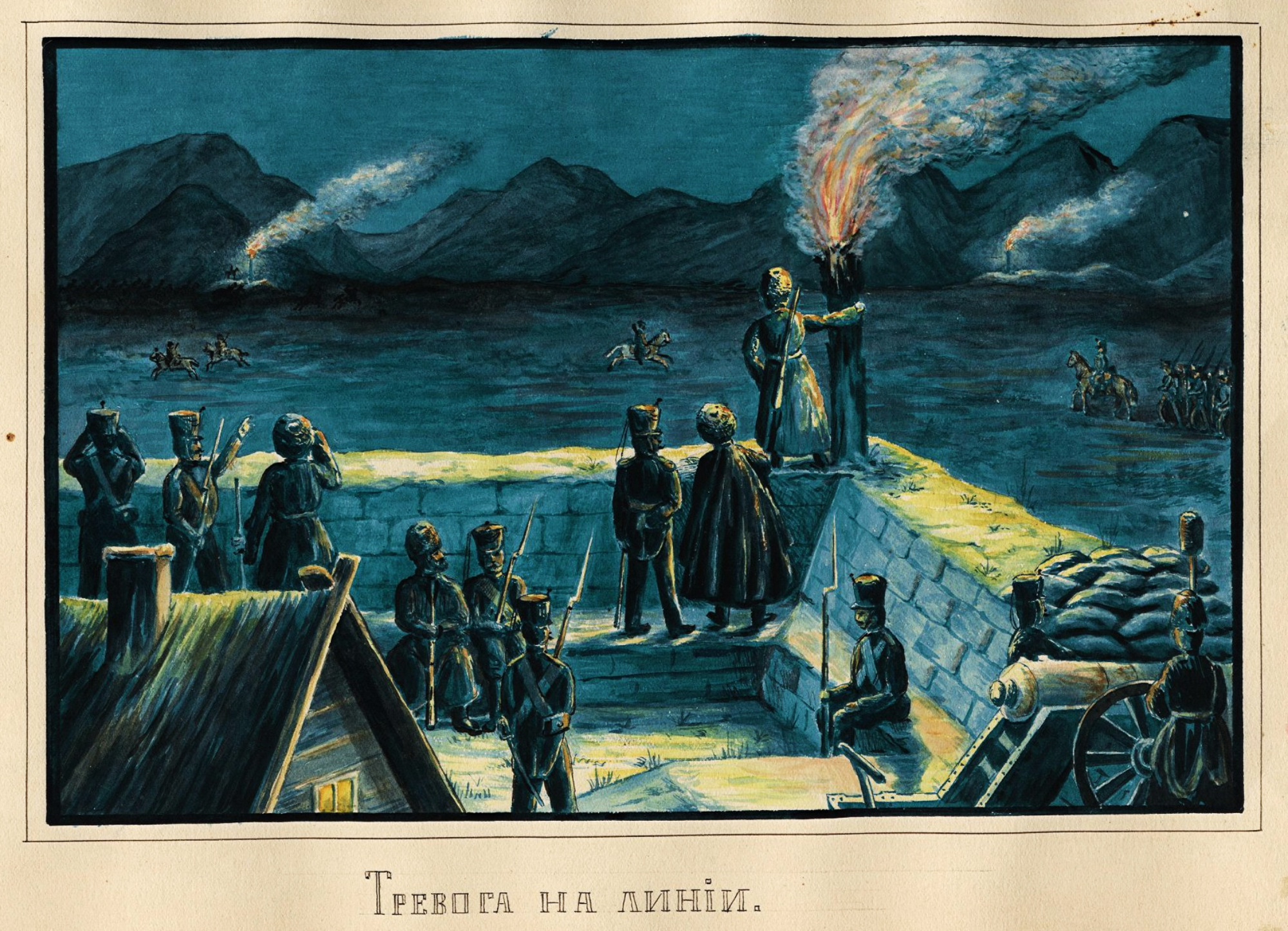
"Alarm on the line"

According to Ottoman records from 1792, Crimean prince Sultan Salih-Giray lived under the protection of Qizbech as a "besleme" (protégé). According to Klaproth, the Besleney leaders frequently collaborated with Kabardians and Nogais to conduct joint raids.

=== Final Years and Succession ===
Qizbech's last known mentions were from Ottoman documents in 1792. Qizbech's death occurred between 1792 and 1807. An Ottoman document from 1800 mentions a salary for his brother, but does not mention Qizbech. By the time Julius Klaproth visited the region in 1807-1808, he recorded that the "powerful prince Kazil Beg Kanoka" was deceased and had been succeeded by his brothers Bekmurza (Bechmirza), Roslanbek (Aslanbech), and Murzabek (Mirzabech).
