= Principality of Besleney =

Principality of Besleney Беслъэней Пщыгъуэ (Kabardian) Бэслъэный Пщыгъо (Adyghe)
- Late 1530s–1860
- The tamga of the Qanoqo princely dynasty which ruled Besleney

- The Principality of Besleney in the first quarter of the 19th century Principality of Besleney Tributary Abazin communities
- Status: Principality
- Common languages: Besleney dialect of Eastern Circassian
- Religion: Circassian paganism & Eastern Orthodoxy (c. 16th century); Sunni Islam (Hanafi) (c. 16th century – 1860)
- Pshi (Prince)
  - Late 1530s: Qanoqo (First)
  - ? – 1860: Adilgeri (Last)
- Governor
  - Early 1850s: Jambot Sholokh
- History
  - Separation from Kabardia: Late 1530s
  - Conversion to Islam; nominal loyalty to Ottoman Caliphate: 16th century
  - Autonomous under the Caucasian Imamate: 1843 – 1844; 1849 – 1857
  - Part of Russian sphere: August 1859
  - Destroyed in the Russo-Circassian War: 1860
Preceded by	Succeeded by
Kabardia	Russian Empire

The Principality of Besleney (Note: Kabardian: Беслъэней Пщыгъуэ; Adyghe: Бэслъэный Пщыгъо; Russian: Бесленеевское княжество; Ottoman Turkish: بسنی بگلیگی) was a historical principality and a region of Circassia. It occupied a strategic position in the upper reaches of the Kuban River and served as a distinct political entity from the late 1530s until the end of the Russo-Circassian War in 1860s. For much of its history, Besleney was an ally of the Crimean Khanate, and the two states had royal marriage ties.

The principality was inhabited by the Besleney Circassians, and was ruled by the Qanoqo (Kanoko) princely dynasty.

== History ==
=== Formation and Early Conflicts ===
Following the death of the Kabardian Grand Prince, Beslan the Fat, a power struggle erupted among the princes for the leadership of Kabardia. (Grand Prince Beslan and Qanoqo's father Beslan were distinct individuals.) The most prominent figure among the rival princes was Talostan Jankhot. Opposing Talostan's policies, Qanoqo sought to lead his subjects away from Kabardia. When the Kabardians attempted to block this migration, Qanoqo allied with Talostan's rival, Idar, who was residing in Western Circassia and trying to gather a coalition to reclaim his inherited lands and end the conflict.

In the Battle of Kyzburun in 1537/1538, Idar's Western Circassian coalition, alongside with Besleneys, defeated the Kabardian army. Thus, Idar has become the Grand Prince of Kabardia. Following the conflict, Qanoqo successfully migrated to the Laba River valley where he established an independent principality with his subjects, according to the ethnographer Shora Nogmov, consisted of 200 families. During this formative period, the Besleney received political support from both the Ottoman Empire and the Crimean Khanate.

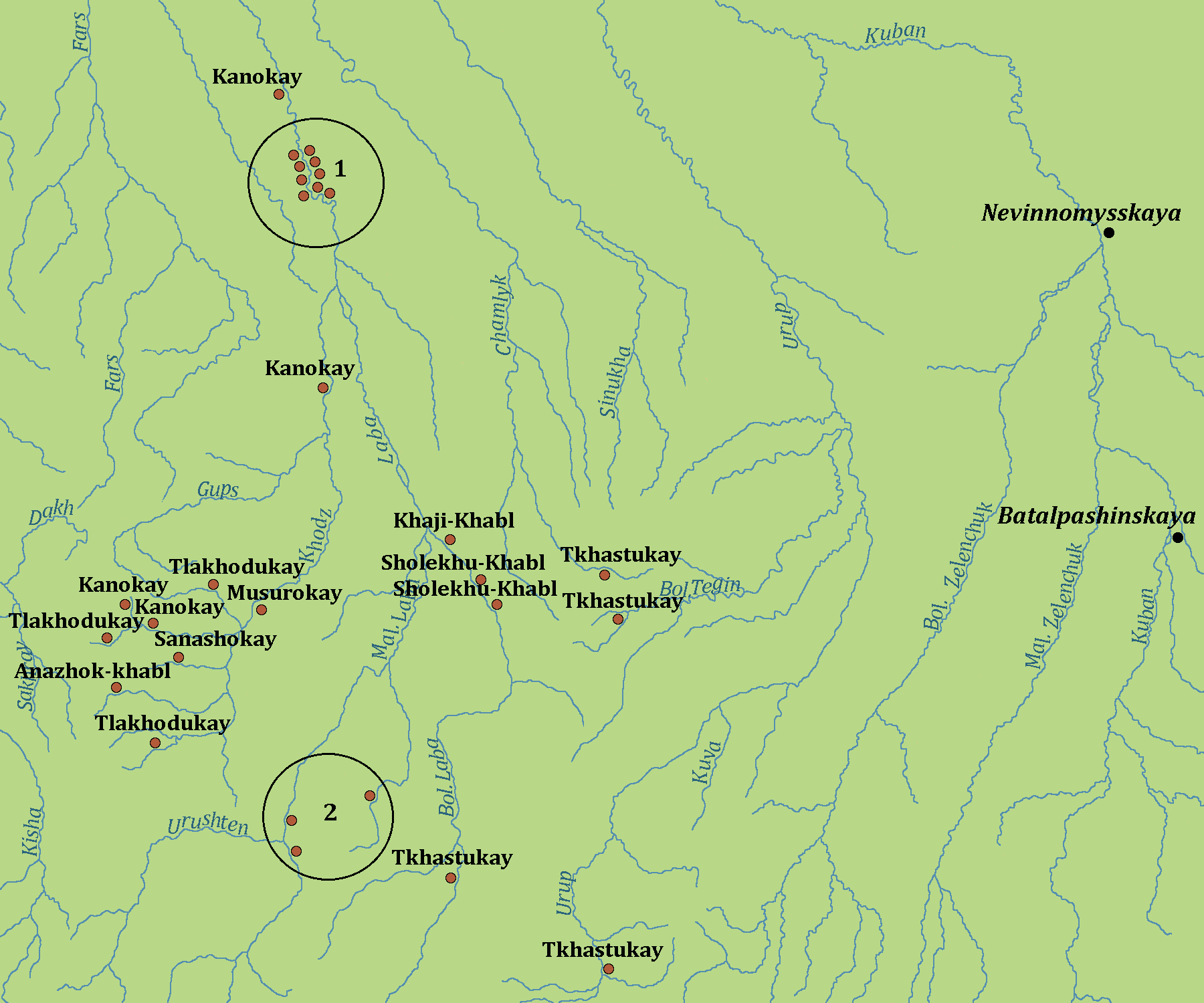
Besleney villages of Circassia around 1830–1850; "1" denotes nine villages destroyed by General Grigory Zass; "2" denotes villages whose names are unknown; The area of village concentration in the upper reaches of the Laba River tributaries is now part of Krasnodar Krai between Adygea to the north and Karachay-Cherkessia to the south

In 1552, during the First Circassian-Kumyk war, Besleneys actively fought alongside the Kabardians and Abazas against the Kumyks and their allies in the Battle of Kishzhibek. Supreme command of the allied Kabardian forces was entrusted to the Besleney Prince Yelzheruqo, son of Qanoqo. As the Avar Utsmi crossed the Terek River, Prince Yelzheruqo and his advance guard met the invading force and attempted negotiations. After negotiations failed, Yelzheruqo withdrew to prepared defensive positions. Two days later, the Utsmi advanced toward the trenches, and Yelzheruqo engaged the enemy. A fierce battle followed, reportedly lasting two days. On the third day, hostilities resumed. During the renewed fighting, the Utsmi was killed, causing confusion among his forces. According to the legend, the Kabardians exploited this disorder, launched a coordinated assault, and drove the opposing army toward the Terek River. It is claimed that only one-third of the invading force managed to escape. In the course of the battle, Prince Koshkao, described as one of the instigators of the campaign, was also killed.

According to the legend recorded by Nogmov, during the wartime, Prince Yelzheruqo once vanished for seven years. It led his people to believe he had been abducted by an evil spirit. Upon his sudden return, he appeared so changed that he was difficult to recognize and seemed to have lost his sanity, with many assuming he had actually been in captivity. He was cured by a man named Tokhshuqo, a Greek by origin who was formerly a priest. In gratitude, the Prince elevated him to the rank of first-degree noble and presented him with many valuable gifts.

=== Relations with Russia and the Crimean Khanate ===
Official diplomatic relations between the Besleney and Russia began under Qanoqo's son Mashuk. In 1552, Prince Mashuk fled the Ottoman court in Istanbul for Moscow, marking the first formal Russo-Circassian contact. Prince Mashuk joined the first Circassian embassy to Moscow to seek protection from Ivan the Terrible against Crimean and Ottoman pressure. Mashuk promised the Tsar the military support of all Circassian princes. There is a view that Mahidevran belonged to the house of Qanoqo.

In 1553, Mashuk strengthened this alliance by participating in Russian military operations in Ukraine. By 1557, he returned to Moscow to swear allegiance to Russia and converted to Orthodoxy, taking the name Ivan. He subsequently facilitated diplomatic missions for his brothers, Kankilish in 1557 and Yelzheruqo in 1559. The delegation that went to Moscow on behalf of Prince Temruqo Idar of Kabardia was headed by Kankilish Qanoqo. During the Livonian War (1558), Prince Mashuk and his Besleney cavalry served in the vanguard of the Russian army, and joined to the capture of approximately 20 fortresses.

Upon returning to Besleney, Mashuk established a pro-Russian faction and allied with Ataman Dmytro Vyshnevetsky. In 1556, their forces captured the fortresses of Temryuk, Taman, and Islam-Kermen. By April 1559, Mashuk led a successful military campaign against the strategic Ottoman stronghold of Azov. Despite these military victories, his conversion to Christianity and Russian alignment alienated his subjects and his local authority weakened. No traditional songs were composed in Mashuk's honor by the people. In 1560, Mashuk was killed by Crimean Tatars in a skirmish near Caffa. After his death, Ivan the Terrible made significant donations to churches in his memory. Mashuk's son Ramadan (Petr), continued his father's service in the Russian court as an Oprichniki. Ramadan's son Vasily also achieved prominence in the Russian administration and died childless in 1652, ending the Mashukov-Cherkassky branch of the House of Qanoqo.

After the death of Mashuk, the principality shifted back towards the pro-Ottoman side. In 1572, the Ottoman commander Özdemiroğlu Osman Pasha was hosted by Besleney princes while passing through their territory.

Two of Crimean Khan Devlet I Giray's four wives were Besleney; one from the noble House of Thazartuqo and the other from the princely House of Qanoqo. The Besleney were known as the primary source for the Crimean Sultans' atalyks (tutors). Under this tradition, a Crimean Sultan raised by a Besleney noble family would often marry into that same family, creating a multi-layered bond with the Besleney. When a Crimean Khan lost his throne or faced Ottoman intervention, he would often seek refuge with his Besleney "foster family". These deep familial ties allowed Besleney nobles and princes to occupy high-ranking positions within the Crimean Khanate. In 1577, the dissatisfied Tatar nobility convened and sent a petition to the Ottoman Sultan. The responsibility for resolving this crisis fell to the newly ascended Khan, Mehmed II Giray. To protect the high status of his Besleney relatives, he executed the leaders of the protesting group in Bakhchisaray.

During the Ottoman-Safavid War (1578–1590), the Besleney participated in campaigns against the Safavids alongside the Ottoman forces and other Circassian principalities. At this time, the Besleney were ruled by a leader named "Zor Bey" in Ottoman documents. According to Circassian oral traditions, the Crimean Khan sought to recruit Circassian forces for the war in 1578. His counselor, Besleney aristocrat Medjadjuqo Tutcheriy, advised him that a voluntary call to arms would be more effective than forced mobilization for Circassians. The Khan followed this advice, and as a result, many Circassians joined the war.

Since the Besleney people had accepted Islam and built family ties with the Crimean royal family, they were given special privileges. They were exempt from the "human tax" and other heavy duties that were normally paid to the Crimean Khanate and the Ottoman Empire.

The Qanoqo dynasty sought out dangerous combat from the age of 15 and considered an honorable death in battle by the age of 25 to be a principle of life. The Qanoqo dynasty faced a major succession crisis in the late 16th century when the lineage was nearly extinct. Seizing this opportunity, the Kabardians offered to send one of their own princes to rule the principality. However, the Besleney managed to maintain their independence after discovering a "hidden" male heir; a young prince born to a Shapsug noblewoman who had been married to the late Qanoqo ruler. This child was brought back to the principality, successfully restoring the dynasty and preventing a Kabardian takeover.

=== 17th–18th century and Regional Alliances ===
The Principality of Besleney originally occupied the foothills between the Belaya, Laba, and Urup rivers. During the formation and expansion of Abzakhs, their territorial pressure forced the Besleney to move eastward, which were causing military clashes between the two groups along the changing borders.

In 1600, during internal conflicta in Kabardia, the faction led by Kazi Pshiapshoqo fled their rivals and took refuge in Besleney Principality for three years.

Durbika, a Besleney princess, first married Nureddin Mubarek Giray, the heir to the Crimean throne. Following his death in 1593, she married Kalga Fetkh Giray, placing the Besleney at the center of Crimean power struggles. She later married to Khan Selâmet I Giray, after Fetkh Giray was executed by Gazi II Giray. Despite this, Durbika's son Canibek Giray ascended to the throne as the Crimean Khan. In 1616, Canibek Giray used the Besleney territory as a strategic base for a military campaign in Kabardia. During this campaign, Besleney prince "Hakecha Bokin" (Hachesh Bakhoqo) fought alongside the Crimean forces. Hakecha's aunt's son was Canibek Giray. Russian intelligence reports from 1616 describe Hakecha as the brother-in-law of the Crimean Khan. Hakecha also joined the Crimean Khan's campaign through the North Caucasus to fight against the Safavid Empire under Abbas the Great.

At the beginning of 1619, Kabardia faced the threat of a second invasion by the Great Nogai Horde. Aledjuqo understood that Kabardia alone could not resist the Nogai Tatars, whose cavalry significantly outnumbered the Kabardian forces. In response, he organized a coalition of North Caucasian groups to oppose the planned invasion. Detachments from Dagestan, Chechnya, and Western Circassia, including forces from Besleney, Chemguy, and Zhaney, gathered in Kabardia under Aledjuqo Shodjenuqo. The formation of this alliance strengthened Kabardia's defensive position. Confronted with the combined forces of several North Caucasian rulers, the Nogais abandoned their invasion plans. In the same year, the Great Nogai Horde, facing additional pressure from Kalmyk movements in the steppe, migrated from the right bank to the left bank of the Volga River. As a result, Nogai raids into Kabardia temporarily ceased.

In 1634, some representatives from the Besleney, along with the Chemguy, Abaza, and Kabardians, arrived in Terek city to swear oath of allegiance to Russia. In 1641, during the internal conflict in Kabardia, leaders of Kazi's Kabardia and the Idarov-Sunchaleyevichs defeated the Moscow-backed coalition at the Battle of Malka on July 12. By December, the victors moved beyond the Kuban River to settle near the Abaza and Besleney territories. This alliance with the Besleney was a strategic move that strengthened their position against their rivals; since they were allowed to access the Besleney military support and benefit from the Qanoqo's strong diplomatic ties with the Crimean Khanate.

In 1660, the Besleney joined other Circassians to support the Crimean army in a military campaign in Ukraine. At the same year, Daichin and other taishas of the Kalmyk Khanate organized a large-scale campaign against the Nogais who were subject to the Crimean Khanate. In November, Kalmyk forces advanced in several columns in different directions. Daichin and Monchak led their main army against the Lesser Nogai Horde, moving toward Temryuk, Azov, the Taman Peninsula, and the Circassian principalies of Chemguy and Besleney, whose rulers had sent forces to assist the Crimean Khan. In December, Monchak's forces defeated the Nogai uluses of Navruz Shidyakov and five other mirzas. Meanwhile, Daichin conducted operations against the Circassian groups of Temryuk, Taman, Chemguy, and Besleney, as well as against several Nogai mirzas, including Urakov, Devey Mirza, Cheban Mirza Ishcherekov, and Navruz Mirza. The uluses of Kantemir Mirza Ablin and Urak Mirza Kaspulatov were also routed. During the campaign, the Kalmyks captured large numbers of prisoners, horses, and livestock from both Nogai and Circassian populations.

Evliya Çelebi visited Besleney in 1666 and noted:

"The bey of Besnibay [sic] resides here. His name is —— and he possesses a total of 5,000 distinguished warriors, both cavalry and infantry, who are an exceptionally strong and brave people. This town is situated within a wide, rocky valley resembling Bakhchisaray... These Besni people settled in this rugged valley as a refuge against the Kalmyks who came from the lands of Moscow and China. Indeed, they are constantly at war with the Kalmyk tribes. They present the [Crimean] Khan with grand gifts, for they are relatives of the Khan through both his wife and his mother."

In 1699, Crimean Tatars conducted a raid into the Circassian region of Besleney. During the raid, at the residence of Prince Temirbolet Qanoqo, the Crimean prince Shahbaz Giray reportedly attempted to seize a girl by force as tribute, in addition to those already selected. According to local accounts, the girl's brothers attacked Shahbaz Giray in response, and he later died of his wounds. It is also believed that the murder was organized by Shahbaz Giray's brothers. According to the folk tale recorded by Shora Nogmov, the one who killed Shahbaz Giray was a Besleney prince named Zaurbek, but according to him, Zaurbek suspected Shahbaz Giray was having an affair with his wife. The killing of a member of the Giray dynasty prompted retaliation from the Crimean Khanate. In 1700 and again in 1701, Crimean forces under the command of Shabaz Giray's brother Kaplan Giray launched major punitive expeditions into Circassian territory, ostensibly for revenge but in reality to plunder, collect tribute and slaves. Facing reprisals and blood vengeance, those held responsible for Shahbaz Giray's death fled from Besleney to Kabardia. Following pressure and retaliatory attacks from the Crimean Khanate, several hundred Besleney families, along with their leaders, sought refuge in Kabardia. They were granted protection by the Kabardian Prince, Qeytuqo Jambulat.

Prince Qeytuqo settled these Besleney refugees on his lands, leading to the establishment of the villages of Mahuqo and Dohchuqo. These settlements later passed to his descendants, including Hamirza Qeytuqo and his brothers. In the late 1740s, Crimean Khan Arslan Giray issued an ultimatum demanding the return of the Besleneys. Despite pressure from Empress Elizaveta Petrovna to comply, Hamirza and his brothers joined their uncle Jembulat in protesting the demand. They argued that the Besleneys had faced repeated atrocities from the Khanate and had only survived through the long-term protection and economic support provided by the Kabardian princes.

In 1739, the forces of Greater Kabardia under Qeytuqo Aslanbech, in alliance with the Kalmyks of Donduk-Ombo, launched a campaign into the Trans-Kuban region. The combined army advanced to the banks of the Laba River and compelled the Besleney and Abaza-Shkharaua to acknowledge Kabardian authority and accept vassal status.

=== Russo-Circassian War ===
In 1764, during the Mozdok crisis, Russian envoy Obreskov strategically labeled the Besleneys alongside the other Western Circassians as Ottoman subjects to justify constructing outposts like Mozdok in Kabardia. By categorizing the Besleney as "foreign" Russia framed these forts as purely defensive measures for self-defence from what it officially recognized as "Ottoman-controlled territory" and effectively turning the Besleney's status into a diplomatic pretext for Russian military expansion into the Kabardian "gray zone". By late 1764, the Kabardian princes were actively inciting Besleneys and Nogais to launch coordinated attacks against Mozdok.

General-Major Medem sent a delegation including Kabardian prince Jankhot Sidokov, Shahbaz Giray, and Russian officer Batyrev to the Besleney and Chemguy principalities to demand their eternal subjecthood, an oath of allegiance, and the provision of noble hostages (amanats). Besleney princes intentionally delayed these negotiations for months by claiming they needed to consult with the Ottoman State and other groups like the Kabardians to avoid a definitive answer. Despite appearing open to peaceful relations, they ultimately issued a firm rejection of the Russian demands and offered only a limited written promise to refrain from attacks. This diplomatic process failed when Batyrev reported that 500 Circassians were already preparing for an assault against Russians.

On August 21, 1771, General Medem and the Kalmyk Khan Ubashi Khan sent an ultimatum to the Besleney, Chemguy, and other principalities demanding their total submission to the Russian Empire under the threat of military invasion. The Besleney princes and their allies rejected this ultimatum by treating the Russian envoys as spies and threatened to kill them if they ever returned with similar demands. Following this rejection, the Circassians declared that they would fight for "their religion and their homeland until the last drop of their blood", leading General Medem to abandon diplomacy and request Kalmyk assistance. However, Ubashi Khan refused to help and left the region, and the Russian forces were forced retreat to Pyatigorsk region to establish a defensive line. The Besleney alongside other Circassians viewed this retreat as a sign of weakness and attacked the Russian line, however the Russian army held the defense.

In October 1777, following the beginning of the construction of Azov-Mozdok line, the Besleney began mobilizing against the increasing Russian presence. General Yakobi received reports that the Besleney and Chemguy forces had gathered near Beshtau. Under the command of Kaziy Giray Sultan, a force of 800 Besleney, Chemguy, and Abaza warriors joined 4,000 Kabardians to launch attacks on Russian positions along the newly established military line. Circassians were also reported to have attacked Cossacks near Madzhar. The Besleneys were allied with the Chemguy Principality in the late 18th century.

On March 29, 1779, Besleney princes, alongside Chemguy princes, participated in the Kabardian National Congress. During this assembly, the Circassian leaders demanded the removal of Russian fortifications along the Azov-Mozdok line. The participants swore an oath to wage war until the Azov-Mozdok line was destroyed and formally severed diplomatic relations with the Russian authorities after their demands were rejected. This was the beginning of the Seven Months' War. Throughout 1779, the Besleney took part in coordinated military actions against Russian positions along their allies; Kabardians, Chemguy and some Nogai societies.

In September 1781, an Ottoman imperial decree was categorizing the Besleney princes and elders alongside the other Circassian groups as subjects of the "Protected Domains" (Ottoman territory). In the same year, during the regional reforms of Ottoman governor Ferah Ali Pasha, the Besleney and Chemguy princes informed Istanbul that they and the Kabardians were ready for a joint war against Russia. They claimed a combined mobilization capacity of 40,000 soldiers if the Ottoman-Russian peace ended.

By 1783, the Russian military had established a permanent battalion at Kapılı and maintained a constant presence at all river crossings, enabling raiding parties of 700 to 800 soldiers to systematically target the Besleney, Chemguy, Bzhedug, and Zhaney principalities. This military pressure compelled the leadership of these principalities to report that without direct Ottoman military intervention, they could no longer sustain their resistance against the encroaching forces.

In October 1783, following the increasing Russian mobilizations in the region, the Besleney leaders joined a major strategic council at the "Entehayır" (possibly the Antkhir River) plain between Zhaney and Hatuqay. Alongside the leaders of the Zhaney, Hatuqay, Chemguy, Bzhedug, and Makhosh principalities, the Besleney swore a formal oath to Ferah Ali Pasha to remain loyal to the Ottoman Sultan. During this assembly, Ferah Ali Pasha prevented Circassians from launching attacks against the "agitator" Shahin Giray, thereby stopping a major regional conflict with Russia. The Circassians requested urgent Ottoman military aid from the Russian border violations and requested official titles to formalize their status as "Ottoman-aligned defenders".

In 1787, during the Sheikh Mansur movement, the Besleney provided reserve forces to support him against the Russians. Besleneys engaged in a forty-day defensive conflict against Russian forces; however, their requests to Anapa for artillery and military reinforcement remained unfulfilled due to the absence of sufficient forces in the region.

In September 1787, they fought alongside Mansur's ranks in valleys and groves until being dislodged by Russian fire. Following General Tekelli's offensive in October 1787, in total of 300 Besleney, Chemguy and Bashilbay settlements destroyed. The destruction of their villages and food supplies forced the Besleney into famine and lead to displacement. Prince Potemkin tasked General Gorich-Bolshoy with persuading the Besleney to swear loyalty to the Russian Empire to stabilize the region. On January 3, 1788, a force of 5,000 Kabardians and 40 princes under Brigadier General Ivan Gorich crossed the Laba River to target the Besleney. Following the devastating offensive by General Tekeli and the subsequent famine, Besleneys were forced to submit a sealed commitment of allegiance to the Russian government. The Kabardian princes acted as guarantors for this submission.

Despite the Russian efforts and the commitment, the Besleney Principality remained aligned with the Ottoman Empire. In the late 18th century, prince Qizbech the Great was the ruler of the Besleney. During the Russo-Turkish War (1787–92), the Besleney leaders, including Prince Qizbech, swore allegiance and declared their readiness for military cooperation with the Ottomans against Russia.

In mid-1788, Russian forces launched a major offensive against the Besleney, crossing the Kuban River with approximately 15,000 troops. A violent, 40-day war ensued. Besleney leaders initially petitioned the commander at Anapa for cannons and reinforcements, but due to a shortage of supplies, they were unable to provide the requested support. The Besleney elders chose an envoy named "Mir" Mehmed to travel directly to Istanbul to present their situation to the Ottoman authorities. Mir Mehmed was received with significant attention in the capital; he was granted official decrees to be delivered to the Besleney princes and provided with 250 kuruş for his travel expenses.

Upon his return, Mir Mehmed conveyed to the Circassian leaders that Serasker Battal Hüseyin Pasha would come to their aid. Encouraged by this assurance, the Besleney mobilized 15,000 warriors and engaged the Russian army at a location known as Uyun. The ensuing eight-hour battle resulted in approximately 3,000 Russian casualties and significant losses among the Circassian forces. Following the battle, the Russian army pivoted toward the Anapa Fortress, with the Circassian units maintaining pressure by tracking and harassing the Russian columns.

On April 6, 1789, Hajji Ismail, an agent of Prince Qizbech, submitted a report to the Ottoman authorities along with the Aslanbech Boletuqo's (Grand Prince of Chemguy) agent Hajji Mehmed. The report detailed Russian military activities and fortresses in Kabardia, Dagestan, and the Kuban. It also advised strengthening ties with the Chechens and recommended removing the "unpopular" and "independently acting" governor of Soğucak, Zanoğlu Mehmed Giray (father of Seferbiy Zaneqo).

In 1790, the Besleney and other regional leaderships including Kabardia, Bzhedug, and Natukhaj mobilized thousands of warriors to join the Ottoman military campaign. Within this force, the Besleney contributed 500 cavalrymen. The low participation in the campaign was due to Serasker Battal Hüseyin Pasha’s mistreatment of the regional principalities, specifically his habit of insulting tribal leaders, withholding promised rewards, and sending false reports to Istanbul claiming they refused to help, which led many groups to limit their support or withdraw entirely. During the march, Serasker Battal Hüseyin Pasha constantly delayed the operation by stopping at different places, ignored the regional leaders, and kept refusing to move into Kabardia. On October 12, instead of attacking, Battal Hüseyin Pasha ordered the Ottoman forces to break up and defected to the Russian side. This left the Circassians and other allied forces in a bad position; instead of a coordinated attack, they had to protect the retreating Ottoman troops as they went back to Anapa. The Pasha’s desertion caused the Ottoman front in the Caucasus to collapse and caused it to being seen as a betrayal.

In 1791, Selim III issued a decree to build a fortress in Besleney territory. The plan included mobilizing 300 infantry from Batum and Abkhazia to garrison the site upon its completion. However the project failed due to Besleney leaders viewing the Ottoman fortifications as a threat to their independence and blocking their establishment. As the result, no Ottoman fortress was ever built on the Besleney principality.

By 1792, diplomatic relations between the Besleney and the Ottoman Empire intensified under the mediation of the Serasker of Anapa, Koca Yusuf Pasha. In August 1792, a prominent Besleney delegation led by Hatughuzhuqo Mirza and his atalyk Islam Bek, accompanied by 25 nobles, arrived in Anapa. They were received with official honors, including the presentation of ceremonial robes (khalat) and various gifts.

The Ottoman government didn't provide the promised military supports to the Besleney and other Circassians, and offered only symbolic gestures instead of practical aid. While officials demanded loyalty through gifts to the nobility, they never delivered the necessary ammunition, artillery, or experienced officers to train the Circassians how to set up and use an artillery battery, or how to fight like a regular army. Without these helps, Ottoman actions stayed on the surface and did not bring any actual results for the Circassian defense.

During his travels in Circassia between 1807 and 1808, Julius von Klaproth noted that the most powerful prince of the Besleney had been Qizbech Qanoqo (Kazil-Beg), who was deceased by that time. He was succeeded by his elder and younger brothers, Bekmurza (Bechmirza), Roslanbek (Aslanbech) and Murzabek (Mirzabech) Qanoqo, who were the first cousins of Hatokhshoqo Hamirza's wife. According to Klaproth, the Besleney leaders frequently collaborated with Kabardians and Nogais to conduct joint raids. The spoils of these campaigns were distributed among the participating groups. While captured Russian adults were sold to Circassians deeper in the mountains, they wouldn't sell the children. Two Makhosh villages, comprising 100 families, migrated to the Besleney Principality and came under their protection.

By 1812, a plague had severely affected certain regions of Circassia. According to Butskovsky, the disease was still ongoing among Besleneys and caused the loss of the "majority of the population".

Between 1818 and 1822, military campaigns and pressure of General Yermolov led 13,000 to 20,000 Kabardians to relocate to the Trans-Kuban region. This movement was a rapid retreat where families abandoned most of their property. These migrants, known as Hajret, primarily settled in the Urup River basin within Besleney territory. They viewed the principality as ancestral land due to the rule of an Inalid dynasty and the Besleneys as a relative. The Hajret maintained high status and actively collaborated with the Besleney to organize military resistance against Russian advances.

Besleneys were part of the alliances that carried out attacks against the Russian lines in the region and posed a significant threat. In 1824, Besleneys started negotiations with Russians, appearing to submit to Russian authority, but used this time to gain opportunity to bring their livestock to the plains and harvest their crops. The Russian administration decided on a "punitive expedition" against the Besleneys.

In August 1824, following the appointment of Seyyid Ahmed Pasha as the Warden of Anapa, Circassians, including the Besleney leaders (among them Aytech Qanoqo), submitted a petition. They stated that a five-year plague epidemic had significantly diminished their population, while Russian forces increased their strength and military actions.

On May 14, during the expedition led by Russian Colonel Katsyrev, Russian forces discovered, burned and destroyed two large Besleney villages near the Tegen River. The Russian detachment captured 250 horses, 350 cattle, and over 1,000 sheep, which were nearly the entire wealth of the principality at the time. They also took the 149 survivors of the villages hostage. To save their remaining crops from destruction, Besleney elders were forced to sue for peace and provide hostages (amanats). Although the nephew of the Pasha of Anapa, Kaznadar-Aga, opposed this by claiming the Besleney were Ottoman subjects, the Russians continued destroying fields until they gave the hostages and secured submission. Besleney leaders who yielded to Russia were subsequently attacked and ruined by the Abzakhs and Shapsugs, who acted under the Pasha's encouragement to punish them for their compliance with the Russian administration.

In April 1825, General Veliaminov launched a campaign against the Hajret Kabardians who had settled in Besleney Principality. The main target was the Karamirzey village of the Hajret Kabardian prince Karamirza Aliy near the Akhmed Mountain. The Russian army destroyed the Karamirzey village in the Karamirzey Massacre. The settlement was razed to the ground and more than 1,000 people were killed including Karamirza Aliy.

On July 24, 1827, prior to the Russo-Turkish War (1828–29), the Besleney leaders submitted a formal deed of allegiance to Hasan Pasha, the Governor of Trebizond and Warden of Anapa, reaffirming their loyalty to the Ottoman caliphate. In May 1828, Russian General Antropov attempted to persuade the Besleney princes to side with Russia. Despite their children being held as hostages (amanats), the Besleney rejected the offer, declaring they would likely fight alongside the Abzakhs. The princes refused to meet the General personally, leading to the failure of the negotiations.

In November 1828, Russian forces under General Emmanuel discovered the village of Hajret Kabardian prince Pshimaf Hatokhshoqo on the Chamlyk River abandoned and subsequently burned it along with neighboring settlements and their grain stores.

On November 18, 1828, the villages of Torkan Thazartuqo, a Besleney nobleman who refused to swear allegiance, were completelty destroyed by Russian troops and Torkan along with several other princes were forced to surrender on November 20. On November 21, General Emmanuel's units moved toward the upper Chamlyk River. Prince Aytech Qanoqo who had 2 villages there (one near Upper Gashkhetuko and the other near Upper Gups), surrendered, visited the Russian camp to swear allegiance and gave his brother as hostage (amanats). Under this agreement, Aytech committed to returning double the value of stolen Russian property and paying triple compensation for any future raids; however, General Emmanuel declined his request to have a Russian official (pristav) stationed in his territory for protection due to security risks.

According to Stahl, during the negotiations with Russia, Besleneys, alongside the Hajret Kabardians and Abazas, notably never mentioned the protection or suzerainty of the Ottoman Sultan, which distinguises their diplomatic stance from most of the other Circassians.

Following the 1829 Treaty of Adrianople, the Besleney were among the twelve confederated provinces that united to maintain independence from Russia. They joined a formal league, swearing an oath to reject any Russian terms of submission without general consensus and appointing Seferbiy Zaneqo as their plenipotentiary representative to seek foreign assistance.

In the 1830s, the Besleney continued to resist the Russian Empire, notably through raids led by Prince Aytech Qanoqo. The Besleney cavalry was considered a strategic necessity in major regional military operations, and historical accounts by Semyon Esadze suggest that almost no significant raid against Russians in the Kuban region occurred without their participation. The Russian frontier suffered considerable damage from these attacks, as the Besleney were regarded as one of the most formidable fighting forces in the Western Caucasus during this period.

In March 1831, Russian troops under General Frolov burned six villages belonging to Hajret Kabardian prince Aslanbek Beslan during a Russian campaign. The Besleney and Hajret Kabardians retreated into the rugged mountains and Abzakhs territories to conduct active defensive operations.

In November 1833, Russian General Grigory Zass crossed the Laba River with 800 infantry and 400 Cossacks to launch a sudden attack on Prince Aytech Qanoqo's village and killed the locals. After the village was destroyed Prince Aytech with a force of 2,000 Besleney, Abzakh, and Hajret Kabardian warriors pursued the retreating Russian detachment to "seek revenge for the village". Besleneys tried to trap the detachment by burning dry grass and reeds, but Zass used grapeshot to break their charge and escaped across the Laba under the cover of night. In 1839, a new village of Aytech was established by survivors of the old village.

In mid-December 1833, Zass attacked two more Besleney villages and reported the attack: "I burned the supplies of hay and millet... thereby depriving them of the possibility to feed and hide their cattle in their strong gorges". This tactic effectively subjected the survivors and civilians to mass starvation during the winter.

In 1834, the Russian military forced the Besleney to relocate to the right bank of the Greater Laba and the Tegen rivers. Throughout 1834 and 1835, Zass conducted campaigns against the Besleney and other Circassians centered on the systematic destruction of villages and resources to eliminate the local means of survival and break the resistance. General Zass forcibly relocated nine Besleney villages to near the Arzhin fortification on the middle Laba between 1835 and 1837. The village of Haji-habl was moved from the Laba River to the Kuban region in 1838 by military order.

According to James Bell, the Circassians that submitted to Russia did so because their location along the Russian border left them exposed. Their plain territories lacked the mountainous terrain necessary to hide from or evade punitive Russian campaigns on their villages. This vulnerability, combined with the continuous delays in promised British helps ultimately forced their surrender. Also, Russian commanders invited 150 leaders of these principalities for a meeting, only to take them hostage for a month until they swore an oath of allegiance.

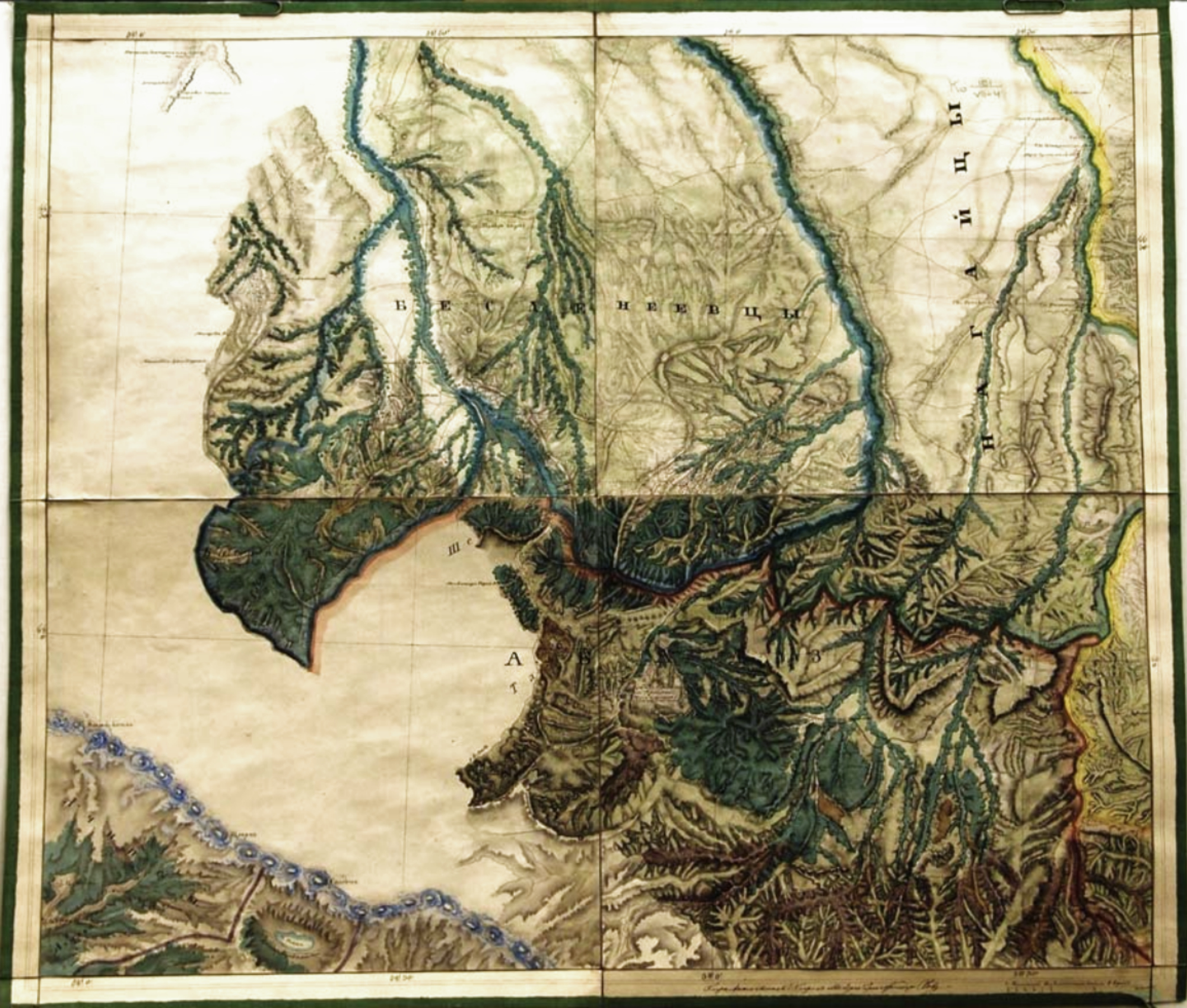
1839 map of the Besleney territory (with borders marked in blue) between the Laba and Urup rivers.

Based on reports from 1839 provided to Russian authorities, by the late 1830s, despite the principality lived in a state of peace with Russia, this was only a temporary peace. The principality remained prepared to "raise the flag of revolt" and join the "common cause" against Russia as soon as they received military support from the British. They believed that Russian control was maintained through the use of force, pressure, and corruption to keep the regional populations divided. Besleneys expressed that despite the increasing difficulties in maintaining communications with foreigners, they intended to challenge Russian authority.

In 1843, under the influence of Imam Shamil's naib, Hajji Muhammad, Besleneys moved beyond the Laba River to the banks of the Khodz River to escape Russian control. After death of the Besleney Grand Prince Aytech Qanoqo in 1844 led the people to return to their original settlements. In 1844, the settlement of Anzaur Thazartuqo was moved from the upper Urup River to its middle reaches. In 1845, Shamil sent his second deputy, Suleyman-Efendi. However he surrender to the Russians in 1846.

In 1846, Muhammad Amin spent two months traveling between Kabardia and Besleney, navigating various Russian military checkpoints along the way. Despite the heavy Russian military presence in Besleney territory causing local unrest, he extended his planned one week visit to a full month due to the significant interest shown by Besleneys. During this time, he integrated into local life by attending weddings, funerals and reading the Quran.

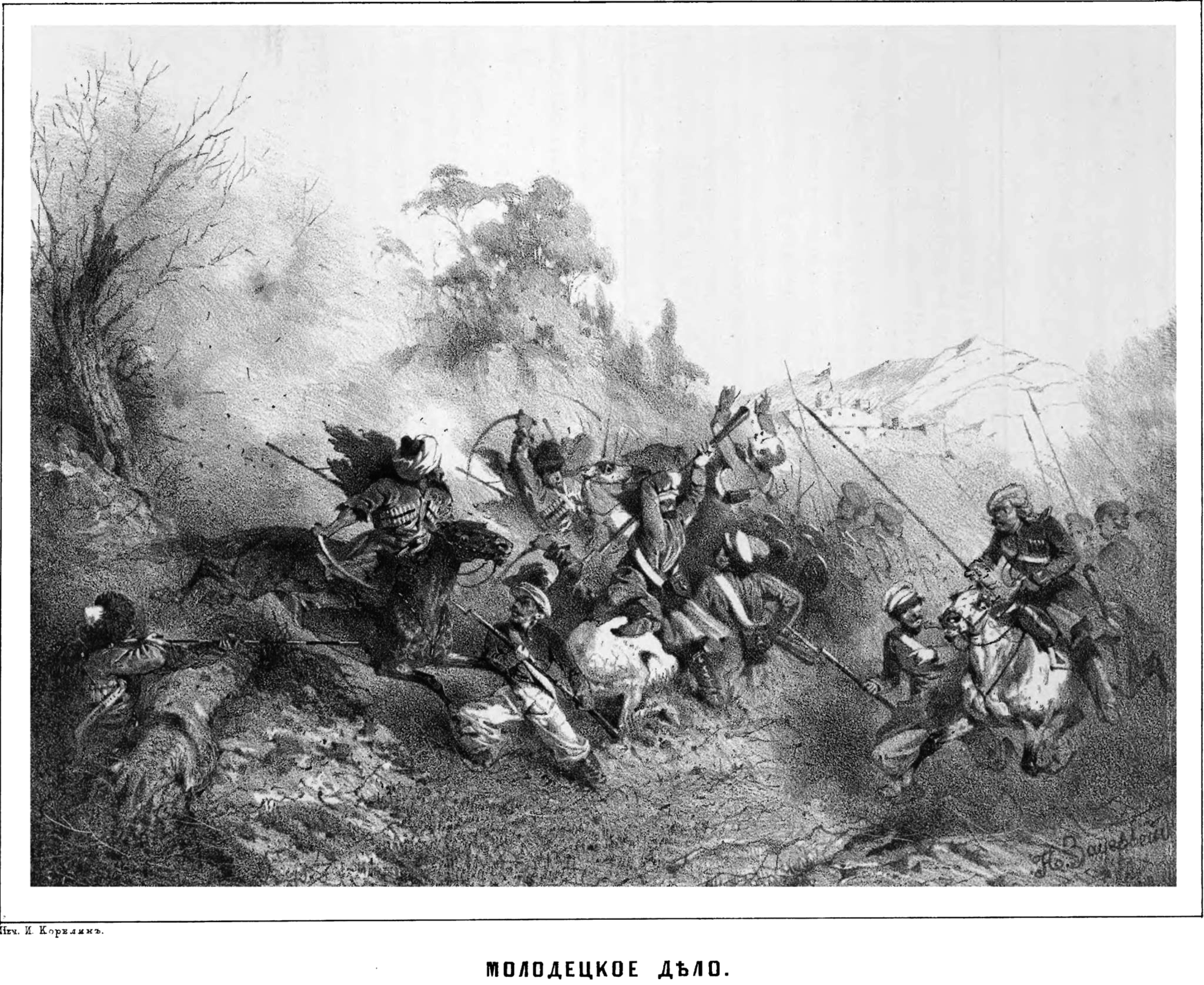
Zakuban Circassians under the leadership of Qanamet Tlakhedughuqo fighting against the Russians near the Akhmet-Gorskoye fortification on the Laba River, 11 May, 1848.

In 1847, the return of the Besleney nobleman Qanamet Tlakhedughuqo from Mecca led to a major uprising against Russia in the region including the Principality of Besleney. Circassians including Besleneys started to attack Russian outposts again. At the same year, following the instigation of Muhammad Amin, Besleneys withdrew beyond the Laba and Belaya rivers to avoid Russian control. In November 1848, a large group of Circassians, including the Besleney, launched an attack on the settlement of Singileyevka. Russian Major General Kovalevsky intercepted the group and defeated them, ending the Circassian attack waves.

In 1849, as Muhammad Amin's influence expanded across the Western Caucasus, a portion of the Besleney (the Bechmirza villages) moved to the left bank of the Laba River. While Russian troops initially blocked others from joining Amin, a Besleney delegation led by grand prince Jambot Qanoqo, alongside noblemen such as Musa Tlakhedughuqo and even the Russian-pensioned Aslanbech Thazartuqo, met Amin at the Urup River on June 13. There, they swore an oath of allegiance, committing to hostility toward Russia and total obedience to his commands in exchange for temporary immunity from his forces. Consequently, the forested areas of the Laba became a strategic sanctuary where the Besleney provided food, shelter, and intelligence to Amin's "Hajret" warriors.

By early 1850, Amin's representative, Sultan Shaham-kikh, demanded total submission to Sharia law. The Besleney formally declared themselves "true Muslims" and accepted the Sharia system, though Prince Adilgeri (Adil-Girey) Qanoqo refused to comply. During this period, the Besleney leadership urged Amin to accelerate his operations before the arrival of the Russian Heir Apparent and the assembly of larger imperial forces.

Under Sultan Shaham-kikh's direction, the Besleney established a centralized administrative and military structure. Prince Jambot Sholokh was selected by the Besleney as "Vali" (Governor) on March 1850, supported by three elders and two qadis. Their administrative council, or Mehkem, was headquartered at the upper reaches of the Greater Tegen River. To maintain order, a 15-man elite guard unit known as murtazik was formed under the command of princes Pshimaf and Kambot Qanoqo. Prince Jambot Qanoqo resisted the Russians' demands to settle his subjects along the Urup River, instead moving them to the Tegen River, which was closer to Amin. On May, the Russian administration detained Jambot Qanoqo's son, Kazbek, and sent him to Temnolesskaya Fortress as a hostage (amanat) to prevent a full defection to Amin's side. In letters to Russian commanders, Jambot requested protection and stated that he "feared attacks from the Abzakhs," but the Russians understood that the real purpose of this request was to open a path for dialogue to rescue his son.

In 1858, General-Lieutenant Filipson ordered the immediate destruction of the villages belonging to the noble Thazartuqo brothers and Prince Sidov, located on the right bank of the Laba River (near present-day Akhmetovskaya): "Immediately assemble a detachment, surround these villages and raze them to the ground; arrest the Tazartukovs and Sidov...". The Thazartuqo brothers, including one named Abaza, were arrested, and their villages were destroyed. The inhabitants were ordered to be resettled among the other Besleneys on the Khodz River and Bashilbays on the Lesser Zelenchuk River.

Following the fall of the Bzhedug Assembly in May 1859, the Besleney and other Circassian communities between the Laba and Belaya rivers began to formally surrender. In the late 1860, General Yevdokimov introduced the plan to resettle the Circassians in the infertile swampy plains or facilitate their exile to the Ottoman Empire. While neighboring communities compiled, the Besleney resisted these orders. In response, Russian troops surrounded them with military operation on June 20, 1861. 600 Besleney families (4,000 people) were then moved under Russian military guard to the Urup River as part of the process of the exile. Following the beginning of the forced displacements of Besleneys, the Russian administration began constructing Cossack settlements on the former Besleney territories. The former Besleney territory was incorporated into the "Upper Laba" (Verkhnelabinskoye) administrative unit (pristavstvo). During this period, the principality's independent status ended, and the lands came under direct Russian military control. The remaining Besleney and Hajret Kabardian groups formed the strongest defense of the Abzakh territories along the upper reaches of the Khodz and Belaya rivers, as recorded in 1860.

In September 1861, the remaining Besleney warriors were positioned alongside Abzakh, Chemguy, and Hajret Kabardian forces in the strategic mountains near the Russian Khamketi fortress to defend the Circassian frontline.

During the Circassian genocide, approximately half of the Besleney population was exiled to the Ottoman Empire.

== Society ==
Besleney settlements primarily stretched along the Khodz, Gubs, Greater and Lesser Laba, and Chamlyk rivers. According to the records of Xaverio Glavani, by the early 18th century, several Abaza communities were vassals of the Besleney Principality. These included the Bashilbay, the Bag, and the Barakay. By the first half of the 19th century, records from Sultan Khan-Giray and other contemporary sources show these same groups, along with the Shakhgirey and Kizilbek, as tax-paying subjects of the Besleney princes. Practically all of the Abaza population in the mountainous zones along the Greater and Lesser Laba, Urup, and their tributaries.

In 1830, Lieutenant Shcherbachev of the General Staff reported that the Besleney, comprising were ruled by the princely house of Kanokov (Qanoqo). Due to the family's growth, the Qanoqo rulers had divided among themselves, with each leader acting independently of one another. At that time, they were settled along the Khodz, Gubs, Greater and Lesser Laba rivers, and the upper reaches of the Chamlyk. Additionally, Shcherbachev noted that five Abaza communities (Barakay, Bag, Kizilbek, Tam, and Bashilbay) were dependent on the Besleney and paid tribute to the Besleney princes.

=== Demography ===
In 1724, Xaverio Glavani noted that the Principality of Besleney consisted of 1,000 households. According to an Ottoman document from 1792, the Besleney had consisted of 25 villages and 3,000 households. In the late 18th century, P.S. Pallas noted that the Besleney were allied with the Principality of Chemguy and could jointly field more than 5,000 warriors. By 1828, Besleney princes representing a total of 630 households entered into a temporary allegiance with the Russian administration. According to Shcherbachev's 1830 report, the population consisted of 700 households with a military strength of 500 warriors. According to a Russian data collected between 1846 and 1852, the population of the principality was 5,115. According to Lieutenant Novitsky's 1830 data which he obtained through personal field observations as a spy, the Besleney population consisted of 3,500 households totaling 70,000 people.

=== Prince families ===
The Besleney princes who claimed descent from Inal were the House of Qanoqo. By the time of Sultan Khan-Giray in the 1830s, the dynasty had branched into two distinct lineages: the Sholokh and the Bechmirza. This genealogical split defined the principality's internal organization, as the territory was divided into two administrative districts named Sholokhiy and Bechmirziy after their respective ruling branches.

=== Noble families ===
According to Adolf Berzhe, the main noble families of the Besleney were; Thazartuqo, Marshoqo, Takhoqo, Tokhushoqo, Aslanoqo, and others. According to Sultan Khan-Giray's record from 1836, the following families were the first-degree nobles of the Principality of Besleney:

Noble Families of Besleney and Their Settlements (c. 1836)
Family Name	Circassian Name	Clan / Branch	Settlement(s)	Location
Anejoqo	Анэжъокъуэ	Tokhushoqo	Anejoqay	–
Bekupseqo (Bogups)	Бэкупсэкъуэ (Богупс)	Tokhushoqo	Bekupsiy (Bogupsiy)	–
Chelmirzeqo	Чэлмырзэкъуэ	Sanashuqo	Chelmirziy	Laba R.
Chileshkh	Чылэшх	Qurghoqo	Chileshkhiy	Fedz R.
Khelzhuqo	Хэлжъыкъуэ	Qurghoqo	Khelzhuqay	Fedz R.
Medjadjeqo	Мэджаджэкъуэ	Qurghoqo	Medjadjequay	Fedz R.
Misostuqo	Мысостыкъуэ	Qurghoqo	Misostiy	Fedz R.
Qurghoqo	Кургъокъуэ	Kurghoqo	Kurghoqay	Fedz R.
Sanashuqo (Shewoneshoqo)	Сэнащэкъу (Шъэуэнэшъэкъуэ)	Sanashuqo	Shanashoqay (Shewoneshoquay)	Laba R.
Takhoqo	Тэхъокъуэ	Sanashuqo	Takhoqay	Shedako R.
Thazartuqo (Thastoqo)	Тхьазэртыкъу (Тхьэстокъуэ)	Tokhushoqo	Thazaretuqay (Thastuqay)	Yetcheptsoqo R.
Tlakhedugh-qo	Лъахъэдыгъу-къо	Sanashuqo	Tlakhodughiy	Laba R.
Tokhushoqo	Тэхъущэкъу	Tokhushoqo	Tokhushoqay	Near Laba R.
Wumafazij	Умэфэзыжъ	Tokhushoqo	Sozeruqay	Okoart R.
Yelbezduqo	Елбэздэкъуэ	Sanashuqo	Yelbezduqay	Laba R.

Second-degree noble families of the Bechmirza princes:

Second-Degree Noble Families of the Bechmirza Branch and Their Settlements (c. 1836)
Family Name	Circassian Name	Settlement(s)	Location
Bizh	Быдж	Bizh-habl	Laba R.
Fesheqo	Фэщэкъуэ	Feshequay	Fedz R.
Ghonch	ГъонкI	Ghonch-habl	Fedz R.
Karaud	Къэрэуд	Karaud-habl	Fedz R.
Qots	Къоц	Qots-habl	Laba R.
Tauj	Таужъ	Tauj-habl	Fedz R.
Tchuqo	Цукъо	Tchuqo-habl	Fedz R.
Yazuq	Езыкъу	Yazuquay	Fedz R.
Yeshimtaz	Ещымтаз	Yeshimtaziy	Fedz R.

== Economy ==
By 1813, the Besleney Principality held the most fertile lands beyond the Kuban and had extensive fields with diverse grain cultivation. Their economy relied on large sheep herds grazed in the high pastures of the Urup, Greater Zelenchuk, and Laba rivers during summer. While their once-renowned horse herds became concentrated among the nobility, Besleneys excelled in beekeeping, producing high-quality honey due to the region's rich flora. The princes and nobles were collecting taxes from the Abazas and their own subjects. The Besleney Principality controlled strategic crossing points along the Kuban River and held the right to collect tolls from those passing through their territory.

== List of Rulers ==
Title	Ruler	Circassian name	Period	Notes
Prince (Пщы)	Beslan, son of Inal	Инал и къуэ Беслъэн		Son of Inal in tradition. There are versions of him being the son of Inal's son Akabgu.
Prince (Пщы)	Qanoqo, son of Beslan	Беслъэн и къуэ Къанокъуэ	c. 1530s	The prince who inherited the Besleney people and became their namesake. The father of Qanoqo.
Prince (Пщы)	Mashuk (Ivan), son of Qanoqo	Къанокъуэ и къуэ Мэхъуэщокъуэ / Мэшыкъуэ (Иуэн)	c. 1552	Son of Qanoqo, the Grand Prince of Besleney who led the first Circassian delegation to Moscow in 1552.
Prince (Пщы)	Zor Bey / Mehmed	Къанокъуэ Заурбий / Мэхьмэд	c. 1583	Mentioned in Ottoman documents from 1583 as the ruler of Besleney. Also known as Mehmed.
Prince (Пщы)	Hachash, son of Bakhuqo	Къанокъуэ Бэхъукъуэ и къуэ ХьэкIэщI	c. 1616	Mentioned in Russian documents as "Hakecha Bokin" from 1616 as the Besleney prince and the cousin of Crimean Khan Canibek Giray; he participated in a major military campaign against Kabardia and the Safavid's alongside the Khan.
Prince (Пщы)	Hasanbiy Qanoqo	Къанокъуэ Хьэсэнбий	c. 1629	Mentioned by Dominican friar Giovanni Luca in 1629 as the prince of Besleney (Bessenada).
Prince (Пщы)	Kantemir Qanoqo	Къанокъуэ Къантемыр	c. 1652	Mentioned in Russian documents from 1652 as a Besleney prince who went to Terek Fortress with the Grand Prince of Kabardia, Aledjuqo Shodjenuqo in 1652. It is unclear whether he was the Grand Prince of the Besleney.
Prince (Пщы)	Unnamed ruler		c. 1666	Mentioned by Evliya Çelebi as the ruler of the Besleney (Besnibay). According to Çelebi, the ruler commanded a formidable force of 5,000 elite cavalry and infantry. His domain was centered in a deep, rocky valley featuring two large settlements of 1,000 dwellings each, which he noted were significant enough to be considered a city.
Prince (Пщы)	Temirbolet Qanoqo	Къанокъуэ Темырболэт	c. 1699	The Besleney ruler whose residence became the site of the 1699 conflict that led to the death of the Crimean prince Shahbaz Giray.
Prince (Пщы)	Talostan Qanoqo	Къанокъуэ Талъостэн	18th c.	Father of Qizbech, Bechmirza, Aslanbech and Mirzabech.
Prince (Пщы)	Qizbech Qanoqo	Къанокъуэ Талъостэн и къуэ Къызбэч	Late 18th c.	Mentioned in Ottoman documents as the ruler of Besleney. His first known mention was in 1781, and then for the last time in 1792. He was most likely to deceased by 1800. By the time Klaproth arrived in Caucasus between 1807 and 1808, he had definitely passed away.
Prince (Пщы)	Bechmirza Qanoqo	Къанокъуэ Талъостэн и къуэ Бэчмырзэ	c. 1807	Brothers of Qizbech Qanoqo. After the death of Qizbech, his brothers became the rulers of the principality. Bechmirza was mentioned in an Ottoman document from 1800 as bey (prince) from the Besleney.
Prince (Пщы)	Aslanbech Qanoqo	Къанокъуэ Талъостэн и къуэ Аслъэнбэч	c. 1807	Brothers of Qizbech Qanoqo. After the death of Qizbech, his brothers became the rulers of the principality. Bechmirza was mentioned in an Ottoman document from 1800 as bey (prince) from the Besleney.
Prince (Пщы)	Mirzabech Qanoqo	Къанокъуэ Талъостэн и къуэ Мырзэбэч	c. 1807	Brothers of Qizbech Qanoqo. After the death of Qizbech, his brothers became the rulers of the principality. Bechmirza was mentioned in an Ottoman document from 1800 as bey (prince) from the Besleney.
Prince (Пщы)	Aytech Qanoqo	Къанокъуэ Айтэч	c. 1820s – 1844	The most influential Besleney ruler during 1830s.
Several princes			c. 1842	From the beginning of the 19th century, the central authority of the principality had gradually weakened. In 1842, the settlements of several Besleney princes were recorded as follows: Prince Sholokh Jembulat (Jembulat Sholokhov) and Prince Sholokh Aslanbech (Arslanbek Sholokhov) were located on the right bank of the Greater Laba River. Prince Sholokh Batirgeri (Batyr-Girey Sholokhov) was settled near the upper Chamlyk River on the left bank of the Okar stream, while Prince Qanoqo Batirgeri (Batyr-Girey Kanokov) was also recorded in the same area along the Okar.
Prince (Пщы)	Jambot Qanoqo	Къанокъуэ Жамбот	c. 1849	Mentiones as the "grand prince" (старший князь), of the Besleney. In 1849, he swore an oath of allegiance to Muhammad Amin. He wrote letters of allegiance to the Russian authorities while secretly negotiating with Muhammad Amin and planning to evacuate his people to areas under Amin's control. To prevent his full defection, the Russian military took his son, Kazbek Kanokov, as a hostage (amanat) in 1850. Jambot is documented in 1858 who governed an aul near the Gizinchshe River. In 1860, Jambot declared their intention to stay in the Caucasus.
Governor (Уэлий)	Jambot Sholokh	Къанокъуэ Жамбот Щолэхъу	Early 1850s	In 1842, his settlement was located on the right bank of the Greater Laba River. On March 1850, Prince Jambot Sholokh was officially elected by the Besleney people as their Vali (Governor). This appointment established him as the central administrative leader of the Besleney under the system introduced by Muhammad Amin. Also known as Jembulat.
Prince (Пщы)	Adilgeri (Adil-Girey) Qanoqo	Къанокъуэ Aдилгьэрый	? – 1860	In August 1859, Adilgeri, along with other Besleney elders living on the Khodz river, met with Russian authorities at the Psebai fortification to formally announce their submission to the Russian government. In 1860, Prince Adilgeri Qanoqo, who was located near the Gizinshsha River, led his subjects in their migration to the Ottoman Empire.

== Settlements ==
Aristocratic Besleney Settlements (1842)
Owner	Status	Location	Population (M/F)	Total
Arslanuqo Yazuq	Second-Degree Noble	Right bank of Laba	115 / 93	208
Muhammad Yeldar	Noble	Right bank of Greater Laba	39 / 63	102
Muhammad Yelbezduqo	First-Degree Noble	Right bank of Greater Laba	140 / 122	262
Jembulat (Jambot) Sholokh	Prince	Right bank of Greater Laba	48 / 39	87
Arslanbek Sholokh	Prince	Right bank of Greater Laba	124 / 118	242
Haji Muhammad Bizh	Second-Degree Noble	Right bank of Greater Laba	107 / 103	210
Musa Tlakhedughuqo	First-Degree Noble	Left bank of Greater Laba	88 / 88	176
Batcheri Sholokh	Prince	Left bank of Okar, upper Chamlyk	118 / 106	224
Pshimaf Tarmav	Noble	Right bank of Greater Laba	59 / 52	111
Sawsaruqo Marshan	Noble	Lesser Tegen	102 / 93	195
Ensign Krimdjeriy Tokhushoqo	First-Degree Noble	Lesser Tegen	219 / 213	432
Doletuqo Baguzh	Noble	Shanushkuako (8 versts from Urup)	99 / 82	181
Muhammad Tokhushoqo	First-Degree Noble	Shanushkuako (near Lesser Tegen)	76 / 64	140
Pshimaf Hatokhshoqo	Kabardian Prince	Shanushkuako	78 / 69	147
Ademiy Thazartuqo	First-Degree Noble	Psazhiyako (8 versts from Urup)	138 / 133	271
Arslanbek Thazartuqo	First-Degree Noble	Urup	123 / 118	241
Ismail Tokhushoqo	First-Degree Noble	Greater Tegen	135 / 131	266
Narchuk Haji	Noble	Fars	63 / 57	120
Ensign Mamyk Shugur	Noble	Left bank of Kuban	33 / 31	64

In January 1834, a small 16-household village of Kazi-Giray was recorded on the left bank of the Laba River. At least two Sholokh prince-villages were recorded on the Laba River in late 1841. In early 1843, a village of Doletuqo Pshiqanoqo was recorded on the right bank of the Laba River. In 1858, a settlement of Shanashoqay was recorded on the Gurmay River. In 1858, a 22-household village of first-degree noble Abat Thazartuqo was recorded on the Urup River, above the Urup gorge, consisting of Hajret Kabardians. In 1858, a settlement of Tlichesh Anejeqo was recorded on the Gurmay River. In 1860, village of Prince Adilgeri Qanoqo was recorded on the Gizinshcha River, a left tributary of the Khodz. In 1860, a village of nobleman Hadji Misiriqo was recorded on either the Khodz or Belaya rivers. On 1860, a village of first-degree noble Jiraslan Musa Tlakhedughuqo was recorded approximately on the Gizinshcha and Gurmay rivers.
