= Anapa campaign (1788) =

Russian military failed attack to capture fortress of Anapa

- Part of Sheikh Mansur Movement and Russo-Turkish War (1787–1792)
Date	11 August – 14 October 1788
Location	Anapa, North Caucasus
Result	North Caucasian–Ottoman victory

Belligerents
Sheikh Mansur Movement; Ottoman Empire	Russian Empire

Commanders and leaders
Sheikh Mansur; Hussein Pasha	(Russian Empire) Peter Tekeli (Russian Empire) Johann von Fersen (Russian Empire) General Talyzin (Russian Empire) Lieutenant Mansurov

Strength
At Ubin: 10,500; At Anapa: 22,000	~17,000; ~33 cannons

The Anapa campaign in 1788 was a military expedition launched by the Russians to capture the fortress of Anapa. The expedition ended in failure for the Russian army.

== Campaign ==
On April 22, 1788, the Russian prince Grigory Potemkin ordered the general Peter Tekeli to march against the Ottoman fortress of Anapa and capture it; however, the strong floods of mountain rivers in 1788 did not allow the campaign to begin. Only in 11 August did General Tekelli begin marching; he was accompanied by General Talyzin. On September 11, the Russians crossed the Kuban river. The Russians successfully overcame enemy attacks and crossed the Ubin river on September 25.

Tekelli divided the troops into two forces under General Ratiev and Colonel Hermann. A third force under Lieutenant Mansurov was the first to move to the upper river to meet the Turks. Mansurov's detachment suddenly came across the Turkish camp led by Mustafa Pasha. The Caucasian-Ottoman forces consisted of 2,500 Turks and 8,000 Caucasians. Mansurov's detachment did not even have time to regroup for battle when they were surrounded by the enemy. Having formed a square, Mansurov fought off attacks for five hours until reinforcements arrived and forced the Ottomans to retreat.

On October 13, 1788, the Russians arrived at Anapa fortress, preparing the fortress for defense. On October 14, Colonel Hermann, with one dragoon brigade and the Volga Cossack regiment, made a reconnaissance of the fort. The Ottomans attacked with heavy fire from the fort. When all the fortress guns fired a volley at once, the head of the Turkish garrison, Hussein Batal Pasha, appeared at the main front.

When the Caucasians, who were hiding in the forests around the fortress, saw Batal Pasha in the front, they suddenly marched with 11 guns against the Russians and, under the cover of their fire, launched a fierce attack which forced the Russians to retreat. At the same time, Janissaries came out of the fortress gates and rushed towards the Russian.

The Russians were in a critical situation. Colonel Hermann was rescued by reinforcements who arrived in time, which gave him time to retreat. However, the reinforcements were in a dangerous situation as well. The garrison launched a sudden sortie against the Russians, but they were saved by the Dragoon Brigade, which successfully pushed back the Ottomans and Caucasians who came to rescue them. Soon after this battle, Tekelli realized that attacking the fortress would cost him the lives of his soldiers and would be difficult to hold.

== Aftermath ==
Catherine and Prince Potemkin were dissatisfied with the actions of Tekelli, accusing him of lacking energy and determination. Tekelli was removed from his post as commander but continued to serve in the Caucasus.

The Sultan dispatched firmans to the Caucasians with a call to expel the Russians from the Caucasus. Imam Mansur launched his religious sermons among the Caucasians. They favorably listened to the speeches of the imam instead of the Turks, whom they considered no less threatening to their independence as the Russians.

== See also ==
- Siege of Anapa (1788) – failed Russian siege of Anapa during the campaign
- Anapa campaign (1787) – first Russian campaign against Anapa
- Anapa campaign (1790) – third Russian campaign against Anapa

== Bibliography ==
- Мусаев, Алаудин (2007). Шейх Мансур [Sheikh Mansur] (in Russian). pp. 71–72.
- Kadir I. Natho, Circassian History.(2009)
