= Bechmirza Jambot =

- Bechmirza the Bear

Prince of Bechmirzey
- Reign: fl. 1670s–1693
- Predecessor: Office established
- Successor: Tatarkhan the Golden
- Born: 17th century Kabardia
- Died: 1693; Kabardia
- Burial: Chegem
- Issue: Sons: Tatarkhan; Yelmirza; Batoqo; Doletceriy/Alexander; Sholokh; Qeysin
Names
- Bechmirza, son of Jambot
- Kabardian: Жамбот и къуэ Бэчмырзэ
- House: Inalid dynasty; House of Jambot; House of Bechmirza (founder)
- Father: Jambot Qaziy

Bechmirza Jambot (Kabardian: Жамбот Бэчмырзэ) Also known as Bechmirza the Bear (Kabardian: Бэчмырзэ Мыщэ) was a Kabardian prince and one of the leading figures of the Qeytuqo–Bechmirza princely rivalry in the late 17th century. The son of Jambot Qaziy, he disputed his brother Qeytuqo Jambot over their inherited possessions and subsequently sought military support from the Crimean Khanate. He spent several years in Crimea before returning to Kabardia, where he established the Bechmirzey appanage. Bechmirza was the father of several prominent Kabardian princes, including Tatarkhan, Qeysin, and Batoqo.

== Biography ==
Bechmirza was the son of Jambot Qaziy. Kabardian historian Shora Nogmov wrote the following about him:

"Prince Bekmurza of Greater Kabarda began a dispute with his brother Kaituko (Qeytuqo) over their inherited possessions. With the breach of the vow of brotherly love and friendship, disrespect for their elder brother and disdain for his authority, bequeathed by their fathers, arose between them. On the other hand, the self-interested bifako-orki, i.e., 'educators and guardians,' sought to intensify their enmity, persuading them: '...and I will strike a blow, are you poorer than he?' Thus, without thinking of the common good and forgetting the past years, they renewed their disputes everywhere and thereby voluntarily brought disaster upon themselves and their people and fell under the yoke of foreigners..."

Seeking to defeat Qeytuqo, Bechmirza traveled to Crimea to request military support from the Crimean Khan. The presence of the Crimean Khan's forces in Kabardia was associated with the collection of tribute in people and livestock, as well as killings and devastation.

Bechmirza subsequently participated in a battle alongside the Crimean army. Documentary evidence of his involvement is found in a report submitted to the Ambassadorial Prikaz by Prince Kasbulat Musalovich Cherkassky in 1674. In it, he reported:

"...he, Musost-murza, with his children and nephews, the Zhanbulatov children (Qeytuqos), with Bek-murza and their children, killed the Kabardian Adil-Girey-murza because he, Adil-Girey, and Dengizbey-murzas with their brothers and children and nephews became you, the great sovereign, in eternal servitude and did not join the Crimean Khan. And, having killed him, Adil-Girey, he, Musost-murza, with his children and nephews, went to Crimea with all his possessions and took my, your slave's, possession with him against his will (by force)."

Kasbulat the Brave, with the help of Kalmyk forces and his own retainers, prevented Misost from reaching Crimea and restored him to his former position, taking his son Hatokhshoqo as a hostage. Misost pledged allegiance to Russia, but according to Russian sources, he "did not sacrifice his nephews, Bek-Murza, and the Zhanbulatov brothers (Qeytuqo family), children on the Kuran," realizing that "Bek-Murza would not abandon the Crimean Khan."

Thus, Bechmirza appears to have left for Crimea sometime between the late 1660s and early 1670s.

Nogmov further wrote:

"Kurgoko left two sons: Mugamet (Bemat) and Tsha; seniority passed to Bekmurza and Kaituko. However, disagreements over the right to rule between them did not cease, and the people, in order to avoid further bloodshed, divided the inheritance left by their father (the lands from Chegem to Urukh to the Terek) into two equal parts. The princes allocated them several of their holdings and also added the estate of the Shogenokovs, and from that time on they began to rule separately, each his own share. Bekmurza, hating Kaituko without any reason, a few years later went to the Crimean Khan with the intention of requesting an army to subdue Kaitukin, supposedly in revenge for the insult."

This account corresponds with the documentary evidence. Nogmov also stated that Bechmirza spent three years in Crimea and that the Khan promised to support him with an army. However, Qeytuqo died, leaving three sons: Aslanbech, Qanamat, and Jambolet. Bechmirza subsequently returned to Kabardia, where he "held power for some time" before eventually dying and leaving six sons.

Following the division of hereditary landholdings, the Bechmirza and Qeytuqo families established their own fiefdoms, which became known as Bechmirzey and Qeytuqey, respectively.

The lands allocated to Bechmirza Jambot were located on the left bank of the Cherek and Chegem rivers and remained under his family's control until 1765. They included the territory of present-day Chegem, where the tombs of the Bechmirza family are located. The burial site of Bechmirza and his son Yelmirza was later visited by the Russian academician Johann Anton Güldenstädt, who wrote in his travelogue:

"...near its bank (Chegem) is the grave of Prince Bekmurza, son of Zhambot, who fell ... in battle with the Crimean Tatars, and nearby is the grave of his son Elmurza, who died four years ago as a general in Kizlyar, and his other descendants. A stone mausoleum has been built over their graves."

Bechmirza's eldest sons, Tatarkhan, Qeysin, and Batoqo, were also buried there.

Bechmirza's court, or principal estate, was located in the center of his fiefdom on the left bank of the Chegem. The court of his son Batoqo was located in the Kyzburun tract, on the right bank of the Baksan.

V. N. Sokurov dates Bechmirza's death to 1693, agreeing with Nogmov that he died in battle against the Crimeans.

== Legacy ==
Bechmirza was known among the people by the nickname "The Bear" (Мыщэ), reportedly because of his harsh treatment of his entourage and subjects. His son Tatarkhan later became known as "The Golden" and, in contrast to his father, was regarded as an exceptionally kind, polite, and eloquent person. This contrast gave rise to the proverb "The bear gave birth to gold" (Kabardian: Мыщэ лъхуэри дыщэ къилъхуащ).

== Sources ==
- Kardanov, Ch. E. (2016). Князья Кабарды [Princes of Kabarda] (in Russian). Nalchik: Izdatel'stvo M. i V. Kotlyarovykh. ISBN 978-5-93680-971-2.
