= Crimean–Circassian wars =

List of wars between Crimera and Circassian tribes

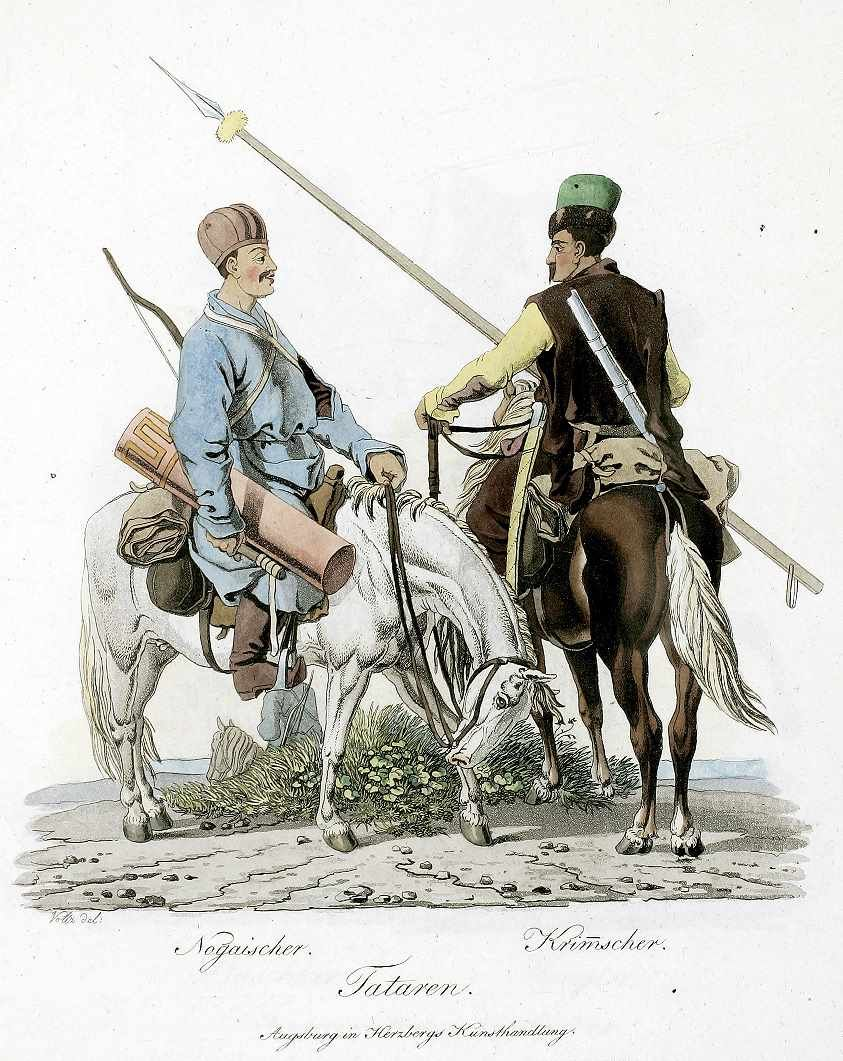
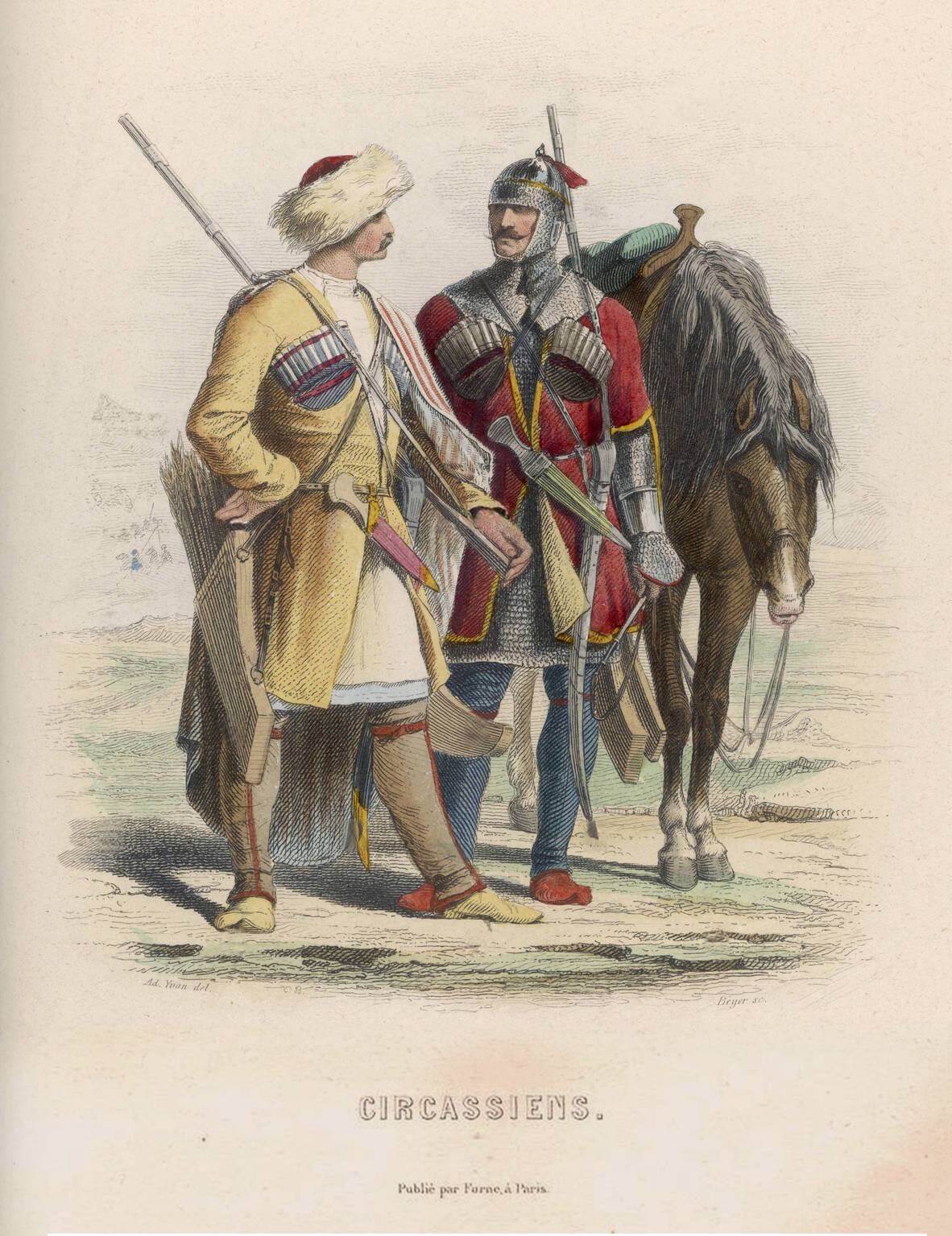
- Nogai and Crimean Tatar horsemen (left) and two Circassians (right)
Date	1479-1774
Location	Caucasus and Crimea
Result	Circassian victory: Circassia remains independent; Devastation of Tatar and Circassian lands; Eventual annexation of both by Russia

Belligerents
(Crimean Khanate) Crimean Khanate; Supported by: Ottoman Empire; Nogai Horde; Shamkhalate of Tarki; Astrakhan Khanate; Pro-Crimean Circassians (Note: Some Circassian principalities occasionally sided with or became vassals of the Crimean Khanate for political reasons (for example: dynastic marriages). At other times, during internal conflicts among the Circassians, factions allied with the Khanate would turn to them for support.); Kalmyk Khanate (1734)	Circassia: States and Tribes: Shapsug; Natukhaj; Kabardia; Zichia; Bzhedug; Hatuqay; Makhosh; Besleney; Chemguy; Zhaney; Supported by: Tsardom of Russia; Terek Cossacks; Zaporozhian Cossacks; Greben Cossacks; Dadianis; Kalmyk Khanate

Commanders and leaders
See list: (Crimean Khanate) Meñli I Giray (Crimean Khanate) Mehmed I Giray † (Crimean Khanate) Ğazı I Giray (Crimean Khanate) Saadet I Girai (Crimean Khanate) İslâm I Giray (Crimean Khanate) Sahib I Giray X (Crimean Khanate) Devlet I Giray (Crimean Khanate) Saadet II Giray (Crimean Khanate) İslâm II Giray (Crimean Khanate) Fetih I Giray (Crimean Khanate) Ğazı II Giray (Crimean Khanate) Mehmed III Giray (Crimean Khanate) Canibek Giray (Crimean Khanate) İnayet Giray (Crimean Khanate) Bahadır I Giray (Crimean Khanate) İslâm III Giray (Crimean Khanate) Selim I Giray (Crimean Khanate) Murad Giray (Crimean Khanate) Devlet II Giray (POW) (Crimean Khanate) Qaplan I Giray (WIA) (Crimean Khanate) Devlet III Giray (Crimean Khanate) Saadet IV Giray (Crimean Khanate) Meñli II Giray (Crimean Khanate) Fetih II Giray (Crimean Khanate) Selâmet II Giray (Crimean Khanate) Selim II Giray (Crimean Khanate) Halim Giray (Crimean Khanate) Qırım Giray (Crimean Khanate) Selim III Giray (Crimean Khanate) Maqsud Giray (Crimean Khanate) Devlet IV Giray (Crimean Khanate) Adil Giray (Crimean Khanate) Alp Giray (Crimean Khanate) Mubarak Giray (Crimean Khanate) Yaman Giray (Crimean Khanate) Shahbaz Giray † (Crimean Khanate) Nurreddin Giray (Crimean Khanate) Bakhti Giray † (Crimean Khanate) Murad Giray † (Crimean Khanate) Ghazi Giray (Crimean Khanate) Kazy Giray † (Crimean Khanate) Shirin Beg † (Crimean Khanate) Mansur Beg † (Crimean Khanate) Yurulshi Beg † (Crimean Khanate) Jarik Beg † (Crimean Khanate) Shahin Giray (Crimean Khanate) Meñli II Giray (Crimean Khanate) Yaman Giray (Crimean Khanate) Musa Lulu (Crimean Khanate) Navruz Lulu (Crimean Khanate) Bagadyr Giray (Crimean Khanate) Sahib Giray (POW) (Crimean Khanate) Hajji Ali Agha (Crimean Khanate) Safi Giray (Crimean Khanate) Salikh Giray (Crimean Khanate) Bakhadyr Giray †	See list: (Circassia) Tabuldu (Circassia) Inarmas (Circassia) Beslan (Circassia) Idar (Circassia) Qeytuqo I (Circassia) Temruqo (DOW) (Circassia) Qambolet (Circassia) Qeytuqo II (Circassia) Sholokh (Circassia) Qudenet (Circassia) Alejuqo (Circassia) Hatokhshoqo (Circassia) Kurghoqo (Circassia) Hatokhshoqo (Circassia) Tatarkhan (Circassia) Aslanbech (Circassia) Batoqo (Circassia) Bemat (Circassia) Qasey (Circassia) Jankhot (Circassia) Antanuq (POW) (Circassia) Qansavuq (surrendered) (Circassia) Tkhemuj Janqot (Circassia) Andemirqan (Circassia) Peterzeqo (Circassia) Buzhaduk (Circassia) Aledjuq (Circassia) Bulatdjery (POW) (Circassia) Mamstruk (POW) (Circassia) Jabagh (Circassia) Nemere Shubs (Circassia) Talostan (Circassia) Kasbulat (Circassia) Temirbolet Qanoqo (Circassia) Mutsal

The Crimean–Circassian wars were a series of intermittent conflicts between the Crimean Khanate and various Circassian tribes from the late 15th century to the 18th century. These wars were primarily driven by slave raids, territorial disputes, and political alliances. The Crimean Tatars frequently launched raids into Circassian lands, capturing thousands of slaves and exerting influence over the North Caucasus. These conflicts contributed to the long-term instability and demographic changes in the region.

== List of Crimean raids ==
=== 16th century ===
Year	Description
1539, 1545, 1546, 1547	Devastating campaigns of the Crimean Khan Sahib Giray against the Circassians that lasted until 1551, his assassination.
1551	The Crimean Khan Sahib Giray launched a new campaign, this time against the Hatuqay tribe, however he eventually retreated from the Circassian lands with no success.
1553	A large Crimean-Tatar horde led by Khan Devlet Giray (1551–1577) invaded Kabardian lands, causing massive destruction. However, the Crimeans failed to consolidate their position in Kabarda, as the Kabardians expelled them.
1554	Devlet Giray led another campaign against Kabarda. "That summer, he marched against his enemy, the Circassians of the Five Mountains, with his army." The Crimean Tatars returned "with great spoils".
1555	The Crimean horde "with all its forces" attacked the land of the "Circassians of the Five Mountains." In repelling the enemy, the Kabardians, fighting alongside Russian warriors for the first time, managed to inflict heavy losses on Khan Devlet Giray, forcing him to retreat.
1556	The Crimean Khan Devlet Giray, leading a Tatar horde, advanced on Kabarda. The Kabardians, forewarned, met the enemy at their borders. Khan Devlet Giray was forced to retreat.
1567	Crimean princes Mehmed Giray, Adil Giray, and Alp Giray (sons of Khan Devlet Giray) arrived in Kabarda "with a large army." "They waged war across the entire Circassian land, burning it, capturing wives and children, and driving away livestock and sheep." They took more than 20,000 captives. According to other sources, "the princes did not conquer the Circassians," meaning the Crimeans were expelled.
1569	A campaign by a 130,000-strong Turkish-Crimean army under the command of the Kaffa Pasha Kasim-bey and Khan Devlet Giray against Astrakhan. The enemy was completely defeated by Russian forces near Astrakhan. During the retreat along the "Kabardian road," the Kabardians crushed the remnants of the Turkish-Crimean army.
1570	A Crimean army under the command of Khan Devlet Giray's son Adil Giray invaded Adygea and Kabarda. The Kabardian prince Temruqo arrived with his retinue to aid the western Circassians. The Crimean Tatars ravaged and captured many Circassians (among the captives were two sons of Kabarda's senior prince Temruqo—Mamstruk and Bulgayruk). Temruqo Idar himself was severely wounded in battle. Despite this, the Circassians drove out the Crimean forces.
1578	The Crimean prince Adil Giray "with a large force" was returning from Dagestan through Kabarda. In battle, Kabardian princes and Russian detachments led by voivode L. Z. Novosiltsev defeated the enemy.
1583	A significant Turkish-Tatar army led by Osman Pasha entered Kabarda. In battles near the Sunzha River crossing (Lesser Kabarda) and the Beshtau region (Greater Kabarda), the Kabardians and Terek Cossacks inflicted heavy losses on the enemy.
1593	A campaign by the Crimean army under Prince Mubarak Giray against the Terki Fortress. Battles occurred near the Terek outpost and in Kabarda. The Crimeans were forced to retreat, burning and destroying everything in their path. However, Mubarak Giray failed to achieve his objective, being repelled by the Terek Cossacks and Kabardians.

=== 17th century ===
Year	Description
1606	A large Crimean horde attacked Circassia and Kabarda. Fierce battles occurred, resulting in significant destruction and the capture of livestock (amounting to tens of thousands). Many prisoners were taken.
1607–1608	Crimean Tatars reappeared in Kabarda, remaining for several months. They collected heavy tribute, accompanied by the devastation of Kabardian settlements.
1614	Crimean prince Yaman-Girey ravaged seven villages in Temirgoy. A Russian source states: "The Crimean tsar Yaman-Girey-sultan came with his warriors against the Kumirga Circassians, attacked 7 auls, and destroyed those auls by cunning."
1616	A 12,000-strong Crimean army led by Khan Canibek Giray invaded Kabarda. The campaign brought destruction, ruined crops, and caused many deaths. Hundreds of prisoners were taken, and thousands of livestock were stolen.
1619, 1629, 1631, 1635	Crimean Tatars and their Nogai allies conducted raids on Circassian and Kabardian lands. The campaigns involved looting, violence, and the theft of vast amounts of livestock. Many prisoners were captured.
1640	A 14,000-strong Crimean army invaded Circassia and Kabarda. The Crimeans were defeated by the Circassians and retreated to Azov.
1653	A Crimean Tatar detachment arrived in Kabarda, taking away 130 boys and girls. They seized large numbers of horses, armor, sabers, and thousands of livestock.
1671	Crimean Tatars invaded Greater Kabarda, engaging in looting and stealing thousands of livestock. Fifty hostages were taken.
1674	A Crimean Tatar detachment arrived in Kabarda but was defeated by the Kabardians.
1688	A campaign by Crimean serasker Kazy-Girey against Kabarda resulted in destruction, prisoner-taking, and livestock theft. The Crimeans were eventually expelled by the Kabardians.
1699	Crimean kalga Shahbez Giray arrived in Kabarda with a military detachment. The Crimeans again engaged in devastation, taking prisoners and stealing livestock. In the home of Beslaney prince Temir-Bulat Kanokov, the Crimean kalga Shahbez Giray was killed. According to some accounts, he was poisoned, while others claim he was slain by rebelling Circassians.

=== 18th century ===
Year	Description
1700	Raid by Crimean prince Kaplan Giray on Circassia and Kabarda. The Crimeans devastated the lands, taking prisoners and stealing livestock.
1701	Second raid by Kaplan Giray on Circassia and Kabarda. The Crimean Tatars exacted heavy tribute and again ravaged Kabardian lands.
1703	A 60,000-strong army (according to other sources, 40,000) of Crimean Tatars and their allies under kalga Kazy Giray invaded Kabarda. The Crimeans and Nogais devastated the lands, looted, and captured locals. A general uprising erupted in Kabarda.
1704	Crimean Khan Ghazi Giray organized a new campaign against Kabarda, led by kalga Mengli Giray, who commanded a detachment of seimen (khan's guard). His mission was to collect yasyr (captives) and attempt to relocate Kabardian settlements beyond the Kuban River. The kalga was defeated.
1707	Raid by Crimean Tatars on Kabarda. The Crimeans engaged in devastation, looting, and tribute collection. Thousands of livestock and valuable weapons were seized. The Kabardians defeated the enemy.
1708	A multi-thousand Crimean-Turkish army under Khan Kaplan Giray invaded Kabarda. Several major battles occurred, the largest being the Kanzhal Battle. Kabardian princes led by senior prince-vali Kurghoqo Hatokhshoqo inflicted a crushing defeat. Casualties were estimated at 5,000 to 95,000.
1710	Raid by Crimean Tatars and Nogais on Circassia and Kabarda. Tribute was collected; large numbers of livestock and horses were stolen.
1711	A several-thousand-strong Crimean detachment attacked Circassian and Kabardian lands but was completely routed.
1711	A multi-thousand Crimean army with allies entered Circassia and Kabarda. During their retreat with spoils, Russian regiments pursued them, assisted by Kabardian cavalry. 22,000 were captured; 5,000 killed.
1712	Raid by Crimean Tatars and Nogais on Kabarda. The enemy ravaged lands, took prisoners, and stole livestock. The Crimeans were crushed during retreat.
1713	New raid by Crimeans and allies on Circassia and Kabarda. Devastation, captives, and theft of livestock/horses.
1714	Crimean Tatars raided Circassia and Kabarda. Heavy destruction and casualties. The enemy was defeated and retreated.
1715	Raid by Crimeans and allies into Kabarda. Devastation, captives, and livestock theft.
1716	Crimean Tatars invaded Circassia and Kabarda. Heavy human/material losses for Circassians, but Tatars retreated after fierce resistance.
1717	Raid on Kabarda by Crimean Tatars and Nogais. Human losses and material damage. Kabardians expelled the enemy.
1720	A 40,000-strong army of Crimean Khan Saadet Giray invaded Circassia and Kabarda—one of the largest invasions. The khan demanded "one yasyr per household" and relocation of Kabardians to Kuban. Kabardians refused tribute. Crimeans burned Kabardian lands.
1721	Kabardian princes defeated a Crimean Tatar detachment at the Nalchik River.
1722	New Crimean Tatar raid on Kabarda. Prince Qeytuqo Aslanbech wrote to Tsar Peter the Great: "We are in dire straits from Tatar raids, our hearts bleeding, besieged for three years".
1723	A multi-thousand Crimean force under Khan Kaplan Giray invaded Kabarda. Suffered brutal defeat—5,000 killed. The khan barely escaped.
1729	Kuban Tatars led by Bakhti Giray invaded Kabarda. Total defeat; the prince died.
1731	A 7,000-strong Crimean vanguard arrived in Kabarda and was defeated. Heavy casualties.
1731	Main forces ("200,000" with the khan's son) appeared at Kabarda's borders but withdrew after vanguard's defeat and Russian diplomacy.
1732	Crimean nurreddin led a 3,000-strong Crimean-Turkish detachment into Kabarda. Kabardians routed them; remnants fled fearing Russian troops.
1733	13,000+ Crimean Tatars/Nogais invaded Kabarda, surrounding 1,650 Cossacks. A 4,000-strong Kabardian cavalry rescued them.
1733	A 25,000-strong Crimean-Tatar army under kalga Fetih Giray devastated Kabarda.
1735	An 80,000-strong army under Khan Kaplan Giray (with Turks, Crimeans, and Nogais) occupied Kabarda. Kabardians/Russian troops, aided by Kalmyk governor Dondyk-Ombo, partially defeated and expelled them.
1737	Multi-thousand "Kuban" Tatar detachment (Crimean vassals) under Musa and Navruz-Lulu attacked Kabarda. Despite a plague hindering external aid, Kabardian princes repelled them.
1739	Invasion of Circassia/Kabarda by Crimean forces under kalga Fetih Giray and serasker Kazy Giray. 500 captives and 7,000 cattle taken. Prince Qeytuqo Aslanbech pursued and routed them despite numerical disadvantage, recovering all spoils.
1740	Raid by Kuban serasker on Circassia/Kabarda. Circassians defeated the enemy.
1744	Kuban serasker invaded Kabarda. Senior prince-vali Qeytuqo Aslanbech defeated them at the Laba River.
1747	Crimean Tatars under princes Kazy Giray and Shabaz Giray ravaged Kabarda, taking captives and spoils.
1749	Crimean Tatars again invaded Kabarda, looting and destroying.
1752	Crimean kalga Selim Giray entered Circassia with 12,000 troops planning to attack Kabarda. Kabardians mobilized; the enemy withdrew.
1754	A 5,000-strong Crimean detachment attacked Circassian/Kabardian lands but was defeated.
1755	Crimean kalga Shahin Giray (5,000 troops) marched against Circassia/Kabarda. "Most troops drowned in the Kuban River; others froze limbs or died".
1756	Raid by prince Selim Giray on Circassia/Kabarda. Expelled by Circassians.
1758	Ex-Kuban serasker Saadat Giray (15,000 troops) demanded Kabardians join his campaign against rebels. Refused, he withdrew.
1759	Crimean Khan Kerim Giray invaded under pretext of "mediating" Circassian princes. Retreated fearing Russian forces.
1759	10,000-strong army under Khan Kerim Giray re-entered Circassia/Kabarda, promising no yasyr if they submitted. Kabardians ignored.
1762	Crimean horde invaded Circassian/Kabardian lands. Crushing defeat: "Have Crimeans forgotten how we slaughtered them? [...] Many drowned fleeing—the khan's vizier's brother, two head murzas, many seimen".
1765	June: 4,000 Crimeans raided Kabarda but were repelled by Russian troops.
1768	Crimean forces under Kuban serasker Kazy Giray invaded, planning to raid Terek Cossack villages with Kabardians. Kabardians resisted.
1769	Crimean troops under Khan Kerim Giray and serasker Kazy Giray entered Pyatigorye region. Defeated at "Beshtau Mountains".
1774	Multi-thousand Turkish-Crimean army under Khan Devlet Giray and kalga Shahbaz Giray invaded Kabarda, besieging Mozdok. Russian troops with Kabardian cavalry crushed them at Beshtamak/Gundelen River.

== List of Circassian raids ==
=== 15th century ===
Year	Description
1498, 1499	Devastating campaigns by the Circassians against the Great Horde. "...the Circassians came against the Great Horde and reportedly killed very many Tatars of the Great Horde. And Khan Mahmat cannot survive against the Circassians, he... intends to cross to this side of the Don."

=== 16th century ===
Year	Description
1500	In 1500, Khan Sheikh Ahmed, who succeeded Sayid Muhammad, appealed to Meñli Giray for permission to relocate his Horde to the Dnieper, as "it is unsafe for us to roam beyond the Don, for many fight against us - the Nogais and the Circassians."
1501	In spring, the Circassians defeated the Beylerbey of Caffa.
1519	The Circassians defeated Kalga Bahadır Giray.
1522	Crimean Khan Mehmed I Giray died in a war "against the Circassians and Dadians".
1523	Siege of Bakhchisaray (capital of the Crimean Khanate) by Kabardian cavalry led by Talostan Dzhanhotov. The Crimean Khan was forced to sue for peace and pay large tribute to the Kabardians.
1525	Kabardian cavalry led by Idar, Andeimirqan, and Tkhemuj Janqot attacked Bakhchisaray and resulted in a victorious campaign bringing back great spoils, including 100 chariots packed with precious cloth.
1532	The Circassians stormed Astrakhan, deposed Khan Qasim and installed Aq Kubek of Astrakhan on the throne.
1546	The Circassians again captured Astrakhan, expelled Aq Kubek of Astrakhan and installed another puppet ruler - Yamghurchi

=== 17th century ===
Year	Description
1615	The Circassians attacked and plundered the settlements of the Kazy Nogais.
1619	The Besleney, Zhaney, and Temirgoy were prepared to fight against the Nogais.
1630	Sholokh Sunchalevich led his forces in attacks on Nogai nomadic camps, destroying settlements and stealing livestock.
1630	Mutsal Cherkassky with his regiment of 1,200 Kabardians and Terek Cossacks raided Nogai uluses near Azov. Avoiding the heavily fortified Azov, they destroyed the large Nogai ulus of Murza Shantemir on the Yeya River. The victors captured up to 7,000 prisoners, 6,000 cows and 2,000 sheep.
1670	The Circassians led by Prince Kaytukin invaded Crimea, withdrawing only after thoroughly plundering the entire peninsula.
1672-1673, 1675	Kasbulat Murzovich Cherkassky, leader of the Circassians, allied with Zaporozhian Cossacks, conducted several attacks on Crimea, liberating "Russian captives" and destroying a "Janissary corps". Kasbulat Cherkassky, allied with the Kalmyks, crushed the uluses of Nogai murza Karakasai. Kasbulat Cherkassky organized a new campaign against Crimea, invading at the head of a detachment of several thousand horsemen, with 800 Kabardian armored riders forming its core. The horsemen of Kasbulat Cherkassky crossed the Syvash and "at dawn attacked Crimean uluses". The detachment retreated through Perekop, where a battle occurred during the breakthrough from Crimea into the steppe: "Three Crimean sultans with warriors came against us... and we gave them battle and defeated them."

=== 18th century ===
Year	Description
1711	The Kabardians defeated the army of Kalga-Sultan Murad Giray.
1721	Qeytuqo Aslanbech conducted a raid against the Nogais.
1734	A major battle occurred in Lesser Kabarda between Russian and Kabardian forces on one side, and an Ottoman-Tatar army (supported by Kalmyks) on the other. While the Russians retreated, the Kabardian cavalry led by Magomed Kurgokin defeated the Crimeans and recaptured prisoners from the Greben Cossack villages.
1738	The Circassians crushed Tatar detachments led by Fetih Giray, reinforced by Nogais of Musa Mirza and remnants of Navruz Ulu's troops.
1739	Another battle occurred between Crimean Tatars and Circassians on the Laba River. The Circassians, led by Kabardian prince Kaytuko, defeated the army of Kalga-Sultan Kazy Giray: "...those Tatars were defeated and routed; many were killed or captured, and Sultan Kazy Giray was mortally wounded."
1746	Khan Selim I Giray complained in a letter to Don Cossack Ataman Danila Efremov: "..for a year now, the Bzhedugs have been raiding the Khanate."
1769	Crimean troops under Khan Qırım Giray and Kuban Serasker Ghazi Giray entered Kabarda, the Pyatigorye region. The Circassians crushed the Tatar forces "near Beshtau Mountains".
