= Jambolet of Kabardia =

18th-century Circassian prince

Jambolet Qeytuqo

Grand Prince of Kabardia
- Reign: 1749–1753
- Predecessor: Batoqo Bechmirza
- Successor: Bemat Kurghoqo
- Born: Unknown; Kabardia
- Died: After 1769; Kabardia
- Issue: Sons: Qeytuqo, Yislam
Names
- Jambolet, son of Qeytuqo
- Kabardian: Къетыкъуэ и къуэ Джамболат
- House: Inalid dynasty; House of Jambot; House of Qeytuqo
- Father: Qeytuqo Jambot
- Religion: Sunni Islam

Jambolet Qeytuqo (Kabardian: Къетыкъуэ Жамболэт) was an 18th-century Circassian prince and the Grand Prince of Kabardia from 1749 to 1753. A prominent figure of the Qeytuqo lineage, he played a leading role in the political life of Kabardia during a period marked by intense feudal fragmentation, blood feuds, and escalating rivalry between the Tsardom of Russia and the Crimean Khanate.

Throughout his political life, Jambolet navigated complex alliances between the rival Bakhsan and Kashkatau factions within Kabardia. Although he maintained formal diplomatic ties with Russian imperial authorities and received an imperial stipend, he frequently resisted tsarist encroachment, harbored exiled Crimean royals, and maintained close ties with the Crimean Khanate. His tenure as Grand Prince concluded in 1753 with the formal partition of Greater Kabardia into two distinct administrative units, which weakened the central authority of the Senior Prince. In 1769, Jambolet joined a faction of Kabardian nobles who renounced allegiance to Russia and retreated to the Eshkakon tract in open defiance of imperial authorities, marking his final appearance in historical records.

== Early life ==
Jambolet supported his older brother Aslanbech Qeytuqo in all matters, accompanying him to Crimea and participating alongside him in the Kuban campaigns and skirmishes against the Misosts and Hatokhshoqos during the Kabardian Civil War. However, unlike his brother, Jambolet never took up arms against the Tsardom of Russia.

At the end of August 1720, the princes Aslanbech, Tatarkhan Bechmirza, Qanamat Qeytuqo, and Jambolet wrote to the assessors of the Ambassadorial Prikaz, M. P. Shafirov and M. R. Larionov, describing an attack on their lands by the Crimean Khan. The Crimeans threatened to "cut everyone down" and destroy their grain crops and mown hay. "And we sit in the siege," the letter states, "in our city. At first, we have hope in his God and in the great sovereign, but apart from them, we have no one."

Around that time, Sadetjeriy and Belchuga traveled to Peter I in St. Petersburg, bearing a written assurance of loyalty to Russia and declaring their readiness "to lay down their heads for him, the great sovereign."

The feudal lords recognized Jambolet's seniority among the Qeytuqos only after Aslanbech's death. A letter dated October 21, 1748, states:

"Before this, when the Baksan rulers and the Dzhanbulatov children were at odds, and Roslan-bek Kaitukin and his lords resided on the Kuma River, his subjects, the Seken inhabitants and the Abazins, migrated to the Kuban region, and in their former residences, the Kabardians sowed grain."

The document further notes that during this period, Kuban Tatars arrived and "having committed much robbery, they drove away several horses from the herd of the bridle of Dzhezhukov's [Doguzhuqo's] son, for which reason the said bridle was sent to the Kuban serasker." Ultimately, only half of the stolen livestock was returned.

Sources, including a June 1747 note by General Devits, indicate that the Doguzhuqos served as the uzdens (vassals) of Jambolet Qeytuqo.

Following Aslanbech's death, his inheritance passed directly to Jambolet.

Historian V. N. Sokurov notes that Jambolet fostered the son of Crimean Khan Arslan Giray, the future Devlet IV Giray.

During a meeting of the khasa (council), the princes Jambolet, Batoqo Bechmirza, and Bemat Kurghoqo swore on the Quran an oath of mutual allegiance, agreeing that any conflict with Qasey Hatokhshoqo would require their joint consent.

In the autumn of 1746, Batoqo Bechmirza was elected senior prince of Kabardia. However, due to renewed internecine strife, he was exiled from Kabardia, as Qasey and Bemat of the Baksan faction had been before him. Batoqo's departure occurred in February 1748 following a personal quarrel with his cousin, Jambolet Qeytuqo.

== Reign ==
In 1749, Jambolet assumed the position of Grand Prince of Kabardia by right of seniority.

Despite temporary alliances, the struggle for political influence and territorial control among Kabardian landowners persisted throughout his reign. A reconciliation had previously occurred in 1746 between Bemat Kurghoqo and the Bechmirza faction. However, a report by General Devits dated June 28, 1747, notes unsuccessful negotiations between Bemat and Jambolet in the Kyzburun tract, as well as a plot by Hamirza Qeytuqo, son of Aslanbech Qeytuqo, to assassinate his uncle Jambolet.

Internecine strife was exacerbated by the prevailing tradition of blood feuds, making political murders common. Aslanbech had previously killed his own nephew, while Qasey's cousin, Pshiapshoqo, was also slain. Qasey himself was held responsible for the murder of Aslanbech's brother, Qanamat; as a result, Aslanbech's clan repeatedly sought revenge, leading to an incident in which Qasey was shot with an arquebus. Prior to Qasey's wounding, Batjeriy Hatokhshoqo had also killed his brother, Ismel Yislam.

On October 10, 1749, Russian Chancellor A. P. Bestuzhev-Ryumin addressed a letter to Jambolet, Bemat, Karamirza Aliy, Hamirza, and other Kabardian princes regarding their reconciliation with Qasey and the payment of their imperial stipends, urging them to halt their internal feuds:

"You, Dzhambulat-bek and Kasai-bek, have already had ample opportunity to experience the disaster that discord and internecine strife bring, since not only were you yourselves forced to leave your fatherland for a considerable time, but your subordinates also suffered great ruin in the meantime, as did all the other Kabardian rulers... From previous examples, it is known that quarrels and mutual disagreements not only do not bring you any good, but obviously lead to extreme ruin. For this reason, according to what you have shown, I always remain unwavering in my regard for His Imperial Majesty's loyalty... now all your quarrels, which are harmful to you, have ceased with a beneficial peace. Both you and Kasai-bek are still in your homeland and in your home safely. Now all that remains is for all of you, rulers of Kabarda, to enjoy this peace and good rest."

On April 21, 1751, State Councilor Ivan Barkovsky reported to Astrakhan Governor I. O. Brylkin concerning a diplomatic trip to Kabardia aimed at mediation. Barkovsky noted the need to investigate rumors that the Qeytuqos intended to defect to the Crimean Khanate. Three envoys, two from the Eteshkul Horde and one from Sultan Kazy-Giray, had arrived in Kabardia and were staying with Hamirza. According to some reports, the envoys requested military escorts for the Eteshkul Horde's migration to the upper Kuban; according to other accounts:

"...their masters are summoning them along with all of Kabarda, so that they can reside in the heights of the Kuban and be united with them. The children of the Crimean Khan live in Kabarda with Hamurza and Dzhambulat, who are wreaking considerable havoc on Kabarda. And the residents of both parties, both Kashkatau and Bakhsan, bring complaints; they rob captives, horses, and cattle, sending it all to Crimea and the Kuban..."

In 1753, the leaders of the Kashkatau faction and their followers swore an oath of allegiance to Russia on the Quran. Reporting this event, Barkovsky detailed the extent of Jambolet's domain along the Psygansu, Cherek, Kheu, Nalchik, Kenzhe, and Shalushka rivers, which encompassed 25 villages in total.

On June 19, 1753, the princes of the Bakhsan faction petitioned Empress Elizabeth to forcibly resettle their Kashkatau rivals, as Jambolet's clan had relocated from the Bakhsan area to a position near the Shalushka River. Bemat, his brothers, Qasey, and Karamirza expressed fear of renewed hostilities, adding in a postscript:

"...The Dzhambulatov family has disobeyed Your Majesty's decree, and the majors who are here have informed us that Don and Kalmyk troops are to be sent to us, but have not yet been sent; therefore, we most humbly request that that army be sent to us immediately; for the Dzhanbulatov family, having not seen such an army, will not carry out the decree of Your Majesty."

Russian imperial policy during this period aimed to maintain stability along the Caucasian border and prevent open warfare among the Kabardian princes, as evidenced by imperial decrees, Bestuzhev-Ryumin's diplomatic letters, and the administrative actions of Barkovsky and Tatarov.

Jambolet's tenure as Grand Prince concluded with the formal political partition of Greater Kabardia in 1753. The territory was split into two distinct administrative units, Kashkatau and Bakhsan, which significantly curtailed the centralized authority of the Grand Prince.

== Later life ==
On March 19, 1761, Jambolet Qeytuqo and his relatives submitted a formal complaint regarding the princes of the Bakhsan faction, who had driven them from their homes.

In May 1761, Jambolet lodged another complaint with Astrakhan Governor V. V. Neronov concerning the actions of Bemat and Qasey, who had forcibly seized 15 villages from the Qeytuqos and transferred them to the Bechmirza faction.

Governor Neronov subsequently wrote to Bemat Kurghoqo and Qasey Hatokhshoqo regarding the matter:

"Knowing perfectly well that you yourselves, in the presence of special persons sent from His Imperial Majesty, the honorable gentlemen Majors Barkovsky and Tatarov, have recognized it as beneficial and confirmed by oaths that you will live in Bakhsan, and the Kashkatau owners in Kashkatau, and the Chegem River has been designated as a border between you, so that neither one nor the other can cross it on either side and drive cattle, and all the quarrels that have taken place have been stopped and consigned to oblivion... But with all this, disagreement has now again emerged, which is very contrary to His Imperial Majesty, especially now by itself, without the will of His Imperial Majesty. You dare to drive them, the Kashkatau owners, out of their dwelling, contrary to the high orders and your confirmed oath, which is not at all beneficial or suitable for anything..."

A report from the Collegium of Foreign Affairs also outlined the ongoing territorial disputes:

"The former Crimean owner, Dzhanbulat Kaitukin, returned to his home three months ago, and his residence had been transferred to the Kumu River for shared living with other owners even before his arrival by Hamurza Raslanbekov. Dzhanbulat Kaitukin had complained to all the owners about his house being transferred to the Kumu River, and was very dissatisfied with it. And now it is being spread throughout Kabarda that he, Dzhanbulat, intends to resettle again to his former place next spring."

Historical records note that in June 1769, Jambolet Qeytuqo joined other members of the Kashkatau faction in protesting the policies of the tsarist administration. Renouncing their allegiance to Russia, they withdrew alongside their uzdens to the Eshkakon tract, where tsarist troops were ultimately deployed against them. This event marks the final mention of Jambolet in contemporary official records.
