= Kuban campaigns (1736–1739) =

Kuban Campaigns
- Part of Russo-Turkish War (1735–1739) and Crimean–Circassian wars
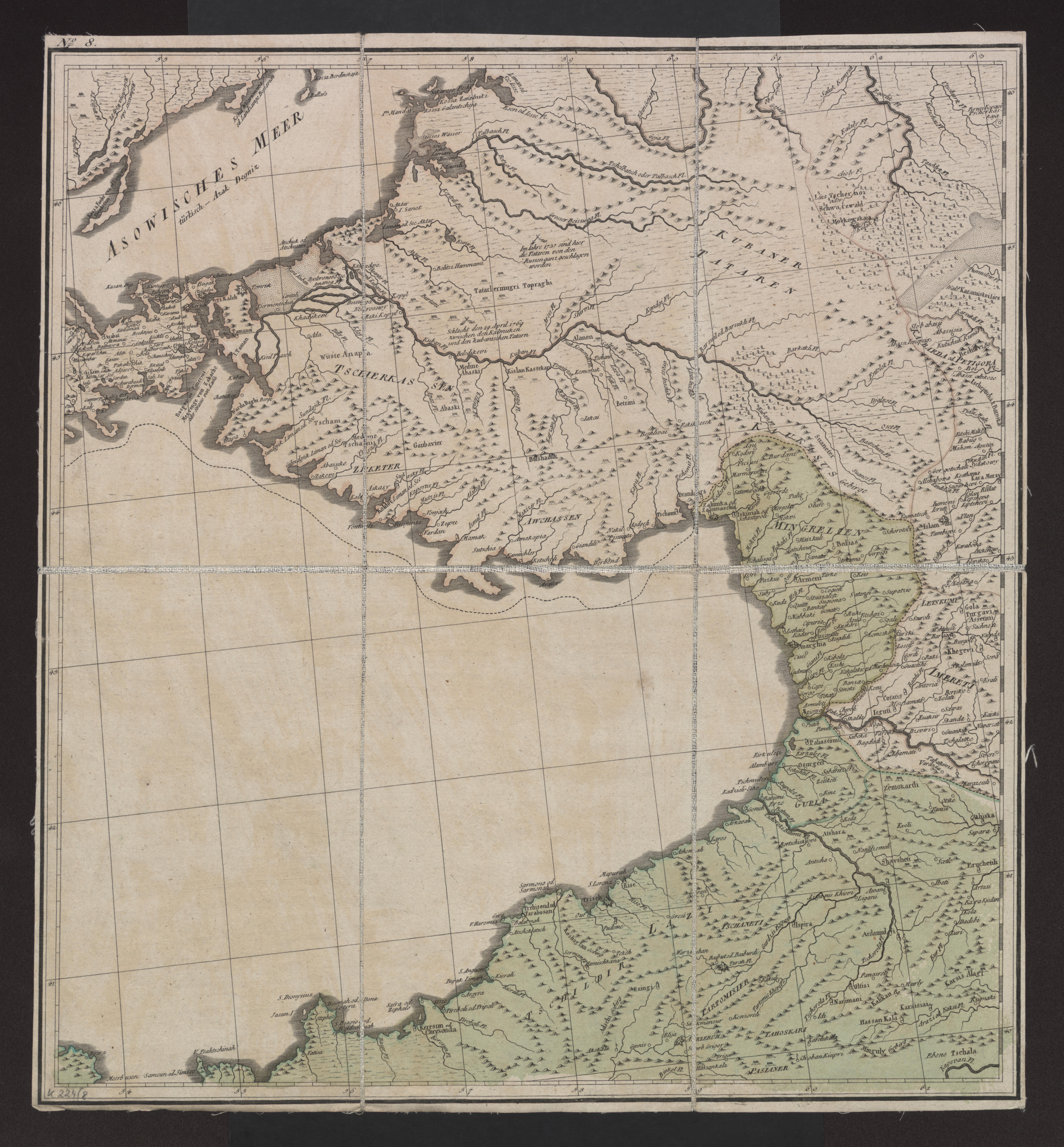
- 18th century map of Kuban
Date	1736–1739
Location	Kuban
Result	Kalmyk–Cossack–Kabardian victory

Belligerents
Russian Empire; Don Cossacks; Terek Cossacks; Kalmyk Khanate; Kabardia	Crimean Khanate; Lesser Nogai Horde

Commanders and leaders
(Russian Empire) Danila Efremov (Russian Empire) Ivan Krasnoshchekov (Russian Empire) Ivan Frolov; Donduk-Ombo; Galdan-Normo; Darzha (POW); Aslanbech the Red-Mustached; Karamirza Aliy; Qasey Hatokhshoqo; Bemat Kurghoqo	(Crimean Khanate) Batura Azamat San-Mirza † (Crimean Khanate) Arslan-Mirza (Crimean Khanate) Kara-Ulu-Mus (surrendered) (Crimean Khanate) Bek-Ulu-Mus (surrendered) (Crimean Khanate) Kazi-Girey †

Strength
First campaign: 22,000; 4,000; 2,000; Second campaign: 25,000; Third campaign: 15,000; 11,000	First campaign: (Crimean Khanate) 8,000 wagons

Casualties and losses
First campaign: "Significant"; 421 killed, 783 wounded Second campaign: 2 killed, 20 wounded	First campaign: 30,000 killed, 10,000–20,000 captured Second campaign: 30,000 (15,000 killed in action, 10,000 civilians captured) Third campaign: 15,000 killed, 5,000 drowned, 10,000 captured Total: (Crimean Khanate) 100,000–110,000 killed or captured (Russian claim, including civilians)

The Kuban campaigns (1736–1739) were a series of coordinated military operations conducted during the Russo-Turkish War (1735–1739) in the North Caucasus and the Kuban. They involved Russian imperial forces, Kalmyk contingents under Donduk-Ombo, and allied Cossack and Kabardian detachments acting against the Nogai hordes and Crimean-Tatar-aligned groups in the steppe frontier.

The campaigns formed part of Russia’s broader strategy to secure its southern borders and weaken Ottoman and Crimean influence in the North Caucasus. Fighting took place across the Kuban basin, including river valleys such as the Kuban, Laba, Yeya, and adjacent steppe zones. The operations were characterized by large-scale mobile warfare, shifting alliances among regional powers, and repeated incursions into Nogai-controlled territories.

By the end of the campaigns, significant portions of the Kuban steppe population had been displaced or subordinated, and Russian influence in the region was strengthened, although control remained contested in the broader frontier zone.

== Background ==
Following the unsuccessful Pruth campaign of 1711, which ended with the signing of a peace treaty unfavorable to Russia, Peter the Great was forced to cede to the Ottoman Empire the territories previously conquered during the Azov campaigns of 1695–1696, including the fortresses of Azov and Taganrog. Peter I almost immediately began preparations for a new war, but his death led to these plans being postponed. The Russo-Turkish War (1735–1739) was the result of Russia's prolonged expansion into the southwestern lands. Russia officially declared war on the Ottoman Empire on April 12, 1736, but by that time the Russian army had already been besieging the fortress of Azov since March. A work by H. G. Manstein indicates that the St. Petersburg court in 1736 was not content with merely attacking the Porte in Crimea and besieging Azov; it also sought to subdue the Kuban Nogais, and to this end ordered Donduk-Ombo to attack them.

According to the study by K. P. Shovunov, Essays on the Military History of the Kalmyks (17th–19th Centuries), based on archival materials, during the four years of the war Donduk-Ombo annually formed an army of up to 40,000 men. However, this figure may be somewhat overstated, as it contradicts the demographic capabilities of the Kalmyk Khanate: according to generally accepted estimates, in 1733 the total number of kibitkas in the khanate did not exceed 55,000. The actual conscription and formation of units among the Kalmyks took place in the following manner: in the uluses this was carried out by taishis, in the aimaks by zaisangs, and in the khotons by akhaa (elders). In the works of U. B. Ochirov, it is noted that the formation of military contingents among the Kalmyks was generally carried out under the leadership of the khan, who determined their internal structure, command staff, armament, and other key aspects of organization. It can be assumed that during the reign of Donduk-Ombo, rules already existed that were later enshrined in the “laws of Donduk-Dashi,” including strict discipline and fines for failure to appear for campaign or unauthorized withdrawal. The army retained the traditional decimal system (tens, hundreds, and thousands), where command was exercised by noins (large detachments) and zaisangs (hundreds and thousands), while units of ten were led by commoners.

The Kalmyks were mobilized according to the kibitka principle: one equipped warrior was sent from every two or three kibitkas, while the remaining men supported the families of those who had gone on campaign. They fought in rotation, and even those incapable of service (such as the blind or disabled) were required to provide a substitute. On March 28, 1736, the Kalmyk ruler Donduk-Ombo received an imperial charter demanding a military contingent. He equipped 3,000 men and sent them to the troops of Lieutenant General A. I. Rumyantsev. Following this, a new letter was sent to Donduk-Ombo on March 29. In it, the Astrakhan governor I. P. Izmailov reported that, on the orders of Empress Anna Ioannovna, Donduk-Ombo was required to lead a campaign against the Kuban with his entire army.

In the spring of 1736, the Kalmyk army prepared to advance into the Kuban. However, in accordance with the Kalmyk–Crimean treaty, Donduk-Ombo first issued an official declaration of war to the Kuban Nogais, which effectively served as a warning of the impending invasion. According to information received in Tsaritsyn, during the winter of 1735–1736, and even before the campaign, Donduk-Ombo repeatedly sent envoys to the Kuban Nogais with this announcement. Many Kuban inhabitants followed this advice, which, according to eyewitnesses, allowed them to avoid major losses during the spring Kalmyk invasion. Donduk-Ombo's formal declaration of war was delivered to the Kuban by the Crimean Tatar Tugul Darkhan, accompanied by six Kalmyks. The message was delivered specifically to the Nogai tribe of Hatay-Kipchak. Its main content was a warning about the outbreak of the Russo-Turkish War and the impending Kalmyk campaign. Since Russian troops had not yet arrived, Donduk-Ombo advised the Kuban population to flee as quickly as possible. This action was consistent with Kalmyk foreign policy traditions of the time. As early as 1711, on the eve of the Russo-Turkish War (1710–1711), the Kalmyk Khan Ayuka informed the Astrakhan Oberkommandant M. I. Chirikov of the existence of a Kalmyk–Crimean peace agreement. However, in the event of a Russo-Turkish war, this treaty was to be terminated by mutual consent.

== Campaigns ==
=== First campaign ===
On April 12, 1736, Russia officially declared war on the Ottoman Empire, although Russian troops had already begun the siege of the Turkish fortress of Azov in March. The Kalmyk army set out on April 3, and, as Khansha Jan reported in a letter, the Kalmyks traversed the distance from the Lake Sarpa to the Kuban in exactly 21 days. He also reported that, despite the defensive measures taken by the Kuban rulers Batura Azamat San-Mirza, Arslan-Mirza, and others, Donduk-Ombo managed to defeat them completely and take their wives and children captive.

According to other information obtained from the Kalmyk uluses, the first military clash between the Kalmyks and the Kuban forces occurred in the upper reaches of the Orpa River, located 100 miles from the Kuban. There, in a forested area, the Kalmyks discovered and defeated a Kuban Nogai ulus numbering 3,000 wagons. All the mirzas and the male population of this ulus were killed, and 10,000 women and children were captured. P. G. Butkov's Materials reports that the first to suffer from Donduk-Ombo's army were the Nogai tribe of Navruz-ulu, numbering 5,000 wagons. These Kuban Nogais failed to escape the Kalmyks in time and, in the area between the Kuban and Orpa rivers, constructed a fortification consisting of three rows of carts and oxen. Remaining near the Kuban, Donduk-Ombo sent his son, Galdan-Normo, at the head of a 20,000-strong force against the Nogai camp. The Kalmyks were forced to storm it, attacking on foot from all sides. Despite losses, the Nogai camp was completely destroyed, and all its male defenders were killed, including Batyr-Azamat, described as “a nobleman of the entire Kuban Horde,” along with 23 mirzas. Nogai losses amounted to 6,000 people, while 421 were killed and 783 wounded on the Kalmyk side.

After the initial clash, Donduk-Ombo stationed his main force of 22,000 men in the upper reaches of the Yegorlyk River, near the Kuban, where he allowed his troops to rest after the long march and awaited the arrival of 4,000 Don Cossacks led by Ivan Krasnoshchekov, as well as Kabardian rulers with their forces. According to the plan, they were to join forces, cross the Kuban, and invade the main territory of the Kuban Horde. Some Kuban mirzas, such as Bek-Ulu-Mus and Kara-Ulu-Mus, having learned of the arrival of the Kalmyk army, took up positions in the upper reaches of the Indzhik River. However, they hastened to send envoys to Donduk-Ombo, agreeing to accept Russian allegiance. The Kalmyk ruler sent representatives to these mirzas with the condition that they avoid the devastation of their uluses by immediately submitting to the Empress's rule.

During a period of rest, reconnaissance units reported that four Nogai uluses of the Saltan-Ulu tribe, numbering approximately 30,000 wagons, were located 160 versts from the Kalmyk camp. Donduk-Ombo immediately decided to advance in that direction. Having fortified themselves in an inaccessible position, the Nogais refused to engage in negotiations. Their strong defensive position forced the Kalmyks into a protracted siege. The arrival on May 20 of Don and Terek Cossacks led by the military elder Ivan Krasnoshchekov, together with a 2,000-strong Kabardian detachment led by Aslanbech the Red-Mustached, Bemat Kurghoqo, and Qasey Hatokhshoqo, dramatically changed the situation, and the combined forces went on the offensive. During continuous attacks, on the 37th day of the siege, the Kuban mirzas were forced to negotiate, agreeing to accept Russian allegiance. Two hundred Nogai mirzas from four families, along with their sultan, signed a written oath of allegiance and gave their sons as hostages. The mirzas also received assurances from the Russian side that after the war they would remain under Russian protection and would not be handed over to the Ottomans. The Nogai rulers were ordered to migrate to the regions along the Terek River, Malka, and Kuma rivers, near the Russian frontier, where they immediately began to move.

According to Donduk-Ombo, he took four individuals from four Nogai families as hostages and handed them over to Danila Efremov. These Nogais also pledged to migrate to Kabardia and pay tribute to Donduk-Ombo, as they had previously paid to his grandfather, Ayuka Khan. Despite this success, not all Kuban Nogais were subdued, and Empress Anna Ioannovna ordered the continuation of the campaign. The southward advance of Donduk-Ombo's army led to the Nogai tribe of Kazbulat-Ulu surrendering without resistance. Only after this did the Kalmyks return to their uluses.

=== Aftermath ===
When the Russian army besieging Azov received news of the successful actions of the Kalmyks, Kabardians, and Cossacks in the Kuban in May, it sparked general rejoicing among the troops. Field Marshal P. P. Lassi reported in his Journal of Military Operations during the Siege of the Azov Fortress that he learned of the victory on May 7, during which 30,000 “nomadic Tatars” were killed and up to 10,000 captured. According to P. G. Butkov, in total about 20,000 women and children were taken prisoner by the Kalmyks.

This news had a demoralizing effect on the defenders of the Turkish fortress and deprived them of their last hope of assistance from the Kuban Nogais. On June 19, the Azov pasha surrendered the fortress to Field Marshal P. P. Lassi. As a result of the Kalmyk spring campaign, the Russian army's Azov operation was crowned with success. St. Petersburg highly praised the Kalmyks' military contribution at the beginning of the campaign and commended their “notable actions against the Kuban people.” Empress Anna Ioannovna, by a decree of August 11, ordered that Donduk-Ombo receive annually, for life, an additional 2,500 rubles and 1,000 quarters of rye flour, in addition to his previous salary. Other Kalmyk nobles also received annual allowances: Dorji Nazarov and his children received 600 rubles; Bokshurga, Galdan-Normo, and Cheter received 300 rubles; Solom-Dorji received 200 rubles; and Lekbey, Serbet, and Batu received 100 rubles each.

By the same decree, Donduk-Ombo and other Kalmyk rulers were required to continue the campaign and send a strong corps to Crimea. Donduk-Ombo learned from Nogai captives that his spring campaign had achieved limited long-term results, as the Nogais continued to roam the Kuban, harvest grain, and prepare supplies for winter. Moreover, they were actively preparing for raids against the Don. A Kuban captive also informed the Kalmyks about the retreat of Minikh's Russian army from Crimea.

=== Second campaign ===
==== Prelude ====
On September 20, Don elder Danila Efremov reported to Tsaritsyn that Donduk-Ombo was preparing to set out with an army from the uluses (regions) on a new Kuban campaign in early October, together with the Don Cossacks. By decree of the Empress, 3,000 Cossacks were to march with the Kalmyks in the Kuban direction. In September, Donduk-Ombo again dispatched a 15-man reconnaissance detachment toward the Kuban region to capture "tongues" (prisoners for intelligence). However, the mission failed, as the detachment was completely annihilated in a clash with Kuban forces. Only the Kalmyk Darzha was captured and soon transported to Crimea.

He was granted an audience with the Crimean Khan, who sent him back with a letter to Donduk-Ombo, delivered in late November. In it, the new Crimean Khan, Fetih II Giray, reminded Donduk-Ombo that during his earlier flight from the Volga he had found refuge in Kuban under the protection of the Crimean Khan and had sworn an oath “not to cause them, the Crimeans and Kubans, any harm.” The Khan reproached him for violating this oath and advised him to abandon his attempts to attack the Khan’s subjects. Donduk-Ombo’s response was harsh, essentially stating that although he had once been forced to wander on Crimean lands, he had done so only “to save his life.” Preparations for the campaign proceeded extremely slowly, as the threat of a Kazakh raid continued to loom, and the departure of most of the Kalmyk male population for war led to the decline and ruin of local farms.

In October, Donduk-Ombo was forced to resume preparations for the Kuban campaign under constant pressure from the Russian government and the Don Cossacks. Rumors circulated within the army that two Kazakh envoys had been captured en route to Kuban, allegedly carrying news that the Kazakhs were prepared to join Kuban forces against the Kalmyk uluses. However, according to Kalmyk informants in Tsaritsyn, these rumors were deliberately spread by Donduk-Ombo himself “to use as excuses for not going on a Kuban campaign.” At the same time, news of the withdrawal of Minikh’s Russian army from Crimea seriously alarmed the Kalmyks, who in these changed circumstances were reluctant to completely break relations with the Kuban Nogais. On October 8, members of Donduk-Ombo’s reconnaissance party, previously defeated and captured by Kuban forces, returned from captivity.

Around this time, certain Kuban mirzas (or possibly entire uluses), located on the left banks of the Kuban and Laba rivers, sent letters to Donduk-Ombo requesting to enter his allegiance, stating that they could not resist “him, Donduk-Ombo, and the Russian people.” This effectively became the signal for the Kalmyk army to begin its march toward Kuban. Given the continued threat of a Kazakh attack, Donduk-Ombo ordered that the Kuban campaign be conducted swiftly and completed within two months.

==== Campaign ====
No information on the Kalmyk autumn–winter campaign in Kuban in 1736 has been found in the materials of the National Archives of the Republic of Kalmykia. According to P. G. Butkov, the Don Cossacks, led by Colonels Danila Efremov and Ivan Krasnoshchekov, joined the Kalmyk army along the way, bringing the combined force to approximately 25,000 men. On November 19, the united Kalmyk–Cossack army set out for Kuban, and by November 30 they had reached the Yegorlyk River. A Kalmyk reconnaissance detachment sent ahead discovered the nomadic Yedishkul Nogais in the area between the Kuban and Laba rivers, one of the most powerful Nogai hordes, capable of fielding up to 20,000 cavalry, which had avoided destruction during the spring campaign by remaining in mountainous areas.

Due to a lack of forage, the Nogais were forced to move their herds to the right bank of the Kuban and constructed fortifications in difficult terrain to defend their uluses. The Kalmyk–Don command deployed a large detachment of Don Cossacks as a forward reconnaissance force, while the main Kalmyk cavalry covered the rear. During a night assault between December 1 and 2, the Don Cossacks captured the forward Kuban fortification, whose garrison of approximately one thousand men was almost entirely destroyed, except for the commander, who was sent to the Kalmyk camp for interrogation. Cossack losses were minimal: one esaul and one ensign were killed, and around 20 Cossacks were wounded.

After obtaining intelligence on the disposition of the Kuban Nogais, Donduk-Ombo launched a coordinated offensive, dividing his army into several detachments of roughly equal strength, which attacked simultaneously from multiple directions and achieved a decisive victory.

Donduk-Ombo’s forces advanced across the Kuban region to the Sea of Azov, devastating the Kuban Horde. The fortress of Kopyl, the residence of the Kuban serasker, was captured and destroyed, while Nekrasov Cossacks living nearby fled into the mountains. Attempts to persuade them to return to their “native lands” failed, and as a warning, one of their settlements was burned. The campaign lasted approximately two weeks, from December 1 to 14, and according to Donduk-Ombo himself, it was his greatest victory. Nogai losses were extremely heavy, estimated at around 30,000 people, including 15,000 killed in battle, with many others drowning while attempting to cross the flooded Kuban River. The Kalmyks captured significant spoils, including around 20,000 horses, large quantities of livestock, and over 10,000 Nogai women and children taken captive.

After sending a portion of the spoils back to his uluses, Donduk-Ombo established a fortified camp along the Kuban rather than immediately returning. Upon learning of the approach of a 3,000-strong Kuban force, he dispatched a Kalmyk detachment to intercept it, which decisively defeated the enemy.

=== Third Campaign ===
On 1737, Don Cossack regiments, joined by the Kalmyk army of Donduk-Ombo, were ordered to advance to the Kuban and defeat the enemy. On November 30, 1737, Frolov's 11,000 Don Cossacks crossed the Don River and headed for the Yeya River. On December 1, they were joined by a detachment of 15,000 Kalmyks from Donduk-Ombo. On December 7, an advance detachment of Cossacks and Kalmyks marched to the Chelbasy River. Ahead of the detachment were 200 Cossacks and 200 Kalmyks for reconnaissance. On December 8, Ataman Frolov's Cossacks, Kalmyks, and Tatars who had previously accepted Russian citizenship, crossed the Kuban River. About a thousand Tatar tents were destroyed, and much livestock was captured. The Nekrasovites, who lived in remote areas, suffered almost no harm. Only on one island was their town of Khan-Tyube burned down and several hundred head of cattle stolen. Nogai losses included 15,000 killed, 5,000 drowned, and 10,000 captured; 1,000 wagons, 20,000 horses, and 5,000 cows were captured. On December 14, the Cossacks and Kalmyks returned to the Yeya.

Here is how the famous Kuban historian Fyodor Shcherbina describes these events in his book “History of the Kuban Cossack Army”:

More detailed information about the campaign of Russian and Kalmyk troops in the Kuban region is contained in a report from the Governing Senate to the Collegium of War dated December 27, 1737. The combined forces, having arrived in the Kuban region, encountered the Edeshkul Tatar horde, which occupied the Multan Peninsula from Kopyl to the shores of the Black Sea and Sea of Azov. Among other settlements, the Don Cossacks and Kalmyks captured the Tatar capital of Kopyl, "which is of considerable size and surrounded by a rampart," razed it "to the ground," and seized much booty. From November 26 to December 3, all available males bearing arms were massacred, and only a few escaped by flight or drowned while crossing the Kuban River, "with up to ten thousand women and children taken captive, and even more drowned in the Kuban River." The Kalmyks of Donduk-Omba alone took 20,000 horses, "and countless cattle and sheep," since all the livestock from the Kuban region had likely been driven there. Likewise, the Cossacks and Kalmyks "obtained such abundance and rich spoils in other things that they had not seen anything like it for ages." Thus dearly was the Circassian and Tatar raid on the Don villages purchased.

After this campaign discord arose among the Nekrasovites: some of them wanted to return to Russia on the condition that their past crimes be forgiven. Fyodor Shcherbina cites the testimony of one of the captives: Nekrasovite Yakov Polyak, or Korzhikhin, a native of the Polish town of Rychvol, who fled his homeland first to the Zaporizhian Sich and from there to join the Nekrasov Cossacks. Before the arrival of Russian troops, Yakov sought means to escape to the Don and fled, taking advantage of their arrival on Multan Island. According to the fugitive, the Nekrasov Cossacks and Tatars were warned in advance by the local serasker of the possibility of a Russian attack. The Nekrasov Cossacks, abandoning their homes, moved to the islands and beyond the swamps. From there, if the Kuban River were to freeze over, they intended to flee further into the mountains. The Nekrasovites numbered up to seven hundred men, not including women and children, and could field up to 500 warriors. The poor were inclined to flee to Russia and kept their intentions secret; the majority, including the wealthy and powerful, were against escape, convinced that "the Russian Empress would never forgive them for their guilt and, upon their arrival on the Don, would order them all hanged." Therefore, the Cossacks kept a close eye on one another and immediately handed over to the Tatar authorities those they suspected of intending to flee to the Russians, who then sold them to the Circassians in the mountains. That same year, fifteen Zaporozhian Cossacks in the Nekrasovites' employ wanted to escape by boat to the sea and from there to the Don, but the Nekrasovites betrayed them to the Tatar Sultan, who sold them to the mountains and Crimea. In this way, the Nekrasovites kept Russia's supporters in fear and obedience

=== Fourth campaign ===
An important event in 1738 was the return of the Abaza to Kabardia, who had been forcibly resettled in 1721–1722 by Khan Saadet IV Giray. During this action, two Kabardian princes, Bemat Kurghoqo and Karamirza Aliy, together with Donduk-Ombo, proceeded to Kuban, conquered ulus of Musa-Murza and the Abaza Circassians. In the spring of 1739, the Kabardians, along with the Kalmyks who had voluntarily joined them, launched a campaign against Kuban. They were led by Aslanbech the Red-Mustached. In December, he reported to St. Petersburg that, with the Kalmyk Khan Ombo, they went beyond the Laba River. And to the top of the Khevz River. They took five thousand Bezlaya villages and two thousand Begbai villages. In the summer of the same year, when the Crimeans, having unexpectedly attacked Kabardia, along with the Chemguy Circassians, attacked Kabardian summer pastures, capturing 500 people and seizing about 200,000 sheep and 7,000 cattle.

However, shortly after the Ottoman defeat at the Battle of Stavuchany on August 17, the Kabardian and Kalmyk forces mounted a counterattack. On August 20, they confronted Kazi-Girey's forces near the Laba River. In the ensuing battle, the Crimean-led forces were defeated; many were killed or captured, and Kazi-Girey himself was mortally wounded.

== Sources ==
- Tepkeev, Vladimir T. (2020). "Kalmyk Cavalry in the Russo-Turkish War of 1735–1739: Campaign of 1736" (PDF). Bylye Gody. 57 (3). doi:10.13187/bg.2020.3.1003.
- Muzraev, N. L. (2025). Мобилизация и участие калмыков на начальном этапе Русско-турецкой войны 1735 – 1739 гг. [Mobilization and participation of the Kalmyks at the Initial Stage of the Russo-Turkish War of 1735-1739]. Oriental Studies (in Russian). doi:10.54770/20729286-2025-4-91.
