= Hatokhshoqo II of Kabardia =

Hatokhshoqo Misost
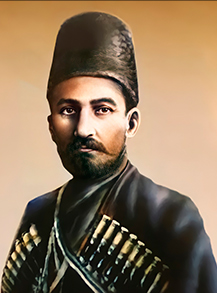
- Modern depiction of Hatokhshoqo Misost

Grand Prince of Kabardia
- Reign: 1709/1710 – 1721
- Predecessor: Kurghoqo Hatokhshoqo
- Successor: Yislambech Misost
- Born: 17th century Kabardia
- Died: 1721; Kabardia
- Issue: Muhamad (Note: Kabardian: Мухьэмэд Russian: Магомед); Qasey (Note: Kabardian: Къэсей Russian: Касай); Leuneche (Note: Kabardian: ЛэунэкIэ Russian: Лавнека); Batcheriy (Note: Kabardian: Батчэрый Russian: Бахтыгирей)
Names
- Hatokhshoqo, son of Misost
- Kabardian: Мысост и къуэ ХьэтIохъущокъуэ
- House: Inalid dynasty; House of Misost
- Father: Misost Qazy
- Religion: Sunni Islam

Hatokhshoqo Misost (Note: Kabardian: Мысост ХьэтIохъущокъуэ Russian: Атажукин (Хатокшоко) Мисостов) was a Kabardian prince of the Misost family who served as the Grand Prince of Kabardia from approximately 1709 or 1710 until 1721. He was the eldest son of the founder of the Misost princely house and emerged as one of the leading political figures in Kabardia during the early 18th century, particularly in relations with the Russian Tsardom and in conflicts against the Crimean Khanate and Ottoman-aligned forces.

== Biography ==
Hatokhshoqo Misost was the eldest son of the founder of the Misost dynasty; Misost Qaziy. His name first appears in sources in connection with his detention as a hostage in the city of Terek by Prince Kasbulat Musalovich Cherkassky in 1674. He later participated in the Kuban campaign of the princes of Greater Kabardia alongside Alexander Bekovich-Cherkassky in 1711. Sources remain largely silent regarding Hatokshoqo's activities between 1674 and 1711, a period marked by prolonged conflicts between the Kabardians and the Crimean khans, particularly Qaplan I Giray, in which he is believed to have taken part.

From 1712 onward, archival documents refer to him as the Grand Prince of Kabardia. He is considered to have been among the organizers of the Kabardian resistance against the Kuban Sultan Nuradin. In September 1712, the Kabardian princes informed Peter I of Russia of their victory over Nuradin. The charter listed the Kabardian rulers as Hatokhshoqo, Aslanbech Qeytuqo, Tatarkhan Bechmirza, and his brothers.

Another document, dated 5 December 1717 and signed by Hatokhshoqo Misost alongside other Kabardian princes in order of seniority —Hatokhshoqo, Yislambech Misost, Aslanbech Qeytuqo, Tatarkhan Bechmirza, and Bemat Kurghoqo— was addressed to Peter I, reaffirming their loyalty to Russia and requesting the return of runaway Kabardian peasants who had settled in Russian fortresses.

The same names appear in other diplomatic correspondence, as well as in a charter issued by Peter I of Russia to the Kabardian princes on 20 March 1718. In these documents, Khatakshuko's name consistently appears first, indicating his position as the senior ruler of Greater Kabarda at the time.

A letter dated September 1712 from the princes Hatokhshoqo, Aslanbech, and Tatarkhan with their brothers informed Peter I of the arrival of Alexander Bekovich-Cherkassky in Kabardia carrying the Tsar's charter, which called upon the Kabardians to enter Russian service and oppose the Ottoman Empire and the Crimean Khanate.

The correspondence also contained criticism of the Russian government for failing to provide military assistance during the Kabardians' conflict with the Crimean Tatars. The princes stated that envoys had previously been sent to Moscow with complaints regarding Crimean attacks on Kabardia, but alleged that the envoys had not been granted an audience with the Tsar and had instead been turned back.

The latter part of the letter reaffirmed the loyalty of the Kabardian rulers to the Russian state and referenced their campaign against the forces of Nuraddin Sultan, reportedly numbering fifteen thousand men, whom the Kabardians claimed to have defeated in battle.

On 20 March 1718, Hatokhshoqo Misost and the other Kabardian rulers received another charter from Peter I notifying them of the salary and gifts sent by the Tsar, as well as orders issued to Russian troops to assist Kabardia in the event of an external attack.

Additional sources and information about the life of Hatokhshoqo Misost are lacking, it is known he kept his position as the Grand Prince of Kabardia until 1721, his death. He was succeeded by Yislambech Misost.

== Sources ==
- Kardanov, Ch. E. (2016). Князья Кабарды [Princes of Kabarda] (in Russian). Nalchik: Izdatel'stvo M. i V. Kotlyarovykh. ISBN 978-5-93680-971-2.
