= Qasey of Kabardia =

Kabardian Grand Prince 1762 - 1773

Qasey Hatokhshoqo
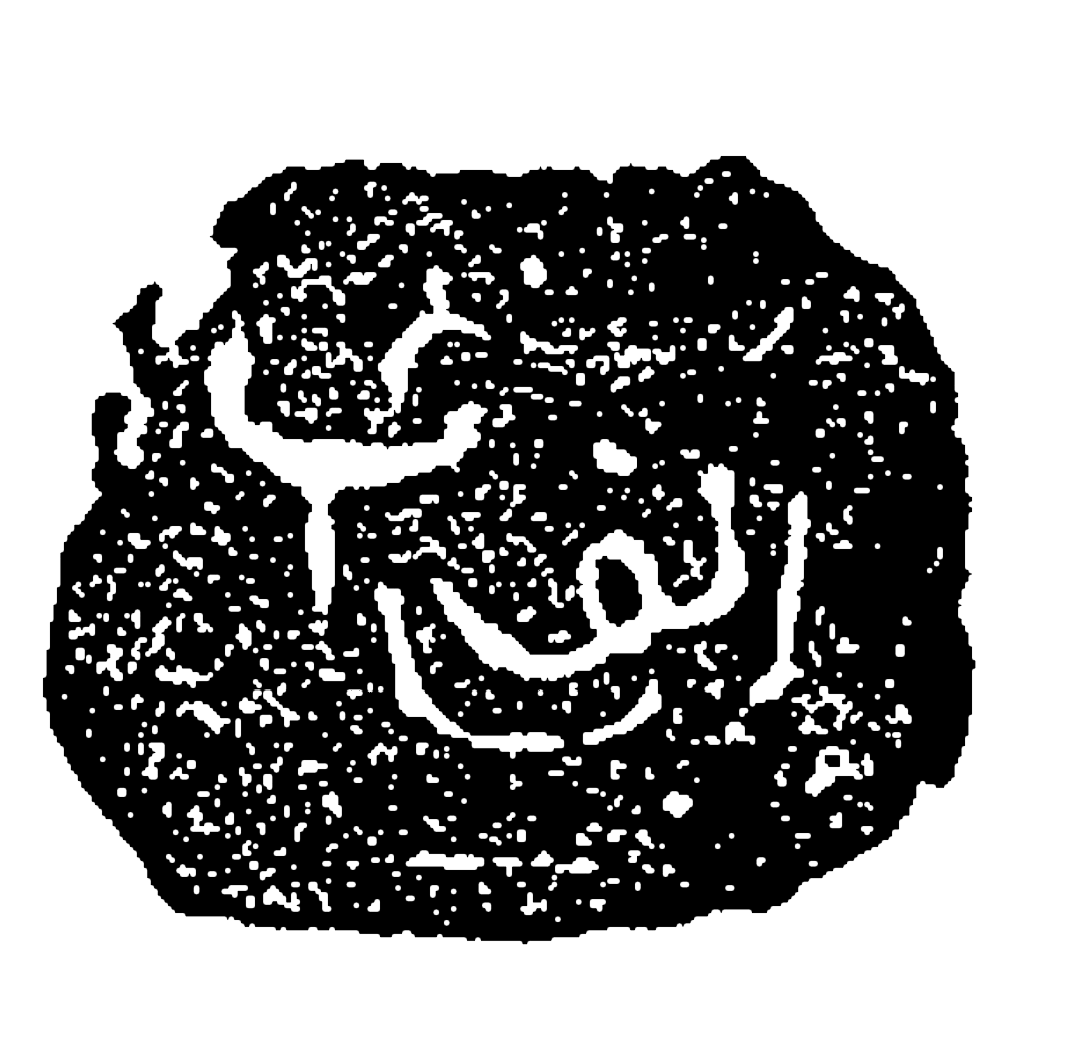
- 1719 seal of Qasey

Grand Prince of Kabardia
- Reign: 1762 – 1773
- Predecessor: Bemat Kurghoqo
- Successor: Jankhot Tatarkhan
- Born: Unknown; Kabardia
- Died: 1773; Kabardia
- Issue: Qushuq; Jeteghezh; Third son with unknown name
Names
- Qasey, son of Hatokhshoqo
- Kabardian: ХьэтIохъущокъуэ и къуэ Къэсей
- House: Inalid dynasty; House of Misost
- Father: Hatokhshoqo Misost
- Religion: Sunni Islam

Qasey Hatokhshoqo (Note: Kabardian: ХьэтIохъущокъуэ Къэсей) was a Kabardian prince who served as the Grand Prince of Kabardia from 1762 until his death in 1773. He is chiefly known for opposing Russian expansion into Circassia during the early stages of the Russo-Circassian War, particularly after the establishment of the Mozdok fortress in 1763.

== Early life ==
Qasey, son of Hatokhshoqo Misost, was one of the influential princes of Greater Kabardia. His mother was Khanum, the daughter of Saltamamut and sister of Alibek, ruler of Aksay. Saltamamut was the son of Alibek, the progenitor of the Aksay rulers.

Sources describe Qasey as strong-willed and hard in character, portraying him as a determined political actor rather than a passive victim.

In 1719, the Collegium of Foreign Affairs decided to dispatch Sultan Aliy's ambassador to Kabardia with valuable gifts and "salaries" for the Kabardian rulers. According to the records, "Kasai-bek" (Qasey) arrived at the Terek and reassured the Terek commandant of the Kabardians' loyalty to the Russian emperor. Sultan Aliy had been detained at the Terek because some Kabardian princes had entered into an agreement with Sultan Bakhti Giray. Following Qasey's petition, the ambassador was allowed to proceed to Kabardia. The governor of Astrakhan was also ordered to "render all possible assistance" to the Kabardians in the event of a Tatar attack.

In 1720, the Kabardian princes split into two factions, known as the Baksan and Kashkatau parties. The former was led by Bemat Kurghoqo, Qasey, and Yislambech Misost, while the latter was led by Aslanbech Qeytuqo, Tatarkhan Bechmirza, and their brothers. The Baksan faction, represented by Yislam, sided with the Crimean Khanate, while the Kashkatau faction remained loyal to Russia. These divisions would subsequently shape Qasey's political career.

Russian academician Peter Simon Pallas, who visited Kabardia, recorded information about Qasey in his genealogy of the Kabardian princes. Opposite Qasey's name, Pallas noted that "Kasai served under Peter the Great during his Persian campaign."

In 1725, the Baksan party surrendered to the Kashkatau party, which was supported by the Crimean Tatars under Bakhti Giray. Its leaders were forced to provide hostages to Bakhti Giray; Qasey was among those who gave hostages.

Qasey, a representative of the Baksan princely group, appears again in a document from early 1737. According to the document, Aslanbech, Bemat, Qasey, and others agreed to exile the Bechmirzas, the sons of Tatarkhan Bechmirza and Batoqo Bechmirza, to the Kumyks and Tatars. They divided the Bechmirzas' subjects among themselves, while simultaneously swearing allegiance to Russia and agreeing not to support the Crimeans.

On June 1, 1743, Bemat Kurghoqo and Qasey, on behalf of the Kabardian princes, petitioned the Russian authorities regarding Khan Dzhan, the daughter of Kurghoqo Hatokhshoqo and wife of the Kalmyk ruler Donduk-Ombo. They requested that, in recognition of their faithful service and their fulfillment of a decree requiring them to hand over two sons to Donduk-Ombo, Dzhan be forgiven for her alleged offenses and returned to her homeland with all her children. They further requested that Donduk-Ombo's uluses be granted to them and that Dzhan and her sons be placed under protection. Because Dzhan had not involved the Kabardian feudal lords in the struggle for power in Kalmykia, and because of her ancestors' services to Russia, the request was granted.

On December 15, 1743, Empress Elizabeth Petrovna signed a charter to the Kabardian feudal lords, including Qasey, ordering that 2,000 rubles in salary be sent to them from Astrakhan.

On December 19, another charter from Elizabeth was sent to Bemat, Qasey, and other princes concerning the dispatch of Brigadier P. Koltsov to Kabardia to restore peace.

The extent of Qasey's holdings is recorded on Stepan Chichagov's map of Kabardian lands. His estate was marked as number 10, while estates numbered 11 through 27 comprised more than sixteen additional holdings. His brother Muhamad possessed more than ten villages, including a central estate. Together, the two brothers controlled 28 villages and two households.

== Exile ==
A major turning point in Qasey's life came after Qanamat, son of Qeytuqo Jambot, was killed during the Kabardian civil war of 1720–1736.

At a Kabardian council, Bemat Kurghoqo swore on the Quran that Qasey's Uorqi (nobles or retainers) were responsible for Qanamat's death and named several individuals. The Qeytuqo princes subsequently attacked the families of those accused and killed almost all of them.

In 1744, the conflict among the Kabardian princes escalated into open violence. Around 200 horsemen belonging to the Qeytuqo princes, together with supporters of the Bechmirzas, attacked Qasey's village. They surrounded, burned, and plundered it. Qasey was shot and wounded, while his associate Tambiy Azamat was maimed. Qasey nevertheless survived; the Russian doctor Friedrich Rolsen later treated him, and he recovered.

However, Batoqo and many others believed that the actual perpetrators were three noble families associated with Bemat: the Qazans, Jantemirs, and Babugus. In an attempt to stop the bloodshed, Qasey accepted responsibility for the killing, thereby saving his own nobles from further retaliation.

An attempt at reconciliation between the Qeytuqos and the Bechmirzas in 1747 resulted in Qasey's expulsion from Kabardia for two years. During his absence, the Misostey appanage was left without its prince, and its population suffered considerably.

Qasey consequently went to Kizlyar, accompanied by members of his family and approximately 100 noble horsemen, including twelve individuals of princely descent among his relatives.

The feud continued, which concerned the Russian government. On September 29, 1747, Chancellor Bestuzhev-Ryumin wrote to Bamat Kurgokin urging an end to the unrest:

"... your brother Kasai Atazhukin (Qasey Hatokhshoqo), it is said in the letter, with his family, due to danger from you and from Kabarda, came to Kizlyar and asks for protection; and that you, Batok (Batoqo) and Dzhanbulat, (Jambolet) also ask him, the governor (Grand Prince of Kabardia), to release the hostages Aslanuka Arslanbekov (Aslanuqo Aslanbech), Kurgoku Tatarkhanov (Kurghoqo Tatarkhan) and Sholokh Kaisinov (Sholokh Qaisin) held by Greater Kabarda, all three, and in their place, accept one hostage from all of you, now living in Kabarda.

And I declare to you that Her Majesty, our most gracious sovereign, has most graciously praised your reconciliation with Batok and with Dzhanbulat-bek (Jambolet) and their brothers, but on the contrary, Her Majesty did not wish to hear about the quarrel that has arisen again between you and Kasai Atazhukin (Qasey Hatokhshoqo) and his brothers"

Bestuzhev-Ryumin further emphasized that when Kabardia was "in good condition," it could "not only repel its enemies" but also "subjugate" other mountain peoples. When the Kabardian rulers fell out among themselves and began waging civil war, however, they provided external enemies with a pretext for attacks. Regarding Qasey, Bestuzhev-Ryumin wrote:

"...in his sound judgment, Kasai, as the eldest and long-time benevolent to you, and needed by all of Kabarda," therefore, there is no point in exiling him. For now, according to the chancellor, Kasai and his people will be kept in Kizlyar, and hostages, according to the queen's decree, are to be "maintained only two people, namely: one from the Baksan party, and the other from the Kashkatov party."

In a letter dated November 10, 1749, Bestuzhev-Ryumin informed Bemat Kurghoqo and other princes that the reconciliation had finally taken place. Elizabeth Petrovna accepted the reconciliation "to her satisfaction" and ordered that 1,000 rubles in "salary" be sent to the "Kabardian owners." Nevertheless, the leaders of both parties "show no inclination" toward genuine peace. Among the Kabardian feudal nobility, the idea arose of exiling Bamat himself, who was considered responsible for the feud because his uzdeni had killed Qanamat. Qasey had taken the blame out of friendship and was consequently punished for it.

== Return ==
In November 1748, Russian envoys met Qasey and his brothers on the left bank of the Terek. Qasey explained that he had entered Kabardia under the protection of Jambolet, Yelbezdiqo, and the Tambiy and Kudenet noble families. He subsequently stayed among the Anzor people as their guest. A large Kabardian council was then summoned to consider his return.

By 1749, Qasey had effectively returned to Kabardian political life. Russian reports concerning his return reached Moscow, while Russian agents continued to monitor the situation.

== Reign ==
Qasey became the Grand Prince of Kabardia in 1762, succeeding Bemat Kurghoqo.

In 1764, the Lesser Kabardian Prince Kurghoqo Qanchoqo fled to Russia following an unsuccessful attempt by Qasey to assassinate him.

According to a report by Kizlyar commandant N. A. Potapov to the College of Foreign Affairs dated June 27, 1764, Qasey attempted to track down Kurghoqo. Kurghoqo was warned of the attempt and hid in the forest. The princes involved in the plot subsequently ravaged the lands of Jilakhstaney, stealing 12 horses and cattle and capturing four of the prince's subjects. According to the account, the planned murder of Kurghoqo was intended to prevent serfs from fleeing to Russian fortresses.

On October 31, 1764, Qasey sent a letter to Kizlyar concerning the baptism of Kabardian peasants there. In it, he stated: “Our Kabardian serfs, not wanting to live here in Kabarda, flee and accept baptism, and then, not wanting Christianity, flee again to us, to Kabarda.”

The Foundation of Mozdok, the continued flight of peasants from Kabardia, and the refusal of the Russian military authorities to comply repeatedly with the demands of the Kabardian owners to prevent the construction of fortifications and return escaped serfs all provoked indignation among the Kabardian feudal nobility.

In the spring of 1767, the Collegium of Foreign Affairs sent a decree to Potapov in response to his reports of April 3, 19, 25, and 30. The decree referred to a report made by Captain Alexander Kireev of Greater Kabardia on March 23, according to which Qasey had convened a meeting of princes and uzdens on March 12. Princes Qaziy Qeysin and Hamirza Qeytuqo, together with Misost the Great, had "communicated with their uzdens" and demanded that the Russian side withdraw and that they come under Crimean protection.

Qasey, his brothers, and their uzdens had agreed that they would not seek any protection other than that of Russia. On the sixth day of the prolonged meeting, apparently not without Qasey's influence, "all the owners and uzdens of both parties nevertheless agreed with the owner Qasey, that they would all be united and obedient to their eldest owner, Qasey, in everything."

Qasey personally and "secretly" told Captain Kireev that he himself "will break his previous oath, and even now he does not wish to leave Russia."

At the same time, it was decided to establish three posts "to prevent escapes": at the Beshtamak tract, on the Malka River, and at the Dzhulat tract, "on the other side of Kara-Terk."

Hamirza Qeytuqo nevertheless intended to leave for Crimea "with his brothers and subjects." He therefore asked Qasey's permission to do so, fearing "that there might be some kind of attack on him from the Russian side" because he had secretly taken his son from Russian custody from the fortress and had been responsible for the incident.

According to the document, Hamirza, while at Qasey's kosha, voiced his objections during the meeting. The owners of both parties, who had gathered twenty miles from their homes, subsequently held a prolonged and difficult council from April 11 to 21. They eventually reached a unanimous decision "to undertake no secret deeds for their own benefit, or with rebellion, or any other matter" without a common decision, and to "be obedient to the senior owner of Kasai, Atazhukin." A letter recording the decision was given to Kireev, together with "ink seals," apparently impressions made with inked fingerprints. The letter likewise requested that the Russian authorities not accept fugitives in Mozdok, "not to admit them until baptism, and to return them."

The Russian military administration in the Caucasus devoted considerable attention to the Kabardian question during the Russo–Turkish War (1768–1774). In October 1770, Captain Gastotti wrote to the College of Foreign Affairs: "...much effort had to be expended to ensure that the people inhabiting Great Kabarda upheld the oath of allegiance inflicted upon them last year. The imagination of certain grievances about which he complains, but especially the money sent to him by the Turks, has shaken him..."

Gastotti was referring to a section of the Kabardian rulers, primarily representatives of the Baksan party, and advocated continuing the policy of fomenting internal divisions between the clans.

In 1773, Jankhot was elected as the new Grand Prince of Kabardia following Qasey's death.

== Ancestry ==
Ancestors of Qasey of Kabardia

8. Qaziy Pshiapshoqo
4. Misost Qazy
2. Hatokhshoqo Misost
1. Qasey Hatokhshoqo
12. Alibek
6. Saltamamut
3. Khanum

== Bibliography ==
- Kardanov, Ch. E. (2016). Князья Кабарды [Princes of Kabarda] (in Russian). Nalchik: Izdatel'stvo M. i V. Kotlyarovykh. ISBN 978-5-93680-971-2.
