= Adildjeriy Hatokhshoqo =

Adildjeriy Temruqo Hatokhshoqo (died 1807), was a Circassian noble from Kabardia of the Hatokhshoqo dynasty. He held the Russian rank of Premier Major in 1794. He was a member of the anti-colonial sociopolitical events took place in Kabardia in the late 18th century. He was the son of Temruqo Hadji Bematuqo and the grandson of Bemat Kurghoqo of Kabardia

== Biography ==
His brother, Ismail Bey Hatokhshoqo, was the prototype of the hero of the Mikhail Lermontov's poem "Ismail Bey". In 1787, as part of the Kabardian national militia, he took part in the Russo-Turkish War of 1787–1792 in Kuban. Adildjeriy became one of the leaders of the resistance to the introduction of the Kabardian tribal courts and executions, acting on the basis of Russian law, in conjunction with other actions violating the rights of Kabardian peoples.

In 1795, he and his brother Ismail Bey and the prince Hatokhshoqo Hamirza were expelled from Kabardia in Ekaterinoslav province. In 1798, he fled from exile back to Kabardia and headed the anti-colonial movement giving it a religious content. In 1799, an active policy of Hatokhshoqo allowed to abolish courts and tribal violence in Kabardia.

He made a pilgrimage to Mecca, He also studied Arabic and Tatar "literacy". He was married and had five sons: Qasey, Ismael, Qaziy, Mohammed, and Ziwuskhan. He died in 1807 during an epidemic of plague.
