= Qeytuqo Jambot =

- Qeytuqo the Golden

Prince of Qeytuqey
- Reign: fl. 1670s – 1690s
- Predecessor: Office established
- Successor: Aslanbech Qeytuqo
- Born: 17th century Kabardia
- Died: Unknown; Kabardia
- Issue: Sons: Aslanbech; Jambolet; Qanamat; Daughters: Unnamed daughter
Names
- Qeytuqo, son of Jambot
- Kabardian: Къетыкъуэ и къуэ Жамбот
- House: Inalid dynasty; House of Jambot; House of Qeytuqo (founder)
- Father: Jambot Qaziy

Qeytuqo Jambot (Kabardian: Къетыкъуэ Жамбот) also known as Qeytuqo the Golden (Kabardian: Къетыкъуэ Дыщэ), was a Kabardian prince of the Qeytuqo dynasty. He was the son of Jambot Qaziy, who divided his inheritance between Qeytuqo and his brother Bechmirza following a dispute between them. Qeytuqo subsequently held lands in the areas of present-day Argudan, Stary Cherek, Aushiger, Kakhun, Zhemtaly, and Nizhny Cherek.

== Biography ==
=== In oral tradition ===
Qeytuqo Jambot is the subject of numerous oral traditions preserved among residents of villages in Kabardia that were formerly associated with the possessions of the Qeytuqo dynasty. According to Amirkhan Khavpachev, Mad and Khaziz Berbekov, Ambi Shkhagapsoev, Chamal Gutov, and other collectors and keepers of Kabardian oral traditions, Qeytuqo was regarded as an authority on Kabardian customary law, customs, and traditions, and was sometimes characterized as a legislator.

One tradition associates Qeytuqo's name with a custom concerning late arrivals at feasts. According to the story, during a feast attended by princes and warriors, an uninvited uzden arrived after the proceedings had begun. Qeytuqo, who was serving as toastmaster, ordered that a cup of wine be poured for the newcomer. After the noble drank it, Qeytuqo ordered a second and then a third cup. The story is traditionally cited as the origin of a custom in several Kabardian villages whereby a latecomer was required to drink three cups upon arrival.

The attribution of this custom is disputed in oral tradition. Villages formerly associated with the Misostey family—including Nauruzovo (Islamovo), Tambiyevo (Dugulubgey), Tambiyevo II (Altud), Inalovo (Karagach), Kuchmazukino (Old Fortress), Kasayevo (Baksanenok), and Tyzhevo (Kishpek)—attribute its origin differently. Another version attributes the custom to Misost Qaziy rather than Qeytuqo. In this account, Misost drank three cups on behalf of his elder brothers, Hatokhshoqo and Jambot, who had refused them, and the practice of allowing the toastmaster to make three consecutive toasts supposedly originated from this event.

The historical authenticity of these traditions cannot be established with certainty. Since few documentary sources concerning Qeytuqo Jambot have survived, oral accounts provide important evidence concerning his later reputation but cannot by themselves establish the precise circumstances or origins of the customs attributed to him.

=== Domains ===
Qeytuqo and his brother Bechmirza Jambot were reportedly in conflict during the lifetime of their father, Jambot. Jambot subsequently allocated separate lands to his sons. Qeytuqo received territories corresponding to parts of present-day Argudan, Stary Cherek (Dokshokovo), Aushiger (Doguzhokovo), Kakhun (Dokshukino), Zhemtaly (Verkhneye Kozhokovo), and Nizhny Cherek (Nizhneye Kozhokovo).

According to indirect evidence cited by E. J. Naloeva, Qeytuqo's father, Jambot, provided refuge in the late 17th century to Besleney residents fleeing the rule of the Crimean Khan. The refugees were reportedly settled on his lands, including the Makhukovo and Dokhchuevo taverns, and were supplied with seeds and agricultural implements. At the time, Makhukovo was reportedly held by Jambot's third son, Jambolet.

=== inheritance ===
Approximately half a century later, the authorities of Crimean Khanate appealed to Empress Elizabeth Petrovna for the return of the fugitives who had taken refuge in Kabardia, reportedly on the grounds that otherwise they would be "cut down with sabres". In response to this episode, Jambolet, a son of Qeytuqo and grandson of Jambot, stated that his grandfather had supported the Besleney refugees with his own provisions, arranged marriages for them, and supplied them with the necessities required for maintaining their households. This testimony has been regarded as possible evidence for the presence of the father of Akhmetkhan and Jabagh Qazanoqo in these territories during the period when the inheritance of Qeytuqo was held by the grand prince.

The historian Shora Nogmov also mentions a dispute between Qeytuqo and Bechmirza concerning their inheritance. According to Nogmov, the brothers broke their "vow of brotherly love" over the division of their father's possessions, prompting Zhambot to divide the inheritance between them.

Qeytuqo had three sons: Aslanbech, Qanamat, and Jambolet.

Because of the limited surviving documentary evidence, relatively little is known about Qeytuqo Jambot's life and activities. Much of the available information concerning him derives from genealogical records, later historical accounts, and oral traditions, making it difficult to reconstruct a detailed biography.
