= Kurghoqo of Kabardia =

Supreme Prince of Kabardia

Kurghoqo Hatokhshoqo
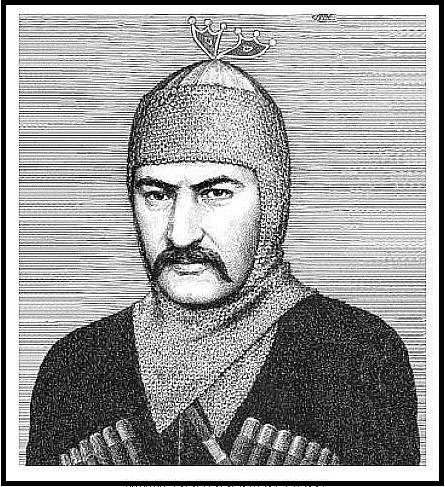

Grand Prince of Kabardia
- Reign: 1695 – 1709/1710
- Predecessor: Misost Qazy
- Successor: Hatokhshoqo Misost
- Born: 17th century Kabardia
- Died: 1709 or 1710; Kabardia
- Issue: Sons: Bemat Kurghoqo; Daughters: Jan Kurghoqo; "Vera Dondukovna" after baptized; Married to the Kalmyk khan Donduk-Ombo
Names
- Kurghoqo, son of Hatokhshoqo
- Kabardian: ХьэтIохъущокъуэ и къуэ Кургъокъуэ
- House: Inalid dynasty; House of Hatokhshoqo
- Father: Hatokhshoqo Qazy
- Religion: Sunni Islam
- Military career
- Conflicts: Crimean–Circassian wars; Battle of Kanzhal

Kurghoqo Hatokhshoqo (Note: Kabardian: Кургъуокъуэ ХьэтIохъущокъуэ Russian: Кургоко Атажукин (Хатокшоко)) was the Grand Prince of Kabardia from 1695 until his death. He came to power following the death of his uncle, Misost I, and ruled during a period of frequent conflicts involving Kabardia, the Crimean Khanate, and the Ottoman sphere of influence in the North Caucasus.

== Biography ==
=== Rise to power ===
After the death of his uncle Misost, he was elected grand prince of Kabardia. He fought a long struggle with the Crimean Khanate.

=== Struggle against Crimean raids ===
Banner of Hatokhshoqo princes.

In 1699, the Crimean detachment under the command of Kalga Shahbaz Giray invaded Circassia. In December of the same year, Kalga Shahbaz-Giray was killed in Besleney, in the home of the Kabardian prince Timur-Bulat. In 1700–1701, the Crimean detachments led by Kaplan Giray I attacked Circassia and Kabardia twice. In 1703, the army of the Crimeans and their allies under the leadership of Kalga Gazi Giray occupied Kabardia. Tatars and Nogais engaged in robbery and extortion against Circassians. A general uprising broke out in Kabardia. In 1707, the Crimean Tatars launched a new raid on Kabardia. The Tatars took thousands of cattle, but were defeated by the Kabardians.

During the reign of Kurghoqo Hatokhshoqo, the famous Battle of Kanzhal (1708) took place, in which the Kabardians defeated a large Tatar-Turkish army led by Qaplan I Giray. This event was of great importance in the history of Circassia and the entire history of the North Caucasus. Many episodes of the Kanzhal battle have been preserved in Adyghe folklore in the form of legends and historical-epic songs in which Kurghoqo Hatokhshoqo is the main character. The Kabardians under his command defended their homeland and preserved their political independence. The war increased Kabardian authority in the Caucasus.

In 1710, the Crimean Tatars and Nogais launched a new raid on Circassia and Kabardia, capturing large numbers of cattle and horses.

=== Death ===
Grand Prince Kurghoqo Hatokhshoqo died in 1709/1710.
