= Batoqo of Kabardia =

Batoqo Bechmirza
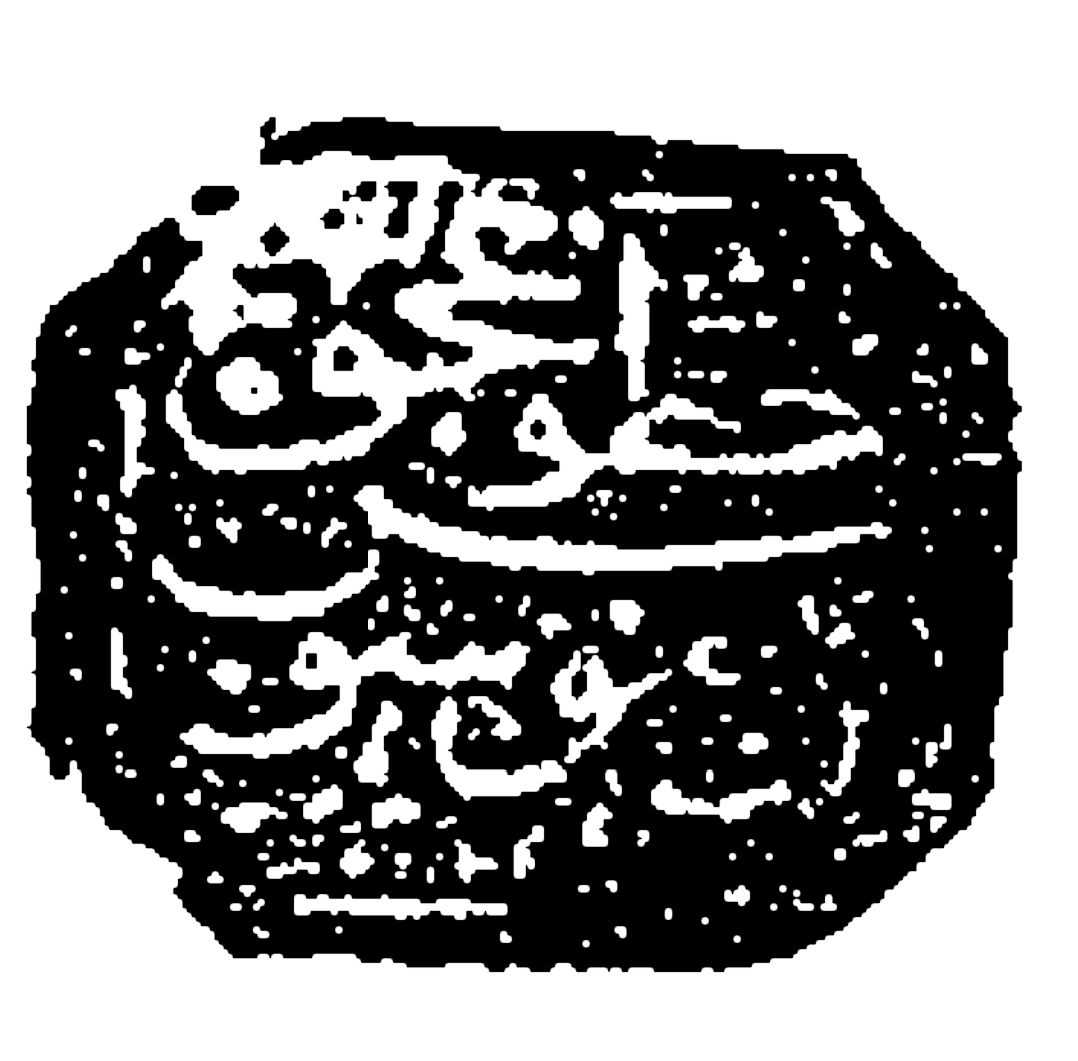
- 1719 seal of Batoqo

Grand Prince of Kabardia
- Reign: 1746 – 1752
- Predecessor: Aslanbech Qeytuqo
- Successor: Bamat Kurghoqo
- Born: 1692; Kabardia
- Died: 1752; Kuban
- Issue: Sons: Tsiqa (born 1736); Muhammad (born 1738)
Names
- Batoqo, son of Bechmirza
- Kabardian: Бэчмырзэ и къуэ Бэтокъуэ
- House: Inalid dynasty; House of Bechmirza
- Father: Bechmirza Jambot
- Religion: Sunni Islam

Batoqo Bechmirza (Note: Kabardian: Бэчмырзэ Бэтокъуэ) was a Kabardian prince of the Bechmirza family who served as the Grand Prince of Kabardia from 1746 to 1752. Active during the early and mid-18th century, he participated in the major political and military affairs of Kabardia, including relations with the Russian Empire, conflicts involving the Crimean Khanate, and internal struggles among the Kabardian princely houses. He was among the Kabardian nobles who appealed to Peter the Great for military assistance against Crimean and Nogai incursions, and later emerged as one of the leading princes of Greater Kabardia before dying in Kuban in 1752.

== Biography ==
Batoqo Bechmirza, the fourth son of Bechmirza Jambot, is documented among the Kabardian princes active in the early 18th century. He was one of the signatories of a letter dated 17 January 1719 addressed to Peter the Great, in which the Kabardian rulers warned of an impending attack by Kuban, Nogai, and Crimean forces and requested Russian military protection.

Available evidence suggests that Batoqo participated, alongside his brothers, in the 1711 Trans-Kuban campaign under the command of Alexander Bekovich-Cherkassky, during which the forces of Nuradin-Sultan were defeated. His continued presence in sources relating to the 1720s indicates his involvement in the major political and military developments in Greater Kabardia alongside the Bechmirza and Qeytuqo families.

According to V. N. Sokurov, Batoqo's atalyk (educator) was Ali Shipshev. Sokurov also notes that Batoqo was approximately 19 years old in 1711, suggesting a birth date around 1692.

On 3 December 1720, Batoqo, together with several Kabardian princes, sent an envoy to the Russian Collegium of Foreign Affairs reporting the invasion of the Crimean Khan and requesting the construction of a fortress for defensive purposes. On 20 April 1721, he addressed State Chancellor Gavriil Golovkin and Vice-Chancellor Pyotr Shafirov, appealing for military assistance against the khan's forces and emphasizing Kabardia's longstanding alignment with Russia.

In January second 1723, Tsar Peter I issued a charter to members of the Qeytuqo and Bechmirza princely families regarding the payment of stipends to Aslanbech Qeytuqo, Tatarkhan Bechmirza, Batoqo, and Qeysin, expressing hope that they would continue to serve Russian interests loyally. Despite these growing relations with Russia, the North Caucasus remained consumed by internal conflict and factional rivalry throughout the following decades.

Batoko Bekmurzin later emerged as one of the leading princes of Kabardia and served as the Grand Prince of Kabardia from 1746 to 1752. Accounts portrayed him as a comparatively weak ruler, unable to suppress the continuing feuds among the Kabardian princely houses.

According to sources dated June 28, 1747, Batoqo had two sons: Tsiqa, aged eleven, and Muhammad, aged nine. His principal residence was located in the tract of Lakhuageps, in the region of Kyzburun and the Baksan area.

In 1748, during Batoqo's rule, representatives of the Hatokhshoqo, Bechmirza, and Misost princely families united with the support of the uzden clans of the Anzoreys, Kudeneteys, and Tambiys, agreeing to restore the exiled prince Qasey and his brothers to Kabardia. The episode reflected the continuing instability and factionalism within the principality.

Political tensions worsened further in 1749. On November 24 of that year, the Kizlyar nobleman A. Kireev reported to Lieutenant General A. P. Devits that Batoqo Bechmirza had been expelled from Kabardia. Kireev also informed him of the arrival of envoys from the Crimean Khan demanding captives from the Kabardians, as well as reports of a pestilence beyond the Kuban River. According to the same report, Batoqo had taken refuge beyond the Kuban with Sopelen-Sultan, having accepted the latter's son into fosterage, though Kireev stated that Batoqo "would not go over to the Crimean side."

Batoqo Bechmirza later died in Kuban in 1752. The Bechmirza family split into two branches: the Misostovs and the Ajgeriyevs (Ajcery). Following the Circassian exile, a branch of the Ajgeriyevs settled in Sarıgüney village in the Akdağmadeni district of Yozgat Province, Turkey.

== Sources ==
- Kardanov, Ch. E. (2016). Князья Кабарды [Princes of Kabarda] (in Russian). Nalchik: Izdatel'stvo M. i V. Kotlyarovykh. ISBN 978-5-93680-971-2.
