= Kasbulat the Brave =

Kasbulat Cherkassky
- Касбулат (Каспулат) Муцалович Черкасский
- Born: Unknown; Kabardia, North Caucasus
- Died: 1681
- Relatives: Mutsal Cherkassky (father); Kantemir Cherkassky (brother)
- Military career
- Allegiance: Tsardom of Russia
- Rank: Pshi (Prince); (Tsardom of Russia) Military commander
- Conflicts: Russo-Persian War (1651-1653); Battle of Sunzha (1651); Don campaign (1662); Razin's rebellion (1671); Campaign against the Nogais (1672); Azov campaign (1674); Kabardian Civil War (1674–1675); Crimean campaign (1675); Russo-Turkish War (1672–1681); Chyhyryn campaign (1678); Zaporozhye campaign (1679)

Kasbulat Mutsalovich Cherkassky (Russian: Касбулат Муцалович Черкасский, Kabardian: Муцал и къуэ Къасболэт "Mutsal yiqo Kasbulat"), also known as Kasbulat the Brave was a Kabardian prince in the service of the Tsardom of Russia during the 17th century. He led Russian, Kabardian, Kalmyk, and Cossack forces in multiple campaigns against the Crimean Khanate, the Nogai Horde, and the Ottoman Empire.

== Early life and family ==
Kasbulat Cherkassky was the son of Prince Mutsal Sunchaleyevich Cherkassky. He belonged to the Kabardian princely family that entered Russian service in the 16th century. In April 1648, Kasbulat together with his father arrived in Moscow, where they were received by Tsar Alexis Mikhailovich.

In 1651, Kasbulat together with his younger brother Kantemir participated in the defense of the Sunzhensky stockade against Dagestani forces, under the command of his father Mutsal Cherkassky.

== Biography ==
In 1661, after his father's death, Tsar Alexis Mikhailovich granted Kasbulat a charter (zhalovannaya gramota) giving him authority over the non-Russian population of the Terek fortress, including the Okochans and Circassians.

In 1662, Prince Kasbulat Cherkassky led his regiment from the Terek fortress to help the Don Cossacks who were fighting against the Crimean Tatars and Nogais.

In 1671, during Stepan Razin's rebellion, Kasbulat Cherkassky and his men defended the Artillery Tower of the Astrakhan Kremlin against the rebels. According to the Russian Biographical Dictionary, Cherkassky helped capture Astrakhan from the rebels and seized the rebel leader, Ataman Fyodor Sheludyak.

In 1672, the Kalmyk taisha Ayuka destroyed the Lesser Nogai Horde (Kaziyev ulus). In response, Nogai murzas killed Kasbulat's younger brother Kantemir. Kasbulat then called on Ayuka's Kalmyks and, together with the Terek Cossacks, devastated the lands of his enemies. In 1672–1673, Kasbulat Cherkassky, in alliance with the Kalmyks, also crushed the uluses of the Nogai murza Karakasay.

In the summer of 1674, Prince Kasbulat Cherkassky led a campaign against the Crimean uluses and the Turkish fortress of Azov. On September 1, 1674, his forces defeated a 1,500-strong Turkish–Crimean detachment, capturing many horses and livestock.

In the autumn of 1674, the Grand prince of Greater Kabardia, Misost Qazy, switched his allegiance to the Crimean Khan. Kasbulat pursued the rebels and forced them to return. Misost was compelled to swear allegiance to the Russian tsar.

In 1675, Prince Kasbulat Cherkassky commanded a Russian detachment of about 750 men in a campaign against the Crimean Khanate. His force included 200 Astrakhan streltsy, 300 Astrakhan Tatars, 96 Kabardian uzdens, 190 Okochans, 100 Grebensky Cossacks, and about 100 Kalmyks under Mazan-batyr. He joined forces with Zaporozhian ataman Ivan Sirko. Together, they crossed the Sivash, broke through Perekop, defeated the Crimean Tatars, and freed many Russian prisoners.

In 1677–1678, Kasbulat Cherkassky brought Kalmyks to help the Russian army at Chigirin. According to the diary of General Patrick Gordon, Kasbulat's contingent fought bravely. According to the Russian Biographical Dictionary, Kasbulat "came to the aid of voivode Prince Romodanovsky and bravely fought with his fellow believers." In 1679, Kasbulat Cherkassky was ordered to move to Zaporozhye and take positions near Chuguev and Kharkov. On August 5, 1679, his forces defeated a large Turkish–Crimean army on the banks of the Berekleika River, capturing many prisoners.

Kasbulat Cherkassky also carried out diplomatic missions for the Russian tsar. He participated in negotiations that led to a 20-year peace treaty between Russia and the Crimean Khanate.

Kasbulat Cherkassky died in 1681.

== Legacy ==
According to the Russian Biographical Dictionary, Kasbulat Cherkassky was "one of the small Caucasian rulers subject to Russia, distinguished by his zealous service to the Moscow sovereigns." An old Don Cossack song about "Kaspulat the brave" has been preserved. A tsar's charter to Cherkassky stated: "Your service and diligence with us, the Great Sovereign... will never be forgotten."

== See also ==
- Crimean–Circassian wars
- Kabardians
- Kalmyk Khanate
