= Bemat of Kabardia =

Supreme Prince of Kabardia

Bemat Kurghoqo
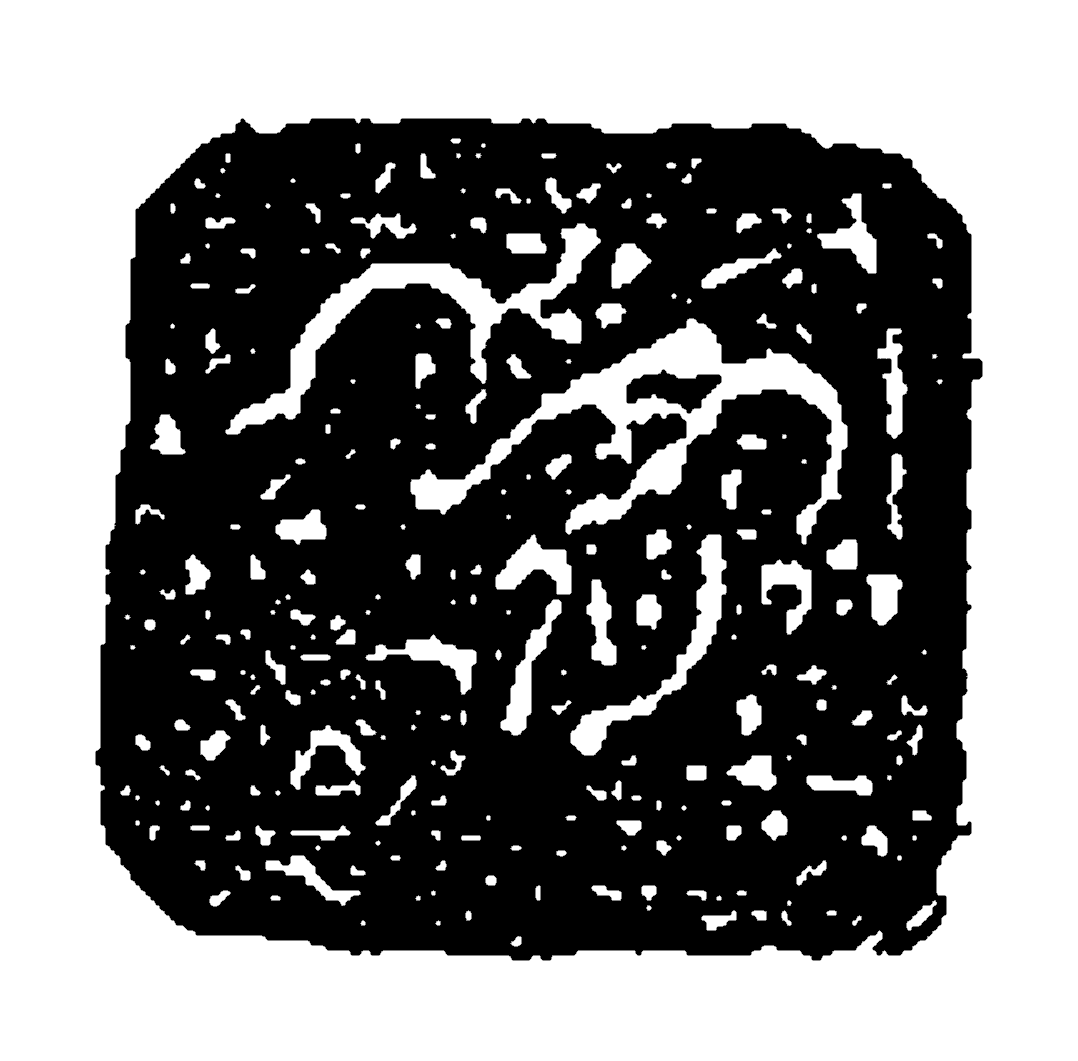
- 1719 seal of Bemat

Grand Prince of Kabardia
- Reign: 1753–1765
- Predecessor: Batoqo Bechmirza
- Successor: Qasey Hatokhshoqo
- Born: Unknown; Kabardia
- Died: 1765; Kabardia
- Issue: Sons: Temruqo Hadji; Dudaruqo; Sidaq; Misost; Hatokhshoqo; Daughters: Khaniy; Grandson: Adildjeriy (son of Temruqo hadji)
Names
- Bemat, son of Kurghoqo
- Kabardian: Кургъокъуэ и къуэ Бэмат
- House: Inalid dynasty; House of Hatokhshoqo
- Father: Kurghoqo of Kabardia

Bemat Kurghoqo (Note: Kabardian: Кургъокъуэ Бэмат) was a Kabardian prince and grand prince of Kabardia from 1753 until his death. A leading figure of the Baksan political faction, he played a central role in the prolonged internecine struggles among the Kabardian princely elite during the first half of the 18th century. Bemat maintained close relations with the Russian Empire while simultaneously navigating alliances and conflicts involving the Crimean Khanate and the Ottoman Empire. His tenure was marked by ongoing rivalry with the Kashkatau faction, disputes over territorial control, and repeated interventions by external powers in Kabardian affairs.

== Early life ==
Qazy's Kabardia was divided into Hatokhshoqey, Jambotey, and Misostey. Then, during a further division, the Jambot estates were replaced by the Qeytuqo and Bechmirza estates. Speaking about Bemat, he belonged to the Baksan party, was married to the sister of Aslanbech Qeytuqo, and owned two large estates and two dozen villages. On March 20, 1718, the princes of Greater Kabardia—Hatokhshoqo, Yislambech Misost, Aslanbech Qeytuqo, Tatarkhan the Golden, Bemat Kurghoqo, and others—appealed to Peter the Great with a request for a salary, protection from external enemies, and the return of runaway peasants. The tsar's reply stated that the princes' requests had been satisfied on all points of their appeal. In the early 1720s, the rulers of Greater Kabardia split into two factions: the Baksan and the Kashkatau. The former was led by Bemat and Yislambech, the latter by Aslanbech. Both parties frequently shifted their foreign policy allegiances, relying in internecine clashes sometimes on Russian forces and at other times on the support of the Crimean Khanate and the Ottoman Empire. The dismemberment of Greater Kabardia resulted from a power struggle among the senior princes and, naturally, did not bring peace and stability to the Kabardian lands. On one side, the Hatokhshoqo and Misost families, along with their children and nephews (the Baksan party), claimed supremacy; on the other, the Qeytuqo and Bechmirza families (the Kashkatau party).

Yet both princely factions remained formally loyal to the Russian state. On May 11, 1722, Aslanbech asked Peter the Great for military assistance to protect him from Bemat and Niyatshkha Kurghoqo, who, along with Crimean Tatars, intended to abduct him. Peter did not refuse outright, but gave the Astrakhan governor, A. P. Volynsky, a secret order: promise assistance and leave it at that. Aslanbech retreated to the Cherek Gorge and then, with his younger brother Jambolet and his son Hamirza Qeytuqo, crossed the Kuban to the Tatar camp. Even then, however, he did not oppose Russia or harm its interests, continuing instead his feud with his Kabardian rivals—Yislambech Misost, Bemat Kurghoqo, and Qasey Hatokhshoqo. In short, internecine conflicts that weakened and devastated Kabardia continued into the 18th century. In 1721, Bemat's uzdens, on his orders, killed Aslanbek Kaitukin's brother, Kanamet. In May 1729, the Crimean Kalga Bakhti Giray and his brother Murad Giray attacked Kabardia but were killed by Yislambech. In the spring of 1738, Princes Bemat and Karamirza Aliy wrote to the Don Ataman Danila Efremov about their campaign against Kuban and the conquest of the "Abaza Circassian" lands. They also took two hostages from the son of the Nogai murza Navruzov and escorted them to the Kizlyar Fortress. In her letter of July 1, 1738, Empress Anna Ioannovna expressed her satisfaction and gratitude to Prince Bemat for his active participation in the Kuban campaign and for bringing the Abazins under Kabardian control. The letter states:

And we, the great sovereign, our imperial majesty, accept this service and graciously hope that you, in accordance with your due loyalty to us, will continue to conduct searches for the Tatars remaining in the Kuban and bring them to utter ruin. You will not leave us, for which you will not be left without a reward in our imperial favor. As for the Abazins, about whom you wrote to us, the great empress, in your letter in 1732, and your Mukhamet-bek, who was here at our court, verbally represented that the Abazins had been in your possession since ancient times and until recently the Crimean and Kuban Tatars took them from you to Kuban.

At the end of the letter, the empress ordered that those Abazins be kept under close supervision so that they would not commit hostile acts or escape to the Kuban as before, nor be taken away again by the Tatars. In 1739, the son of Bemat, who had been held hostage in Kizlyar, was exchanged for the son of Qasey Hatokhshoqo. However, both princely factions—the Baksan and Kashkatau groups—continued to exist. On December 15, 1743, Empress Elizabeth Petrovna sent a salary of 2,000 rubles to Princes Bemat, Qasey, Karamirza, and others. In the summer of 1744, Brigadier Koltsov was ordered by Moscow to reconcile the warring parties, but he failed to do so. Chancellor Count A. P. Bestuzhev-Ryumin sent a letter to the Kashkatau party, complaining that the princes had not accepted Brigadier Koltsov's demands for reconciliation with the Baksan faction and strongly advised them to make peace "virtuously," which would be "more beneficial" for Kabardia.

For all questions related to internal relations in Kabardia, Bestuzhev advised contacting the Astrakhan governor, chamberlain and cavalier I. O. Brylkin. By the decree of the College of Foreign Affairs of July 18, 1746, the Astrakhan governor was charged with investigating the possibility of resettling the Kashkatau party and their people to the area of the Shalushka and Nalchik rivers. However, Aslanbech, as is clear from the document, declined the proposed settlement and requested permission to reside in Baksan or Chegem, which was opposed by representatives of the Baksan party, and consequently by Bemat, who repeatedly appealed to the Russian authorities with a request "not to allow" Aslanbech and his group to settle in Baksan. The decree of Empress Elizabeth Petrovna of April 15, 1747 to the Astrakhan governor I. O. Brylkin concerned complaints from the Ottomans that the Kabardians not only accepted fugitives from Kuban, including Circassians, Nogais, Abazins, and others, but also incited others to do so, and carried some off by force, conducting sudden raids on Kuban that brought destruction to the populations subject to the khan there. The decree does not contain any condemnation of the representatives of either faction or their actions, and instead instructs the governor to determine whether Crimea and the Ottomans had gone beyond normal diplomatic measures, whether the Crimean khan or the Kuban serasker had sent emissaries to Kabardia, and what responses they had received. In presenting the developments of the struggle between the two princely factions, one of its key figures was Bemat Kurghoqo, the ruler of the Baksan party. Extracting a coherent biography of any Kabardian prince from the available sources is often difficult, as it requires following the broader sequence of events connected to that individual. On June 28, 1747, A. P. Devits, commander of the troops in Kizlyar, reported to the College of Foreign Affairs on the presence of Captain Barkovsky in Kabardia with an escort to investigate Crimean complaints against the Kabardians. His report relied on the captain's account. On June 13, representatives of the Baksan and Kashkatau factions gathered in the Kyzburun region, where they assembled in formation. Barkovsky, Tatarov, Meshcheryakov, and other envoys from Devits also arrived. Batoqo and Bemat were the first to appear at the khasa, declaring that they were not subjects of the Ottomans but had long been subjects of Russia, and promising to adhere to this position, while rejecting Crimean claims. They also asserted that the Abaza had long been subjects of the Kabardian princes, not of the Kuban serasker.

On June 15, Barkovsky demanded a response from Prince Bemat regarding the complaint of the Crimean khan, specifically asking why the murzas Mantsir and Yusup were residing in his domain. Bemat replied that Mantsir had entered his domain through marriage after being driven out by the khan, who had confiscated his property and sought his death, while Yusup had come in search of horses stolen from him. On June 19, Prince Bemat presented letters to Governor I. O. Brylkin, one responding to the khan's complaint and another explaining the reasons for his dispute with Misost. On June 20, the captain visited Batoko, where all the princes had gathered, and requested a verbal report on the plans of the Turks and Tatars. On September 29, 1747, Chancellor A. P. Bestuzhev-Ryumin wrote to Bemat urging him to end his conflict with Kasai Atazhukin. Based on reports from Governor Brylkin and aware of Bemat's reconciliation with Batoko Bekmurzin and Zhambolat Kaitukin, the chancellor nevertheless expressed concern about the continuing feud with Kasai, who had taken refuge in Kizlyar. The remainder of the letter emphasized the need for unity among the Kabardian princes, warning that continued internal strife would further weaken Kabardia. According to the "Description of the Kabardian People" (May 1748), the forces of the Kabardian rulers were divided even within the Baksan faction.

on one side were Bemat Kurgokin and Zhambolat Kaytukin "with their children," on the other, Batoko with his and Aslanbek Kaytukin's "children." The quarrel between them arose because Bemat and Zhambolat, separately from the other rulers, wrote to the Crimean Khan that if Russia "attacked them" or Kasai returned to Kabardia, they hoped for support from Crimea, which "would defend them from the Russians and, upon their exit from Kabardia, order them to settle." However, the Khan did not promise military assistance.

The same source provides details on the military strength of Greater Kabardia: about twenty rulers, including Bemat and Aslanbech, could field more than 6,000 men. In Kizlyar, Qasey Hatokhshoqo, Karamirza Aliy, and Aliy Yislam with their brothers—twelve rulers and about 100 uzdens—remained in exile. Lesser Kabardia could muster just over 3,000 men. Regarding armament, the Kabardians possessed firearms, though most warriors carried sabres and other melee weapons, with armor also being common. The source characterizes the princes, including Bemat and Kasai Atazhukin, as courageous leaders and emphasizes the effectiveness of Kabardian forces.

On November 10, 1749, Chancellor A. P. Bestuzhev-Ryumin sent a letter to the princes Bemat Kurghoqo, Zhambolat Kaitukin, Qaramurza Aliyev, and Hamurza Aslanbekov informing them of the payment of their "salary" in the amount of 1,000 rubles, following reports from Governor I. O. Brylkin about their reconciliation with Kasai and his brothers.

Written sources from this period clearly demonstrate the damage inflicted on the Kabardian people by prolonged internecine strife. The danger of the final dismemberment of Kabardia was further intensified by the proximity of the Kuban Tatars, who supported the Kashkatau faction and participated in raids and plundering of the lands and villages belonging to Bemat Kurghoqo.

Russian officials were concerned that in resisting these raids, Bemat's forces might kill one of the sultans residing either in Kabardia or in Kuban, thereby provoking retaliation from the Crimean Khanate and risking severe destruction, which Russia sought to avoid, as it would weaken its position in the region. The balance of power in Kabardia thus remained unstable: the Kashkatau faction frequently sought support from the Crimean Khan and Kuban authorities, while the Baksan faction, led by Bemat, generally maintained alignment with Russia. This is confirmed by the report of Major Pyotr Tatarov, a Kabardian in Russian service, sent to Governor Brylkin in Astrakhan on June 10, 1752. According to this report, on May 28 Tatarov arrived in Kabardia and, in the Kubatyube tract near the Malka River, delivered Brylkin's letter to the Baksan princes Bemat and Qasey. The princes stated that they had repeatedly appealed to the governor to accept former sultans and accompanying Nogai murzas into their domain but had received no response. They intended to send a messenger to Astrakhan to clarify the governor's position and act accordingly. Bemat and Qasey themselves considered it beneficial to accept both the sultans and the Nogais, believing this would serve the interests of the Russian Empire.

== Reign ==
Bemat became the Grand Prince in 1753 after the death of Batoqo.

On April 30, 1753, the chancellor issued an order to dispatch the Samara Regiment and Kizlyar irregular troops from Astrakhan to Kabardia for the resettlement of the Kabardian owners of the Kashkatau group from Baksan to Kashkatau under "a considerable escort." In this regard, the Kalmyk Khan was to keep two thousand Kalmyk troops on standby to reinforce Majors Barkovsky and Pyotr Tatarov. In the event of disobedience from the Kashkatau party, a thousand Don Cossacks were to be prepared to cross into Kabardia. Russia's major miscalculation in Kabardia was its disregard for the activities of the Kaitukins and Bekmurzins, whose efforts had brought Kabardia closer to Russia under Peter the Great than even the entire Baksan party in the 18th century. Notably, it was the Baksan princes, led by Bemat Kurghoqo, who, dissatisfied with the decision of the court of forty representatives of the uzdens regarding territorial boundaries, secured the resettlement of the Kashkatau people to Cherek.

In the documents and essay by V. N. Sokurov, "Batoka Bekmurzin Valiy 1746–1752," Bemat is characterized as one of the principal instigators of internecine princely conflicts. In September 1753, the resettlement of the Kashkatau party to the Cherpeka region was completed, accompanied by the deployment of troops into Greater Kabardia (1,000 men), as reported by I. L. Frauendorf, commandant of Kizlyar, to the College of Foreign Affairs. On October 24, 1753, the princes of Greater Kabardia wrote to Empress Elizabeth Petrovna proposing the creation of a joint court of uzdens for both factions (twenty representatives from each), tasked with resolving territorial disputes and regulating relations between the groups. However, clashes between the factions continued, and Bemat was frequently identified as a leading instigator. Thus, in March 1761, Captain Alexander Kireyev of the Terek forces returned from Kabardia to Kizlyar, reporting to commandant I. F. Boksberg and the Astrakhan governor V. V. Neronov on his investigation into complaints by Kabardian rulers regarding the demands of the Crimean Khan. Kireyev brought two letters: one from Bemat, Qasey, and other Baksan leaders stating that they had not received the Sultan's children as ordered; and another from the Kashkatau princes requesting the immediate dispatch of Major Pyotr Tatarov to mediate grievances arising from their expulsion by the Baksan faction, and to arrange the exchange of Hamurza's son, who was being held as a hostage. Colonel Boksberg ordered Tatarov to proceed to Kabardia and prevent the Baksan faction from expelling their rivals, in order to avoid pushing them toward opposing alliances. Examination of these documents shows that Russian authorities were attempting to reduce the intensity of feudal conflict in Kabardia, which stemmed from land disputes, competition for supreme authority, political intrigue, the tradition of blood feud, and personal rivalries among the princes.

In March 1761, Jambot and other members of the Kashkatau faction again complained to Governor V. V. Neronov about the actions of the Baksan party. Violating prior agreements, the Baksan faction, led by Bemat, and allied with the Bechmirza family, forcibly seized lords, serfs, and settlements, and expelled their rivals from Kabardia. According to the Kashkatau princes, Bemat had violated his oath and accepted the sons of the Crimean khans under his protection. Neronov responded by demanding that the Baksan faction cease hostilities and expel the Sultan's sons as subjects of the Crimean Khan. Addressing Bemat and Qasey directly, together with their relatives, he wrote:

"the owners of the Kashkatov party, Dzhanbulat Kaitukin and Hamurza Raslanbekov, and others, brought a complaint to Captain Alexander Kireyev, who had previously been in Kabardia,"

and further stated that they were being driven from Chegem into territories beyond their control. Neronov reminded the Baksan leaders that they had agreed to remain within their respective territories—Baksan for one faction and Kashkatau for the other—with the Chegem River serving as a boundary neither side was to cross. He also warned of the Empress's "considerable wrath" should these agreements continue to be violated. Neronov combined warnings with conciliatory language, expressing hope for a final reconciliation and urging the Baksan princes not to accept subjects of the Ottoman Porte, form external alliances, or conduct raids. The Baksan princes replied that they would remain in conflict with Jambot indefinitely, though they were willing to comply with other imperial directives, and that the Sultan's sons had been expelled from Kabardia. Bemat Kurghoqo's refusal to reconcile with the Kashkatau faction effectively aligned his position with the interests of Crimea and the Ottoman Empire, both of which benefited from continued division among the Kabardian elite. A letter from Uzden Shabaz-Girey to the Kizlyar commandant N. A. Potapov, dated December 22, 1765, reports the death of Bemat Kurghoqo and mentions the Kabardian princes' request to the Crimean Khan to destroy the fortress under construction at Mozdok, as well as to release Bemat's son Dudaruko from captivity in Crimea.

The same letter states:

The Kabardian owners and uzdens, having gathered at a council, said: "we have not heard good words from either the Crimean Khan or Russia," and with great sorrow they dispersed, and then at another meeting they spoke of sending their envoy to the Russian court..."

Bemat Kurghoqo died in 1765. From legends concerning the Kabardian sage Jabagh Qazanoqo, it is known that Bemat was regarded as a stern but pious ruler. Described as large and imposing in appearance, he was energetic and intolerant of disobedience. Qazanoqo himself did not share Bemat's favorable disposition toward the Turks, and is credited with the following statement:

"Turkey is not Kabardia, and the water there is different. And the Adyghe cannot measure themselves by Turkish standards. There's no point in looking at other people's ways; we must establish our own. That's it."

== Sources ==
- Kardanov, Ch. E. (2016). Князья Кабарды [Princes of Kabarda] (in Russian). Nalchik: Izdatel'stvo M. i V. Kotlyarovykh. ISBN 978-5-93680-971-2.
