= Tatarkhan the Golden =

Kabardian prince (died 1737)

Tatarkhan Bechmirza
- Tatarkhan the Golden
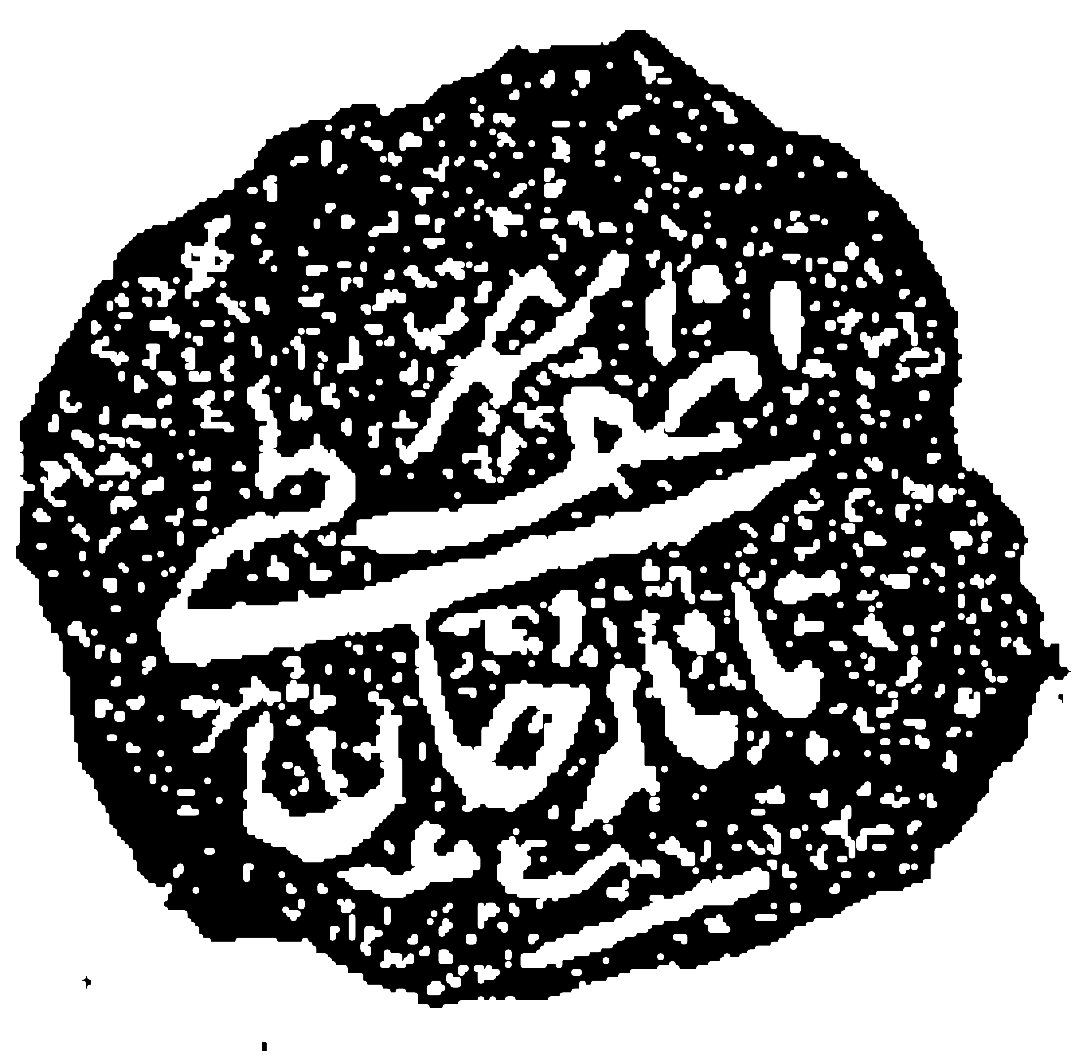
- 1719 seal of Tatarkhan

Grand Prince of Kabardia
- Reign: 1732 – 1737
- Predecessor: Yislambech Misost
- Successor: Aslanbech Qeytuqo
- Born: c. 17th century Kabardia
- Died: 1737; Kabardia
- Issue: Sons: Kurghoqo; Jankhot; Misost
Names
- Tatarkhan, son of Bechmirza
- Kabardian: Бэчмырзэ и къуэ Тэтэрхъан
- House: Inalid dynasty; House of Bechmirza
- Father: Bechmirza Jambot

Tatarkhan Bechmirza, (Note: Kabardian: Бэчмырзэ Тэтэрхъан Russian: Татархан Бекмурзин) also known as Tatarkhan the Golden (Note: Kabardian: Тэтэрхъан Дыщэ) was a Kabardian prince of the Bechmirza dynasty, who played a prominent role in Kabardia's political and military affairs during the early 18th century. He was the eldest son of Bechmirza Jambot and is frequently mentioned in contemporary Russian and Kabardian diplomatic correspondence connected to the region's relations with the Russian Empire.

Tatarkhan is known for his involvement in Kabardia's alliance with Russia during conflicts with the Crimean Khanate and Ottoman-aligned forces, particularly in the Trans-Kuban campaigns. He held positions of authority within Kabardia and was later elected Grand Prince from 1732 to 1736, jointly governing alongside rival noble factions during a period of internal division and external pressure.

== Biography ==
Tatarkhan was the oldest son of Bechmirza Jambot, the founder of the Bechmirza dynasty.

On 4 March 1711, Peter the Great addressed a letter to the Kabardian rulers, including Tatarkhan and his brothers, as well as the broader Kabardian and western Circassian population, agreeing further establishing closer relations with him to move in cooperation and protect the lands of Kabardia from neighbouring threats. In the letter, the tsar referred to complaints from the Kabardians regarding repeated raids by Crimea and Ottoman forces, from whose pressure they sought relief through Russian allegiance. He also responded to earlier Kabardian embassies requesting military assistance, urging them to demonstrate loyalty and service in the ongoing conflict against the Ottoman Empire and the Crimean Khanate, which he accused of violating prior agreements.

Peter I further assured the Kabardians that no taxes would be imposed upon them; instead, they would receive compensation for their service, particularly if they supported allied forces such as those of Ayuka Khan and the Cossack hosts. Additional instructions were reportedly conveyed through Alexander Bekovich-Cherkassky.

In September 1712, Kabardian nobles sent a follow-up letter to the tsar reporting their victory over Nuradin-Sultan and noting the failure of Russian authorities, including Fyodor Apraksin, to provide the expected military support. The document was signed by leading figures such as Hatokhshoqo and Yislambech Misost, Aslanbech Qeytuqo, and Tatarkhan Bechmirza, along with their uzdens.

The letter also refers to Alexander Bekovich-Cherkassky, under whose authority the Kabardian princes swore an oath of loyalty to Russia. They emphasized that, despite religious differences, they had fulfilled their obligations by engaging in battle against the forces of Nuradin-Sultan, reportedly numbering around 15,000 men. The Kabardians noted that had Russian support under Fyodor Apraksin arrived in time, they believed a decisive victory could have been achieved, potentially extending Russian influence from Taman on the Black Sea to Kabardia and the Terek region.

In their appeal, the Kabardian princes requested continued military assistance, particularly in the event of renewed attacks by Crimean or Kuban Tatar forces. They asked that allied troops under Ayuka Khan and the Terek Cossacks be instructed to support them when necessary. While affirming their willingness to fight and "shed their blood" in service to the tsar, they also warned that without timely aid, they risked being overwhelmed by the numerically superior forces of the Crimean Khanate.

In a letter dated 16 May 1713, Peter the Great expressed gratitude to the Kabardian princes—Tatarkhan Bechmirza, Aslanbech Qeytuqo, and Hatokhshoqo—for their courage during the Trans-Kuban campaign. Acknowledging their message delivered through Alexander Bekovich-Cherkassky, the tsar commended their service and reaffirmed his intention to rely on them in the struggle against Russia's enemies. Monetary rewards were sent via Kabardian uzdens residing in the capital.

The letter also addressed the issue of fugitive Kabardian peasants who had settled along the Terek and in Astrakhan. Peter stated that he would instruct the Kazan governor to investigate their numbers and the duration of their settlement, after which an appropriate decision would be made.

Although relatively little is recorded about the independent actions of Tatarkhan Bechmirza Jambot, his name consistently appears alongside that of Aslanbech Qeytuqo in contemporary sources. This suggests both his close alignment with Aslanbech and his participation in the Trans-Kuban campaign and related operations conducted in cooperation with Russia.

On 13 July 1713, Tatarkhan and Aslanbech jointly informed Alexander Bekovich-Cherkassky of demands issued by the Ottoman and Crimean authorities, who sought to hold the Kabardians accountable for the devastation of Kuban territories during the campaign, threatening reprisals in the event of noncompliance.

A message from the Crimean side accused the Kabardian princes of aiding Russian forces against their supposed sovereign and warned that refusal to submit would result in total destruction. In response, the Kabardians asserted that they had long been subjects of the Russian tsars and criticized the Crimean authorities for their neglect.

According to documents from 1713 to 1719, the Kabardians largely remained within the sphere of the Russian state, with many princes continuing in loyal service. Among the most notable were Tatarkhan Bechmirza, Yelmirza Bechmirza, Batoqo, Qeysin, Aslanbek Qeytuqo, Qanamat Qeytuqo, and Jambolet Qeytuqo. In their correspondence with Peter the Great and Russian authorities, Aslanbech and Tatarkhan, together with their relatives, repeatedly emphasized the need to strengthen Kabardia's defenses against increasingly frequent raids by Crimean Tatars, Trans-Kuban groups, Nogais, and other neighboring forces.

In 1720, during the invasion of Saadet Giray, Aslanbech Qeytuqo and Tatarkhan Bechmirza, who remained aligned with Russia, withdrew to the Cherek Gorge, where they fortified their position and requested permission to construct a defensive stronghold in the Beshtamak tract.

On 3 January 1721, Peter the Great informed them in a reply that the Astrakhan governor, A. P. Volynsky, had been instructed to provide protection and that they should seek his assistance when necessary. This was followed on 14 March by a decree from the Collegium of Foreign Affairs ordering Volynsky to take measures to defend the Kabardians from Ottoman and Crimean threats.

However, by the time Volynsky arrived in Kabardia, the Crimean forces had already withdrawn, rendering the assistance ineffective. The region soon descended again into internal conflict, compounded by a prolonged famine in the aftermath of the invasion. Volynsky described the dire conditions of the Kabardian nobility, noting their poverty and lack of basic means, while also praising their exceptional military capabilities.

"...the only thing I can praise is that all of them are warriors of a kind not found in these lands."

Amid this instability, the ongoing internecine struggle eventually compelled Aslanbech Qeytuqo and Tatarkhan Bechmirza to seek support from Bakhty-Girey, the Kuban sultan.

After the death of Yislambech Misost, Tatarkhan Bechmirza was elected as the Grand Prince of Kabardia. His authority extended the most over the four leading noble dynasties: Hatokhshoqo, Misost, Qeytuqo, and Bechmirza.

Tatarkhan Bechmirza held the position of Grand Prince from 1732 to 1736. In popular tradition, he is remembered as a peaceful and conciliatory ruler. A Kabardian proverb recorded by V. N. Sokurov;

"Мыщэ лъхуэри дыщэ къилъхуащ."

Translation:

"The bear gave birth to gold."

Is associated with his lineage, where the "bear" refers to Bechmirza Jambot, and "gold" symbolizes his son Tatarkhan's gentle and noble character.

Tatarkhan Bechmirza died in 1736/1737.

== Sources ==
- Kardanov, Ch. E. (2016). Князья Кабарды [Princes of Kabarda] (in Russian). Nalchik: Izdatel'stvo M. i V. Kotlyarovykh. ISBN 978-5-93680-971-2.
