= Alexander Bekovich-Cherkassky =

Russian military officer (died 1717)

Prince Alexander Bekovich-Cherkassky (Russian: Алекса́ндр Беко́вич-Черка́сский), born Devlet-Girei-mırza (Russian: Девлет-Гирей-мурза; died 1717), was a Russian officer of Circassian origin who led the first Russian military expedition into Central Asia.

== Background ==
A Muslim by birth, and the son of one of Kabarda's rulers, Alexander converted to Christianity and joined the Russian service, although the dates and circumstances of these events are not on record. In 1707, he was commissioned by Peter the Great to study navigation in Western Europe, and towards the end of 1711 he was back in Russia. From there, he was sent back to his native Kabarda and persuaded some powerful men there to support the Russian Tsar in his operations against the Ottoman Empire.

== Dreaming of Eldorado ==
Two years later, a Turkmen traveller arrived in Astrakhan and announced to local authorities that the Oxus River, formerly flowing to the Caspian Sea, had been diverted by the Khivans to the Aral Sea in order to extract golden sand from the river waters. Prince Gagarin, who was a local governor at that time, sent his envoys to the Khanate of Khiva in order to verify the fable. They returned with a sack of golden sand, allegedly extracted from the Oxus.

The fable was then given credit, and the Turkmen brought to Saint Petersburg. Tsar Peter, informed about the fabulous wealth of Khiva, was desperately in need of gold to proceed with the Great Northern War. On 14 February 1716, a contingent of 7,000 troops was placed under the command of Prince Bekovich-Cherkassky as a Muslim by birth and an expert in the art of warfare.

Bekovich-Cherkassky was commissioned: 1) to survey the river-bed of the Oxus and to report on the possibility of its diversion to the Caspian; 2) to force the Khivan khan into subservience; 3) to erect a chain of fortifications along the Oxus; 4) to send envoys to India in order to establish direct trade with the Mughal Empire.

== Khivan-Russo war of 1717 ==
Russo–Khivan War of 1717
Date	1717
Location	Khiva (present-day western Uzbekistan, southwestern Kazakhstan and much of Turkmenistan)
Result	Decisive Khivan victory: Russian invasion of Khiva repelled

Belligerents
Khiva	(Russian Empire) Russia

Commanders and leaders
Shir Ghazi	(Russian Empire) Peter the Great (Russian Empire) Alexander Bekovich-Cherkassky †

Strength
24,000	Total: 6,655; 3,727 infantry 617 cavalry 2,000 cossacks 26 artillery crew with 22 guns 232 marines several auxiliaries

Casualties and losses
Unknown	Almost all the troops killed or captured

Bekovich-Cherkassky received these orders in Astrakhan, where he was engaged in the surveying work, preparing the first map of the Caspian Sea. He was promoted captain and commanded a preliminary expedition in Turkmenistan. He left some of the Cossacks on his way in order to set up the forts in Krasnovodsk and Alexandrovsk.

Back in Astrakhan by February 1717, Bekovich raised another army and started towards Khiva, together with some engineers and land surveyors.

According to Mikhail Terentyev, Bekovich's army consisted of the following:

- 3,727 infantry
- 617 cavalry
- 2,000 cossacks
- 26 artillerists with 22 guns
- 232 marines
- 1 engineer with 2 apprentices
- 4 medics
- 21 nobles
- 2 interpreters
- 15 clerks and scribes
- 8 government clerks

Total: 6,655

It was many months later that several Tatars returned and brought the appalling news of the catastrophe that befell the Khivan expedition. The newly built forts in Turkmenistan were at once evacuated, and that at considerable loss from inclement weather and Turkmen tribesmen.

What exactly happened with Bekovich-Cherkassky remains a matter of some controversy. According to a few surviving members of his contingent, they advanced to within 120km from Khiva, when the khan attacked them with a 24,000-strong army. After three days of bloody fighting, the Khivans were routed.

Seeing that the enemy was very numerous, Bekovich-Cherkassky understood that diplomacy had a better chance of success. The Russian officer, accompanied only by 500 of his men, rode into the enemy's camp to propose terms. The khan pretended to surrender to him, welcomed him warmly, persuading him to divide the Russian army to dwell in five separate towns in order to facilitate foraging. The Khivans then attacked the five towns one by one, slaughtering most Russians, selling the others as slaves, and executing all Russian officers including Prince Cherkassky.

Peter the Great did nothing to avenge the defeat since he was still occupied by the war with Sweden, and also by the hostility of the Ottoman Empire. It was over a century later that the Russian Empire resumed its military expeditions into Central Asia.

== See also ==
- Khivan campaign of 1839
- Khivan campaign of 1873

== Bibliography ==
- Андреевский, И. Е., ed. (1891). "Бекович, Девлет-Кизден-Мурза" [Bekovich, Devlet-Kizden Murza]. Энциклопедический словарь Брокгауза и Ефрона (in Russian). Vol. 3: Банки – Бергер. СПб.: Семеновская Типо Литография (И. А. Ефрона). pp. 356–357 – via Wikisource.
