= Kabardian Civil War (1720–1736) =

- Part of Civil Wars in Kabardia
Date	1720 – 1736
Location	Kabardia
Result	Aslanbech's victory See more: List: 1725: Kashkatau victory; 1729: Bakhsan victory; 1736: Eventual victory for Aslanbech Qeytuqo; Qeytuqo, Hatokhshoqo, and Misost dynasties form an temporary alliance; Exile of the Bechmirza dynasty from Kabardia

Belligerents
Phase 1 (1720-1724): Kashkatau party; Qeytuqo dynasty; Bechmirza dynasty; Supported by: Russian Empire; Phase 2 (1724-1726): Kashkatau party; Qeytuqo dynasty; Bechmirza dynasty; Supported by: Crimean Khanate; Phase 3 (1726-1736): Kashkatau party; Qeytuqo dynasty	Phase 1 (1720-1724): Bakhsan party; Misost dynasty; Hatokhshoqo dynasty; Supported by: Crimean Khanate; Phase 2 (1724-1726): Bakhsan party; Misost dynasty; Hatokhshoqo dynasty; Supported by: Russian Empire; Phase 3 (1726-1736): Bakhsan party; Misost dynasty; Hatokhshoqo dynasty; Bechmirza dynasty

Commanders and leaders
Aslanbech Qeytuqo; Qanamat Qeytuqo †; Hamirza Aslanbech; Tatarkhan Bechmirza (Phase 1–2); Batoqo Bechmirza (Phase 1–2); Meñli II Giray (Phase 2); Bakhti Giray (Phase 2); Salikh-Giray Sultan † (Phase 2-3)	Yislambech Misost # Aledjuqo Aliy; Hatokhshoqo Misost # Bemat Kurghoqo; Qasey Hatokhshoqo; Tatarkhan Bechmirza (Phase 3); Batoqo Bechmirza (Phase 3); Saadet IV Giray # (Phase 1)

Strength
Unknown Various	Unknown; 40,000~ (In 1720) Various

The Kabardian Civil War of 1720–1736 was a dynastic and political conflict fought in Greater Kabardia between 1720 and 1736 between two rival Kabardian coalitions: Bakhsan Party, led primarily by the Misost and Hatokhshoqo princely houses, and the Kashkatau Party, centered around the Qeytuqo and Bechmirza dynasties. Triggered by escalating tensions between Kabardia and the Crimean Khanate following the attack of Kabardians into Chechen lands, when the Crimean-aligned Shamkhals of Tarki, who claimed Chechens as their subjects, reported the incursion to the Crimean Khanate. The conflict developed into a prolonged struggle over political supremacy, foreign alignment, and the future autonomy of Kabardia.

== Background ==
As a successor state to the Golden Horde, the Crimean Khanate claimed sovereignty over the Circassia. This political relationship was characterized primarily by the obligation of Circassian princes to pay tribute to the Crimean Khan, predominantly in the form of slaves. This tribute was demanded upon the ascension of a new Khan to the throne or levied as fines for crimes committed by Circassian subjects. When Circassian leaders refused to deliver the required number of captives, the Crimean leadership launched punitive military expeditions to enforce payment. These raids were justified by labelling the Circassians as "infidels". This justification became complicated from the 16th century onward as the Circassians increasingly converted to Islam; however Crimean Khans often ignored these conversions and rejected negotiations with Circassian envoys who pleaded over their shared religion.

Despite the presence of Islam, there was debate over whether the region was Dar al-Harb (the Abode of War), where slaves could be taken, or Dar al-Islam (the Abode of Islam), which would prevent enslavement. Despite some legal rulings (kanunname) suggesting Sharia should apply to certain tribes (which would protect them), the Ottoman state supported the Crimean Khan in enslaving Circassians, treating the region effectively as a source of slaves regardless of religious affiliation. It was not possible to determine whether the Circassians entering the Ottoman market were from Dar al-Harb or not, as both allied Muslim Circassians and non-Muslim Circassians were raided by the Khanate. The Circassians were described as "neither Christians nor Muslims" by a courtier of the Crimean Khan. Some Ottoman chroniclers mention that the Circassians fought against the Crimean Khanate because they could not stand the "Tatar tyranny and oppression" (Turkish: zülm ü cevre). In some cases, the Circassians pleaded with the Ottoman sultan directly, arguing that they were fellow Muslims, thus it was therefore "against the sharia to turn them into slaves". The Sultan withdrew permission for the Khan's campaigns based on this argument, although the Khan proceeded regardless.

== Prelude ==
In 1720, when several Kabardian princes appealed to Peter I of Russia for support against their regional opponents. In their letter the Kabardian nobles reported that, together with detachments of the Don Cossacks, they had carried out a punitive campaign against nearby Chechen settlements. According to the document, Kabardian and Cossack forces attacked several Chechen communities, inflicted notable casualties, seized property, and took a number of women and children captive.

Shortly after this campaign, Kabardia itself came under pressure from the Crimean Khanate. The Kabardian princes reported that forces of the Crimean khan, supported by Kuban Tatars and several Circassian groups that had broken away from Kabardia, conducted an incursion that devastated local supplies. This situation prompted the Kabardian leadership to request military assistance from Russia and to propose the construction of a Russian fortress in their territory.

The campaign inflicted heavy losses on the targeted clans and demonstrated Kabardia's loyalty to Russia, but the forces soon withdrew to their homeland without establishing permanent control over the area because of low supplies In August 1720, Aslanbech Qeytuqo and other Kabardian princes wrote to Peter I about their raids against the Chechens and asked him to build a town in their land:

"We hereby report to Your Royal Majesty that some peoples, called Chechens, who are your enemies, sovereign, and we, uniting with the Don Cossacks, attacked them, destroyed them and killed many. Their wives and children were taken captive, and their belongings and baggage were seized by the Don Cossacks. We hold so many of the captured captives in our custody to this day, and we pray to the Lord God that Your Royal Majesty may always achieve such victories over your enemies. From that captive supply, as a guarantee, we have sent to you, Your Royal Majesty, one boy and one girl, and every year we serve Your Royal Majesty without sparing our lives."

However, this angered the Shamkhals of Tarki, Aksal, and Endirey, who claimed Chechens as their subjects. The Shamkhals, who reacted harshly, reported this to the Crimean Khan for him to launch a punitive campaign against the Kabardians. Upon hearing this, the Kabardian princes appealed to Russia for help in repelling the Crimean invasion, and for the construction of a new fortress in Beshtamak area near Terek, to protect Kabardia.

== The civil war ==
=== First phase ===
The expulsion of Bakhty Giray from Kabardia and the subsequent Trans-Kuban campaign significantly worsened relations between the Kabardians and the Crimean Khanate. After coming to power in Bakhchisarai, Saadet IV Giray advanced with a force of approximately 40,000 troops to the Kabardian frontier and issued an ultimatum. The Crimean Khan sent a thousand well-armed seimen soldiers to Kabardia under the command of Salih Giray, the Sultan. By mid-June 1720, the Crimeans were encamped on Kyzburun. Salih Giray accepted the oath of allegiance to Crimea from the Misost and Hatokhshoqo families, in confirmation of which he demanded hostages and the payment of tribute in slaves.

Saadet Giray IV presented the following demands to the Jambot clan:

- Severance of relations with Russia
- Acceptance of Crimean citizenship and payment of a tribute of one yasyr from each household
- Relocation to the Kuban region

The first three points were mandatory; if they were not fulfilled, the khan threatened to destroy their homes, burn them down, and execute everyone. However, the Kabardians categorically refused all demands. Aslanbech's group declared that the Kabardian princes had never been under Crimean rule, but had long been allies of Russia. After this, Salih Giray Sultan gave the order to attack Kashkhatau. On June 24, 1720, the Crimean detachment stood at Tatartu.

During deliberations, the Misost faction and their allies proposed accepting these terms. Envoys were dispatched to Crimea offering 1,000 yasyrs as partial compensation, while warning that no tribute would be given if the khan resorted to military action. In response, the khan ordered the execution of the envoys and advanced his forces across the Kuban River.

These events led to a division within the Kabardian assembly (khasa) into two factions: one aligned with the Crimean-Ottoman side, including the Hatokhshoqo and Misost dynasties, led by Yislambech Misost, Bemat Kurghoqo, and others. Their faction was referred to as the "Bakhsan Party". On the other side, there was the "Kashkatau Party" including Qeytuqo and Bechmirza dynasties, led by Aslanbech Qeytuqo.

In the spring of 1720, Saadat Giray led a Crimean Tatar force into Kabardia, devastating and plundering several settlements while demanding compliance with his ultimatum. With his support, Yislambech Misost, leader of the pro-Ottoman Kabardian nobility, was proclaimed Grand Prince of Kabardia in 1721.

==== Assassination attempt ====
Recognizing that the Qeytuqeys and Bekmirzeys formed the obstacle to achieve control over Kabardia, the Crimean leadership resolved to neutralize them through a targeted political assassination. The plot was masterminded and executed by Sultan Salikh-Giray, the son of Khan Saadet-Giray. Salih-Giray maintained deep political ties within Kabardia, having been raised by the Misostey family under the traditional institution of Atalyk (foster-brotherhood).

In the summer of 1720, Sultan Salikh-Giray launched the operation, attempting to ambush and assassinate Prince Aslanbech Qeytuqo and members of the Bechmirza dynasty while they were within central Kabardian territory. However, the operation failed to achieve total surprise. Due to either tactical errors by the attackers or timely intelligence received by the targets, Aslanbech Qeytuqo and the Bechmirza leadership successfully evaded the trap and survived the assassination attempt completely unharmed.

Saadet Giray avoided further incursion into Kabardia due to a plague outbreak and withdrew to Crimea. Meanwhile, the Kashkatau faction, confined in the Cherek valley, appealed for Russian support. Yislambech Misost, relying on Crimean backing, attempted to blockade the settlement and cut off supply routes.

In spring 1721, Moscow dispatched Don Cossack forces in support of the Kashkatau party, which, together with Aslanbech's forces, defeated the Bakhsan faction on Nogai territory. On 16 May 1721, the Military Collegium raised the Kabardian issue before the Senate, seeking to determine whether aid could be provided without provoking conflict with the Ottoman Empire.

Only in mid-January 1721, after the battle on the Nalchik River, during which most of the Bakhsan nobles went over to the side of Qeytuqey village, were the Crimean troops expelled from the center of Kabarda. In this battle the Crimeans lost no fewer than 360 men killed. Despite the apparent success of the Kashkatau party, Crimea resumed its offensive against the descendants of Jembulat (the Bechmirza's and Qeytuqo's) in the spring of 1721.

Later that year, Astrakhan Governor A. P. Volynsky arrived in the Greben region with Cossack and Kalmyk detachments. He attempted to reconcile the warring Kabardian factions, secure oaths of loyalty, and obtain hostages. Yislambech Misost was taken into custody. In April 1722, Yislambech Misost sent a letter to the Russian Emperor pledging allegiance and offering his son and nephew as hostages. However, after his release, he resumed his alliance with the Crimean Khanate. He later reaffirmed his allegiance to Crimea and strengthened ties through marriage alliances, including the marriage of his daughter to Salih-Girey, then Kuban serasker.

Subsequently, Yislambech, Salih-Girey, Bemat Kurghoqo, and other leaders raised a joint force and attacked territories held by the Kashkatau faction. On 9 March 1723, the Collegium of Foreign Affairs reviewed Misost's case after reports confirmed his violation of oaths and collaboration with Crimean forces. Letters sent by Kashkatau leaders to Astrakhan Governor Ivan Kikin described ongoing sieges and requested Russian military assistance. Orders were issued for support from Kalmyk Khan Ayuka and the Don Cossacks, and diplomatic correspondence was sent to the Russian court. Despite these measures, relief was limited, and the Cherek settlement remained under siege.

=== Second phase ===
Following a change in Crimean leadership under Devlet Giray II, Aslanbech Qeytuqo sought rapprochement with Bakhchisarai. A political realignment followed, and alliances were reinforced through marriage between Qeytuqey family and the Crimean ruling house. The new khan appointed Bakhty-Girey as serasker in Kuban, who in turn negotiated an agreement with Aslanbech for the seizure of supreme authority in Kabarda and its incorporation under Ottoman influence.

These plans were ultimately disrupted. The Kabardian statesman Jabagh Qazanoqo played a key diplomatic role in maintaining peace and restoring relations with Russia. Under his influence, Yislambech Misost convened a khasa (council), which resolved to send an embassy to Peter the Great. The emperor received the delegation, relations were restored, and military assistance was again promised.

In 1724, Aslanbech Qeytuqo asked for military aid for Peter I, after receiving no answer to his request, he started to strengthen his ties with the new Crimean khan, Mengli II Giray. At this point, Peter the Great was in favour of the Bakhsan faction and the Kashkatau party allied with the Crimeans, both parties changing sides in the conflict. In April 1725, the Bakhsan leaders Yislambech Misost and other Hatokhshoqo princes capitulated and surrendered to Aslanbech, and the Kashkatau faction achieved a temporary victory against the Russian supported party of Bakhsan. After the defeat of the Bakhsan party at the Pshikov encampment in April 1725, the political situation in Greater Kabardia fell into disorder. For the first time in decades, Kabardia was forced to pay regular tribute to the Crimean Khanate, while Crimean troops remained stationed in Kabardian territory.

Although Prince Aslanbech Qeytuqo had achieved victory over his rivals, his position soon became unstable. Qeytuqey's dependence on Crimean military support damaged his reputation among the Kabardian nobility. Before 1724, he had been known as a strong defender of Kabardian independence and an opponent of Crimean influence. His later cooperation with the Crimean Khanate caused many nobles to turn against him. The Bekmirzey's, who had previously supported the Kashkatau coalition, abandoned Aslanbech and joined the remaining leaders of the defeated Bakhsan faction. This created a rare alliance between former rivals.

=== Third phase ===
==== Aslanbech's exile ====
Without the support of the Kabardian princes, Aslanbech Qeytuqo quickly lost his authority. Hoping to preserve his position, he requested a redistribution of lands and subjects from the ruling princes, but his request was rejected. Isolated politically and left without allies, Aslanbech fled Kabardia together with his brother and son, seeking refuge in the Crimean Khanate. Aslanbech's departure temporarily ended the open conflict between the Bakhsan and Kashkatau factions. In the following years, the Hatokhshoqo dynasty, Misost dynasty, and the Bechmirza dynasty formed a stable alliance that helped bring a period of relative unity and stability to Greater Kabardia during the late 1720s and early 1730s. This coalition allowed Kabardia to resist major external threats until the outbreak of the Russo-Turkish War in 1735.

After his exile, Aslanbech turned to the Kuban sultan Bakhti Giray for help, swore allegiance to him, and gave his daughter in marriage. Bakhti Giray, relying on the Crimean Khan's power, ravaged Greater Kabardia and began forcing the Kabardian princes to submit to his authority, demanding their resettlement to Kuban. In 1729, during another campaign against Kabardia, the Kuban serasker Bakhti Giray was killed in battle together with his brother Murad Sultan.

In 1730, the Ottoman Sultan removed the Crimean Khan Mengli Giray from power and reinstated Qaplan I Giray. His rival for the Khan's throne, Salih Giray, fled to his father-in-law, Prince Yislambech Misost. He took with him 2,000 Nogai families, approximately 35,000-40,000 people. Qaplan Giray, in turn, recognized Aslanbech Qeytuqo as the sole claimant to the throne of Kabardia, who in turn received a 19,000-strong army from the Khan. Aslanbech, in turn, swore allegiance to the Khan and promised to bring the entire region into submission.

==== Wars of Islambech ====
In 1729, Bakhty-Girey demanded renewed tribute in the form of yasyr (captives). He was later killed in a skirmish, after which Kabardian sources state that the annual obligation to provide captives to the Crimean Khan was effectively ended. E. J. Naloeva provides a more detailed account of the death of Bakhty-Girey and his brother Shabaz-Girey. According to her, in the spring of 1729, the forces of Deli-Sultan advanced toward the borders of Kabarda. During a fierce battle, Yislambech Misost struck Bakhty-Girey down with a saber. Naloeva further notes that this event had long-term consequences for Kabarda, stating that revenge "for the blood of two sultans" thereafter hung over the Kabardians like a prolonged threat, continuing for more than twenty years.

After entering Kabardia in late September 1731, the Crimean army under Arbibet Giray and Aslan Giray demanded that the Kabardians surrender the Nogai families who had fled from Kuban, hand over the retainers of the exiled prince Aslanbech Qeytuqo, and submit to retribution for the deaths of several Giray princes killed during previous Crimean invasions. The Kabardian princes rejected these demands and withdrew the population and livestock into the mountains while preparing for resistance. Unable to force a decisive engagement, the Crimean forces devastated the countryside by burning crops and hay supplies, taking captives, and ravaging settlements as they advanced deeper into the principality. Aslanbech himself was in the Crimean army during this attack.

Rather than remaining in central Kabardia, the Crimean army then marched east toward the Terek River, reportedly intending to attack the Terek Cossack settlements near Tatartup. Yislambech Misost, as the Grand Prince of Kabardia, seized the opportunity to pursue the retreating force. The Kabardian army, which numbered about 12,000 men, caught up with the Crimean host at the Zhyryshty crossing on the Terek River in early October 1731. As the Crimean troops attempted to cross the river, the Kabardians launched an attack, taking advantage of the difficult terrain and the disorder caused by the crossing. The battle ended in a decisive Kabardian victory. The Crimean army was routed at the crossing and forced to abandon its campaign, preventing its advance toward the Terek frontier.

=== Aslanbech's return to Kabardia ===
The outbreak of the Russo-Turkish War (1735–1739) fundamentally disrupted the political balance of the North Caucasus. In late 1736, taking advantage of the wartime instability, Aslanbech Qeytuqo returned from his exile in the Crimean Khanate. Upon his return, he reached an unexpected political compromise with his former rivals, the Bakhsan faction, particularly the Hatokhshoqo and Misost houses. This temporary alliance allowed Aslanbech to restore his political dominance and reclaim the title of Grand Prince of Kabardia. Jabagh Qazanoqo personally led the election campaign for Aslanbech, resulting in his victory. After Aslanbech became the prince, Qazanoqo was his closest advisor and influenced Aslanbech's Pan-Caucasian views. The first action of Prince Aslanbech was to introduce the principle that "only one state should exist between two seas" (the Black Sea and Caspian Sea) Aslanbech advocated for unification with other regions of the Caucasus, but did not have enough time or opportunity to fully implement this principle.

The formation of this new Bakhsan-Qeytuqey alliance quickly reversed the internal balance of power and left the Bechmirza clan politically isolated. After regaining power, Aslanbech sought revenge for what he viewed as the Bechmirza's betrayal. The Bakhsan nobility, prioritizing their own wartime security and political interests, supported the campaign against them. Isolated from their former allies and facing the combined opposition of the grand prince and the Bakhsan coalition, the Bechmirza dynasty was systematically stripped of its influence and driven into exile from Greater Kabardia.

== Aftermath ==
The political settlement reached in 1736 during the Russo-Turkish War (1735–1739) was only temporary. Although Aslanbech Qeytuqo was elected as the Grand Prince of Kabardia in 1737, the result of the conflict failed to resolve the deeper causes of the conflict—especially disputes over land and foreign alliances—the rivalry between the Bakhsan and Kashkatau factions resumed in 1742 over territory in the Bakhsan Valley, leading to another prolonged period of instability that lasted until 1757.

== Sources ==
- Kardanov, Ch. E. (2016). Князья Кабарды [Princes of Kabarda] (in Russian). Nalchik: Izdatel'stvo M. i V. Kotlyarovykh. ISBN 978-5-93680-971-2.
- Fidarova, Rita Zelimkhanovna (2007). "Conflict of Feudal Factions and Its Influence on the Decline of Kabarda's Independence (1720–1757)". Izvestiya VUZ. North Caucasus Region. Social Sciences. Special Issue (in Russian). ISSN 0321-3056.
- Aloev, T.Kh. (2018). "Battle at the Zhyryshty Crossing: The Kabardian-Crimean Campaign of 1731". Vestnik KBIGI. 4 (39): 27–44. doi:10.31007/2306-5826-2018-4-39-27-44.
- Malbakhov, Boris (2002). Кабарда на этапах политической истории (середина XVI–первая четверть XIX) века (in Russian). Поматур. ISBN 9785862081060.
