= Aslanbech the Red-Mustached =

Supreme Prince of Kabardia, 1737–1746

Aslanbech Qeytuqo
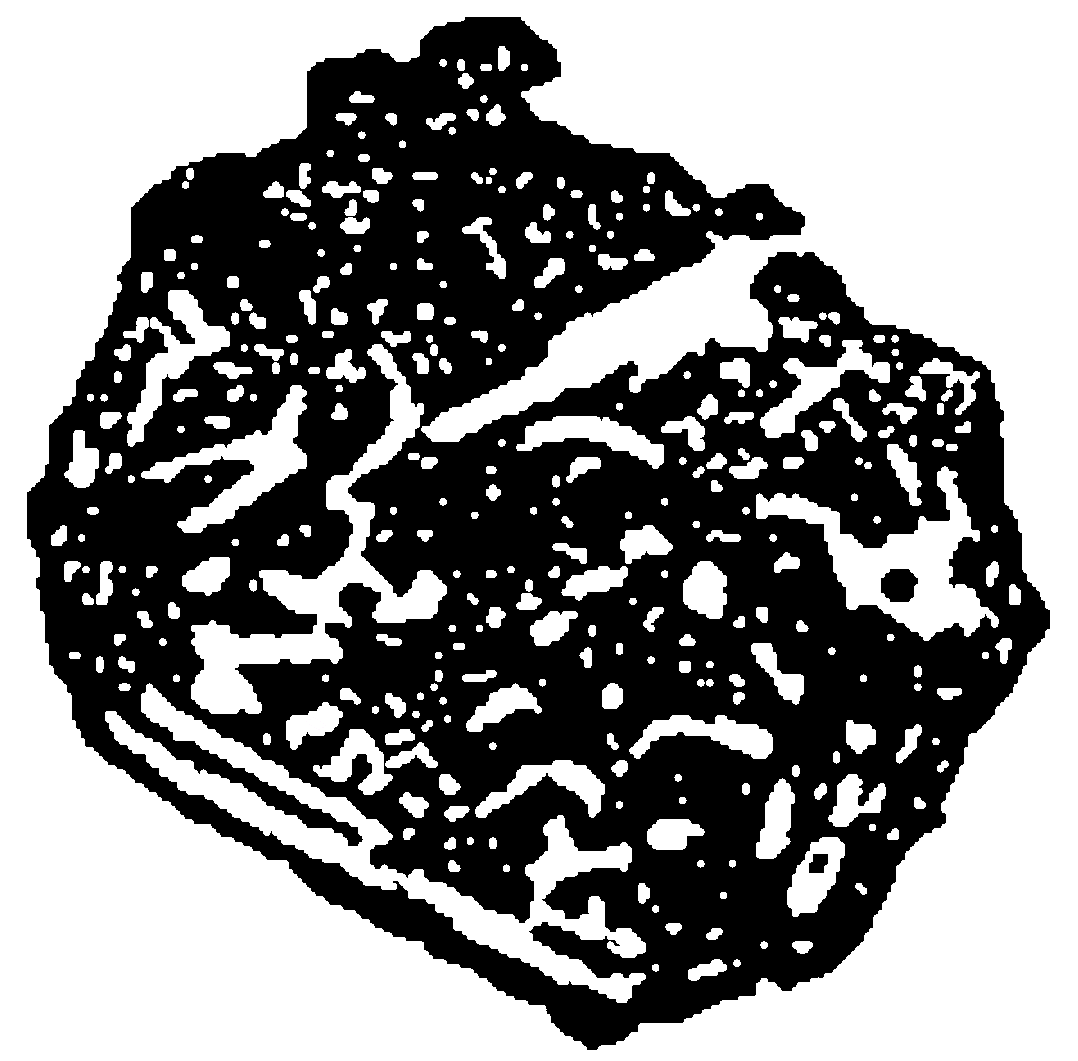
- 1719 seal of Aslanbech

Grand Prince of Kabardia
- Reign: 1737 – 1746
- Predecessor: Tatarkhan Bechmirza
- Successor: Batoqo Bechmirza
- Born: c. 1657; Kabardia
- Died: 1746; Kabardia
- Issue: Sons: Hamirza; Aslanuqo; Doletuqo; Dokhshuqo; Yelbezduqo; Daughters: One daughter (wife of Arslan Giray)
Names
- Aslanbech, son of Qeytuqo
- Kabardian: Къетыкъуэ и къуэ Аслъэнбэч
- House: Inalid dynasty; House of Jambot; House of Qeytuqo
- Father: Qeytuqo Jambot
- Religion: Sunni Islam
- Military career
- Nicknames: The Red-Mustached; The Bear; The Great; The Red
- Conflicts: Pruth River Campaign; Kuban campaign (1711); Kabardian Invasion of Chechnya (1720); Kabardian Civil War (1720–1736); Russo-Persian War (1722–1723); Battle of Derbent (1722); Russo-Turkish War (1735–1739); Kuban campaigns (1736–1739); Battle of Laba River (1739)

Aslanbech Qeytuqo (Note: Kabardian: Къетыкъуэ Аслъэнбэч), also known to Kabardians as Aslanbech the Red-Mustached, (Note: Kabardian: Аслъэнбэч ПащIагъуэ) Aslanbech the Bear, (Note: Kabardian: Аслъэнбэч Мыщэ) and Aslanbech the Great, (Note: Kabardian: Аслъэнбэчышхуэ) and referred to as Aslanbech the Red (Note: Karachay-Balkar: Сары-Асланбек Iron Ossetic: Сар-Аслæнбег) in Balkar and Ossetian folklore, was the Supreme Prince of Kabardia between 1737 and 1746. He was the eldest son of Prince Qeytuqo Jambot. His younger brothers were Qanamet and Jembulat.

== Biography ==
=== Early life ===
In his youth, he was educated by Jabagh Qazanoqo. Aslanbech's views and policy were influenced by his teacher.

Since the early 18th century, the North Caucasian peoples and their territories remained the subject of political and military struggle between Russia, the Ottoman Empire, and Persia. In 1696, Russia annexed Azov, and from 1700 onward, it waged the Great Northern War for access to the Baltic Sea, attempting to strengthen its position on the Black Sea and the Caspian coast. The conflict between Russia and the Ottomans over influence in Kabardia became acute in the early 18th century. The Ottoman Empire attempted to seize Kabardia. Thus, on the orders of Sultan Ahmed III, the Crimean Khan Qaplan I Giray deployed large military forces there in 1708. Ahmed III also demanded that Peter I destroy the newly built ports in Taganrog and on the Don, where Russian warships were stationed to avoid Russians protecting Kabardians.

Aslanbech's advisor Jabagh Qazanoqo opposed the idea of Circassians living under another country, and believed that the Tatars wished to eventually annex Circassia, so he suggested Russia as a possible defensive ally. After the Kabardian victory at the Battle of Kanzhal, Peter I, who wanted to prevent another Crimean invasion, sent Prince Alexander Bekovich Cherkassky, a noble Kabardian aristocrat in Russian service, to Kabardia. Cherkassky swore allegiance to his fellow Kabardian princes; the governor of Azov, F. M. Apraksin, followed suit, promising that Russia would protect them and defend them from invaders. Thus in 1711, the Russian Tsar Peter I The Great sent a letter to Kabardia, proposing for Kabardians to become a Russian subject just like the Kalmyk Khanate, knowing about the friendly relations between Kalmyks and Kabardians. In the letter, the Tsar said:

"And if you become our subjects, then not only will we not demand any taxes from you, but we will also determine the annual salary to give you, as our subject Ayuka Khan receives from us and as you were previously subjects of our ancestors and received a salary from them; and we will order you to assist him, Ayuka Khan, with the Kalmyks and the Don, Yaik and Greben Cossacks"

This offer was accepted and Kabardians, Russians, and Kalmyks formed an alliance. In 1722, there were further diplomatic meetings with Russia, and Qazanoqo represented Aslanbech.

Aslanbech believed that the struggles between princes, lords and khans must end and the unity of the tribes should be ensured in order to gather first Kabardia and then the whole Caucasus under a state roof. He gained the support of Jabagh Qazanoqo in this endeavor. In pursuit of this, Aslanbech, with assistance from his allies, conducted several successful campaigns on Kabardia's neighbors, including Ossetians, Chechens, Balkars, Abazins, and other North Caucasian peoples to strengthen his presence in the region.

In 1711, the Governor of Astrakhan, P. M. Apraksin, led a campaign against Kuban together with Kalmyks and Kabardians. On August 30, five thousand Kabardians under the command of Princes Tatarkhan Bechmirza and Aslanbech Qeytuqo, marched one hundred versts and, after a short battle on the banks of the Kuban River, routed a 10,000-strong army of the Nureddin and about 150 Nekrasovites. They pursued the enemy for two hours, killed 359 and captured 40 men, and seized 2,700 horses. Many Nogais drowned trying to escape across the river. The Nureddin, wounded in the leg, escaped with only a small number of people. Few Nekrasovites survived. The Kabardians lost 70 killed and 120 wounded. In 1712, the Posolsky Prikaz rewarded both princes with furs worth 3,000 rubles and 2,000 rubles in cash, and on May 16, 1713, Peter I sent a letter of gratitude.

In August 1720, Aslanbech, along with princes like Tatarkhan Bechmirza and Batoqo Bechmirza, led a Campaign against the Chechen clans on the lower Sunzha. Aslanbech ravaged the lands of the Chechens until he had to retreat because of a low supply caused by the Crimean raids on Kabardia.

=== Civil War in Kabardia ===
As a successor state to the Golden Horde, the Crimean Khanate claimed sovereignty over Circassia. This political relationship was characterized primarily by the obligation of Circassian princes to pay tribute to the Crimean Khan, predominantly in the form of slaves. This tribute was demanded upon the ascension of a new Khan to the throne or levied as fines for crimes committed by Circassian subjects. When Circassian leaders refused to deliver the required number of captives, the Crimean leadership launched punitive military expeditions to enforce payment. These raids were justified by labelling the Circassians as "infidels". This justification became complicated from the 16th century onward as the Circassians increasingly converted to Islam; however, Crimean Khans often ignored these conversions and rejected negotiations with Circassian envoys who pleaded over their shared religion.

Despite the presence of Islam, there was debate over whether the region was Dar al-Harb (the Abode of War), where slaves could be taken, or Dar al-Islam (the Abode of Islam), which would prevent enslavement. Despite some legal rulings (kanunname) suggesting Sharia should apply to certain tribes (which would protect them), the Ottoman state supported the Crimean Khan in enslaving Circassians, treating the region effectively as a source of slaves regardless of religious affiliation. It was not possible to determine whether the Circassians entering the Ottoman market were from Dar al-Harb or not, as both allied Muslim Circassians and non-Muslim Circassians were raided by the Khanate. The Circassians were described as "neither Christians nor Muslims" by a courtier of the Crimean Khan. Some Ottoman chroniclers mention that the Circassians fought against the Crimean Khanate because they could not stand the "Tatar tyranny and oppression" (Turkish: zülm ü cevre). In some cases, the Circassians pleaded with the Ottoman sultan directly, arguing that they were fellow Muslims, thus it was therefore "against the sharia to turn them into slaves". The Sultan withdrew permission for the Khan's campaigns based on this argument, although the Khan proceeded regardless.

In 1720, the Crimean-Circassian war of 1720-1726 started, complicated by the civil strife between the Anti-Crimean Kashkatau Party, which Aslanbech was a part of, and the Pro-Crimean Bakhsan Party.

In 1720, Saadet IV Giray (as revenge for the Kabardian invasion of Kuban and Chechnya) invaded Kabardia with 40,000 troops, demanding allegiance to the Ottoman Empire and Crimean Khanate, 4,000 jasyrs, and restitution for past losses. Pro-Crimean princes capitulated, while Kashkatau party leaders fortified the Cherek Fortress. A khasa was convened, attended by princes, Tlekotlesh, and representatives of the peasants. They discussed the current situation and the dispatch of an embassy to St. Petersburg. The Misosts' supporters prevailed at the meeting; reasonable proposals were rejected, and it was decided to accept the Crimean terms and pay a shameful tribute of 1,000 yasyrs "for the dishonor" of Kaplan Giray, "and if he, the khan, were to march on Kabardia, they would give nothing." They sent ambassadors with this proposal to the khan, who executed them and moved his troops across the Kuban. Those who disagreed with Yislam Misost's decision united around Aslanbech and his supporters and retreated into the mountains.

The Qeytuqo and Bechmirza families, representatives of the Jambot clan, according to V.N. Sokurov, left with their people for Kashkatau. In other words, Aslanbech returned to his former possessions and built the Cherek town.

The Crimean Khan sent a thousand well-armed seimen soldiers to Kabardia under the command of Salih Giray, the Sultan. By mid-June 1720, the Crimeans were encamped on Kyzburun. Salih Giray accepted the oath of allegiance to Crimea from the Misost and Hatokhshoqo families, in confirmation of which he demanded hostages and the payment of tribute in slaves.

Saadet Giray IV presented the following demands to the Jambot clan:

- Severance of relations with Russia
- Acceptance of Crimean citizenship and payment of a tribute of one yasyr from each household
- Relocation to the Kuban region

The first three points were mandatory; if they were not fulfilled, the khan threatened to destroy their homes, burn them down, and execute everyone. However, the Kabardians categorically refused all demands. Aslanbech's group declared that the Kabardian princes had never been under Crimean rule, but had long been allies of Russia and served it faithfully. After this, Salih Giray Sultan gave the order to attack Kashkhatau. On June 24, 1720, the Crimean detachment stood at Tatartu.

At the end of June, the Crimeans attacked the lands of the Kabardians. They destroyed villages, trampled crops and "burned the hay in stacks". The fortress "Chereksky Gorodok", built in a relatively short time in the Kashkatau tract, was besieged. Kabardians also took part in the attack and siege; Pshipshoqo Hatokhshoqo led 1,000 horsemen against Aslanbech. The besieged found themselves in a difficult situation. While there is no definitive information about losses in manpower, it is known that the Crimeans stole about three hundred horses, a thousand cows, and five thousand sheep. Soon, serious disagreements arose between the Jambots. The Bechmirzas proposed reconciliation with the khan, the Misosts, and the Hatokhshoqos. Aslanbech categorically objected, but the majority sided with the Bechmirzas. Then Qeytuqo declared that he himself would immediately go to the Russian Tsar for help. On the way to Terek, Aslanbech managed to conclude a military-political alliance with the Shamkhal of Tarki, Adil Giray, and the Kalmyk Khan, Ayuka Khan, about which he notified the Terek commandant, V.I. Zaozersky. On July 4, 1720, upon arrival in Terek, Qeytuqo submitted a letter to the commandant in which he stated:

“The Kabardians have all joined forces and driven me out of Kabardia, and if your grace writes about me, do not trust them and do not separate me from the great sovereign.”

The Bechmirzas soon revised their decision: they sent for Aslanbech and brought him back. By mutual consent, at the end of July 1720, Prince Sultanaliy, Aslanbech's maternal brother, was sent to St. Petersburg to see the tsar. Sultanaliy's departure soon became known in the enemy camp. A visit by the khan's envoy, Agha Ismail, to the Cherek town followed. He was primarily interested in the reason for sending an ambassador to the tsar. The answer was straightforward: for help. An argument ensued, and ultimately Agha Ismail's diplomatic mission failed.

Soon the Crimeans launched another attack, prompting the Jambots to appeal to the Russian government to expedite military assistance. The princes' message, as well as the testimony of Kabardian ambassadors taken before the Collegium of Foreign Affairs, detailed the disasters and devastation brought by the Crimean Khan and urgently requested the construction of a Russian fortress in the Beshtamak tract of Kabardia. Informing the government of the impending danger, the princes wrote:

“If this winter there is no help or helping hand for us, then we report that we will not be yours, for our strength is gone against such enemies... And if, by the permission of your royal majesty, Kabardia and the Kabardian peoples are of no use to you and you are a great sovereign, please inform us and we will defend ourselves as best we can”

The siege of the Cherek town dragged on. Ultimately, all efforts by the Crimeans and the noble militia of the Misosts and Hatokhshoqos to capture the fortress proved futile. In December 1720, the khan and his army retreated from that town to the Kuban. Having established his camp there, Saadet Giray began sending detachments throughout Kabardia to collect tribute. As a Russian source states: "The best wealth was cattle, but the Crimeans robbed them all of it."

The behavior of the khan's troops provoked acute discontent among the country's population. Archival sources report that in November 1720, Shirin Bey, together with Pshiapshoqo Hatokhshoqo, drove "500 cows" and several thousand sheep confiscated from the population to feed the Crimean Khan. Informed of this promptly, the nobles of Aslanbech launched a surprise attack, routing them and taking back the livestock, which served as a pretext for intensifying military action. The Crimeans and the nobles of the Misosts and Hatokhshoqos again stormed the fortress without success. Moreover, during the attack, Pshipshoqo along with 15 Crimean and Kabardian nobles were killed, and 100 were wounded. The noble Crimean Tatar Mubarek Shirin Bey, who was higher in rank than a murza, was captured by the besieged forces, seriously wounded, and died inside the fortress.

In early December 1720, an envoy from the Kalmyk Khan Ayuka arrived in Kabardia. In accordance with a secret order he received from A.P. Volynsky, he gathered information on the country's internal political situation. The Kalmyk envoy first visited Kyzburun, the headquarters of Hatokhshoqo Misost. Here he met with the Crimean sultans Salih Giray and Abaz Giray. The latter declared that they were still at war with Qeytuqo, did not want peace, and urged him to capture Prince Aslanbech by deception and give him to them, promising 30 slaves and 30 suits of armor as a reward. The envoy agreed "for appearance's sake" and told Aslanbech everything. The conspiracy hatched against Qeytuqo culminated in a major clash on the Nalchik River in January 1721.

Over 2,000 warriors participated in the battle on the side of the Jambots. Salih Giray's detachment consisted of approximately 1,000 horsemen, while Yislambech Misostov fielded 700 nobles. During the battle, most of the Kabardian nobles suddenly defected to Aslanbech Qeytuqo's side. As a result, the Crimean troops were routed and fled from Greater Kabardia. At the site of the battle alone, the Crimeans left 360 dead. Retreating, the Crimean detachments and the Misost nobles decided to fortify themselves in the Qudenet villages on the Chegem. However, the local population did not allow the Crimeans and their Kabardian princes into their homes and drove them away.

=== Persian campaign ===
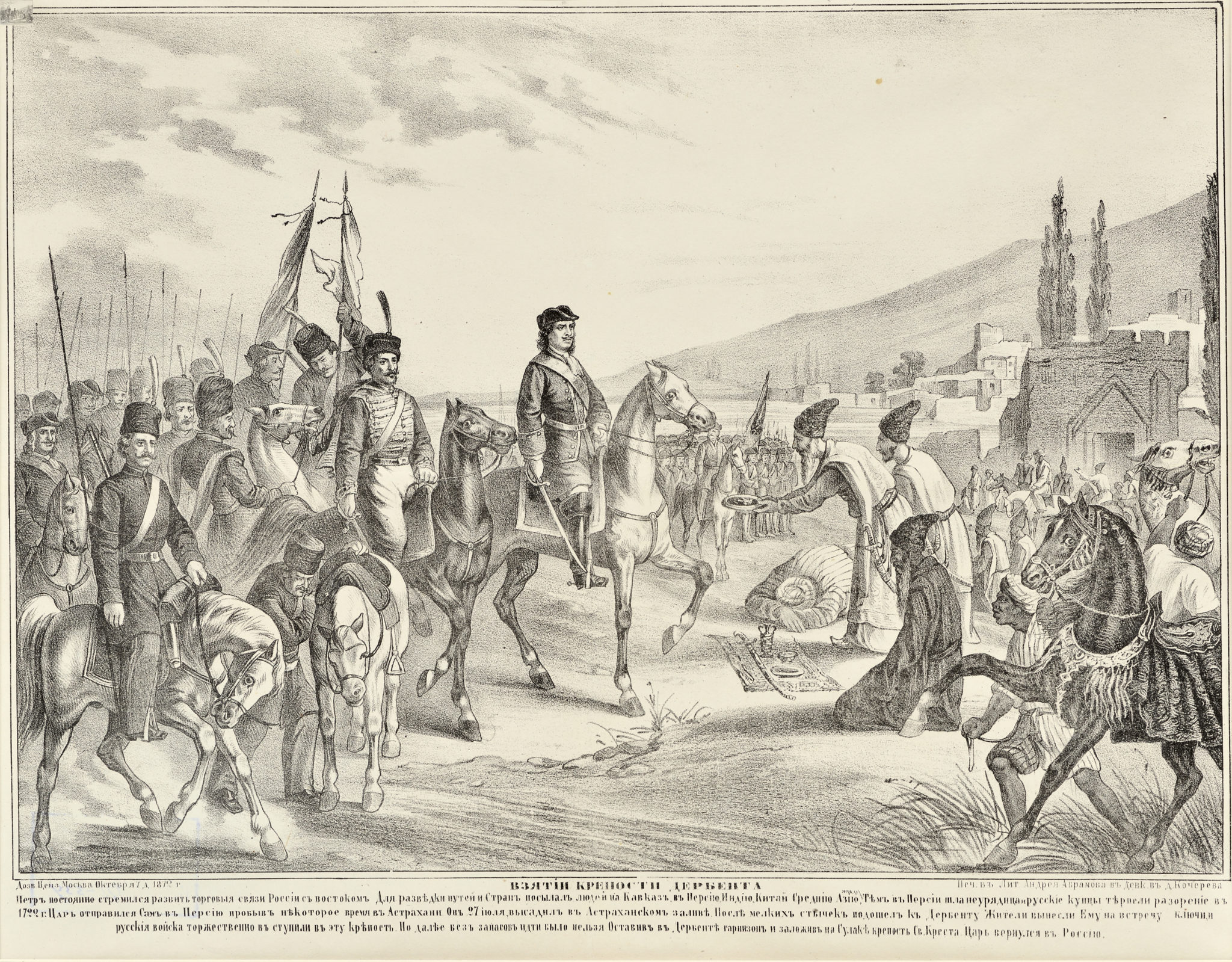
Entrance of Peter the Great in Derbent

Aslanbech participated in the Persian campaign of Peter the Great on the Russian side. According to E. J. Naloeva, a record from September 2, 1722, was preserved in the travel journal:

“The Kabardian ruler Aslanbek was informed through conversations that he, His Imperial Majesty, a high-ranking personage, could see him tomorrow.”

Aslanbech received an audience with Emperor Peter the Great on September 3. There is no record of their conversation. Other entries in the war diary also attest to Aslanbech's participation in the Persian campaign. For example, on September 12, enemy troops appeared in the mountains of the Utemshinsky domain, threatening to attack the Russian convoy. E. J. Naloeva cites the diary entry:

"That day, the Kabardian ruler Aslanbek and Elmurza Cherkassky with their men were dispatched along with the Don Cossacks... to obtain prisoners of war, three of whom this party had captured."

=== Alliance with Crimea ===
From 1722 to 1724, conflicts continued. The Bechmirzas and Qeytuqos remained besieged in the Kashkatau area, defending themselves entirely with their own resources. In 1724, Aslanbech Qeytuqo asked for military aid from Peter I. After receiving no answer to his request, he started to strengthen his ties with the new Crimean khan, Mengli II Giray. At this point, Peter the Great shifted his favor toward the Bakhsan faction, which caused the Kashkatau party to ally with the Crimeans—effectively leading both parties to swap their international allegiances.

Following this change in Crimean leadership under Meñli II Giray, Aslanbech Qeytuqo sought a rapprochement with Bakhchisarai. A political realignment followed, and alliances were reinforced through marriage between the Qeytuqey family and the Crimean ruling house. The new khan appointed Bakhty-Girey as serasker in Kuban, who in turn negotiated an agreement with Aslanbech for the seizure of supreme authority in Kabardia and its incorporation under Ottoman influence.

These plans were ultimately disrupted. The Kabardian statesman Jabagh Qazanoqo played a key diplomatic role in maintaining peace and restoring relations with Russia. Under his influence, Yislambech Misost convened a khasa (council), which resolved to send an embassy to Peter the Great. The emperor received the delegation, relations were restored, and military assistance was again promised.

In April 1725, despite these diplomatic turns, the Bakhsan leaders Yislambech Misost and other Hatokhshoqo princes ultimately capitulated and surrendered to Aslanbech at the Pshiqo encampment. The Kashkatau faction achieved a temporary victory over the Russian-supported Bakhsan party.

Following the defeat of the Bakhsan party in April 1725, the political situation in Greater Kabardia fell into disorder. For the first time in decades, Kabardia was forced to pay regular tribute to the Crimean Khanate, while Crimean troops remained stationed in Kabardian territory. Although Prince Aslanbech Qeytuqo had achieved victory over his rivals, his position soon became unstable. Qeytuqey's dependence on Crimean military support damaged his reputation among the Kabardian nobility. Before 1724, he had been known as a strong defender of Kabardian independence and an opponent of Crimean influence. His later cooperation with the Crimean Khanate caused many nobles to turn against him. The Bechmirzas, who had previously supported the Kashkatau coalition, abandoned Aslanbech and joined the remaining leaders of the defeated Bakhsan faction, creating a rare alliance between former rivals.

=== Exile ===
Without the support of the Kabardian princes, Aslanbech Qeytuqo quickly lost his authority. Hoping to preserve his position, he requested a redistribution of lands and subjects from the ruling princes, but his request was rejected. Isolated politically and left without allies, Aslanbech fled Kabardia together with his brother and son, seeking refuge in the Crimean Khanate.

=== Struggle for power ===
After his exile, Aslanbech turned to the Kuban sultan Bakhti Giray for help, swore allegiance to him, and gave his daughter in marriage. Bakhti Giray, relying on the Crimean Khan's power, ravaged Greater Kabardia and began forcing the Kabardian princes to submit to his authority, demanding their resettlement to Kuban. In 1729, during another campaign against Kabardia, the Kuban serasker Bakhti Giray was killed in battle together with his brother Murad Sultan.

In 1730, the Ottoman Sultan removed the Crimean Khan Mengli Giray from power and reinstated Qaplan I Giray. His rival for the Khan's throne, Salih Giray, fled to his father-in-law, Prince Yislambech Misost. He took with him 2,000 Nogai families, approximately 35,000-40,000 people. Qaplan Giray, in turn, recognized Aslanbech Qeytuqo as the sole claimant to the throne of Kabardia, who in turn received a 19,000-strong army from the Khan. Aslanbech, in turn, swore allegiance to the Khan and promised to bring the entire region into submission.

In the summer of 1731, Crimean troops led by Arslan Giray and Aslanbech approached the borders of Kabardia. They demanded a ransom "for the blood" of the two sultans (Bakhti and Murad), at the rate of one yasyr from each household. The Vali of Kabardia, Yislambech Misost, frightened by the real threat of invasion by Crimean troops led by his rival Aslanbech Qeytuqo, expressed his willingness to recognize Russia's protection over Kabardia and convened a khasa to discuss the matter. The deputies unanimously agreed to swear allegiance to Russia to the new empress. In accordance with the decision of the imperial court, the commandant of the Holy Cross fortress, General D. F. Yeropkin, advanced Russian troops to the borders of Kabardia. The Crimeans began a retreat, eventually being defeated by the combined forces of Salih Giray's Kabardians and Nogais.

In 1732, the senior prince-vali of Kabardia, Yislambech Misost, died. The Kabardian princes gathered for a council (khasa) to elect a new prince-vali. Overriding the rights of the elder Aslanbech, his cousin Tatarkhan the Golden, who enjoyed Russian support, was elected senior prince. His opponent, Aslanbech, was in Crimea at the time and held a pro-Crimean orientation.

=== Return to Kabardia and becoming the Grand Prince ===
In 1737, Aslanbech Qeytuqo plotted against Tatarkhan, allying with the princes of the opposing faction (the Hatokhshoqo and the Misosts). Tatarkhan fled with his brothers to Astrakhan. Through the mediation of the Russian authorities, who highly valued his loyalty, the senior prince of Kabardia and his brothers returned to Kabardia and reconciled with Aslanbech.

In the summer of 1737, after the death of Tatarkhan, Aslanbech was elected the new Grand Prince of Kabardia. That same year, through the mediation of the Kalmyk Khan Donduk-Ombo, a reconciliation was reached between the leaders of the Kashkatau and Bakhsan parties—the two most powerful Kabardian princes, Aslanbech and Bemat. Aslanbech, elected senior prince of Kabardia, swore an oath of allegiance to Russia.

Jabagh Qazanoqo personally led the election campaign for Aslanbech, resulting in his victory. After Aslanbech became the prince, Qazanoqo was his closest advisor and influenced Aslanbech's Pan-Caucasian views. The first action of Prince Aslanbech was to introduce the principle that "only one state should exist between two seas" (the Black Sea and Caspian Sea) Aslanbech advocated for unification with other regions of the Caucasus, but did not have enough time or opportunity to fully implement this principle.

=== Kuban campaigns ===
In 1736 a 2,000-strong Kabardian detachment led by Aslanbech, Bemat Kurghoqo, and Qasey Hatokhshoqo, arrived in Kuban and helped Kalmyks on their campaign against Nogais. During continuous attacks, on the 37th day of the siege, the Kuban mirzas were forced to negotiate, agreeing to accept Russian allegiance. Two hundred Nogai mirzas from four families, along with their sultan, signed a written oath of allegiance and gave their sons as hostages. The mirzas also received assurances from the Russian side that after the war they would remain under Russian protection and would not be handed over to the Ottomans. The Nogai rulers were ordered to migrate to the regions along the Terek River, Malka, and Kuma rivers, near the Russian frontier, where they immediately began to move.

In the spring of 1739, the Kabardians, along with the Kalmyks who had voluntarily joined them, launched a campaign against Kuban. They were led by Aslanbech himself. In December, he reported to St. Petersburg that, with the Kalmyk Khan Ombo, they went beyond the Laba River. And to the top of the Khevz River. They took five thousand Bezlaya villages and two thousand Begbai villages. In the summer of the same year, when the Crimeans, having unexpectedly attacked Kabardia, along with the Chemguy Circassians, attacked Kabardian summer pastures, capturing 500 people and seizing about 200,000 sheep and 7,000 cattle. However, shortly after the Ottoman defeat at the Battle of Stavuchany on August 17, the Kabardian and Kalmyk forces mounted a counterattack. On August 20, they confronted Kazi-Girey's forces near the Laba River. In the ensuing battle, the Crimean-led forces were defeated; many were killed or captured, and Kazi-Girey himself was mortally wounded.

=== Later life ===
In the 1740s, Aslanbech continued the struggle against the Bakhsan faction, led by the Hatokhshoqo and Misost dynasties. Aslanbech, along with his vassals and subjects, abandoned the Kashkatau tract and resettled in the mountains, on the Chegem River, where he occupied lands belonging to the princes of the Bakhsan faction. The Bakhsan faction did everything in its power to prevent Aslanbech Qeytuqo from returning from the Pyatigorsk region to his former residence in the Bakhsan valley. In 1744, tensions escalated with an assassination attempt on Qasey Hatokhshoqo by Aslanbech Qeytuqo's men.

In 1744, the Russian government sent Brigadier Pyotr Koltsov "with a small detachment" to Kabardia to reconcile the warring parties. Koltsov supported the Bakhsan party and initially met with Bemat Kurghoqo. The head of the Kashkatau party, Aslanbech, and his cousin, Batoqo Bechmirza, sent their nephew, Misost, the son of the former senior prince of Kabardia, Tatarkhan, to meet Koltsov. During the meeting with the leaders of both warring parties, Brigadier Pyotr Koltsov demanded that Aslanbech and the other princes of the Bakhsan party surrender their arms.

Aslanbech expressed dissatisfaction with the Russian government's unequal treatment of their party relative to the Bakhsan party. He agreed to reconcile with the Bakhsan party, but only on the condition that "whoever judges us in our affairs and, as for my subject people's possessions on Baksan, I would be given them and be placed on my father's estate on Baksan with all my possessions." Aslanbech insisted on the return of his ancestral lands in the Bakhsan Valley.

In September 1745, Crimean Tatars raided Abaza villages owned by Aslanbech. The Kuban serasker, arriving with an army, demanded tribute, to which the Abazins refused, declaring that they were Russian subjects. The Kubans then stole their horses; their demands for their return were refused. Assembling a detachment, the Abazins, Chemguys, their owners, and the Uzdens, except for Qeytuqo, organized a pursuit and, catching up with the serasker's detachment on the Laba River, killed the Nogai murza Kasai Syrtlanov and up to 100 of his warriors. On their side, the Abazin nobleman Qasey Lou and up to 80 Uzdens were killed.

The last document mentioning the name of Prince Aslanbech is the explanation of the uzdens of Kabardia (1753) to the Kabardian land map of 1744. According to V.N. Sokurov, Aslanbech bore the nickname Myshche, which meant "the Bear". The Balkars called him Sary, meaning "the Red". Judging by his nicknames, he was a man of strong build, with reddish hair; according to documents, he was a courageous and brave warrior with a strong character, capable of unconventional solutions.

Aslanbech died after falling from his horse beyond the Kuma River (now the Mineralnye Vody region), where he was heading due to a locust plague. A burial mound was erected over his grave in June 1746.

== In folklore ==
=== Ossetian folklore ===
==== Yese Kanukov ====
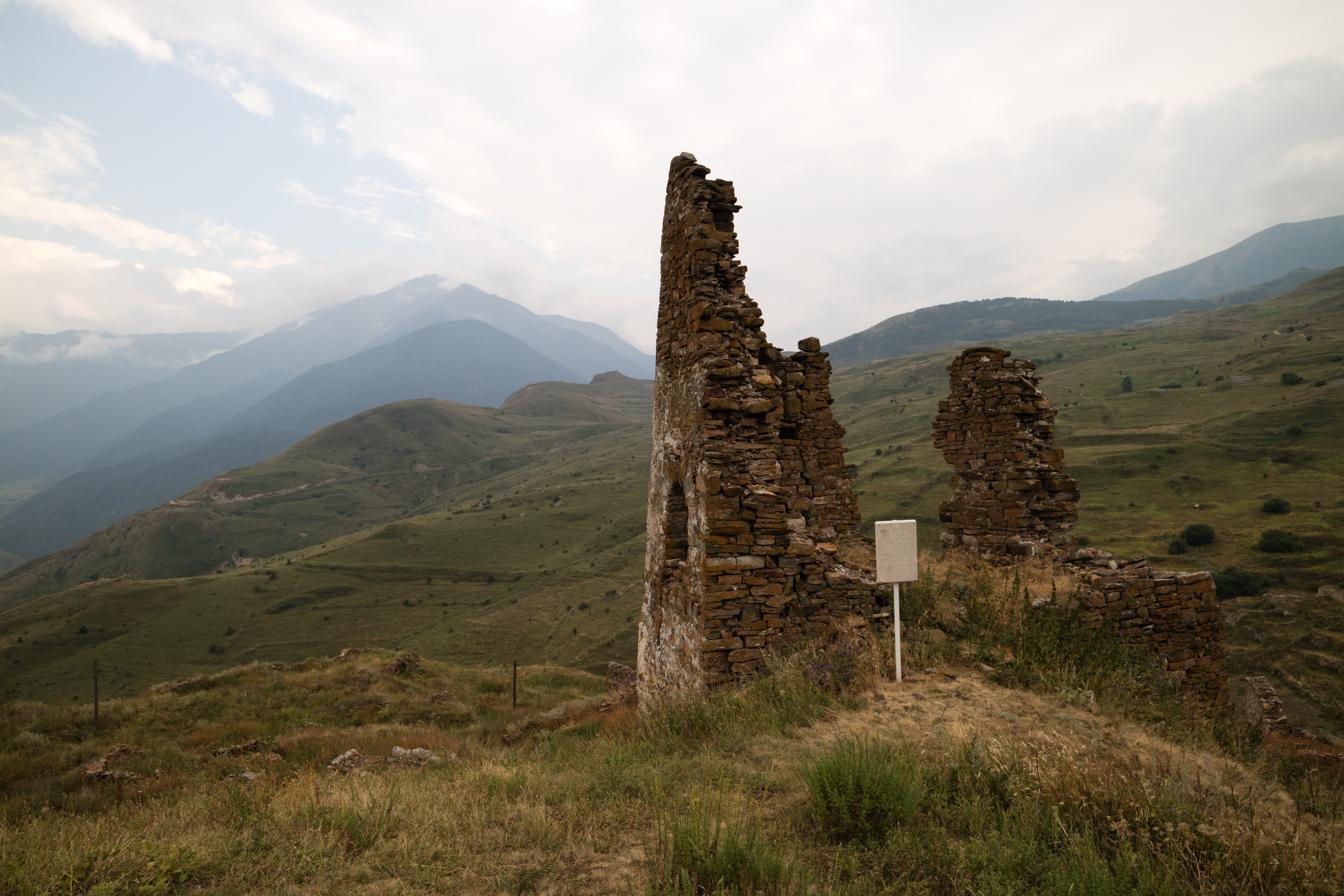
A watchtower in Donifars, that according to the legend, was built by Yese Kanukov

In western Ossetia, in the Digor Gorge, on the left bank of the Urukh River, lies the ancient village of Donifars. A dilapidated battle tower stands alone and proud on a cliff above the village, silently preserving the memory of the historical events that unfolded in these places long ago.

It was Yese Kanukov, the renowned elder of Donifars, who managed to rally his fellow villagers to repel the Kabardian prince Sari-Aslanbek (name of Aslanbech in Ossetian folklore) in the early 18th century. This tower, which offers a clear view of the main roads leading to Donifars, bears witness to those turbulent times. It was clearly an important defensive point from which signals could be transmitted to nearby mountain villages. Digor legends contain references to Yesa Kanukov, before the enemy attacked the Donifars, hiding all the villagers in one of the village towers.

Folklore sources tell of the Kabardian prince Sari-Aslanbek, who conceived the idea of subjugating the Digors, making Yese Kanukov his vassal, and his people his tributaries. He sent two black bulls to the lands of Donifars, to the Tators pasture. The plan was simple: if Yese, the leader of the Donifars community, left the bulls alone, he could be brought closer to him, and the Donifars would become his tributaries.

One morning, legend has it, Yese climbed his watchtower and saw four suns rising from the direction of Tators instead of one. He ordered several men to go to Tators and saw not four suns, but two beautiful black bulls with gilded horns. Yese realized this was a sign: someone was encroaching on their community's lands. He ordered the bulls to be brought to the village, sacrificed, and a feast held to celebrate the beginning of the haymaking season.

The Kabardian prince seized on this incident as an excuse to attack Donifars. According to legend, a large detachment of a hundred horsemen from Kabardia, Balkaria, and the plains badilat, led by Sari-Aslanbek himself, encamped in the Misigon clearing, located on the banks of the Misigon River near Donifars. From there, the prince dispatched his representatives to negotiate, instructing them to convey to Yese:

"Besides yours, there is not a single community in the mountains that does not pay me annual tribute. Now give me the tribute. I also inform you that I am coming myself with an army, whose feeding will also be your responsibility."

Yese replied to the prince:

"If he was a good guest and came with good intentions, he would send him a churek with cheese for breakfast and meat with aluton for lunch. If he did not come as a guest, Yese promised to "place him in the barn, the stable of Koziti, with the spotted pigs"

Concerned about what was happening, the residents of Donifars came to their leader. Yese reassured the people:

"Wait until tomorrow morning. Our old mountains are my witnesses. I will throw such a stone from my tower that his broad wings will ache."

That night, at the very top of the Ese Tower, the residents of Donifars lit a large bonfire, illuminating the entire area, and they danced, sang, and reveled all night long. Researchers say that "the dances held in the Kanukti Tower by the light of the fire and in full view of the enemy facilitated physical and psychological preparation before battle. In this sense, they had a distinctly magical significance."

In the morning, the Kabardian prince Aslanbech, accompanied by a servant carrying a kumgan (a narrow-necked vessel made of clay, brass, or silver; a water pitcher with a spout, handle, and lid, used primarily for washing oneself and hands), went out to perform his ablutions. Seeing this from the upper tier of the tower, Yese addressed the Donifars:

"I won't touch him for now; look at his washstand."

Taking aim, he fired at the kumgan, which was standing on the ground next to the prince, and with a well-aimed shot, shattered it. Clearly, Yese had no intention of shooting at Sari-Aslanbek: with his shot, he merely warned the enemy of the potential consequences for him and all his warriors. The prince sent a man to find out whether Yese was aiming at him or his kumgan. To this, Yese replied, "Ask your prince who is greater, he or his kumgan!"

Yese's actions dampened the prince's fighting spirit. According to one version, he turned his detachment and prepared to leave the Digor Gorge. Yese caught up with him, brought him back, and, after slaughtering the bulls, treated his recent enemy to a sumptuous feast as a sign of reconciliation. According to another, the prince changed his mind about subduing the recalcitrant warriors by force and entered Donifars as a guest, where Yese gave him a lavish reception with white bread, honey, and aluton.

===== Legacy =====
Yese was renowned in Digoria not only for his courage, wisdom, and resourcefulness, but also for his weapons. His legendary rifle, which he carried into numerous battles, never faded into oblivion. Over time, it became a Kanukov family heirloom and was passed down from generation to generation. During the Ossetian migration to Turkey in the 1860s, the muhajir settlers from Donifars took this renowned rifle with them. Fortunately, the relic wasn't lost in the foreign land. The rifle was carefully preserved as a reminder of their distant homeland. Almost a hundred years later, members of the Kanukov family living in Turkey donated the rifle to North Ossetia for safekeeping, saying, "Yese deserves to be remembered in his homeland."

A massive flintlock ramrod with a barrel of twisted Damascus steel, decorated with the finest gold and silver checkering, fired by Yese Kanukov, has been on display at the National Museum of the Republic of North Ossetia-Alania since 1964. It remains in its collection to this day.

==== Princess Daum ====
The Ossetian song "Princess Daum," which tells of the Kabardian raid on Donifars, says that when Aslanbech and his cousin Tatarkhan the Golden launched another raid on the Digors, the "tragic" outcome of this undertaking was that Alisultan was chopped into shashlik and the last descendant of the Shaugenukovs: Zhenchek was strangled with a lasso. Many other Ossetian princes were also killed.

The song goes as follows:

Balatukov's daughter, Princess Daum, had a dream.
Waking up in fear, she told her husband the dream:
- My prince, I saw a dream in my dream,
I saw things unsuitable for us:
I saw red blood on the saklya floor,
I saw a dead man who looked like you on the bed.
Dress yourself in old iron.
- Oh, don't be afraid, don't be afraid, Princess Daum!
Yesterday, my younger brother Zhanchek went after the deer;
He probably killed the deer, that's what your dream means. -
So said Alisultan, and they slept until dawn.
In the morning, waking up early, she looked out the window.
- Several horsemen are riding below;
Two in front are holding a council:
If my eyes are not mistaken,
By God, our princes are being exterminated.
- Oh, don't be afraid, don't be afraid, Princess Daum!
Kaitukov Aslanbek - sworn friend;
What will they do to me without Aslanbek's knowledge?
- I accept your illnesses, be careful!
Aslanbek with piebald eyes,
And he flatters well those he wants to kill.
- I'll wear a shirt under my armor.
What can happen through Aslanbek's mercy?
- Put on your armor
And recall all your bad deeds.
She looked through the telescope;
She recognized the horseman riding ahead.
- If my eyes do not deceive me,
Then Bekmurzin Tatarhan is riding.
- Oh, do not be afraid, do not be afraid, Princess Daum!
Cook the soup thicker, season it with onions.
Before dinner (the guests) will play chess,
And after dinner they will go home.
These cowards, having gone away, what will they do to me?
While they were reasoning like this, the guests arrived.
They chopped Alisultan into shashlik.
Weeping and sobbing, Princess Daum said:
- Black blood spilled across the saklya floor;
Flattering us, Aslanbek, the red bear, puffed himself up over us.
Red silk clothes are soaked with blood,
The Emcheks, fed on our milk, came to kill us.
Having washed her kerchief, she spread it on the stone fence,
So that they could strangle my swan neck?
Let this unfortunate day of mine become the same day
For Aslanbek's wife, the witch Chual.
Zhanchek returned with loaded game.
Aslanbek, having returned, destroyed the last descendant
of the Shaugenukovs: Zhanchek was strangled with a lasso;
Princess Daum was driven away barefoot.
Having learned of the death of Aslanbek and Zhanchek,
The Emcheks, gifted with seven horses, regretfully do not return.

=== Balkar folklore ===
Knowing that the Balkars were the most well-organized society, that they wielded significant influence over other societies, and that if they were subjugated, the others would surrender, Aslanbech first attempted to act by force against Balkaria and once penetrated it. An ancient Kabardian song and Balkar stories, passed down from generation to generation, recount this incident and the subsequent relationship between Aslanbech and his contemporary, the Balkar Prince Sosran Abaev, whom the Kabardians called "Alshagir."

One of the Aidebulovs (a princely family), dissatisfied with the Prince and seeking power, secretly communicated with Aslanbech and urged him to march with an army to Balkaria, arguing that with the help of men loyal to him, Aidebulov, they would conquer Balkaria. After lengthy discussion of this proposal, Aslanbech decided to visit Balkaria, not with an army, but with a retinue and a small guard, and to propose to Sosran Abaev, the Prince, that he voluntarily submit and pay tribute. Abaev was vigilant and, aware of Aidebulov's intentions, was always prepared to meet the enemy. Aslanbech entered the Balkar gorge and, stopping in a cave called "Zyna-Dorbun", sent ambassadors to the oliy Sosran Abaev Kuchukovich with notice of his arrival to receive tribute from the Balkars, but "Alshagir" instead of meeting him ordered the ambassadors to go to his prince and tell him that if he had business in Balkaria, he could appear at the meeting of Tyore (Balkar council), but if he intended to visit Abaev himself personally, he could come to his kunatskaya (living room); when the ambassadors attempted to object and make it clear that Aslanbech was demanding tribute, the oliy strictly forbade them to reason and ordered them to immediately leave and convey his words to Aslanbech. When the ambassadors left, he placed a chain of archers across the gorge and gave them the following orders:

"Come to me, the guests are coming, amuse them: when they come within shooting distance, fire a volley at them, but aim at the handles of their daggers and sabers, at their papakhas, it doesn’t matter if you hit the horses, but don’t kill the people; if the guests don’t stop and respond with shots, then, without retreating, let me know.”

Aslanbech, having learned of this order and convinced of the futility of his journey, returned from the gorge, despite the contrary opinion of some of his courtiers. Therefore, on the return journey, the latter composed a song in which they praised the Prince of Abaev and ridiculed Aslanbech. The song begins thus:

"Чы эймы дего Басиятыпше, Кушук-ико-Альшагир пши как жуап ирийтыргам, илик как ворогус ирийхргам," ("The Basiat prince Alshagir Kuchukovich, who lives on bad land, does not deign to answer the princes, and does not greet the nobles,")

Further in the song, Aslanbech's nobles criticize his indecisiveness and their own readiness to defect to Alshagir.

After this, Sosran Abaev and Kaitukin began to test each other in different ways. Aslanbech usually spent the summer in his hunting lodge, built in a large forest in a small clearing on the banks of the Cherek River at the exit from the Balkar Gorge. He hunted in this forest alone and allowed no one else there. In his free time, he liked to sit atop a large rock in the middle of the clearing, smoking a pipe, with a "kubgan" (washstand) standing next to him.

Abaev knew all this, and he ordered two of his renowned marksmen and hunters to test Aslanbech's courage in two ways: hide in the forest at the edge of a clearing and, just before dusk, while Kaitukin was sitting on a rock, fire simultaneously, one bullet hitting his pipe and the other his kubgan. If he wasn't frightened, they would remain in the forest when Aslanbech went hunting, but in such a way that he wouldn't see them until the beast leaped out. The hunters carried out this order precisely, for which he himself later gifted them a plot of land, which the descendants of the Attasauva hunters still own.

Aslanbech's bravery was so great that he continued to sit perfectly still while bullets knocked the pipe from his mouth and knocked over the kubgan. In the forest, when the frightened deer jumped out, three shots rang out simultaneously, and all three bullets hit him, and he fell, and at the same time, Kaitukin and two Balkarian hunters ran up to him. Aslanbech, enraged by the highlanders' audacity, raised his rifle and aimed at them, at which moment they too pointed their guns at Aslanbech's chest. Then Aslanbech came to his senses, lowered his rifle, and returned home, while the hunters took the deer and also set off for Balkaria and reported what had happened to Sosran. After these pranks, he decided to punish Alshagir by driving away his sheep along with the shepherds, who were far from the Balkar society, behind two mountain ranges, to the Khizni-bashi pasture, which can be reached through a special gorge.

Having set out with his men, he hesitated to attack the kosh immediately due to the overwhelming number of armed men. He left his men, hiding them in the forest, and dressed himself in the garb of a simple Kabardian. He walked to Sosran's kosh on foot, like a hunter, for the night. He was received, and the elders ordered a lamb to be slaughtered for the guest, who pretended not to speak Balkarian.

The conversation turned to the topic of the day, that is, to Kaitukin and Abaev. Some said Aslanbech would win, while others said that as long as Sosran lived, Aslanbech would not succeed in conquering Balkaria. Then a young man from Sosran's "atalyks" intervened and, having first asked permission from his elders, said this: "I think that Aslanbech, while perhaps brave, is not a smart man. If he were smart, instead of engaging in combat with Sosran, he would seek his friendship and, having formed an alliance with him, would quietly, together with the young Balkarian taubii, conquer all the neighbors and receive tribute from them." These words gave Aslanbech pause for thought. After supper, the elders went to bed in the kosh, and the young people with the dogs went to the fires lit around the sheep encampment at some distance from each other. But soon Kaitukin heard isolated shots ringing out nearby at short intervals. He stood up, left the tent, and saw the following scene: the young people near the fires, instead of sleeping, were practicing target shooting. They were setting ribs and other bones from a eaten lamb at one fire, and those at the other fire were shooting at these bones, hitting them, and this exercise continued until morning.

Aslanbech realized that these shepherd-shooters would not be easily captured and would not give up the ram cheaply, so he did not dare to carry out his intention and went home, but nevertheless, being proud and spoiled by success, he decided, before seeking Sosran's friendship, to study the internal order of the government of Balkaria, its means and forces and for this he sent two of his faithful and intelligent confidants, of Kumyk origin, who spoke the Balkarian language, to Balkaria so that they would come to the house of Sosran Abaev as wanderers and, having lived there for a year, study the life and customs of the Balkars and Sosran himself.

But when these ambassadors returned a year later, they told him that the entire population obeyed Sosran unquestioningly, he himself had significant resources, had relations with Georgia, Imereti, everything that was not in Balkaria, he received from there, had a trained army from the youth, they made gunpowder themselves, they mined lead locally, Sosran himself was a cultured man, he had high Towers with embrasures built of lime, underground water pipes to his estate, and an orchard planted.

Hearing all this and the ambassadors' opinion of the futility of fighting Sosran, Aslanbech initiated peace negotiations with him, and they concluded an alliance. Kaitukin granted Sosran the right to drive the Balkar community's herds free of charge to Kabardian lands for grazing in the fall and spring, and to set up a "basiat-kosh" (camp) wherever the taubii wished, up to the banks of the Terek River. Sosran, in turn, pledged not to hinder Aslanbech's occasional forays into the neighboring communities of Bezengi and Khulam for profit and to steal bulls and rams for slaughter.

But Sosran was cautious, apparently knowing that in international treaties, right is reserved only for the strong. Therefore, during periods when the cattle were on the plains, he sent a detachment of young taubii with bridlers and riflemen, who would set up camp below the kosh farmsteads to prevent any malicious intent on the part of Aslanbech and the Kabardians in general. At the same time, this detachment would travel to Chechnya, Ossetia, and other places in search of profit, often carrying off young men and women who were enslaved. The taubii camps were called "basiat-kosh," where young men from neighboring friendly tribes and other mountain communities often came to learn the art of war. This order existed until the arrival of Russian troops and the annexation of Kabardia and Balkaria to Russian Empire.
