= Jemboyluk =

Historical region in Ukraine

Jemboyluk (Nogai: Emboylk, Crimean Tatar: Cemboylıq) is a historical region located in the south of Ukraine, between the lower reaches of Dnieper and the Crimean Peninsula, which corresponds to the modern day Kherson and Zaporizhzhia oblasts (regions).

== History ==
In 1644, the Jemboyluk and Yedisan Nogais supported the Kalmyk khan Kho Orluk during his war against the Kabardians in 1644. The Nogais made up a significant portion of the Kalmyk Khan's forces.

In the 18th century, the territories of southern Ukraine was inhabited by the Nogai horde of Jemboyluk (also called Yimbuluk), which gave the region its name. Another name for the horde was the Perekop Horde. At the beginning of the 17th century, this Nogai horde roamed in the steppes of present-day western Kazakhstan along the Emba River (hence the Nogai name Jemboyluk: "Jem/Yem" — Emba, "boy" — bank, "-luk" — a collective suffix), but like other Nogais, it was forced —under the pressure of the Kalmyk invasion of Kho Orluk— to migrate to the Volga in 1628, and to Kuban in 1715.

In the first half of the 18th century, Bakhti Giray aimed to repopulate the Kuban region, which was devastated by Russo-Kabardian-Kalmyk forces in 1711. To achieve this, he attempted the forced resettlement of Nogais from Kalmyk and Russian territories, which led to a series of clashes between Crimean Tatars and Kalmyks beginning in 1713. In early 1715, he raided Kalmyk nomadic camps near Astrakhan, killing about 3,000 people, plundering the area, and transferring many Nogais to Kuban. As a result, Bakhti Giray’s ulus in Kuban increased by more than 60,000 people. At the same time, the aging Kalmyk Khan Ayuka struggled to maintain control over Kalmykia. Bakhti Giray's position, however, remained precarious. In 1716, parts of the Yedisan and Jemboyluk Nogais were captured by the Kabardians and handed over to the Kalmyks.

Subsequently, like the Yedisan Horde, the Jemboyluk Horde in 1728 found refuge in the territory of modern southern Ukraine under the protection of the Crimean khans. To the north of the Jemboyluk nomadic areas was the Edishkul Horde. After the incorporation of Jemboyluk into Russia in 1770, in 1771 the Nogais resettled to the North Caucasus (north of Mozdok), and the region became part of Novorossiya.

In 1783, the Tsar began an operation to resettle the Nogais from Kuban to steppes in the north, such as Tambov, Saratov and regions of Ural. At first the Nogais submitted, however, the Jemboyluks, on August first, began an armed resistance against the resettlement operation, however they were soon driven to the river and lost with heavy casualities.
