= Battle of Zhyryshty =

1731 battle in the Northern Caucasus

- Part of Crimean–Circassian wars
Date	October 1731
Location	Zhyryshty Crossing
Result	Circassian victory: The battle ended large-scale Crimean incursions into Kabarda

Belligerents
Kabardia (East Circassia)	Crimean Khanate

Commanders and leaders
Yislambech Misost	(Crimean Khanate) Aslan-Giray

Strength
~12,000	~7,000

Casualties and losses
Unknown	Heavy losses

The Battle of Zhyryshty Crossing was fought in October 1731 between the forces of Grand Kabarda and the Crimean Khanate. It was part of the larger Crimean-Circassian Wars, where the Crimean Khanate attempted to subjugate the independent Kabardian principalities. The battle resulted in a decisive Kabardian victory, forcing the Crimean forces to retreat across the Terek River.

== Background ==
During the early 18th century, the Crimean Khanate launched multiple campaigns against Grand Kabarda, attempting to weaken its independence. Previous Crimean incursions in 1708, 1711, and 1721 had ended in defeats. In 1731, Aslan-Giray, a Crimean commander, led an army of approximately 7,000 warriors from Crimea, the Kuban region, and Nogai tribes to retaliate against Kabarda. Their objective was to devastate Kabardian settlements, seize livestock, and assert military dominance in the region.

== Battle ==
After initial skirmishes, the Crimean forces attempted to cross the Terek River at Zhyryshty. Kabardian forces, numbering around 12,000 men, waited for the enemy to begin their river crossing. Once the Crimean forces were vulnerable in mid-crossing, the Kabardians launched a sudden attack, overwhelming the enemy. The Crimean forces suffered heavy casualties, with many drowning in the river or being cut down by Kabardian cavalry.

== Aftermath ==
The battle marked a major strategic defeat for the Crimean Khanate. It significantly reduced Crimean influence in the North Caucasus and prevented future large-scale invasions into Kabardian lands. Although minor raids continued, Kabarda maintained its de facto independence from Crimean control.

== Bibliography ==
- Aloev, T.Kh. (2018). "Battle at the Zhyryshty Crossing: The Kabardian-Crimean Campaign of 1731". Vestnik KBIGI. 4 (39): 27–44. doi:10.31007/2306-5826-2018-4-39-27-44.
- Malbakhov, B.K. (1999). Взаимоотношения Кабарды с Россией: От военно-политического союза к установлению российской администрации, середина XVI — первая четверть XIX в. Владикавказ.
