= Kabardian Invasion of Chechnya (1720) =

Campaign of Aslanbech Qeytuqo against the Chechen peoples in 1720

- Part of Circassian-Vainakh wars
Date	Late august, 1720
Location	Vainakhia, Terek and Sunzha regions (modern day Chechnya)
Result	Circassian–Cossack victory
Territorial changes	Destruction of several Chechen settlements

Belligerents
Kabardia (East Circassia); Don Cossacks	Chechen clans

Commanders and leaders
Aslanbech Qeytuqo; Tatarkhan Bechmirza; Batoqo Bechmirza	Local Chechen elders

Strength
Several hundred Kabardian cavalry and Cossack auxiliaries	Unknown

Casualties and losses
Unknown	Very Heavy, many women and children captured

The Circassian Campaign against the Chechens was a military expedition led by the Kabardian prince Aslanbek Qeytuqo in the summer of 1720 by a coalition of Kabardian forces and Don Cossacks against the Chechens clans on lower Sunzha, aiming to suppress the Anti-Russian hostility between the Chechens, Which resulted in the destruction of many Chechen settlements but eventual Kabardian retreat because of low supplies.

== Background ==
The Kabardino-Russian friendship goes way back to the 16th century, when the Kabardian prince Temruqo Idar established an alliance with the Russian Tsar Ivan the Terrible.

Temruqo explored the possible allies, and settled his choice on the Tsarist Russia. In 1557, Temruqo settled on to Moscow to seek alliance with the Russians. The delegation included his sons Sultan Qul and Bulat Gery, who were welcomed by Ivan the Terrible. Ivan agreed to join the alliance with Kabardia.

In 1560, Anastasia Romanovna, Ivan's first wife, died. It was proposed that Ivan would marry Catherine Jagiellon in order to strengthen diplomatic relations with Poland. However Ivan instead decided to marry Temruqo's daughter, Gushaney. high-level delegation was sent to betroth Gwashanay. She was accompanied by her brother, Sultan Qul, on her way to Moscow. Gwashanay was later baptized and became known as Maria Temruqoovna. Her brother married the daughter of a member of the tsar's entourage who handled the state treasury. He was later baptized and became known as Mikhael.

This campaign of Aslanbek Qeytuqo wasn't the first conflict between Kabardians and Nakh peoples, in 1596, the Kabardian princes Sholokh Tepsaruqo of Talostaney and Aytech invaded the Daryal Gorge and expelled the Vainakhs from the region, taking control over the lands of Sultan-Murza, a Vainkah noble in the Central Caucasus who controlled the Darial Gorge.

== History ==
=== Campaign ===
In 1720, when several Kabardian princes appealed to Peter I of Russia for support against their regional opponents. In their letter the Kabardian nobles reported that, together with detachments of the Don Cossacks, they had carried out a punitive campaign against nearby Chechen settlements. According to the document, Kabardian and Cossack forces attacked several Chechen communities, inflicted notable casualties, seized property, and took a number of women and children captive.

Shortly after this campaign, Kabardia itself came under pressure from the Crimean Khanate. The Kabardian princes reported that forces of the Crimean khan, supported by Kuban Tatars and several Circassian groups that had broken away from Kabardia, conducted an incursion that devastated local supplies. This situation prompted the Kabardian leadership to request military assistance from Russia and to propose the construction of a Russian fortress in their territory.

The campaign inflicted heavy losses on the targeted clans and demonstrated Kabardia's loyalty to Russia, but the forces soon withdrew to their homeland without establishing permanent control over the area because of low supplies In August 1720, Aslanbech Qeytuqo and other Kabardian princes wrote to Peter I about their raids against the Chechens and asked him to build a town in their land:

"We hereby report to Your Royal Majesty that some peoples, called Chechens, who are your enemies, sovereign, and we, uniting with the Don Cossacks, attacked them, destroyed them and killed many. Their wives and children were taken captive, and their belongings and baggage were seized by the Don Cossacks. We hold so many of the captured captives in our custody to this day, and we pray to the Lord God that Your Royal Majesty may always achieve such victories over your enemies. From that captive supply, as a guarantee, we have sent to you, Your Royal Majesty, one boy and one girl, and every year we serve Your Royal Majesty without sparing our lives."

== Aftermath ==
After this campaign, Shamkhal Tarkov, the Aksay and Endirey rulers, who themselves claimed the Chechens as their subjects, reacted harshly. They appealed to the Crimean Khan. Upon learning of this, the Kabardian princes appealed to Russia for help in repelling the Crimean Khan's attack and for the construction of a fortress in the Beshtamak area, near the Terek, to protect Kabardia
