= Kalmyk Invasion of Kabardia (1644) =

Kalmyk campaign against Kabardia in 1644

Kalmyk Campaign against Kabardia (1644)
- Part of Kalmyk–Kabardian Wars
Date	January 1644
Location	Kabardia
Result	Circassian–Nogai–Abazin victory
Territorial changes	Invasion repelled, retreat of the Kalmyk army from Kabardia

Belligerents
Greater Kabardia; Lesser Nogai Horde; Abazins; Foreign volunteers: Svans; Karachay-Balkars	Kalmyk Khanate; Great Nogai Horde; Yedisan Nogais; Jemboyluks

Commanders and leaders
Alejuqo Shojenuqo; Hatokhshoqo Qaziy; Karashaim	Kho Orluk †; Girestan †; Irgeten †; Zhelden †; Choktu †; Arkhuli †; Kaltu †; Yelden †; Serene †; Tugul †; Sarambay †; Ilgerdei (POW); Unknown commander (POW)

Strength
10,000; 2,000	11,500–20,500 (Russian sources) 100,000 (Ottoman sources)

Casualties and losses
Heavy	9,500–19,000 (Russian sources) (Note: Only 1,500–2,000 survived from the Kalmyk army of 11,500–20,500): 1,000 captured; 20,000 killed 20,000 captured (Ottoman sources)

The Kalmyk Invasion of Kabardia (1644) was a mid-17th-century conflict in the North Caucasus between Kalmyk forces and the Kabardians supported by Nogais and many other Caucasian peoples. The campaign resulted in a decisive Kabardian victory, ending with heavy losses among the Kalmyks and the death of many of their leaders and commanders.

The conflict is considered as an important part of the Caucasian and Circassian history for illustrating the shifting political balance between the nomadic groups and Circassian polities during this period.

== Background ==
The Kalmyks first appeared in the North Caucasiansteppes in the 17th century. but their main nomadic camps were located at that time east of the Volga River, and they did not conduct any military operations against the highlanders of the North Caucasus. They needed to settle into their new surroundings and claim their lands, primarily from the Nogai, who were equally skilled in steppe warfare. A portion of the Great Horde Nogais, who had migrated from the Volga to the Terek, also feuded with the Kalmyk feudal lords.

The first documented meeting between Kabardians and Kalmyks occurred in early 1632 in Moscow. on January 25, the Kabardian princes Kelemet Kudenetovich, Buruk and Tonzhechan Araslanov, Kanshov Bitemryukov, and the Kalmyk ambassadors Taigush, Ugurly, Taizi, and Shoni bowed to the Tsar of Russia

In autumn of 1643 Kalmyks under Lausan taisha and Sarzhin taisha and Yedisan Nogais under Syayunch murza fought with the uluses of the Nogai murza Karashaim. After this attack, having lost most of his ulus people, he migrated to the upper reaches of the Kuban, where at that time the villages of his father-in-law, the Kabardian prince Aledjuqo Shodjenuqo, were located. Evliya Çelebi writes name of this Murza as Arslanbek instead of Karashaim

Military confrontation began to escalate at the end of 1643, when a Kalmyk detachment of many thousands, joined by a portion of the Nogai of the Great Horde from the tribes of Yedisan and Dzhemboyluk, under the leadership of Taisha Urlyuk, marched to the North Caucasus from beyond the Volga. In the steppes of the North Caucasus, the warriors split up. One part, led by Taisha Erke, headed toward the Terki Fortress, located at that time at the mouth of the Terek River. The other, under the leadership of Urlyuk-taisha, headed for the Kuban River

On January 4, 1644, Taisha Erke led his warriors to storm the Terek city. The first clashes erupted in the so-called riverside settlements, inhabited primarily by "Cherkasy," "Okochans", and "Tatars"—that is, highlanders in the military service of the Russian tsar and subordinate to the Terek voivodes. Events unfolded somewhat differently in the Northwestern Caucasus, where Taisha Urlyuk's main forces, numbering between ten and a half and twelve and a half thousand men according to Russian sources and one hundred thousand according to Ottoman sources,ely tied to the Nogai social elite through "interdynastic" marriages and, consequently, military and political alliances. As a result, while pursuing the retreating Nogai detachments, the Kalmyks began to clash with other peoples of the North Caucasus. Moreover, without the burden of a burdensome supply train, which could have reduced their maneuverability, the Kalmyk detachments were simply forced to "feed" at the expense of the local population. Thus, a clash with the highlanders became inevitable.

== Invasion ==
In early 1644, after a skirmish with the Kalmyks, the Besleneys informed the Kabardians and Nogais of the Kalmyk army's advance toward them. Upon receiving news of the Kalmyks' approach, the combined forces of the Kabardian princes, Nogai murzas, and some of the Abaza began to fortify their settlements and prepare for defense. According to Evliya Çelebi and Mustafa Naima the coalition army numbered ten thousand

Around mid-January 1644, Kalmyk detachments stormed the allies' fortified positions. The battle began to take on a fierce character. The brutal Kalmyk attack was initially successful with the coalition suffering heavy casualties. As Evliya Çelebi notes; As soon as the Kalmyk warriors saw the Circassians and Nogai—a small group—they made a sudden attack with cries of "Ho!", and the Nogai together with the Kabardians turned to flight. Seeing this, the Kalmyks began to pursue them and went deep into the mountains where a second battle took place.

Begeulov R.M, based on the report of Italian Catholic missionary A. Lamberti who claims Svans and Karachays participated and defeated an invasion by "unknown people" between 1630 and 1650 and Circassian oral tradition that claims 2,000 people gathered from various mountain tribes helped them during a battle, suggests that Karachays, Balkars and Svans helped the coalition during this second battle.

When the Kalmyks arrived into the mountain, the allied marksmen with rifles, hidden in ambush, like a "seven-headed dragon" as noted bu Evliya Çelebi, jumped out of ambush and struck the Kalmyks with volleys lead. Instantly, the kalmyk army was destroyed and according to a Russian document from 1644, the Kalmyks lost almost all of their leaders, the elite "command staff," in this battle and suffered heavy losses. Evliya Çelebi claims that in this battle 20,000 Kalmyks were killed and another 20,000 was captured while over 67 thousand horses was seized by the victors Russian sources on the other hand report that of the kalmyk army, only 1,500 or 2,000 survived.

The Terek voivode M. Volynsky wrote to the Ambassadorial Prikaz;

"The Kabardian and Nogai murzas, with their warriors, defeated the Kalmyk people. And they killed, sir, the Kalmyk people's chieftains, Urlyuk-taisu, and his children, Gireisan-taisu, Irgenten-taisu, and Zhelden-taisu, and captured two Taisas alive – Ilgerdei-taisu, and he doesn't remember his other name – and with them, more than a thousand Kalmyk and Etisan people were captured. And there were, they say, with those tais of Kalmyk people and Etisan and Yanbuilut murzas and their ulus military people 10,500 people, and they left, sir, from that battle from the Cherkass and from Malovo Nogai about one and a half or two thousand separately on foot, and the Kabardian and Malovo Nogai ulus people took away all their horses and animals"
