= Yislambech of Kabardia =

Grand Prince of Kabardia between 1721 and 1732

Yislambech Misost

Grand Prince of Kabardia
- Reign: 1721 – 1732
- Predecessor: Hatokhshoqo Misost
- Successor: Tatarkhan the Golden
- Born: c. 1660s Kabardia
- Died: 1732; Kabardia
- Issue: Sons: Yismel; Kartul; Mukul-Aliy; Navruz; Daughters: An unnamed daughter
Names
- Yislambech, son of Misost
- Kabardian: Мысост и къуэ Ислъамбэч
- House: Inalid dynasty; House of Misost
- Father: Misost Qaziy

Yislambech Misost, (Note: Kabardian: Мысост Ислъамбэч Russian: Исламбек Мисостов) also called Yislam Misost (Note: Kabardian: Мысост Ислъам Russian: Ислам Мисостов) was a Kabardian prince and leading figure of the Kabardian nobility in the early 18th century. He played a significant role in the internal political struggles of Kabardia during a period marked by competing influences from the Crimean Khanate and the Russian Empire. Throughout his career, he was associated with shifting alliances, at times aligning with Crimean-backed factions and at other times engaging in cooperation with Russian authorities.

Yislambech was involved in a series of conflicts and power struggles between 1720 and 1729, including disputes over the position of supreme prince in Kabarda and military engagements against rival Kabardian groups. His actions contributed to prolonged instability in the region and ongoing external intervention by neighboring powers.

== Biography ==
=== Early life ===
In the early 18th century, Kabardian princes maintained diplomatic and military relations with the Russian state during the reign of Peter the Great. A letter addressed to the tsar, dated between 1715 and 1717, identified several leading figures who exercised authority within Kabardian society at different times, including Yislambech Misost and Hatokhshoqo Misost, Aslanbech Qeytuqo, Tatarkhan Bechmirza, and Bemat Kurghoqo.

In September 1712, Kabardian princes sent a formal message to the Russian court in which they referred to compensation for their military service, particularly in connection with the Kuban campaign led by Pyotr Matveyevich Apraksin. The letter also included a request for Russian military support to ensure the protection of their territories and settlements.

Contemporary Russian official Fyodor Apraksin reported that on 30 August 1711, Circassian forces engaged Kuban troops under the command of Nuradin-Sultan. According to his account, the Circassians inflicted significant losses, killing 359 opponents, capturing 40 prisoners, and forcing others into the Kuban River. The opposing commander reportedly retreated with only a small number of men, while a considerable number of horses were seized by the Circassian forces. Yislambech Misost's inclusion among those claiming payment suggests he participated in the Kuban campaign.

On March 20, 1718, Peter I addressed his letter to the princes of Greater Kabardia, Hatokhshoqo and Yislambech Misost, Aslanbech Qeytuqo, Tatarkhan Bechmirza and others, in which he announced:

"...we have now sent to you: for this service of our royal majesty, a salary of sables and other soft fur with our seal"

=== Civil strife in Kabardia ===
The expulsion of Bakhty Giray from Kabardia and the subsequent Trans-Kuban campaign significantly worsened relations between the Kabardians and the Crimean Khanate. After coming to power in Bakhchisarai, Saadat IV Giray advanced with a force of approximately 40,000 troops to the Kabardian frontier and issued an ultimatum. He demanded that the Kabardians recognize Ottoman suzerainty, resume tribute payments to Crimea in the form of 4,000 yasyrs as compensation for the defeat of Kaplan Giray, and repay losses incurred by the Tatars during conflicts over the previous two decades.

During deliberations, the Misost faction and their allies proposed accepting these terms. Envoys were dispatched to Crimea offering 1,000 yasyrs as partial compensation, while warning that no tribute would be given if the khan resorted to military action. In response, the khan ordered the execution of the envoys and advanced his forces across the Kuban River.

These events led to a division within the Kabardian assembly (khasa) into two factions: one aligned with the Crimean-Ottoman side, including the Hatokhshoqo and Misost dynasties, led by Yislambech Misost, Bemat Kurghoqo, and others. Their faction was referred to as the "Bakhsan Party". On the other side, there was the "Kashkatau Party" including Qeytuqo and Bechmirza dynasties, led by Aslanbech Qeytuqo.

In the spring of 1720, Saadat Giray led a Crimean Tatar force into Kabarda, devastating and plundering several settlements while demanding compliance with his ultimatum. With his support, Yislambech Misost, leader of the pro-Ottoman Kabardian nobility, was proclaimed Grand Prince of Kabardia in 1721.

At the same time, Salikh-Girey, the Khan's son who had been raised in the Misost household, took part in a plot to assassinate Aslanbech Qeytuqo. The conspiracy was uncovered, and on 20 May 1720, the Qeytuqo and Bechmirza factions—collectively known as the Jambulat clan—retreated to the Kashkatau area, where they established a fortified settlement known in documents as the Cherek town.

Saadat Giray avoided further incursion into Kabardia due to a plague outbreak and withdrew to Crimea. Meanwhile, the Kashkatau faction, confined in the Cherek valley, appealed for Russian support. Yislambech Misost, relying on Crimean backing, attempted to blockade the settlement and cut off supply routes.

In spring 1721, Moscow dispatched Don Cossack forces in support of the Kashkatau party, which, together with Aslanbech's forces, defeated the Baksan faction on Nogai territory. On 16 May 1721, the Military Collegium raised the Kabardian issue before the Senate, seeking to determine whether aid could be provided without provoking conflict with the Ottoman Empire.

Later that year, Astrakhan Governor A. P. Volynsky arrived in the Greben region with Cossack and Kalmyk detachments. He attempted to reconcile the warring Kabardian factions, secure oaths of loyalty, and obtain hostages. Yislambech Misost was taken into custody. In April 1722, Yislambech Misost sent a letter to the Russian Emperor pledging allegiance and offering his son and nephew as hostages. However, after his release, he resumed his alliance with the Crimean Khanate. He later reaffirmed his allegiance to Crimea and strengthened ties through marriage alliances, including the marriage of his daughter to Salih-Girey, then Kuban serasker.

Subsequently, Yislambech, Salih-Girey, Bemat Kurghoqo, and other leaders raised a joint force and attacked territories held by the Kashkatau faction. On 9 March 1723, the Collegium of Foreign Affairs reviewed Misostov's case after reports confirmed his violation of oaths and collaboration with Crimean forces. Letters sent by Kashkatau leaders to Astrakhan Governor Ivan Kikin described ongoing sieges and requested Russian military assistance. Orders were issued for support from Kalmyk Khan Ayuka and the Don Cossacks, and diplomatic correspondence was sent to the Russian court. Despite these measures, relief was limited, and the Cherek settlement remained under siege.

Following a change in Crimean leadership under Devlet Giray II, Aslanbech Qeytuqo sought rapprochement with Bakhchisarai. A political realignment followed, and alliances were reinforced through marriage between Qeytuqey family and the Crimean ruling house. The new khan appointed Bakhty-Girey as serasker in Kuban, who in turn negotiated an agreement with Aslanbech for the seizure of supreme authority in Kabarda and its incorporation under Ottoman influence.

These plans were ultimately disrupted. The Kabardian statesman Jabagh Qazanoqo played a key diplomatic role in maintaining peace and restoring relations with Russia. Under his influence, Yislambech Misost convened a khasa (council), which resolved to send an embassy to Peter the Great. The emperor received the delegation, relations were restored, and military assistance was again promised.

Following the death of Peter I on 28 January 1725, Russian influence in Kabardia weakened. In 1729, Bakhty-Girey demanded renewed tribute in the form of yasyr (captives). He was later killed in a skirmish, after which Kabardian sources state that the annual obligation to provide captives to the Crimean Khan was effectively ended.

E. J. Naloeva provides a more detailed account of the death of Bakhty-Girey and his brother Shabaz-Girey. According to her, in the spring of 1729, the forces of Deli-Sultan advanced toward the borders of Kabarda. During a fierce battle, Yislambech Misost struck Bakhty-Girey down with a saber. Naloeva further notes that this event had long-term consequences for Kabarda, stating that revenge "for the blood of two sultans" thereafter hung over the Kabardians like a prolonged threat, continuing for more than twenty years.

=== Death ===
Little remains to be added regarding Yislambech Misost. He died in 1732 at the age of over sixty. His eldest son, Nauruz, later became the founder of the Nauruz princely family, continuing his lineage within the Kabardian nobility.

== Sources ==
- Kardanov, Ch. E. (2016). Князья Кабарды [Princes of Kabarda] (in Russian). Nalchik: Izdatel'stvo M. i V. Kotlyarovykh. ISBN 978-5-93680-971-2.
