= Battle of Laba River (1739) =

Battle of the Russo-Turkish War of 1735–39

- Part of the Kuban campaigns (1736–1739)
Date	August 20, 1739
Location	Laba River, North Caucasus
Result	Circassian-Kalmyk victory

Belligerents
Crimean Khanate	Kabardia; Kalmyk Khanate

Commanders and leaders
Kazi-Girey †	Aslanbech Qeytuqo; Donduk-Ombo

Strength
Unknown	Unknown

Casualties and losses
Heavy	Unknown

The Battle of Laba River was a military engagement that took place on August 20, 1739, during the final phase of the Russo-Turkish War (1735–1739).

== History ==
In the summer of 1739, as Russian forces were making significant gains in Moldavia, the Ottoman Empire encouraged a retaliatory raid by the western Circassians under Feti-Girey and the Kuban-based sarkir Kazi-Girey. They, along with the Chemguy Circassians, attacked Kabardian summer pastures, capturing 500 people and seizing about 200,000 sheep and 7,000 cattle.

However, shortly after the Ottoman defeat at the Battle of Stavuchany on August 17, the Kabardian and Kalmyk forces mounted a counterattack. On August 20, they confronted Kazi-Girey's forces near the Laba River. In the ensuing battle, the Crimean-led forces were defeated; many were killed or captured, and Kazi-Girey himself was mortally wounded.

== Sources ==
- Aksan, Virginia H. (2007). Ottoman Wars, 1700-1870: An Empire Besieged. London & New York: Routledge.
