= Bakhti Giray =

Crimean Tatar commander (died 1729)

- Nickname: "Deli Sultan"
- Born: Unknown; Crimean Khanate
- Died: 1729 Baksan, Kabardia
- Buried: Bakhchisaray
- Allegiance: Crimean Khanate
- Children: Devlet Giray; Sahib Giray; Selim Giray; Saadet Giray; Ghazi Giray

Bakhti Giray (d. 1729), also known as Deli Sultan, was a Crimean Tatar prince of the Giray dynasty and a son of Devlet II Giray, Khan of Crimea. Active mainly in the Kuban and North Caucasus, he emerged in the early 18th century as a semi-independent warlord, repeatedly rebelling against the Crimean khans and the Ottoman authorities. His career was marked by large-scale raids, shifting alliances with Nogais, Kalmyks, Circassians, and Cossacks, and prolonged warfare in the Kuban, Kabardia, and southern Russian frontier. He was killed in 1729 by Kabardians.

== Biography ==
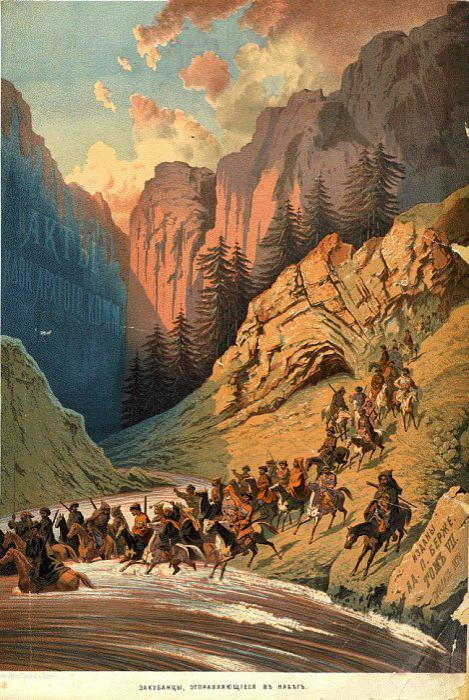
"The Kubans going on a raid." Documents collected by the Caucasian Archaeographic Commission. - Tiflis, 1876, vol. 7

Bakhti Giray was the eldest son of the Crimean khan Devlet II Giray. He is mentioned in most major studies on the history of the 18th-century Crimean Khanate and is often characterized as a rebel whose activities created persistent difficulties for his overlords. The earliest evidence of his activity dates to June 1, 1700, when he held the position of Viceroy of Kuban. Nothing is known about his early life, origin, or date of birth.

In the autumn of 1700, Qaplan I Giray was present in Kuban, ruling—according to the testimony of Bakhti Giray’s followers—over the Yedisan Nogais, who at that time lived in the upper reaches of the Kuban River. Unable to obtain the offices of kalga or nureddin, which were occupied by his father’s uncles and brothers, Bakhti Giray contented himself with the post of viceroy of Kuban. The subsequent years of his life, up to the events of 1709, remain undocumented.

After the defeat of Qaplan Giray at the Battle of Kanzhal in 1708, Bakhti Giray’s father Devlet II Giray was reappointed as khan. Upon ascending the throne, Devlet appointed Bakhti as nureddin; according to the Crimean Tatar historian Halim Giray, Bakhti Giray soon afterward became kalga. In 1710, a new war broke out between the Russian Empire and the Ottoman Empire. During the winter of 1711, Devlet Giray and Bakhti Giray invaded Russian territories, killing and enslaving many people. The campaign, however, proved unsuccessful: Russian border fortresses resisted the attacks, and the Nogais and Crimean Tatars limited themselves to the customary plunder and devastation of Right-Bank Ukraine. The forces of Bakhti Giray, which were marching to join Devlet Giray, were delayed by the Kalmyk khan Ayuka, forcing Devlet Giray—who had reached Kharkov—to turn back and avoid a direct confrontation with the Russians.

In retaliation for this invasion, the Astrakhan governor P. M. Apraksin, together with his Kalmyk allies, launched the invasion of Kuban with a force of 34,362 men. The Russo–Kalmyk army inflicted a severe defeat on the Kuban Tatars. The Kabardians rendered significant assistance to the Russian forces, defeating detachments led by Bakhti Giray, killing 359 of his men and capturing 40 others, and preventing other Nogai groups in the upper Kuban from joining him. Bakhti Giray later led the combined forces of the Kuban Nogais but suffered a crushing defeat at the Sal River. The Kuban Nogais were devastated: about 16,000 were killed and 22,000 captured. Kalmyk war booty reportedly included 2,000 camels, 40,000 horses, and nearly 200,000 head of cattle. The destruction of the Kuban region prompted Bakhti Giray to initiate an independence movement and proclaim himself the Sultan of Kuban.

This action earned Bakhti Giray the epithet "Deli Sultan". He primarily sought to subjugate the Kuban Nogais and plundered the uluses of Kuban murzas who had declared loyalty to Qaplan I Giray. He began the extermination of the nobility of the Kasai and Kaspulat uluses and was supported by the Nogai clans of Orak-oğlu, led by the murzas Arslan Bey, Yusuf Murza, and Sumakh Murza.

Bakhti Giray next aimed to repopulate the devastated Kuban region. To achieve this, he attempted the forced resettlement of Nogais from Kalmyk and Russian territories, which led to a series of clashes between Tatars and Kalmyks beginning in 1713. In early 1715, he raided Kalmyk nomadic camps near Astrakhan, killing about 3,000 people, plundering the area, and transferring many Nogais to Kuban. As a result, Bakhti Giray’s ulus in Kuban increased by more than 60,000 people. At the same time, the aging Kalmyk Khan Ayuka struggled to maintain control over Kalmykia. Bakhti Giray’s position, however, remained precarious. In 1716, parts of the Yedisan and Jemboyluk Nogais were captured by the Kabardians and handed over to the Kalmyks. Concurrently, the Crimean kalga Mengli Giray Sultan, supported by the Chinese-Kipchak murzas, moved against Bakhti Giray.

Concerned by his nephew’s growing ambitions, Qaplan I Giray was likely involved in organizing the armed uprising of the Chinese-Kipchaks. During these clashes, the kalga succeeded in transferring some of the Yedisans and Dzhemboyluks to the Crimean Peninsula. This development prompted Bakhti Giray to conclude an agreement with Ayuka Khan, promising to return the Yedisans and Dzhemboyluks in exchange for Kalmyk assistance against the Chinese-Kipchaks. In early 1717, Ayuka’s son Chakdorjap marched into Kuban, defeated the Chinese-Kipchak uluses, and, in accordance with the agreement, withdrew the Yedisans and Dzhemboyluks from Kuban, leaving Bakhti Giray with 170 Kalmyks to assist him.

The most powerful raid carried out by Bakhti Giray’s forces took place in the summer of 1717, targeting the Voronezh, Kazan, and Nizhny Novgorod provinces. A well-organized army of about 17,000 men, including Kalmyks and Cossacks, invaded Russian territory, plundering settlements and enslaving approximately 30,000 people. The raid was conducted with considerable coordination, and the unprepared Russian forces were initially unable to resist. However, on 11 August 1717, Don Cossacks under the command of V. Frolov engaged the Tatars near the Ilovlya River. After a fierce battle, about 500 Tatars, 200 allied Cossacks, and 200 Kalmyks were killed, and between 1,000 and 1,500 Russian captives were freed

This setback did not deter the so-called Deli Sultan. On 30 October 1717, he launched another raid in the Don region and called upon Temirgoy and Besleney Circassians, Cossacks, and Tatars to join him. In response, Peter I dispatched Brigadier Gavril Kropotov with four dragoon regiments to secure the Don area.

With a force of around 10,000 men, Bakhti Giray attacked and besieged Cherkessk, but failed to take the town and withdrew after plundering the surrounding countryside. The failed invasion alarmed the Kabardian princes, who feared Russian retaliation. Prince Aslanbek Misostov wrote to Peter I, stating that although Bakhti Giray had invited the Kabardians to participate, they had refused and no Kabardian forces had taken part in the raid.

By 1718, the Crimean khan sought to eliminate Bakhti Giray. He dispatched his son Saadet Giray, who marched from Kabardia through Taman and Temryuk, gathering a force of Turks, Circassians, Tatars, and Cossacks. The decisive battle took place on the Kuban River, where Bakhti Giray’s army of about 3,000 men was destroyed. Bakhti Giray himself escaped with only a small group of followers to the upper reaches of the Kuban.

He later fled to Circassia and lived for a long time among the Abazins. In 1720, he carried out a raid against Kabardia. In the autumn of 1723, Bakhti Giray again raided Kabardia, attacking the possessions of Khotokchuk-Beg Misost and driving off about 1,000 horses. After this raid, he became known among the Kabardians as “the Crushing Sword.”

In 1724, a rebellion of Crimean murzas led by Jan Temir Shirinsky broke out and was supported by Deli Sultan. In August 1724, Bakhti Giray moved to Perekop and joined the rebel murzas, whose forces numbered between 10,000 and 40,000 men. As a result of the uprising, Saadet IV Giray lost his authority and was deposed, being replaced by Meñli II Giray. This caused many murzas to change sides, leading to the gradual collapse of the rebellion. Bakhti Giray, left with only about 7,000 men, was forced to return to the Caucasus. In January 1725, Jan Temir Shirinsky joined him while fleeing from Mengli Giray. Together, they attempted to resist the khan’s forces but were defeated and fled to Lesser Kabardia.

At the end of 1725, Bakhti Giray once again assembled a large army to march on Crimea. The Ottomans initially attempted to negotiate by sending him a large sum of money, but Bakhti distributed it among his men and refused peace unless he was recognized as khan of Crimea. After negotiations failed, the Ottomans deployed a strong force to secure the Crimean frontier. Bakhti Giray and Jan Temir Shirinsky were defeated once more and fled to the “Abaza Mountains,” accompanied by only about 300 Kalmyks.

In early 1726, Bakhti Giray re-entered the struggle for control of Kuban, this time allied with the Kalmyks, and led several raids against Ottoman Azov. In the summer, he left the Abazin mountains and moved to the Kalmyk Khanate, from where he continued his attacks on Azov. In March 1727, Crimean Tatar forces launched a campaign against the Kalmyks in an attempt to halt these raids, but the expedition ended unsuccessfully.

In 1728, Deli Sultan, having lost his remaining power, surrendered to the khan and was pardoned. Bakhti Giray was killed in 1729. Although the circumstances of his death differ across sources, it is generally accepted that he died during a clash with Kabardians near Baksan, together with his brother Murad Giray. According to some accounts, Bakhti Giray launched a campaign against Kabardia to collect tribute. In response, the Kabardians constructed defensive fortifications in the Baksan area. After two days of fighting, Bakhti Giray was wounded and the Tatar forces were defeated. During their retreat, they were pursued by Circassians, who killed Bakhti Giray and his brother with sabers. A different version is preserved in a Kalmyk report sent to the Russian tsar through the Collegium of Foreign Affairs. According to this document, the Kabardians initially surrendered without resistance and handed over a large number of captives, allegedly around one thousand. Considering this a victory, the Tatars began to celebrate, but during the night the Kabardians launched a surprise attack on the camp, completely defeating the Tatars and killing Bakhti Giray and his brother.

The Circassians later sent Bakhti Giray’s body to the Crimean khan. He was buried between early April and late May (the beginning of the month of Shawwal), and his grave is preserved in the Khan’s Cemetery in Bakhchisaray.

== Sources ==
- Sen, Dmitry (2010). Frontline Elites and the Problem of Stabilizing the Borders of the Russian and Ottoman Empires in the First Third of the 18th Century: The Activities of the Kuban Serasker Bakht-Girey (PDF). Rostov-on-Don: Southern Federal University. Archived from the original on 2016-03-05.
- Hrybovsky, Vladislav Volodymyrovych (2016). Biographical Data on the Elites of the Crimean Khanate: Problems of Source Study (The Case of Sultan Bakhty-Girey) (in Russian). Institute of Ukrainian Archaeography and Source Studies of the National Academy of Sciences of Ukraine.
- Sen, Dmitry Vladimirovich (2024). New Information on the Campaign of the Sultans Bakhty-Girey (Deli Sultan) and Murad-Girey against Kabarda in the Spring of 1729 (in Russian).

== See also ==
- Crimean Khanate
- Devlet II Giray
- Qaplan I Giray
- Kalmyk Khanate
- Kabardia
