= Battle of Kanzhal =

1708 Circassian victory over Crimean Tatars

- Part of the Crimean–Circassian wars
Date	September 18, 1708
Location	Kanzhal, Circassia
Result	Circassian victory

Belligerents
Crimean Khanate: Nogais; Kuban Circassians (defected) (Note: The Circassian unit in the Crimean army defected to the Kabardian side during the battle.); Ottoman Empire	Kabardia (East Circassia): Principality of Hatokhshoqo; Principality of Bechmirza

Commanders and leaders
Qaplan I Giray (WIA); Sahib Giray (POW); Shirin Beg †; Mansur Beg †; Yurulshi Beg †; Jarik Beg †; Hajji Ali Agha; Safi Giray (Ottoman Empire) Alegoth Pasha † (Ottoman Empire) Murtaza Pasha (POW)	Kurghoqo Hatokhshoqo; Jabagh Qazanoqo; Tatarkhan Bechmirza

Strength
44,000–52,000 troops; 15,000; c. 26,000; 5,000 Kuban Circassians; (Ottoman Empire) 4,000–6,000 (Note: The Ottoman army included 3,000–5,000 Sipahis and 1,000 Janissaries including the other units.); 6 heavy cannons	7,300–12,000

Casualties and losses
30,000–40,000; 11,000; Heavy; (Ottoman Empire) c. 30 survived; 100 mirzas killed; Majority destroyed 5,000 survived (Note: According to the data of the Russian ambassador in Istanbul at that time, P. A. Tolstoy, 5,000 men from the Khan’s army and only 30 from the Ottoman army survived.); 10,000 horses seized	Unknown (5 according to Dimitrie Cantemir)

The Kanzhal War (Kabardian: Къэнжал зауэ; Crimean Tatar: Къанжал дженки) or Crimean-Circassian War of 1708 was military conflict in 1708 fought between Circassians led by Kurghoqo Hatokhshoqo and Crimean Khanate alongside its allies led by Qaplan I Giray, which resulted in Circassian victory. It played a big role in decreasing foreign influence in Circassia. In 2013, the Russian Academy of Sciences described the battle as "an important event in the history of Circassians". It was fought near the village of Bylym on the Baksan River.

== Background ==
=== Crimean tribute ===
According to Crimean Khan sources, when Selim I Giray did not receive his annual tribute from the Kabardians, he sent his son Shahbaz Giray to demand tribute, including slaves, for two years. Shahbaz Giray was initially received honorably, as he came with a modest retinue. However, by chance, he saw the beautiful daughter of a Circassian who was not included in the list of slaves but was nevertheless forcibly captured against custom.

Her brothers, two brave young men, pretended not to be upset by what had happened and reassured their father, softening his grief, while secretly hoping to protect their sister’s honor by preventing her from being taken by the Crimeans. When a favorable moment came (while Shahbaz Giray was alone with the captive woman and his guards were drunk and unarmed), they suddenly attacked. They wounded or killed Shahbaz Giray and killed his guards.

Based on Kabardian legends recorded by S.B. Nogma (1794–1844), a Crimean Pasha stationed with his army in the Besleney territories was killed amid suspicions of an affair with the wife of Prince Zaurbek. Approximately 1,000 people from the hereditary clans of Dokshokov and Mahokov were identified as responsible and subsequently took refuge in Kabarda under the protection of Aslanbek Qeytuqo.

The reckoning of the Kabardians, who dared to resist the Crimean Khan and the Ottomans, came seven years later. In April 1707, Qaplan I Giray, sent his brother Meñli II Giray to Kabarda with a detachment of soldiers to demand submission, repentance, and compensation from the Kabardians for sheltering the fugitives. Six months later, Meñli returned empty-handed, reporting that the Kabardians had refused to meet any of the demands.

=== Kabardian Appeal ===
Refusing to pay tribute, the Kabardians appealed to Ottoman Sultan Ahmed III (1703–1730) with complaints against Khan Qaplan I Giray. They argued, “Since we have embraced Islam, it is no longer fitting for the Khan to demand tribute from us as if we were unbelievers.”

The envoys explained to the Padishah that, traditionally, it was customary to present slaves to every newly enthroned Khan. However, over the past 15 to 20 years, the Khans had changed too frequently, leaving them without enough children to fulfill this custom. Additionally, they noted, mosques were being built in every village and the five daily prayers were faithfully observed. Given these changes, they questioned whether it was reasonable to demand so many slaves and impose such harsh treatment. Along with their appeal, they sent 10 young men and women as a gift to the Sultan.

The Kabardian envoy was doomed from the start. Their desire for independence, withdrawal from the Transcuba region, refusal to hand over the fugitives, and finally, their refusal to pay tribute in slaves, all of this greatly angered the Ottoman Sultan.

== The Battle ==
=== The Crimean Campaign ===
Sultan Ahmed III unconditionally sided with the Crimean Khan, declared war on the Kabardians, and subsidized the campaign. Ambassador P.A. Tolstoy, writing from Constantinople, informed his government: “On July 18, [1708], I sent the Aglian ambassador’s secretary to the envoy with orders concerning the Crimean Khan’s campaign. It is certain that the Crimean Khan was commanded to go against the Circassians... The Khan received a decree from the Porte and, according to custom, a rare caftan, ordering him to lead an army of thirty or forty thousand Tatars to devastate the Circassians and burn their dwellings.”

Qaplan I Giray began the campaign in spring 1708, reaching Kabarda during the harvest season. He didn’t advance far into Kabarda but turned directly toward Elbrus, near the area of Bashtau. He set up camp in the upper reaches of the Malka River, on its right bank at the foot of Elbrus, in the region known as Lower Kangal. This spot was chosen deliberately, as previous Crimean Khans had camped here multiple times.

In the center of Lower Kangal was a mound known as the “Mound where the distribution of trophies took place,” where the Khan could set up his tent. The Malka River, behind the Crimean army, had the only ford nearby, called Babukin ford. Surrounding the camp were natural barriers like the slopes of Upper Kangal, offering protection.

At first glance, the location seemed ideal: spacious, naturally sheltered, with abundant pastures and easy access to clean mountain water an essential factor for both people and horses. However, despite these advantages, the site was also highly vulnerable.

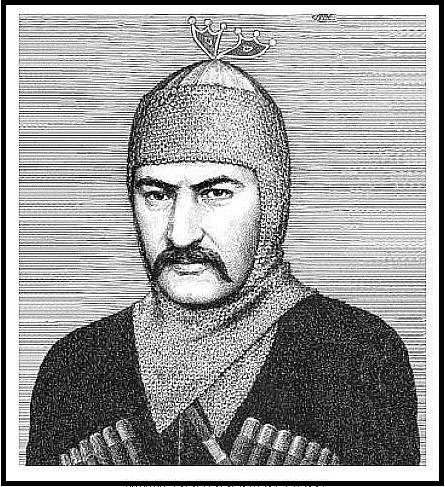
Kurghoqo Hatokhshoqo

=== Kabardian Resistance ===
The Kabardians had to choose: surrender to the occupiers or stand up to defend their homeland and independence. The Kabardian princes, led by their Supreme Prince Kurghoqo Hatokhshoqo. who had lived in constant anxiety since their re-emigration from Zakubanya, conferred and unanimously decided to resist. A general mobilization was carried out, everyone had to take up arms, “even boys as young as fourteen.”

Kabarda was able to field an army estimated between 7,000 and 30,000 men, half of whom were elite noble cavalry. Realistically, the force was likely around 10,000 to 15,000 men. However, the forces were unequal. It was clear that an open battle with the Crimean-Turkish army would likely result in catastrophic defeat.

Understanding that the attack could lead to the devastation and conquest of Kabarda, Grand Duke Kurghoqo Hatokhshoqo appealed to the Khan with a peace proposal, asking for a reduction in the size of the tribute. But Qaplan I Giray rejected these overtures, declaring, “I will accept no less than three thousand prisoners.”

The Kabardians then deliberately stalled negotiations for around 19 days, buying time to prepare. Eventually, while still feigning cooperation, they suddenly “attacked by night.”

=== First Stage ===
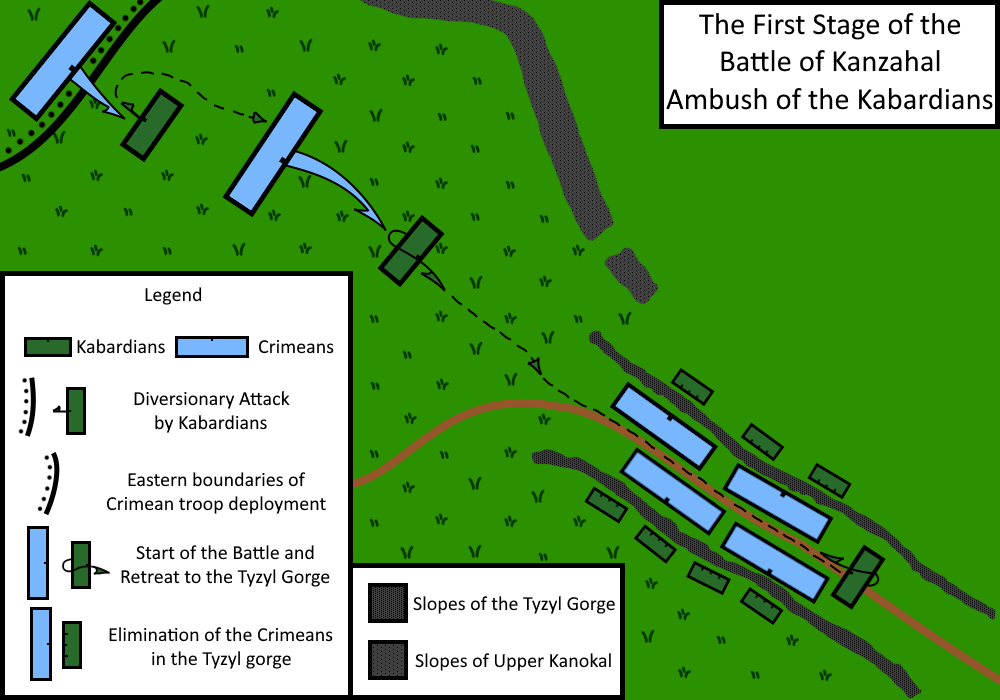
Ambush by the Kabardian Army

The first stage involved the Kabardian ambush detachments targeting a portion of the Crimean-Turkish army in the Tyzyl Gorge. Before the battle, the Kabardian warriors, as was customary, “swore oaths with swords and weapons.” The Kabardians executed a feigned attack to split the enemy forces, luring a detachment into the gorge, where they trapped and destroyed them with archers. They rolled stones and tree trunks down the slopes and then attacked the enemy cavalry, which had lost its mobility. This tactic of a false attack followed by a retreat was favored by the Circassians and had been used previously by Kabardian leaders Aligoko I and Hatoxho I at the Battle of Malka on July 12, 1641.

A description of the Battle of Kanzhal, recorded in 1748 from Kabardian accounts in the Russian Board of Foreign Affairs, supports this: “It has been forty years since the Crimean Khan led many Crimean and Kuban troops into Kabarda. The Kabardians drove their cattle into the mountains and avoided capture for a long time. Seeing he could not reach them from the steppe side, the Khan sent most of his troops into the mountains to harass the Kabardians. However, the Kabardians blocked all narrow mountain passes and, with the help of some Crimean and Kuban soldiers, covered these passes with stones. Then, in the mountains, the Crimean and Kuban forces suffered a crushing defeat by the Kabardians and other mountain peoples, with over 30,000 dying from battle and hunger. Elders from the nearby village of Zayukovo still believe the main battle took place in the Tyzyl Gorge.”

After the Battle of Kanjal, Pshi Tatarkhan Bekmurzovich wrote to his brother Alexander Bekovich: “The fighting with the Crimeans lasted one and a half to two months, with daily engagements.” This suggests the war was fought using guerrilla tactics. With limited military resources, the Kabardians were forced to avoid large-scale confrontations.

=== Second Stage ===
The second and decisive stage of the Battle of Kanzhal took place in September 1708, when the Kabardians launched a night attack on the remnants of the Crimean-Turkish army led by Khan Qaplan I Giray.

Anticipating a final confrontation, Grand Prince Kurghoqo Hatokhshoqo had preemptively staged an ambush in the Lower Kanzhal Forest, on the right bank of the Malka River. The location, remembered in Kabardian toponymy as “the place of the night ambush of the son of Hatokshoko,” was carefully chosen. In the mountains, summer nights are pitch black, making movement nearly impossible, so the night of a full moon was selected to ensure visibility and coordination between Kabardian units.

Using a combination of stealth and precision, Kabardian scouts silently eliminated enemy pickets, clearing the way for the ambush. The army then surrounded the enemy camp under cover of darkness, blocking all escape routes. When the attack began, it was sudden and overwhelming. Every major source, including Kabardian, Russian, Ottoman, and Moldavian reports, confirms the surprise nature of the night assault.

According to Moldavian lord Mikhailo Rakovica, writing to the Russian Embassy on December 4, 1708, the Crimeans were “killed because the enemy attacked at night, unexpectedly and in their sleep.” The Ottoman chronicler Seyyid Mehmed Rıza described how “the Circassians resorted to cunning and launched a night attack on the Khan’s camp, cutting down those who could not flee.”

One of the most detailed accounts comes from Pshi Tatarkhan Bekmurzovich, a Kabardian commander who participated in the battle. He explained the strategy of Qazanoqo Jabagh that a diversion was created using bundles of flammable pine and birch bark tied to the tails of 300 horses with scary masks, which were then set alight and driven into the enemy camp. As described by Dimitrie Cantemir, the horses, terrified by the fire, charged wildly into the sleeping Tatar camp, causing panic and stampede among the Crimean cavalry. The confusion was so great that the Tatars, waking up to flames and chaos, “thought fire had fallen from the sky, and that the end of the world had come.”

Though this tactic went against Circassian tradition, which revered horses and typically avoided their mistreatment, it was a desperate wartime measure. According to Abi de la Motraye (1711), “The moon, which some Circassians adore, revealed their enemies to them, and they cut down so many that only those on horseback managed to flee.” The Khan fled, leaving behind his tent, artillery, personal belongings, his brother, and even a son, who was captured and returned only after negotiations.

=== Aftermath ===
Kabardian forces completely encircled the enemy, fighting until morning. Though the Tatars resisted fiercely, they were outmaneuvered and crushed. Qaplan I Giray, wounded in the arm, barely escaped in his bloodstained caftan. According to Pshi Tatarkhan, around 11,000 Crimeans were killed, and thousands more were captured or scattered in the mountains. The Kabardians seized 14 cannons, 5 mortars, four thousand horses, a large amount of gunpowder, provisions, and all the enemy’s tents.

Kalmyk Khan Ayuka, in a conversation with a Russian envoy, confirmed the magnitude of the defeat: among the dead were “a hundred of the Khan’s best murzas,” and the Khan’s son was taken hostage. A Russian report from December 5, 1708 notes that only half of the Crimean seymens survived. Several prominent Nogai murzas and bey-level nobles were killed, including the “legendary” Alegot, who according to oral tradition, fell into a ravine and died clinging to a tree. That place is still remembered as Alegot-Gum and Szhypo “where Alegot the Fat fell into the abyss.” Some recent research has claimed that the noble Nogay Murza Allaguvat was hiding under the name Alegoth.

The scale of the defeat was such that it took the Kabardians three to seven days to bury the dead and divide the captured weapons and loot. The defeat and escape of Khan Qaplan I Giray was confirmed in Constantinople by the end of October 1708, and the Russian embassy monitored the situation closely. On August 29, the ambassador noted, “The Khan of the Crimeans has not yet returned from Circassia,” and on October 12, he added: “Still no word of the Crimean Khan or the Kuban people.”

== Mentions of the event by foreign sources ==
=== Abri de la Motre ===
Abri de la Motre (agent of the Swedish king Charles XII), who visited the Caucasus in 1711, gave a detailed description of this battle. Motre published a description of his travels in London in 1724 in English in two volumes. He republished them in French in 1727.

A brief chronology of events, according to Motre, is as follows:

- Circassians paid a large annual tribute to the sultan to avoid Tatar raids. However, the sultan did not fulfill this obligation and the Tatars raided all the way to the center of Circassia, robbing everything they could.
- Circassians thought not only to stop these attacks, but also to refuse to pay tribute. The Sultan formed a Tatar army against the Circassians (about 100 thousand in number, according to Motre).
- Circassians sent letters to Khan's camp expressing their obedience and asking for peace. Later, for 19 days, the Circassians stalled the enemy troops by negotiating the amount and quality of the tribute to be paid, and then unexpectedly attacked the camp from all sides and killed most of the soldiers.
- Leading those who escaped to save their lives, the Khan left his brother, son, field tools, tents and belongings.

=== Xaverio Glavani ===
Xaverio Glavani, the French consul in Crimea and the first doctor of the Khan in Bakhchysarai, wrote in his book "Circassian Statement" dated 20 January 1724:

The Crimean Khan wanted to compel the Kabardinians to give him more slaves and goods than he had previously agreed. The people took up arms, a bloody battle took place, the Tatars were completely defeated, the Khan himself barely managed to escape and lost his boots; More than 5,000 Tatars died in the war, including many nobles.

— Xaverio Glavani, Circassian Statement

=== Johann Gustav Gerber ===
Johann Gustav Gerber, who made a map of the Caucasus for Tsarist Russia in 1728 and a depiction of the peoples living in the Caucasus, also reported this war:

The people in two regions, Western Circassia and Kabardia, are the same nation and have been free people since ancient times. In different centuries, the Crimean Khan asked them to send him a gift every year, namely a good horse, a conch, a sword, an expensive bow or a beautiful girl that would not be found everywhere. However, the Circassians decided to leave this and killed the Crimean officials who were sent to receive the gift. After that, the Crimean Khan sent 30,000 soldiers and his vizier to raze their land against the Circassians. However, the Circassians pretended to escape from the Tatars, and led them along an unknown road until the middle of Kabardia and completely destroyed the Crimean army. Since then they have again gained complete freedom.

— Johann Gustav Gerber, Map of Caucasus

=== Engelbert Kämpfer ===
German traveler Engelbert Kämpfer also mentioned the event:

At the end of 1708, the Khan of the Little Tatari (Crimea) demanded twice the tax from neighboring Circassians for no reason; When the Circassians refused, they attacked with a large army. The Circassian prince did a trick and agreed with 30 young strong soldiers to kill the Khan's most noble officers and sent them as spies. At the same time, the Circassians attacked the enemy in such a way that, thanks to such confusion, a complete victory was achieved and the Tatar Khan was saved only with great difficulty.

— Engelbert Kämpfer

=== Other sources ===
In addition to the above, in the 18th century Ottoman writer Mehmet Funduklu, the former Moldovan ruler and scientist Dimitrie Cantemir and many others wrote about the victory of the Kabardinians over the Crimean Khan in 1708, although their reports agreed on the main point, sometimes differing in detail.

== Legacy ==
In 2008, Circassians celebrated the 300th anniversary of their victory in the Battle of Kanzhal. Circassian activists organized a trip in the direction of the war and a monument was erected in the area.

In 2018, events were organized for the 310th anniversary of the war. However, in the village of Kendelen, the local people of Balkar origin blocked the path of a Circassian flag group and attacked the celebrating Circassians, and Russian forces intervened as clashes between Circassians and Balkars intensified.

Similar clashes occurred in 2008 when the people of Karachay-Balkar hung posters "There was no battle in Kanzhal".
