= Battle of Derbent (1722) =

- Part of the Russo-Persian War (1722–1723)
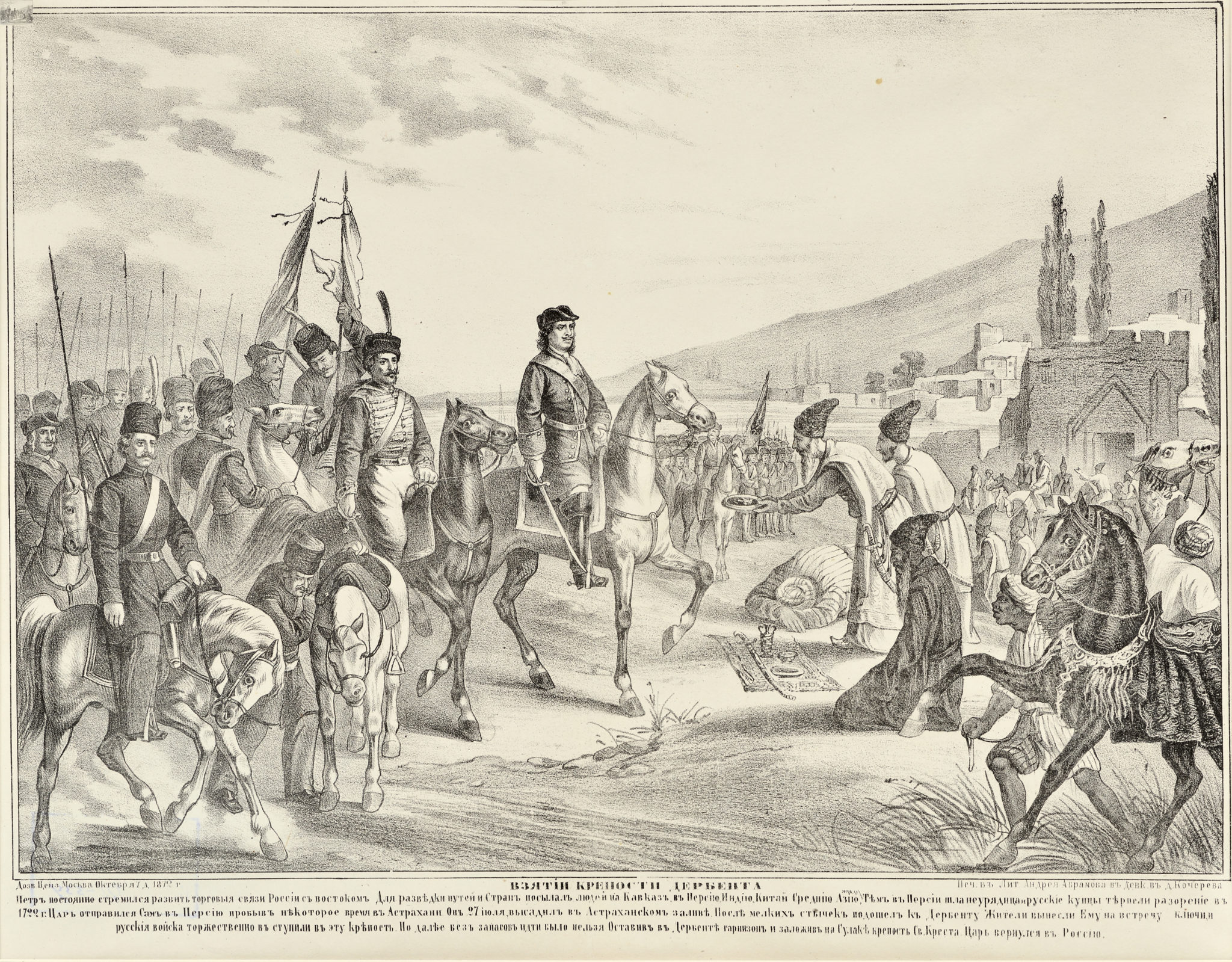
- Entrance of Peter the Great in Derbent
Date	August 1722
Location	Derbent
Result	Russian victory

Belligerents
(Russia) Russian Empire	Safavid Empire

Commanders and leaders
(Russia) Général Olof (WIA)	Imam Kulibek (surrendered)

Strength
22,000	Unknown

Casualties and losses
Unknown	Unknown

The Battle of Derbent was the occupation of Derbent by the Russian Empire during the Russo-Persian War. It took place in August 1722.

== Background ==
In August 1722, the Russian army began to rapidly advance towards Derbent. During this campaign, the Russian army also had to deal with the local population. The capture of Derbend was of strategic importance for the Russian army. After the capture of this city, coastal cities along the Caspian Sea could be captured. After Derbend, it was Baku's turn to be captured, but due to weather conditions, this march was postponed until next year.

== Occupy ==
Setting out from Astrakhan, Pyotr I with the cavalry advanced by land and the fleet by sea towards Derbent. On 25 July 1722, Pyotr I wrote a letter to the Safavid shah, and in this letter he stated that he did not come to occupy his lands, but only to punish the rebels who created problems for them, who killed the lives and property of Russian merchants. Leaving on 5 August, the Ru sordus encountered some resistance as far as Derbent. The main force organizing this resistance was the local principalities connected to the Ottoman Empire. After repelling these attacks, on 23 August, Darbend surrendered to the Russians without a fight. Sources mention this event as follows:

the governor of the city welcomed us and presented the key to the city.

The authorities in Darband were hospitable to the Russian army, their main goal being to establish good relations with the Russia state. Due to the storm that started at sea, the Russian fleet carrying food was seriously damaged. After that, Peter I, who temporarily stopped the campaign, returned to Astrakhan. Derbend was one of the main objectives of the campaign, and according to the plans of Peter I, it should play a key role in the capture of other regions in the future. Also, this city was planned to be one of the main intermediary regions for Russian merchants to buy eastern goods and sell them in the west.

During the Russian Caucasus campaign, Davud Bey, whom Peter I used as an excuse for interfering in the Safavid properties, continued his resistance against the Russians. Although he besieged Daband in 1722, he could not capture the city. After the failure, he retreated, plundering the regions around the city. At the time of this attack, Darbend had been in the hands of the Russians for several months.

== Result ==
According to the agreement signed by Ismayil Mirza, the representative of the new Safavid shah Tahmasp II in Petersburg in 1723, the Safavids would be sent from Darband to Gilan against the Afghan rebels. Caspian coastal provinces agreed to pass into the hands of the Russians. However, Tahmasib II, who learned about the terms of this agreement, did not ratify the agreement, and therefore, knowing that he would be executed, the representative Ismail Mirza did not return to the Safavid empire.

The Russian troops, who held the Safavid lands for a while, returned all the lands they had acquired in the campaign of 1722–1723 with the Treaty of Rasht in the first stage, and the Treaty of Ganja in the second stage.
