= Jabagh Qazanoqo =

East Circassian philosopher

Hajji Thamade Qadi Jabagh Qazanoqo
- Къэзэнокъуэ Жэбагъы

Advisor of the Kabardian Supreme Prince
- In office Early 1700s – 1748

Chief Qadi of Kabardia
- In office 1737–1750

Personal life
- Born: 1685 Zeiqo, Kabardia
- Died: 1750 (aged 64–65) Zeiqo, Kabardia
- Resting place: Nalchik
- Parent: Jembulat (father)
- Citizenship: Princedom of Kabardia

Religious life
- Religion: Islam
- Denomination: Sunni
- Jurisprudence: Hanafi
- Creed: Maturidi

Muslim leader
- Period in office: 17th and 18th century

Military service
- Nickname: Solon of the Caucasus
- Allegiance: Princedom of Kabardia
- Battles/wars: Battle of Kanzhal

Hajji Jabagh Qazanoqo (Kabardian: Къэзэнокъуэ Жэбагъы; Adyghe: Къэзэнэкъо Джэбэгъ; Russian: Жабаги Казаноков; Arabic: قنزنوقة جباغ) was a Kabardian Circassian jurist, philosopher, poet, thamate and diplomat. As the chief qadi (of Khabze and Sharia) and advisor to the Supreme Prince of Kabardia, he was known for his reforms reconciling Adyghe Khabze with Sunni Islam as well as his support for Pan-Caucasianism, inspiring the Sheikh Mansur movement and laying the ideological foundation for the Mountanious Republic.

== Biography ==
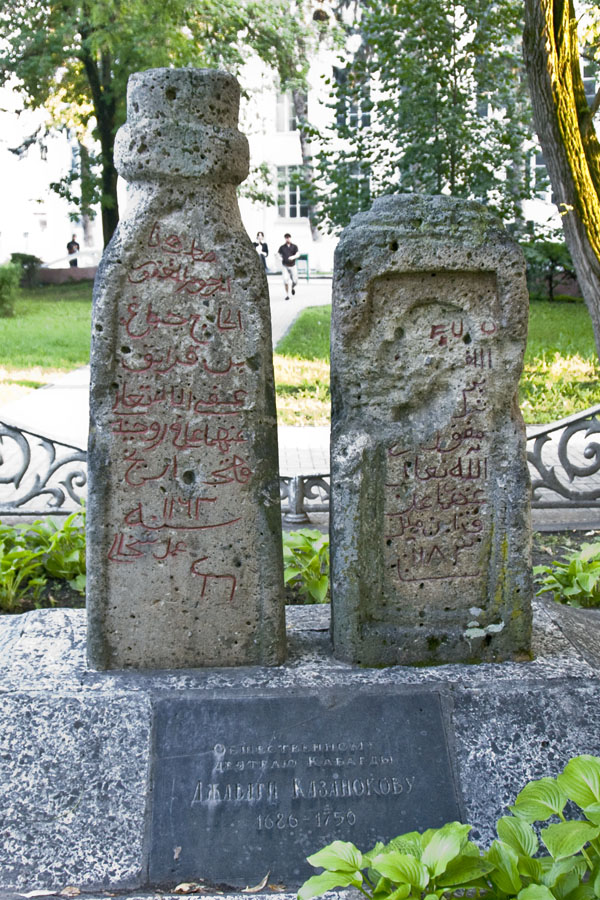
Qazanoqo's grave brought from Zeiqo (Zayukovo) to Nalchik

=== Early days ===
Born in the village of Zeiqo (modern-day Zayukovo) in Kabardia into the middle-ranking noble Qazanoqo family, which was affiliated with the Qeytuqo princely dynasty. He got an Islamic education and quickly became a revered thamade (elder) in Kabardia. He served as an advisor to the Supreme Prince Kurghoqo Hatokhshoqo during the pivotal Battle of Kanzhal, where his counsel is credited with contributing to the Kabardian Circassian victory.

Due to his rising fame, he was appointed as the teacher of the Kabardian noble and future Supreme Prince Aslanbech I. He personally led the election campaign for Aslanbech, resulting in his victory. After Aslanbech became the prince, Qazanoqo was his closest advisor and influenced Aslanbech's Pan-Caucasian views.

The first action of Prince Aslanbech was to introduce the principle that "only one state should exist between two seas. [Black Sea and Caspian Sea]". Aslanbech advocated for the unification of Dagestan with other regions of the Caucasus, but did not have enough time or opportunity to fully implement this principle.

=== Views and reforms ===
Qazanoqo was opposed the idea of Circassians living under another country and supported full independence. He believed that the Crimean Tatar raids to Kabardia should be put to an end, and that the Tatars wished to eventually annex Circassia, so he suggested Russia as a possible defensive ally. In 1722 he joined diplomatic meetings with Russia. In 1731, he managed to secure a defence agreement with Russia against Tatar raids. However, this alliance came to an end 15 years after his death when Russia attacked Kabardia, starting the Russo-Circassian War.

A significant reform of Adyghe Khabze is attributed to Qazanoqo. Qazanoqo defined Khabze as "that which is appropriate" or "harmonious" (Adyghe: хабзэр екIурэ). He systematically stripped away obsolete practices, restricted the absolute power of the princes over the free peasantry, advocated for increased rights for women, and completely transformed the system of blood revenge (Adyghe: лъышӀэжь). To break the cycle of vendettas, he formalized a reconciliatory ritual wherein a murderer could adopt and raise a child from the victim's family, thereby forging an artificial kinship that peacefully and legally terminated the feud. Qazanoqo is also credited with leading the reformation of Adyghe Khabze to remove aspects in contradiction to Islam, and establishing the Kabardian justice system based on the Quran and Khabze. The reforms he implemented facilitated the incorporation of Islam’s spiritual and moral values into the customary law of the Kabardians in particular. He altered the customs and traditions he deemed appropriate within Adyghe Khabze, abolished some, and introduced new ones. He adopted the idea that society should be based on discipline and morality. According to him, the state should arise from society and its duty should consist of regulating the lives and disciplines of the elements that constitute the society. The head of state should be elected but the person to be elected had to be qualified. Within Circassian studies, there is an academic field called "Qazanoqo studies" (казаноковедение). Qazanoqo is sometimes erroneously credited with creating the Khabze code. In one study, a Circassian man from the Uzunyayla region of Turkey has been quoted as saying "our Uzunyayla Khabze was established by Qazanoqo Jabagh" (Узун-Яйлэм ди хабзэр зыухуар Къэзэнокъуэ Жэбагъыс).

A pious Muslim, Qazanoqo completed the hajj in 1748 at the age of 64, becoming a hajji. Qazanoqo was trusted even by the next Supreme Prince, on his way to Mecca, he met with the Crimean Khan in Bakhchisaray as an envoy of Supreme Prince Bemat Kurghoqo. But after returning from the pilgrimage, he retired from political and military duties.

=== Death ===
Qazanoqo died in 1750 at his home village due to unknown causes. With the death of Qazanoqo, the intellectual and administrative awakening in the North Caucasus as well as the planned development initiatives were interrupted.

Following the deaths of Qazanoqo and Aslanbech, the successive Kabardian Supreme Princes failed to maintain the stability needed to uphold their ideals due to the escalating power struggle among the princes. The nobility split into two factions, weakening the internal unity of Kabardia. Taking advantage of this situation, Russia founded the Mozdok Fortress in 1763, marking the beginning of the Russo-Circassian War.

== Legacy ==
With his reforms and his advocacy for an independent, united North Caucasus, Qazanoqo remains a respected and influential figure today. He lives in Circassian tradition as a symbol of justice, wisdom and virtue. Surrounding peoples such as the Balkars have also tried to adopt him as their ethnic hero.

In 2014, the house where Qazanoqo was buried was identified in the Qazanoqey Kumb plain, located above the village of Zayukovo in the Kabardino-Balkaria Republic, on the right bank of the Baksan River. The burial site, preserved only in oral tradition, was definitively confirmed with the research of local historians from Nalchik, Maria Kotlyarov and Viktor Kotlyarov, as well as contributions from the villagers. On the initiative of the local people, two tombstones made of tuff were erected of Qazanoqo and his wife. This endeavor, which was met with indifference by official authorities, was realized entirely through the voluntary efforts and financial support of the local community.

In the Republics of Adygea and Karachay-Cherkessia, families of Qazanoqo's descendants are still alive.
