= Kuban campaign (1711) =

Russian-Kalmyk defeat of Crimean-Nogai Tatars

Kuban Campaign
- Part of the Russo-Ottoman War (1710–1713) and Great Northern War and Russo-Crimean Wars and Crimean–Circassian wars
Date	3 July – 6 September 1711
Location	Kuban
Result	Russian-Kalmyk-Kabardian victory

Belligerents
Tsardom of Russia; Kalmyk Khanate; Kabardia	Crimean Khanate; Nogai Horde

Commanders and leaders
(Tsardom of Russia) P. M. Apraksin; Chakdorjap Khan; Tatarkhan the Golden; Aslanbech the Red-Mustached	Bakhti Giray (WIA)

Strength
(Tsardom of Russia) 34,362; 5,000	30,000+ 4,000+

Casualties and losses
Insignificant	16,300+ killed 22,000 captured

The Kuban Campaign took place between the Russian-Kalmyk forces and Crimean-Nogai Tatars with the goal of diverting significant Tatar forces and accomplishing other goals, from 3 July to 6 September 1711.

== Prelude ==
The campaign intended to distract the Crimean Tatar forces. However, modern research suggests that the campaign in Kuban was an independent offensive. This offensive was aimed at countering Tatar incursions into Azov and cutting possible Kuban Host support for the main Tatar forces of Crimea. Additionally to show and extend Russian control over the steppe south of Azov and to link Peter's domains with his Circassian allies of St. Petersburg. Russian count P. M. Apraksin gathered 13,888 troops for the campaign, Kalmyk forces joined in which made up the total of 34,362 troops against Tatars.

== Campaign ==
On 3 July 1711, Apraksin headed to Kuban with his combined forces. On 5 August, Apraksin arrived to Azov and station there for 10 days to replenish supplies and get rest for army. On 14 August, army resumed the march. Apraksin wasn't aware that the peace treaty was already signed and the Purth Campaign ended when he was in Azov, but became aware of the treaty in mid-September, although continued his army's operations until then against Ottomans and Tatars. Whether this was the case or the Kuban Campaign was continued as a form of retaliation for what had happened in Moldavia is disputed. Regardless, the Kuban valley had large number of livestock and limited defences, making it a perfect target. Contemporary Ottoman sources state the fortifications were half-destroyed and guarded by insignificant numbers of forces, artillery was extremely limited. The strength of the Kuban garrison consisted of 10,000 renegade Cossacks and staroobrydny, with total strength of 23,000, which was poorly trained.

On 26 August, Apraksin separated his forces in two columns. Vanguard contingent was commanded by Colonel Ivan Lyvov and consisted of 18,460 troops, moved forward to prevent the concentration of enemy forces following a series of skirmishes with the Nogais. The only major Tatar concentration was vanquished on 29th near the Kuban River, 5,000 Tatars drowned in the river, nearly 22,000 Tatars fell into captivity, including women and children. Kalmyks wiped out Nureddin-Sultan's forces, killing 11,300 Tatars.

Apraksin marched northeast along the river and then back to Azov through the Kuban Steppe after devastation of Tatars. In early September, Apraksin received the news about 4,000 Nogais returning from their raid, which were ambushed by Kalmyks and defeated, freeing several thousand Russian captives. On 6 September, Apraksin was attacked by 7,000 troops led by Nureddin-Sultan, which were also defeated. Apraksin was later informed of the Russian defeat at Pruth, so he ended his campaign in haste.

=== Actions of the Kabardians ===
At the beginning of 1711, the Kabardian rulers decided to return to Russian allegiance and in February agreed with the commander of the Saratov garrison, N. P. Beklemishev, on joint actions against the Turks. In June, Kabardian envoys arrived in Azov, promising to raise up to 15,000 horsemen from Circassia and Kabarda, and together with laborers up to 30,000 men. At a gathering in Greater Kabarda, Prince Alexander Bekovich-Cherkassky promised the rulers the protection of Russia. Devlet-Girey’s attempt to raise the Kumyks against Kabarda, in order to bring all of the North Caucasus under Crimean control up to the Persian border, failed.

On August 30, five thousand Kabardians under the command of Bekovich-Cherkassky’s brother, Prince Tatarkhan Bekmurzovich, marched one hundred versts and, after a short battle on the banks of the Kuban River, routed a 10,000-strong army of the Nureddin and about 150 Nekrasovites. They pursued the enemy for two hours, killed 359 and captured 40 men, and seized 2,700 horses. Many Nogais drowned trying to escape across the river. The Nureddin, wounded in the leg, escaped with only a small number of people. Few Nekrasovites survived. The Kabardians lost 70 killed and 120 wounded. In 1712, the Posolsky Prikaz rewarded the three main princes with furs worth 3,000 rubles and 2,000 rubles in cash, and on May 16, 1713, Peter I sent a letter of gratitude.

== Aftermath ==
On 29 December, Apraksin reached Kazan, which he governed. Apraksin's campaign in Kuban might've been the first successful military endeavour, carried out on such a scale by the Tsardom of Russia against Pontic nomads. Russian forces performed the best during Kuban campaign, winning every battle and skirmish against the enemy. Discipline was high, battle orders were executed in order and the casualties were insignificant. Despite the fact that Russia both in war and the peace lost at Pruth in 1711, a successful campaign conducted in Kuban same year marked a turning point in the history of the Pontic steppes.

== See also ==
- Kuban Pogrom (1717)
