= Saadet IV Giray =

Khan of Crimea from 1717 to 1724

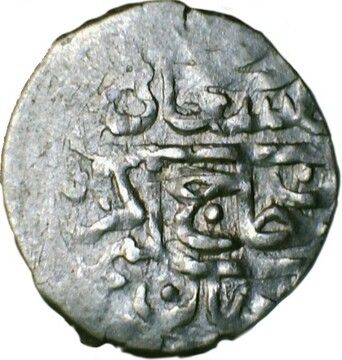
- Obverse of a coin with Saadet IV's name and titles written in Arabic

Khan of the Tatar Crimean Khanate
- Reign: 1717 – 1724
- Predecessor: Devlet III Giray
- Successor: Meñli II Giray
- Born: 1662
- Died: 1732 (aged 70)
- Father: Selim I Giray
- Religion: Sunni Islam

Saadet IV Giray (Note: Crimean Tatar, Ottoman Turkish and Persian: سعادت کرای رابع) (1662 – 1732) was the Khan of Crimea from 1717 to 1724. He was born in 1662 and died in 1732 at the age of 70.
