= Minor hydro-electric plants of Kabardino-Balkaria =

Hydroelectric power plants in Kabardino-Balkaria, Russia

On the territory of Kabardino-Balkaria republic a number of minor hydro-electric plants are located.

Most important of them are the Baksanskaya HEP (on the Baksan River, 25 MW, was completed in 1939), Aushigerskaya HEP (on the Cherek River, 60 MW, was completed in 2002) and the Kashkhatau HEP (which is also on the Cherek River, 65,1 MW, was scheduled for completion in 2008).

All of them are currently owned by the Kabardino-Balkaria subsidiary of the OJSC HydroOGK.

In service:

- MHEP-3 on the Baksan-Malka irrigation channel. Constructed in 1995–2000. Current power output – 3,75 MW. MHEP is scheduled for redevelopment for the power output to be about 10,5 MW.
- Akbashskaya HEP on the Malka-Terek irrigation channel. Constructed in 1928, produced 0,35 MW but later ruined. Reconstructed in 1995 to produce 1,1 MW.
- Mukholskaya HEP on the Cherek Balkarskiy River (near the Verkhnyaya Balkaria settlement). In service since 1962 producing 0,64 MW. Currently in process of reconstruction.

Out of service:

- Sovietskaya MHEP (in service 1959–2008) – 2 MW, 15 mln kWh per year.
- Soldatskaya MHEP – 0,36 MW.

Projected:

- Zaragizhskaya HEP (or Cherekskaya MHEP) – Planned for December 2009, 15–15,6 MW expected.
- Verkhnebalkarskaya HEP – Scheduled for 2009, 14,7–15,6 MW expected.
- Adyr-Su HEP – Expected to start operation in the fall of 2009 or later, 24-24,5 MW approx.
- Kara-Su HEP – Scheduled for completion in 2009, 4,5 MW expected.
- Mukholskaya HEP N2 – Construction dates unknown, 1,78 MW.
- Greta Energy projects includes construction of the cascade of 6 MHEPs – 4 on the Khaznidon River and 2 on the Urukh River in the Leskensky District of the K-B republic. Total power output estimates 45 MW. Projected for commission in 2012–2013. Other project of the Greta Energy includes the completion of 12 MHEPs with total power estimate 66,7 MW.
- MHEPs cascade on the Malka River includes the completion of for HEPs – Sarmakovskaya, Kamennomostskaya, Khabazskaya and Bolshoy Lakhran

with total power output of 96 MW. They are scheduled for completion in 2012–2015.
