= Nalchik river =

Nalchik
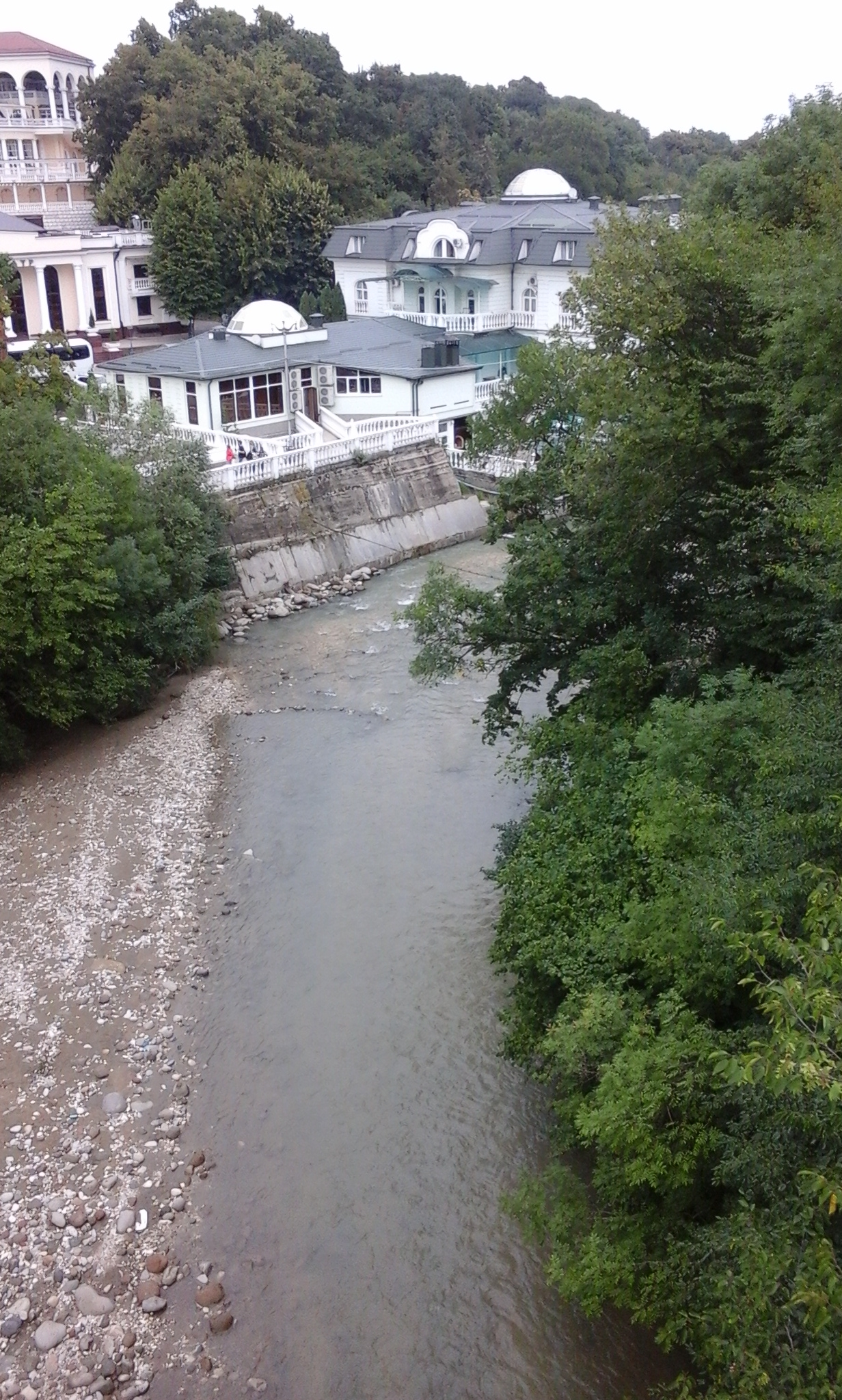

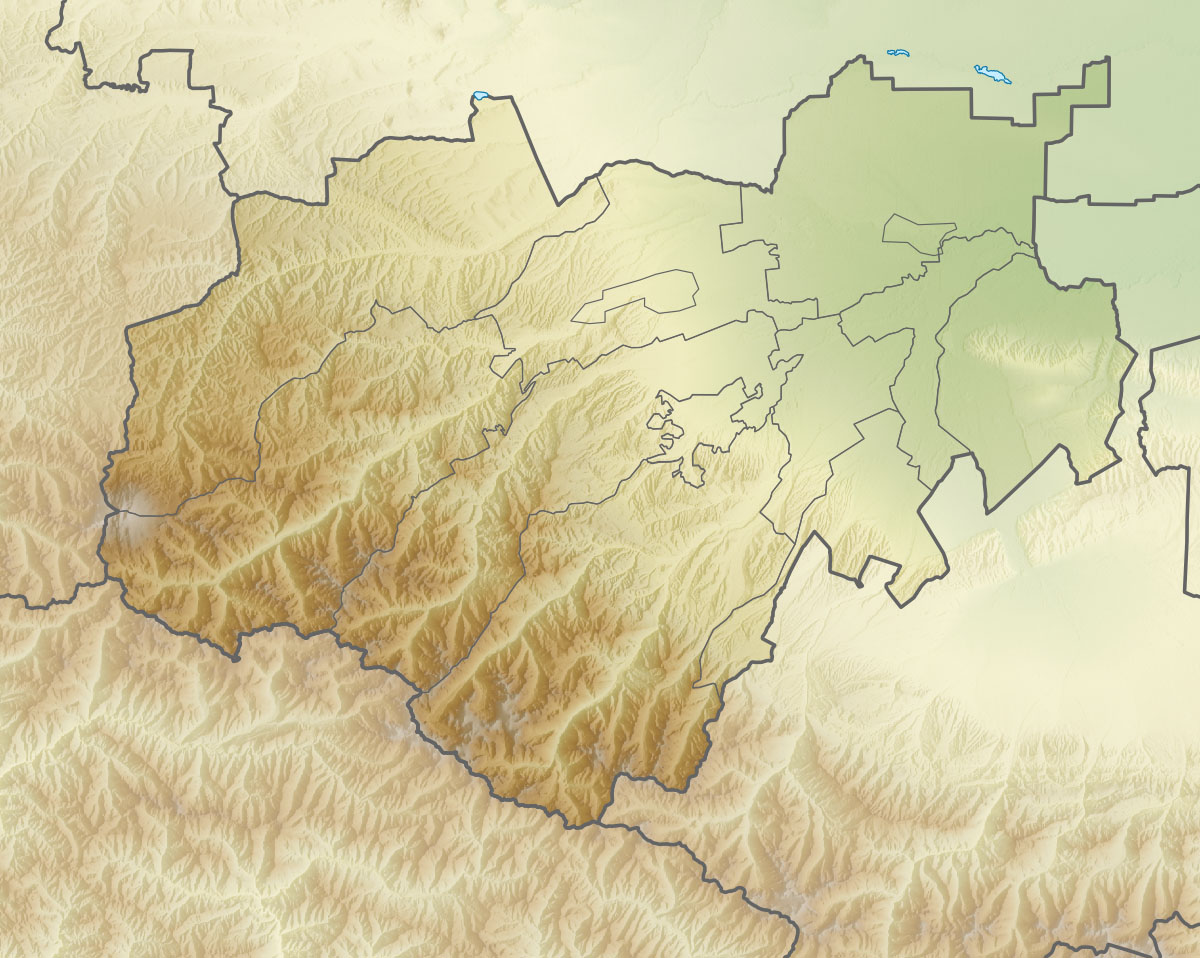
- Location within Kabardino-Balkaria Location within Caucasus Mountains

Location
- Country: Kabardino-Balkaria (Russia)

Physical characteristics
- Mouth: Urvan
  - coordinates: 43.5369°N 43.7692°E
- Length: 54 km (34 mi)
- Basin size: 440 km^{2} (170 sq mi)

Basin features
- Progression: Urvan→ Cherek→ Baksan→ Malka→ Terek→ Caspian Sea

The Nalchik (Russian: Нальчик) is a river in Kabardino-Balkaria, Russia. It is a left tributary of the Urvan, which is a branch of the Cherek. It is 54 kilometres (34 mi) long with a drainage basin of 440 square kilometres (170 mi^{2}). It flows through the city Nalchik, the capital of Kabardino-Balkaria. Its banks are eroded to the point of needing fortifications.
