= Chegem (river) =

Russian river

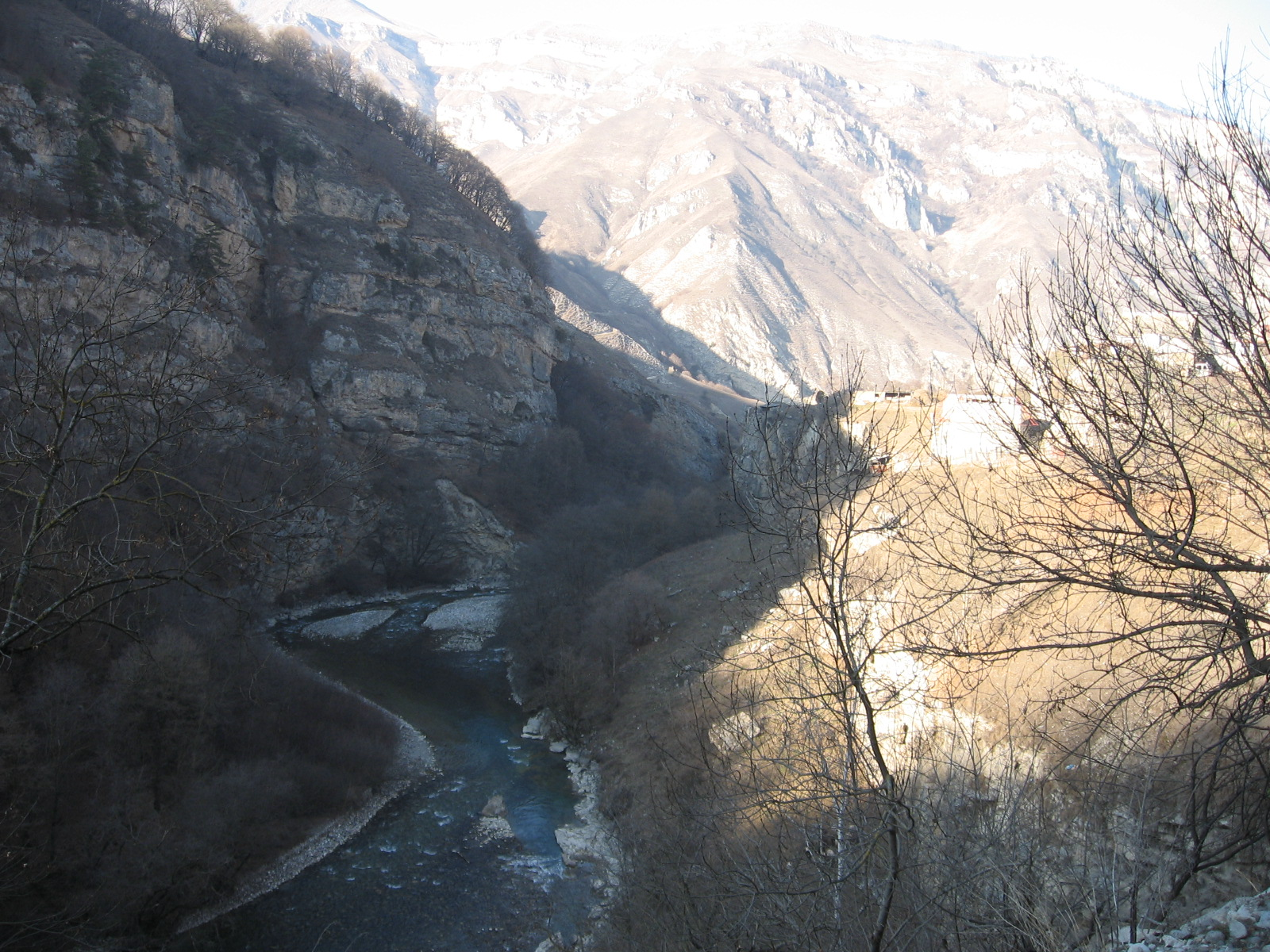

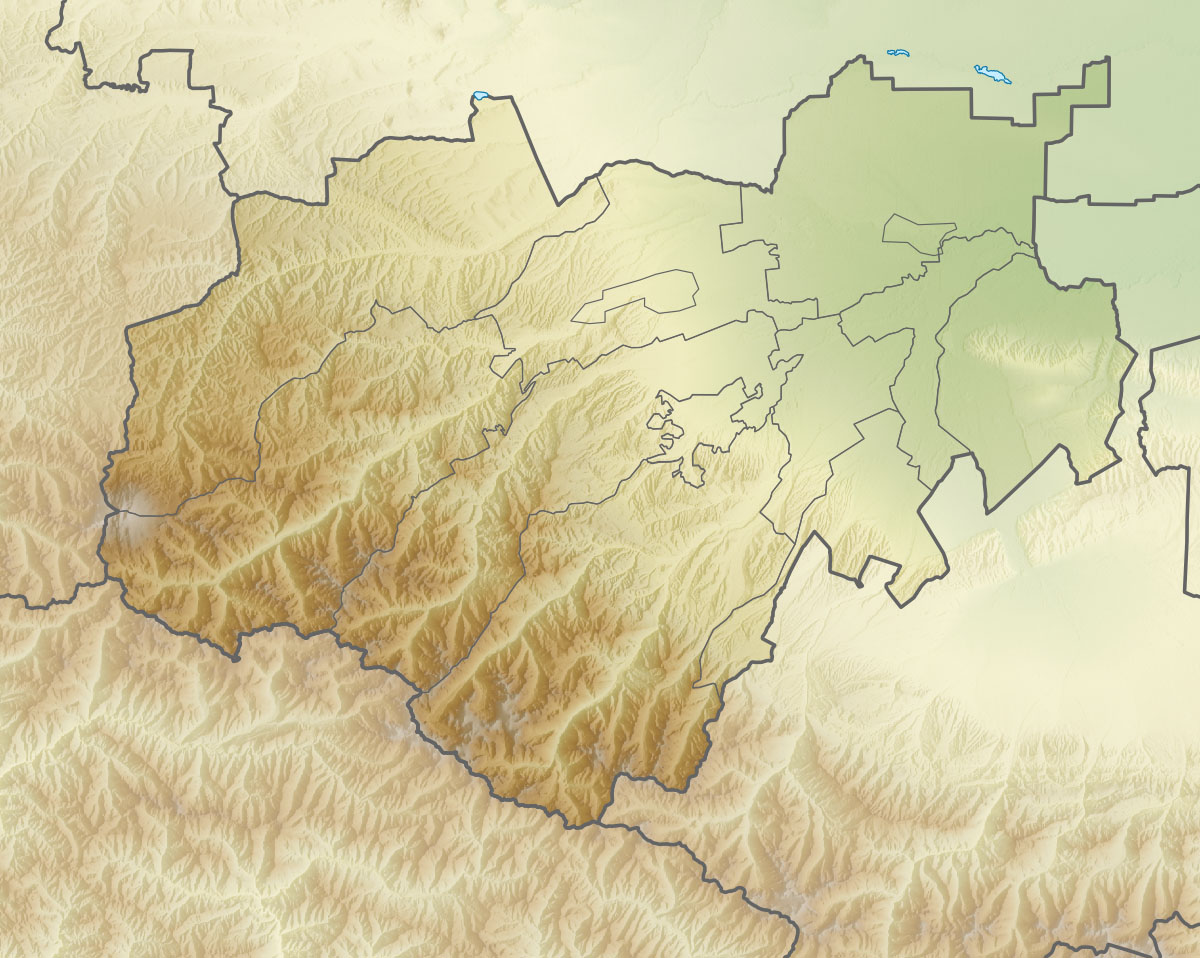
- Location within Kabardino-Balkaria Location within Caucasus Mountains

Location
- Country: Russia
- Federal subjects: Kabardino-Balkaria

Physical characteristics
- Source
  - location: Greater Caucasus
- Mouth: Terek
  - coordinates: 43.1841°N 42.9078°E
- Length: 103 km (64 mi)
- Basin size: 931 km^{2} (359 sq mi)

Basin features
- Progression: Terek→ Caspian Sea

The Chegem (Karachay-Balkar: Чеге́м суу, romanized: Çegem suw) is a river in Kabardino-Balkaria (Russia). Its length - 103 km, and basin size 931 km^{2}.

== Description ==
The Chegem River originates from the Bashil glacier, on the northern slope of the Main Caucasian Range, east of Elbrus. In the very upper reaches, before the confluence with the Gara-Auzusu River, it has another name - Bashil-Auzusu.

The Chegem River flows in a northeasterly direction, along the Chegem Gorge. Reaching the plain, it divides into two channels, Chegem the 1st and Chegem the 2nd, then reconnects and flows into the Baksan River. The Chegem River flows very quickly and is especially full of water in the summer months, during the period of the strongest snowmelt in the mountains.

The slope of the river is more than 30 m/km.

Part of the riverbed (about 3 km) passes through a narrow canyon, the main attraction on the river is the canyon and the Chegem waterfalls. However, the largest (78 m) Abay-Su waterfall is located on the Bashil-Auzusu tributary and is less known to tourists due to inaccessibility.

== Water registry ==
According to the State Water Register of Russia, the Chegem River belongs to the Western Caspian Basin District, the water management section of the river is Baksan, without the Cherek River. The river basin of the river is the rivers of the Caspian Sea basin between the Terek and the Volga.

== See also ==
- Battle of Chegem, 1804
