= Battle of Chegem =

- Part of the Russo-Circassian War and Kabardian Uprising of 1804
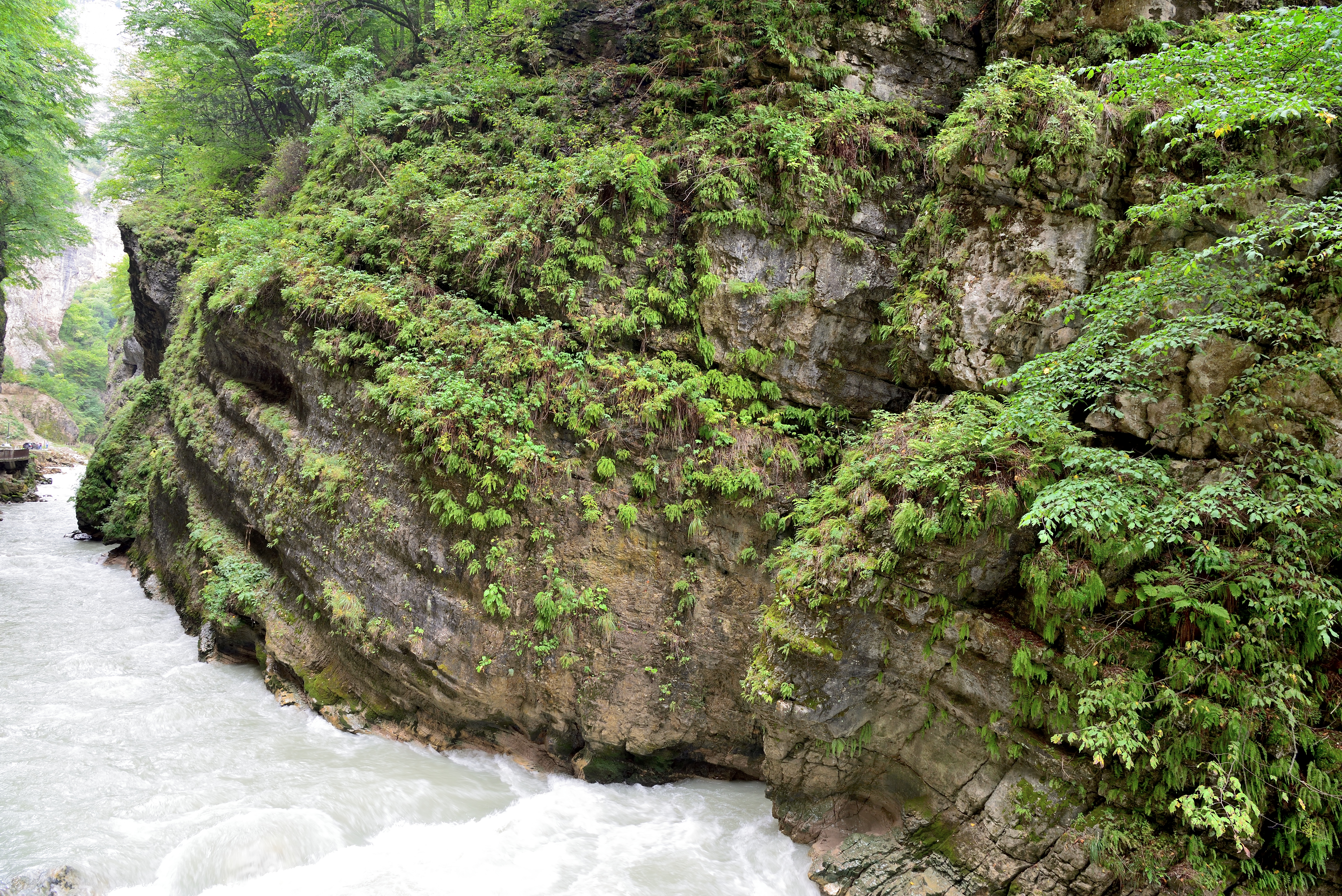
- The Chegem River
Date	9 May, 1804
Location	Chegem Region, Balkaria, North Caucasus
Result	North Caucasian victory: Caucasians forced the Russian forces to retreat towards Georgievsk; In retaliation, the Russian army burned 80 Kabardian villages and expelled many inhabitants across the Kuban River.

Belligerents
Kabardia (East Circassia); Karachay-Balkars; Ossetians; Ingush societies Chechens	Russian Empire

Commanders and leaders
Adildjeriy Hatokhshoqo; Efendi Ishak Abukov	(Russian Empire) Lieutenant General Ivan Glazenap (Russian Empire) Major Likhachev (Russian Empire) General Meyer

Strength
11,000 troops	~2,000 troops ~later 7,000–12,000 troops (estimate)

Casualties and losses
Unknown	Unknown
- 12 Circassian auls (villages) destroyed

The Battle of Chegem was a significant engagement during the Kabardian Uprising of 1804, part of the broader Russo-Caucasian War. It took place on May 9, 1804, between the forces of the Russian Empire and a coalition of Kabardians, Karachay-Balkars from Chegem, and Ossetians. The battle was part of an anti-colonial rebellion aimed at resisting Russian expansion into Kabardia and the construction of Kislovodsk fortress.

== Background ==
In early 1804, tensions escalated between the Russian Empire and the North Caucasian peoples, particularly the Kabardians, due to Russian military expansion and the construction of Kislovodsk fortress. The Kabardian aristocracy, led by Adil-Giray Atazhukin and Efendi Ishak Abukov, initiated a widespread rebellion. Their demands included the removal of Russian military posts and the cessation of Cossack settlements in Kabardian lands.

By May, the rebellion had gained widespread support among Kabardians, Balkars, Karachays, and Ossetians. The Kabardians were also supported by the Chechens and Ingush. After an initial defeat near the Baksan River, the outgunned rebels retreated to the Chegem region and called for reinforcements. The Russian commander Lieutenant General Ivan Glazenap responded by launching a major offensive, leading to the decisive Battle of Chegem on May 9, 1804.

== Battle ==
The battle began at 11:00 AM and lasted until 6:00 PM, with fierce combat taking place in the gorges and mountain passes near Chegem. According to Glazenap’s own report to Tsar Alexander I, the Russian forces, including Cossacks, fought against an estimated 11,000 North Caucasian warriors.

The North Caucasian coalition initially had the advantage due to their knowledge of the terrain, engaging in hit-and-run tactics and ambushes. The Russians, however, were well-equipped with artillery and disciplined infantry formations, allowing them to counter the attacks. After several hours of intense fighting, Glazenap’s forces managed to capture and burn 12 fortified auls (villages).

The North Caucasian forces continued to resist throughout the day. Eventually, the Russian forces were forced to retreat toward Georgievsk, where they were briefly besieged by Kabardian fighters.

== Aftermath ==
Following the battle, the Russian army carried out brutal reprisals against the North Caucasian population:

- 80 Kabardian villages were burned, displacing thousands of civilians.
- Many survivors fled to seek refuge among the Abazas, Karachays and Balkars.
- The rebellion continued in September 1804, when 7,000 Kabardian fighters launched another offensive, only to be defeated once more by Russian forces.
- Russian forces remained in Kabarda until spring 1805, suppressing any remaining resistance.

By 1810, after years of warfare, starvation, and plague, Kabardian resistance was largely crushed, and 200 more auls were destroyed in further Russian campaigns.

== Significance ==
The Battle of Chegem was a pivotal moment in the Russo-Caucasian War and the Kabardian resistance movement. It highlighted:

- The determined resistance of the North Caucasian peoples against Russian colonization.
- The devastating impact of Russian military reprisals, including the destruction of villages and mass displacement.
- The long-term consequences of the Russian conquest of Kabarda, which led to social upheaval and the eventual Caucasian War (1817–1864).

Despite their defeat, the Kabardians, Balkars, Karachays, and other North Caucasian groups continued to resist Russian rule for decades, culminating in the larger Caucasian War and the forced exile of many Circassian and other north Caucasians populations in the 1860s.
