= Kabardino-Balkaria =

Republic of Russia in the North Caucasus

Kabardino-Balkarian Republic Кабардино-Балкарская Республика (Russian)
- Republic

Other transcription(s)
  - Kabardian: Къэбэрдей-Балъкъэр Республикэ
  - Karachay-Balkar: Къабарты-Малкъар Республика
- Flag Coat of arms
- Anthem: State Anthem of the Kabardino-Balkarian Republic
- Interactive map of Kabardino-Balkarian Republic
- Location within European Russia
- Coordinates: 43°35′N 43°24′E
- Country: Russia
- Federal district: North Caucasian
- Economic region: North Caucasus
- Capital: Nalchik

Government
  - Type: Parliament of the Kabardino-Balkarian Republic
  - Head: Kazbek Kokov

Area
  - Total: 12,470 km^{2} (4,810 sq mi)

Population (2021 Census)
  - Total: 904,200 ▲: 57.1% Kabardins; 19.8% Russians; 13.7% Balkars; 3% Cherkess; 6.7% other
  - Estimate (2018): 865,828
  - Rank: 56th
  - Density: 72.51/km^{2} (187.8/sq mi)

GDP (nominal, 2024)
  - Total: ₽291 billion (US$3.41 billion)
  - Per capita: ₽321,884 (US$3,777.05)
- Time zone: UTC+3 (MSK)
- ISO 3166 code: RU-KB
- License plates: 07
- OKTMO ID: 83000000
- Official languages: Russian; Balkar; Kabardian
- Website: glava.kbr.ru

Kabardino-Balkaria (Russian: Кабарди́но-Балка́рия), officially the Kabardino-Balkarian Republic, (Note: Russian: Кабарди́но-Балка́рская Респу́блика, romanized: Kabardino-Balkarskaya Respublika; Kabardian: Къэбэрдей-Балъкъэр Республикэ, romanized: Ķêbêrdej-Baĺķêr Respublikê; Karachay-Balkar: Къабарты-Малкъар Республика, romanized: Qabartı-Malqar Respublika) is a republic of Russia located in the North Caucasus. As of the 2021 Census, its population was 904,200. Its capital is Nalchik. The area contains the highest mountain in Europe, Mount Elbrus, at 5,642 m (18,510 ft). Mount Elbrus has 22 glaciers that feed three rivers — Baksan, Malka and Kuban. The mountain is covered with snow year-round.

== Geography ==
The republic is situated in the North Caucasus mountains, with plains in the northern part. The republic shares an international border with Georgia.

- Area: 12,500 square kilometers (4,800 sq mi)
- Borders:
  - internal: Stavropol Krai (N/NE), North Ossetia–Alania (E/SE/S), Karachay–Cherkessia (W/NW)
  - international: Georgia (Racha-Lechkhumi and Kvemo Svaneti, Zemo Svaneti) (S/SW)
- Highest point: Mount Elbrus (5,642 m)
- Maximum N->S distance: 167 kilometers (104 mi)
- Maximum E->W distance: 123 kilometers (76 mi)

Kabardino-Balkaria is traversed by the northeasterly line of equal latitude and longitude.

=== Rivers ===
Major rivers include:

- Terek River (623 km)
- Malka River (216 km)
- Baksan River (173 km)
- Urukh River (104 km)
- Chegem River (102 km)
- Cherek River (76 km)
- Argudan River
- Kurkuzhin River
- Lesken River

=== Lakes ===
There are about 100 lakes in the Republic, none of which is large. Just over half (55) are located between the Baksan and Malka rivers. Some of the lakes are:

- Tserikkel Lake (area 26,000 m^{2}; depth 368 m)
- Lower Goluboye Lake
- Kel-Ketchen Lake (depth 177 m)
- Upper Tserikkel Lake (depth 18 m)
- Sekretnoye Lake
- Tambukan Lake (area 1.77 km^{2}; depth 1.5 to 2 m), partially within Stavropol Krai.

=== Mountains ===
- Mount Elbrus (5,642 m), a volcanic mountain and the highest peak in Europe, Russia, and the Caucasus

Other major mountains include:

- Mount Dykhtau (5,402 m)
- Mount Koshtantau (5,151 m)
- Mount Shkhara (5,068 m)
- Pushkin Peak (5,033 m)
- Mount Mizhergi (5,025 m)

=== Natural resources ===
Kabardino-Balkaria's natural resources include molybdenum, tungsten, and coal.

=== Climate ===
The republic has a continental-type climate.

- Average January temperature: −12 °C (10 °F) (mountains) to −4 °C (25 °F) (plains)
- Average July temperature: +4 °C (39 °F) (mountains) to +23 °C (73 °F) (plains)
- Average annual precipitation: 500–2,000 mm.

== History ==
The ancestors of the modern Kabardians, known as Circassians or Kassogs, have inhabited the area since at least the 6th century BCE. During this period, the region was known as Zichia, a medieval Circassian land located on the northeastern shore of the Black Sea. Historical sources first mention Zichia in the 6th century, with Byzantine historian Procopius of Caesarea recording that the people of the Zechoi had a king appointed by the Roman Emperor but had since become independent. The Notitiae Episcopatuum of the Patriarchate of Constantinople mentions an autocephalous archbishopric of Zichia from the 7th century onward, associated with Tamatarcha or the Cimmerian Bosporus.

Between 1242 and 1295, the region came under the control of the Mongols. From 1295 to around 1427, it was governed by the Georgians. In the early 15th century, the area became part of Circassia, which remained independent until the death of King Inal in 1453. Afterward, the kingdom experienced internal divisions and external pressures, leading to a gradual decline in its sovereignty.

Between 1769 and 1830, during the Russo-Circassian War, the region fell under Russian occupation. This period was marked by significant conflict and resistance from the indigenous populations. The war culminated in the annexation of Kabardino-Balkaria by Russia, leading to profound changes in the region's political and social structures.

During the Soviet era, Kabardino-Balkaria was part of the Russian SFSR, undergoing industrial growth but also facing cultural suppression. After the USSR's collapse, it became a republic within Russia and, on 1 July 1994, signed a power-sharing agreement granting it limited autonomy. This agreement allowed the republic to manage its own affairs to some extent, though it remained under the sovereignty of the Russian Federation. In 2001, Kabardino-Balkaria adopted a new constitution that reaffirmed its status within the Russian Federation, explicitly preventing the republic from existing independently.

== Politics ==
The head of government in Kabardino-Balkaria is the Head. The current Head is Kazbek Kokov. The legislative body of the Republic is the Parliament comprising 70 deputies elected for a five-year term.

The republic adopted a new constitution in 2001 which prevents the republic from existing independently of the Russian Federation.

== Administrative divisions ==
Kabardino-Balkaria is a federal subject of Russia.

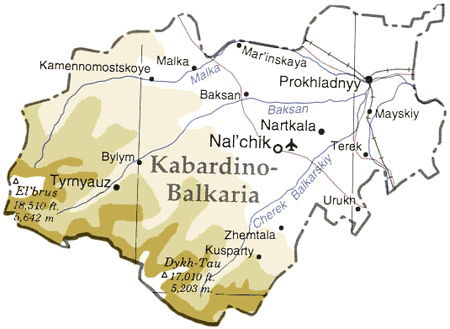
Map of the republic

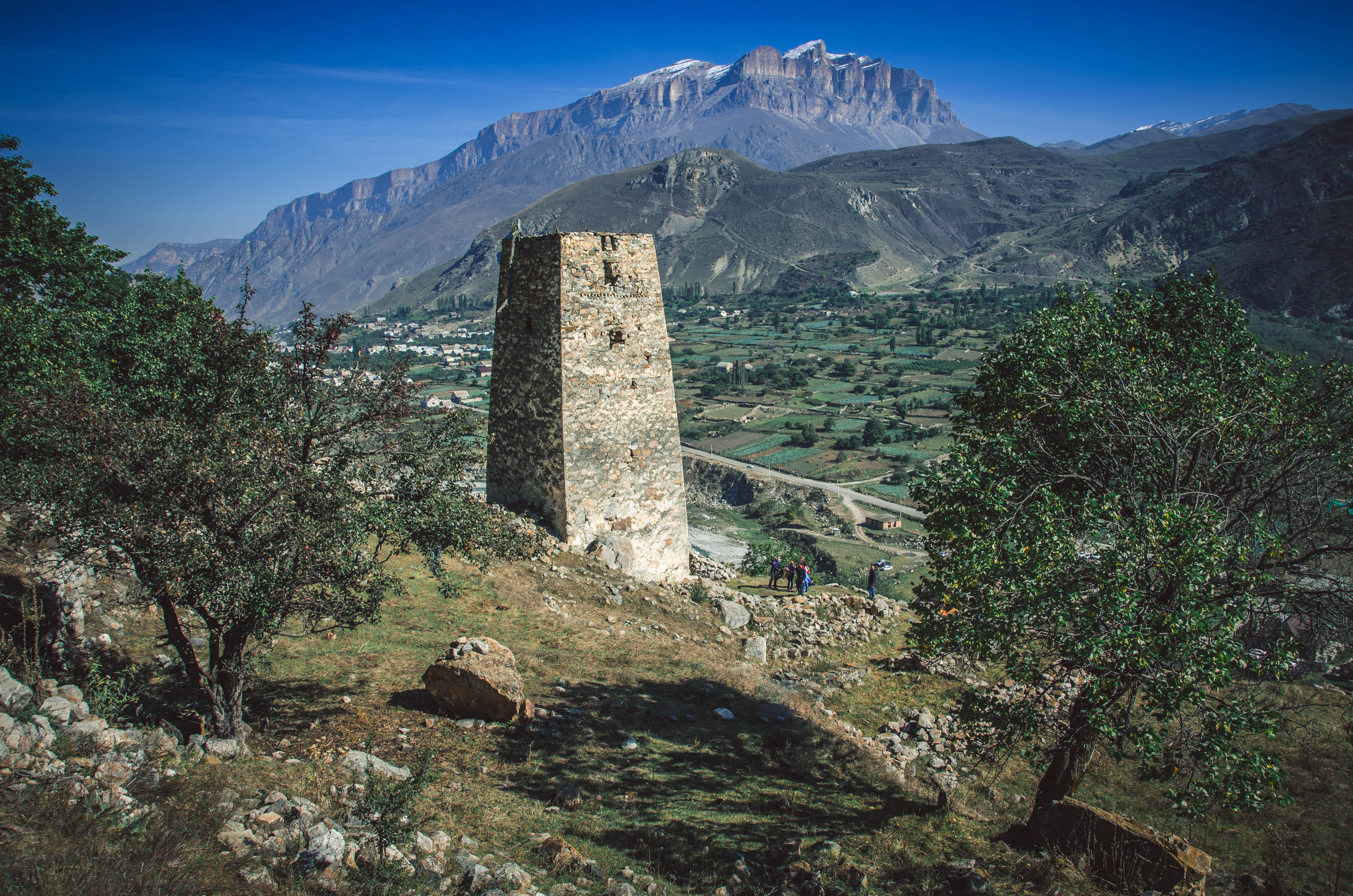
Cherek-Balkarskaya gorge

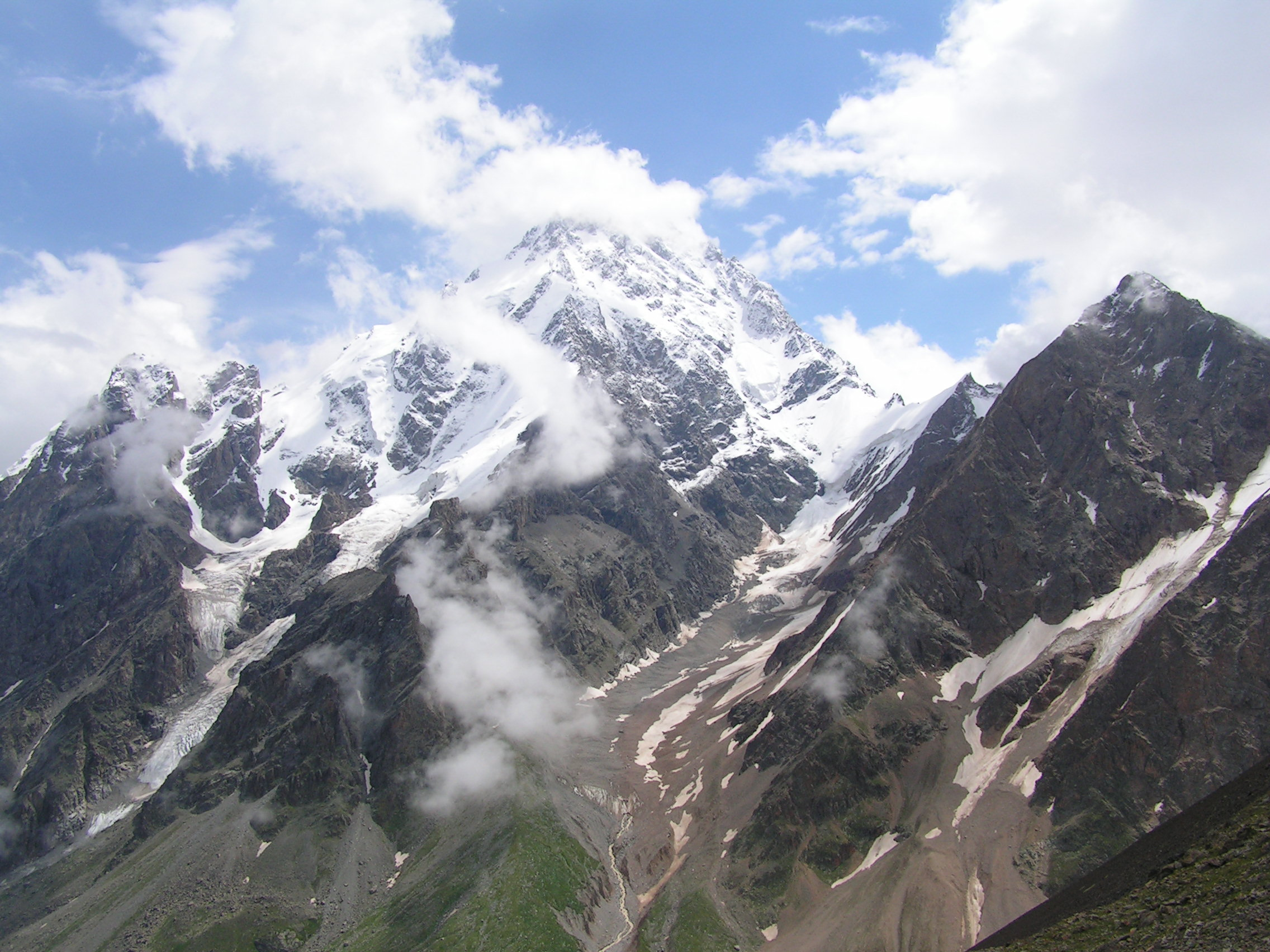
Mount Dykh-Tau

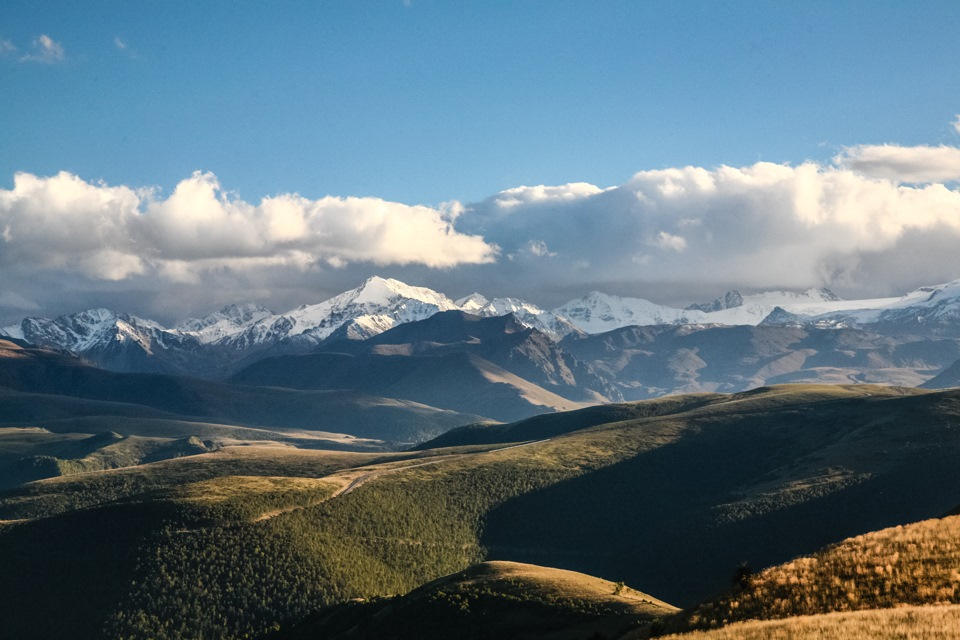
Prielbrusye

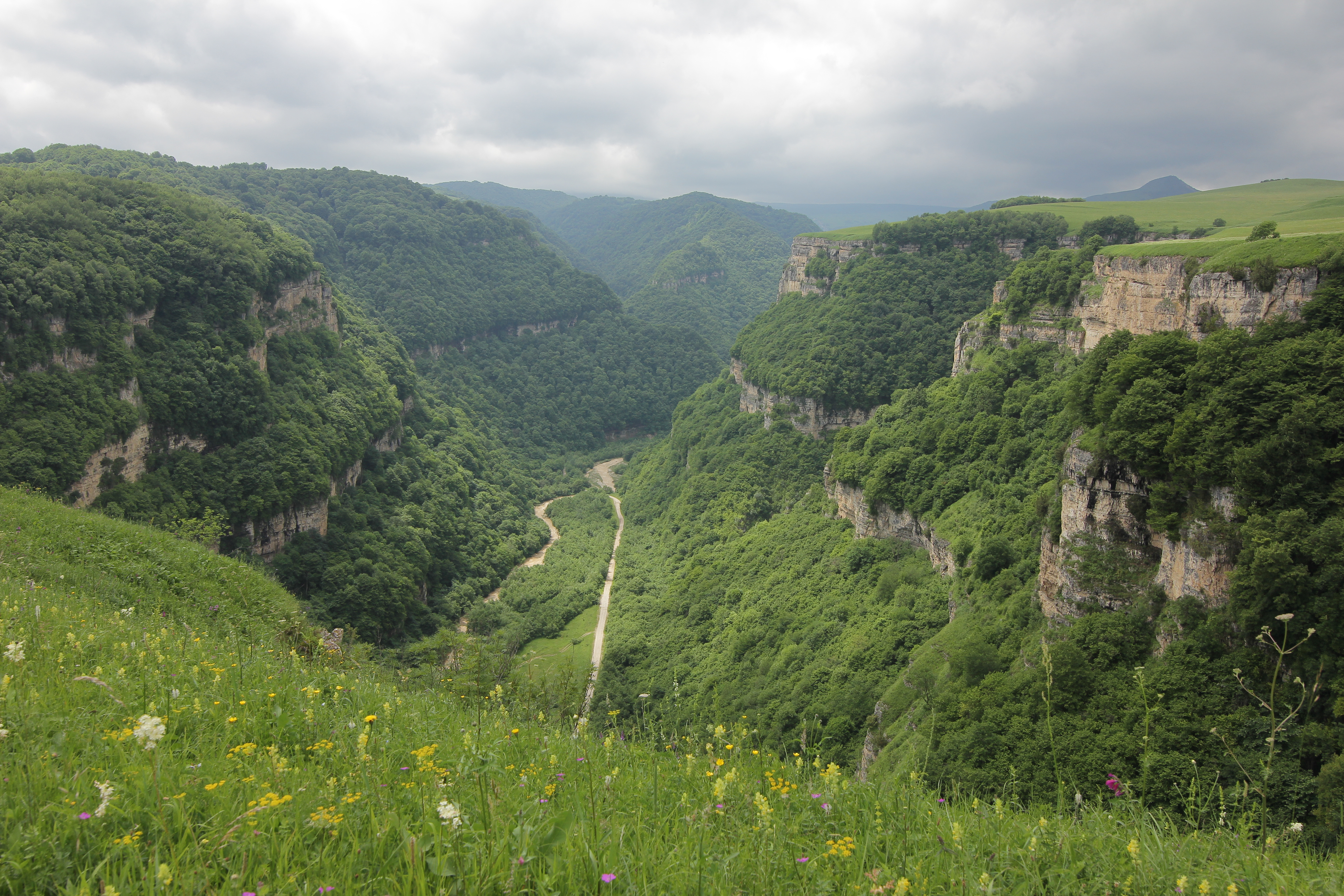
Tyzyl Gorge

== Demographics ==
Historical population
Year	Pop.	±%
1926	230,923	—
1959	420,115	+81.9%
1970	588,203	+40.0%
1979	674,605	+14.7%
1989	759,586	+12.6%
2002	901,494	+18.7%
2010	859,939	−4.6%
2021	904,200	+5.1%
2025	908,090	+0.4%
Source: Census data, estimate

Population: 904,200 (2021 census); 859,939 (2010 census); 901,494 (2002 census); 759,586 (1989 Soviet census).

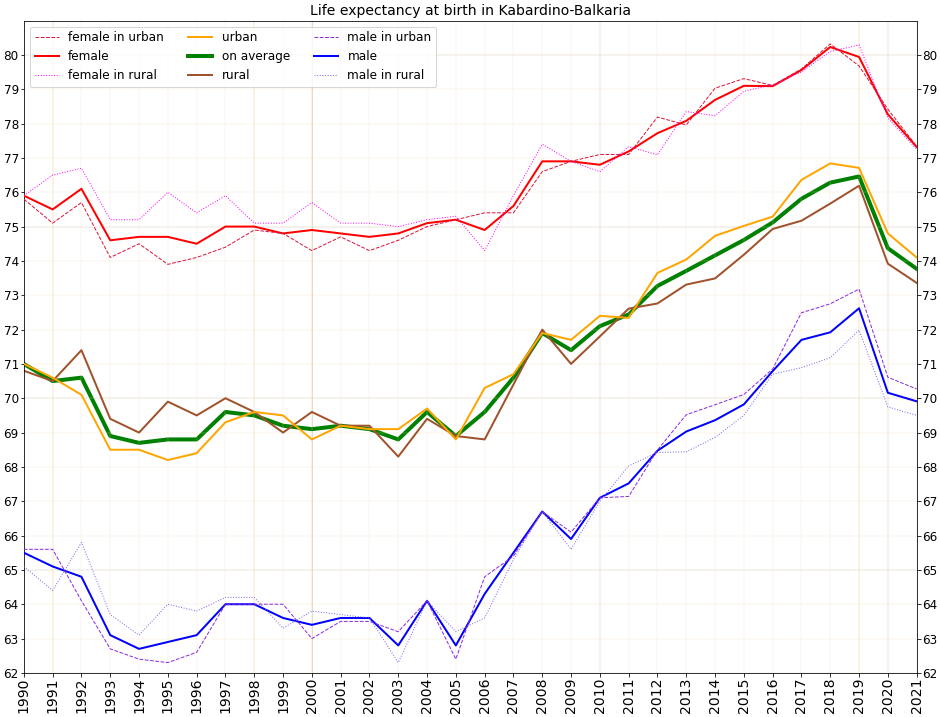
Life expectancy at birth in Kabardino-Balkaria

Life expectancy:

	2019	2021
Average:	76.5 years	73.8 years
Male:	72.6 years	69.9 years
Female:	79.9 years	77.3 years

=== Vital statistics ===
	Average population (x 1000)	Live births	Deaths	Natural change	Crude birth rate (per 1000)	Crude death rate (per 1000)	Natural change (per 1000)	Fertility rates
1970	592	11,683	3,913	7,770	19.7	6.6	13.1	
1975	634	12,315	4,717	7,598	19.4	7.4	12.0	
1980	680	14,098	5,457	8,641	20.7	8.0	12.7	
1985	725	15,941	5,854	10,087	22.0	8.1	13.9	
1990	772	15,412	6,573	8,839	20.0	8.5	11.5	2.45
1991	788	14,952	6,995	7,957	19.0	8.9	10.1	2.35
1992	799	13,728	7,093	6,635	17.2	8.9	8.3	2.16
1993	807	11,781	7,864	3,917	14.6	9.7	4.9	1.86
1994	816	11,407	8,052	3,355	14.0	9.9	4.1	1.79
1995	828	10,844	8,236	2,608	13.1	9.9	3.2	1.67
1996	840	10,293	8,199	2,094	12.2	9.8	2.5	1.56
1997	853	10,016	7,985	2,031	11.7	9.4	2.4	1.47
1998	866	9,997	8,201	1,796	11.5	9.5	2.1	1.44
1999	875	9,221	8,292	929	10.5	9.5	1.1	1.30
2000	883	9,207	8,792	415	10.4	10.0	0.5	1.26
2001	891	8,892	8,778	114	10.0	9.9	0.1	1.19
2002	897	9,119	8,954	165	10.2	10.0	0.2	1.20
2003	896	9,294	9,202	92	10.4	10.3	0.1	1.20
2004	889	9,414	8,695	719	10.6	9.8	0.8	1.22
2005	882	8,991	9,034	43	10.2	10.2	-0.0	1.13
2006	875	9,308	8,764	544	10.6	10.0	0.6	1.16
2007	870	11,397	8,441	2,956	13.1	9.7	3.4	1.41
2008	866	12,052	8,095	3,957	13.9	9.3	4.6	1.49
2009	863	12,143	8,406	3,737	14.1	9.7	4.3	1.62
2010	860	12,576	8,080	4,496	14.6	9.4	5.2	1.66
2011	860	12,848	8,136	4,712	14.9	9.4	5.5	1.70
2012	859	13,786	7,709	6,077	16.0	9.0	7.0	1.83
2013	859	13,365	7,712	5,653	15.6	9.0	6.6	1.80
2014	860	13,397	7,571	5,826	15.6	8.8	6.8	1.83
2015	861	12,627	7,582	5,045	14.6	8.8	5.8	1.75
2016	863	12,191	7,386	4,805	14.1	8.5	5.6	1.72
2017	865	11,092	7,391	3,701	12.8	8.5	4.3	1.61
2018	865	10,881	7,044	3,837	12.5	8.1	4.4	1.61
2019	866	9,973	7,142	2,831	11.5	8.2	3.3	1.51
2020		10,604	8,624	1,980	12.2	9.9	2.3	1.64
2021		10,462	9,436	1,026	12.0	10.8	1.2	1.67
2022		10,049	8,010	2,039	11.5	9.2	2.3	1.51
2023		9,941	6,827	3,114	11.0	7.5	3.5	1.53
2024		10,180	6,963	3,217	11.2	7.7	3.5	1.61

Note: TFR 2009, 2010, 2011, 2012 source.

=== Ethnic groups ===
Kabardino-Balkaria includes two major ethnic communities, the Kabardins (Circassians), who speak a North-West Caucasian language, and the Balkars who speak a Turkic language. According to the 2021 Census, Kabardins make up 57.1% of the republic's population, followed by Russians (19.8%) and Balkars (13.7%). Other groups include Cherkess (3.0%), Turks (1.9%), Ossetians (0.8%), Romani (0.5%), and a host of smaller groups, each accounting for less than 0.5% of the total population.

Ethnic group	1926 Census^{1}		1939 Census		1959 Census		1970 Census		1979 Census		1989 Census		2002 Census		2010 Census		2021 Census^{3}	
Ethnic group	Number	%	Number	%	Number	%	Number	%	Number	%	Number	%	Number	%	Number	%	Number	%
Kabardin	122,237	54.2%	152,237	42.4%	190,284	45.3%	264,675	45.0%	303,604	45.5%	364,494	48.2%	498,702^{2}	55.3%	490,453	57.2%	502,615	57.1%
Balkars	33,197	14.7%	40,747	11.3%	34,088	8.1%	51,356	8.7%	59,710	9.0%	70,793	9.4%	104,951	11.6%	108,577	12.7%	120,898	13.7%
Russians	32,622	14.5%	129,067	35.9%	162,586	38.7%	218,595	37.2%	234,137	35.1%	240,750	31.9%	226,620	25.1%	193,155	22.5%	174,768	19.8%
Ossetians	3,839	1.7%	4,608	1.3%	6,442	1.5%	9,167	1.6%	9,710	1.5%	9,996	1.3%	9,845	1.1%	9,129	1.1%	6,877	0.8%
Ukrainians	24,723	11.0%	11,142	3.1%	8,400	2.0%	10,620	1.8%	12,139	1.8%	12,826	1.7%	7,592	0.8%	4,800	0.6%	1,461	0.2%
Cherkess	8,803	3.9%	21,328	5.9%	18,315	4.4%	33,790	5.7%	47,246	7.1%	614	0.1%	725	0.1%	2,475	0.3%	26,544	3.0%
Others	8,803	3.9%	21,328	5.9%	18,315	4.4%	33,790	5.7%	47,246	7.1%	55,058	7.3%	53,059	5.9%	49,081	5.7%	47,748	5.7%
^{1} The results of the 1926 census refer to the present territory, which is a combination of the Kabardo-Balkarian AO and a part of the Terek district. The latter area was mainly inhabited by Russians and Ukrainians.^{2} In view of the results of the 1989 census and the 2010 census, the number of Kabardins in 2002 seems unlikely high.^{3} 23,289 people were registered from administrative databases, and could not declare an ethnicity. It is estimated that the proportion of ethnicities in this group is the same as that of the declared group.

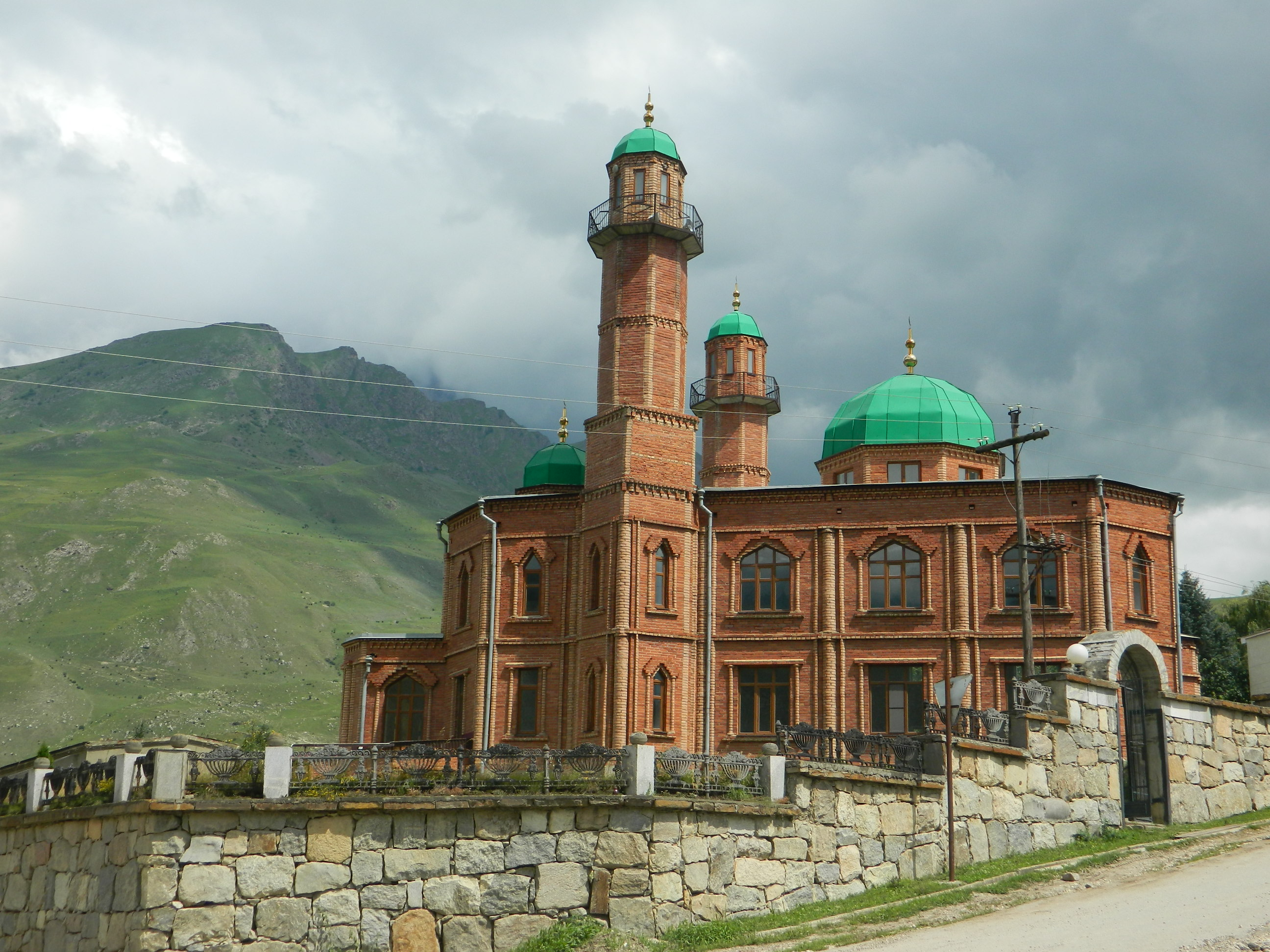
Mosque in Kabardino-Balkaria

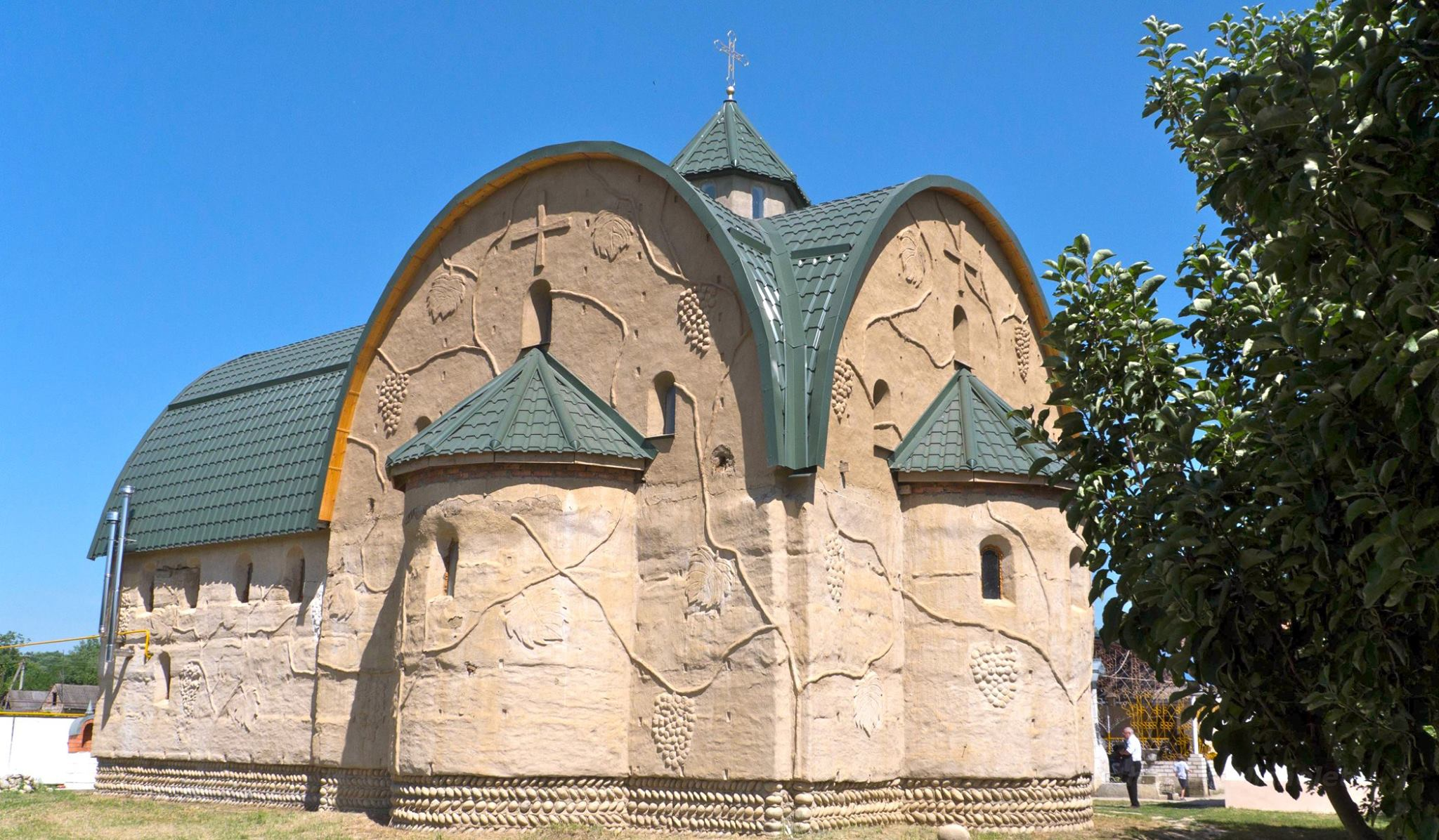
Catholic church in Kabardino-Balkaria (Diocese of Saratov, Blagoveshchenka)

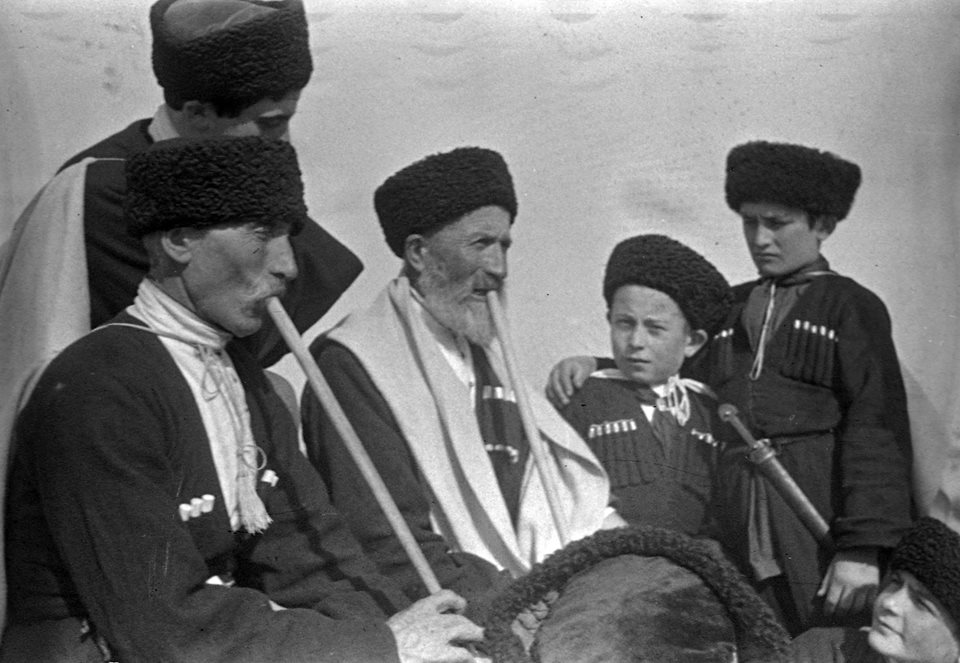
Balkars in 1936

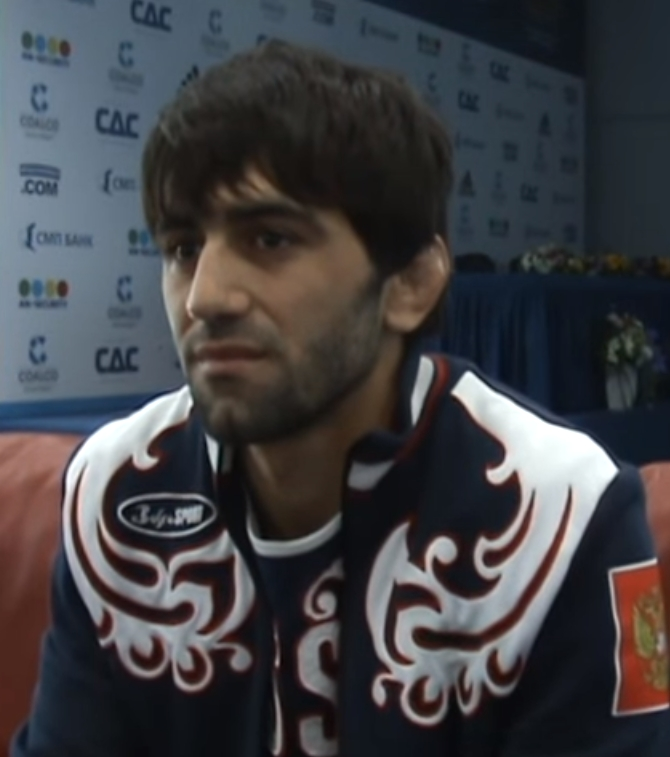
Kabardian wrestler Beslan Mudranov won Russia's first gold medal at the Rio 2016 Olympics

=== Religion ===
Religion in Kabardino-Balkaria as of 2012 (Sreda Arena Atlas)
Islam	70.8%
Russian Orthodoxy	11.6%
Other Christians	4%
Native faiths	1.8%
Spiritual but not religious	5.6%
Atheism and irreligion	4.4%
Other and undeclared	1.8%

According to a 2012 survey which interviewed 56,900 people, 70.8% of the population of Kabardino-Balkaria adhered to Islam, 11.6% to the Russian Orthodox Church, 3.8% were non-Orthodox Christians, and 1.8% followed Adyghe (Kabardian) folk religion and other indigenous faiths. In addition, 5.6% of the population declared to be "spiritual but not religious" and 4.4% was atheist or followed other religions, including Jehovah's Witnesses.

== See also ==
- Caucasian Avars
- Bulgars
- List of chairmen of the Parliament of the Kabardino-Balkar Republic
- Minor hydro-electric plants of Kabardino-Balkaria
- Mount Imeon

== Sources ==
- Bell, Imogen (2003). The Territories of the Russian Federation 2003. Europa Publications. ISBN 1-85743-191-X.
- Совет Республики Парламента Кабардино-Балкарской Республики. Закон №13-РЗ от 4 августа 1994 г. «О государственном гимне Кабардино-Балкарской Республики», в ред. Закона №13-РЗ от 13 апреля 2015 г «О внесении изменений в статьи 2 и 4 Закона Кабардино-Балкарской Республики "О государственном гимне Кабардино-Балкарской Республики"». Вступил в силу 18 августа 1994 г. Опубликован: "Кабардино-Балкарская правда", №148, 12 августа 1994 г. (Council of the Republic of the Parliament of the Kabardino-Balkarian Republic. Law #13-RZ of 4 August 1994 On the State Anthem of the Kabardino-Balkarian Republic, as amended by the Law #13-RZ of 13 April 2015 On Amending Articles 2 and 4 of the Law of the Kabardino-Balkarian Republic "On the State Anthem of the Kabardino-Balkarian Republic". Effective as of 18 August 1994.).
- Парламент Кабардино-Балкарской Республики. №28-РЗ 1 сентября 1997 г. «Конституция Кабардино-Балкарской Республики», в ред. Закона №40-РЗ от 19 октября 2015 г. «О поправках к Конституции Кабардино-Балкарской Республики». Вступил в силу со дня официального опубликования. Опубликован: "Кабардино-Балкарская правда", №177, 9 сентября 1997 г. (Parliament of the Kabardino-Balkarian Republic. #28-RZ September 1, 1997 Constitution of the Kabardino-Balkarian Republic, as amended by the Law #40-RZ of October 19, 2015 On the Amendments to the Constitution of the Kabardino-Balkarian Republic. Effective as of the day of the official publication.).
- Дударев, В. А.; Евсеева, Н. А. (1987). И. Каманина (ed.). СССР. Административно-территориальное деление союзных республик (in Russian). Moscow.
