= List of chairmen of the Parliament of the Kabardino-Balkar Republic =

The chairman of the Parliament of Kabardino-Balkaria is the presiding officer of that legislature.

== Chairmen of the Supreme Soviet ==
Name	Period
Valery Kokin	March 30, 1990–September 17, 1991
Khachim Karmokhov	September 17, 1991–1993

== Chairman of the Council of the Republic ==
Name	Period
Zaurbi Nakhushev	December 1993 – 2003 ?

== Chairmen of the Council of Representatives ==
Name	Period
Makhmud Zhaboyev	December 1993–1997
Ilyas Bechelov	December 14, 1997–2001 ?
Mukadin Tumenov	2001 ?–2003 ?

== Chairmen of the Parliament of the Kabardino-Balkar Republic ==
Name	Period
Ilyas Becheleov	December 2003–2009
Anuar Chechenov	2009–Incumbent
