= Cherek =

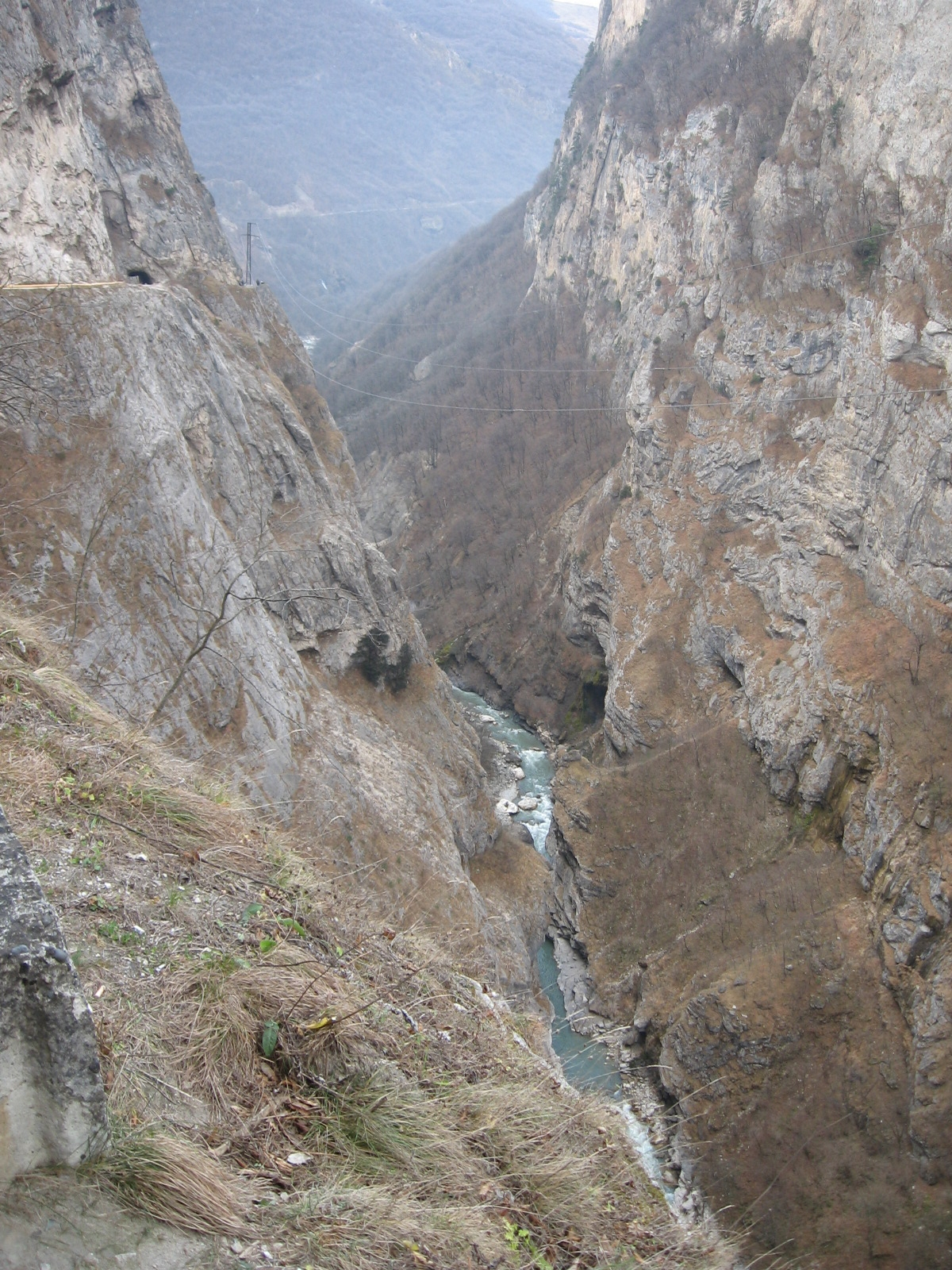
- Cherek Narrows

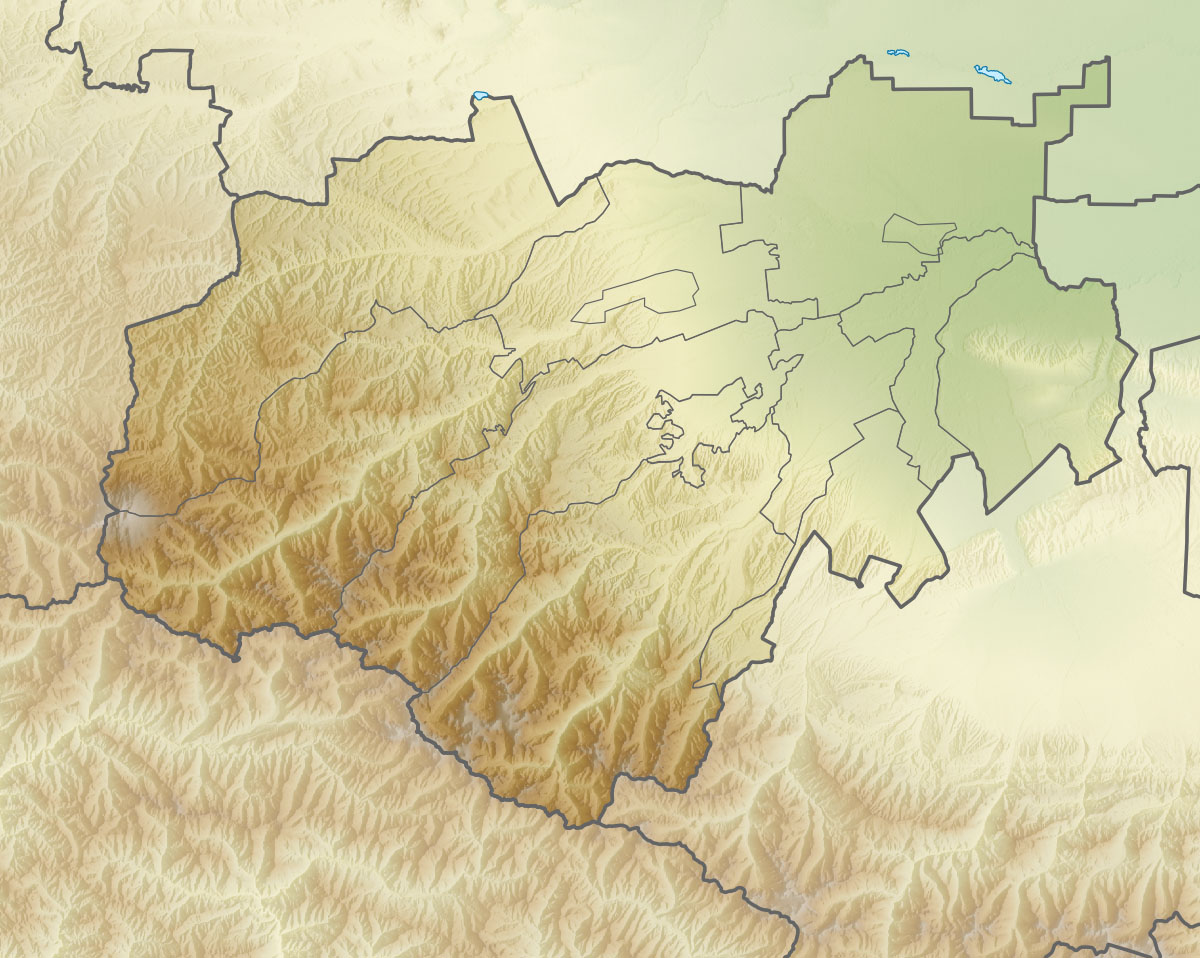
- Location within Kabardino-Balkaria Location within Caucasus Mountains

Location
- Country: Kabardino-Balkaria (Russia)

Physical characteristics
- Source
  - location: Greater Caucasus
- Mouth: Baksan
  - coordinates: 43.7004°N 44.0506°E
- Length: 79 km (49 mi)
- Basin size: 3,070 km^{2} (1,190 sq mi)

Basin features
- Progression: Baksan→ Malka→ Terek→ Caspian Sea

The Cherek (Russian: Черек) is a river in Kabardino-Balkaria in Russia, a right tributary of the Baksan (Terek basin). The Cherek is 79 kilometres (49 mi) long and drains a basin of 3,070 square kilometres (1,190 mi^{2}). The Cherek is formed by the confluence of the Cherek-Balkarsky and Cherek-Khulamsky, both of which originate in the glaciers of the northern slopes of the Greater Caucasus, one of them being the Bezengi Glacier. The river Nalchik flows into the Urvan, which is a branch of the Cherek.

== Gallery ==
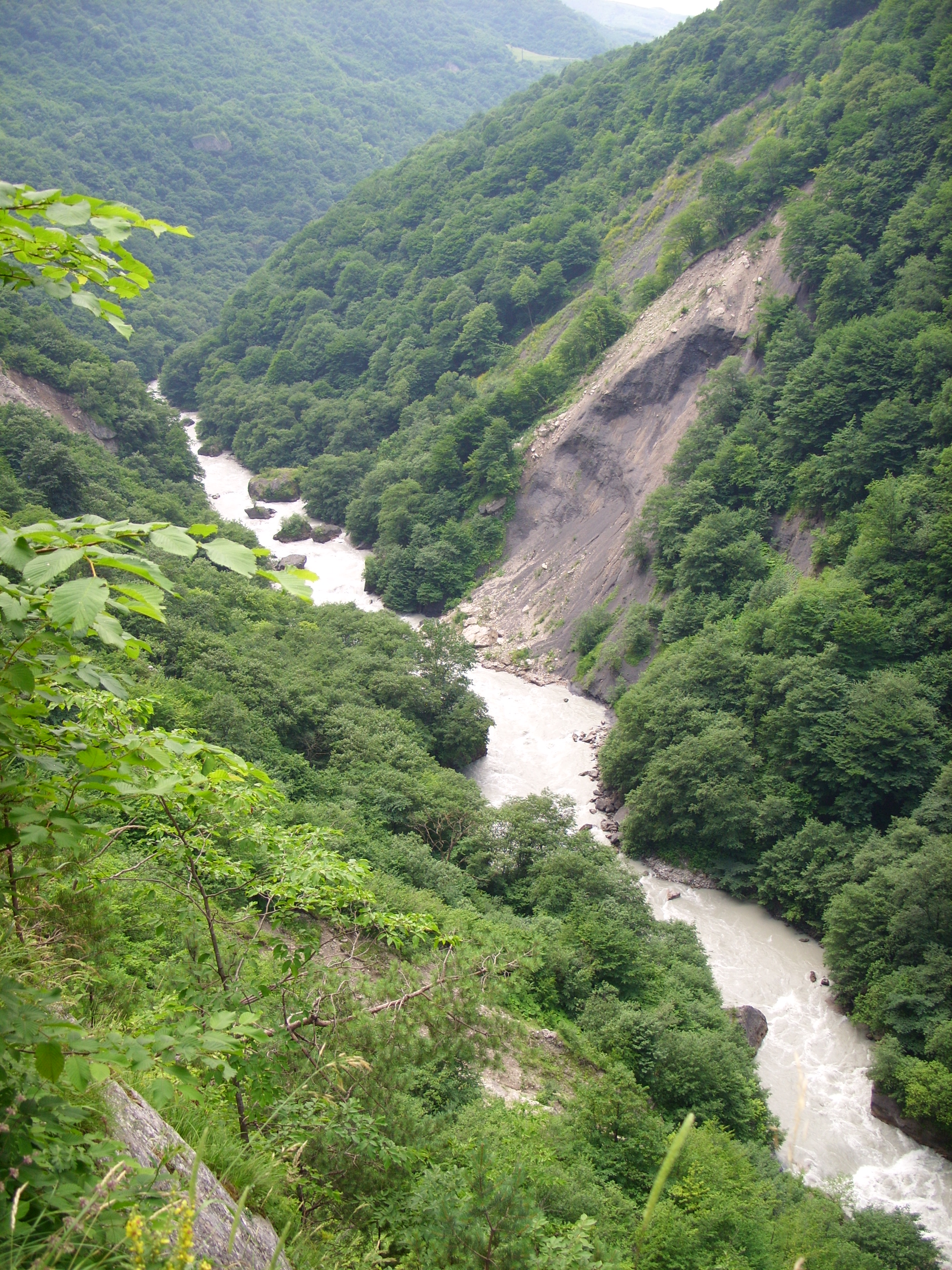
Cherek. July 2009

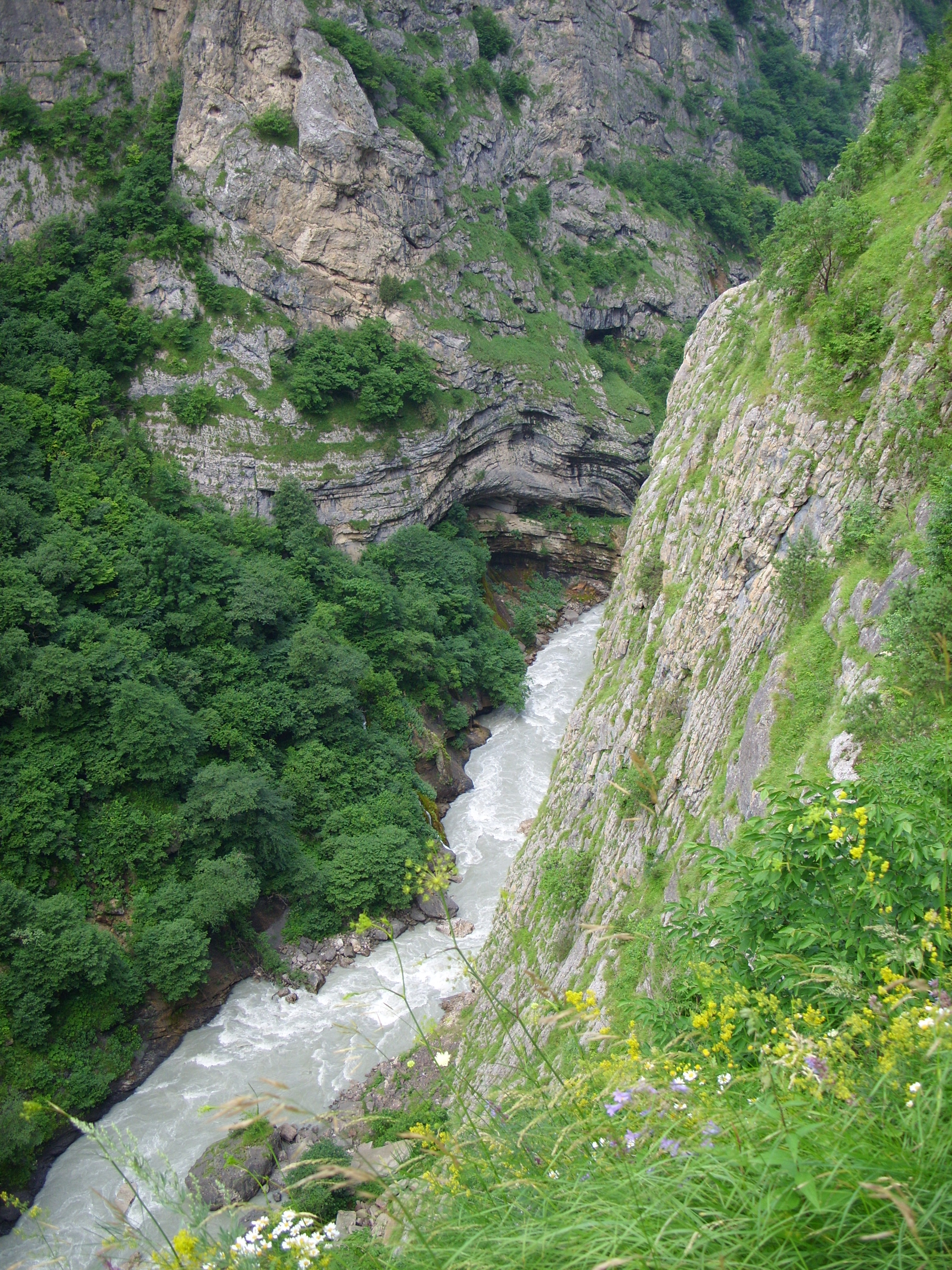
Cherek. July 2009

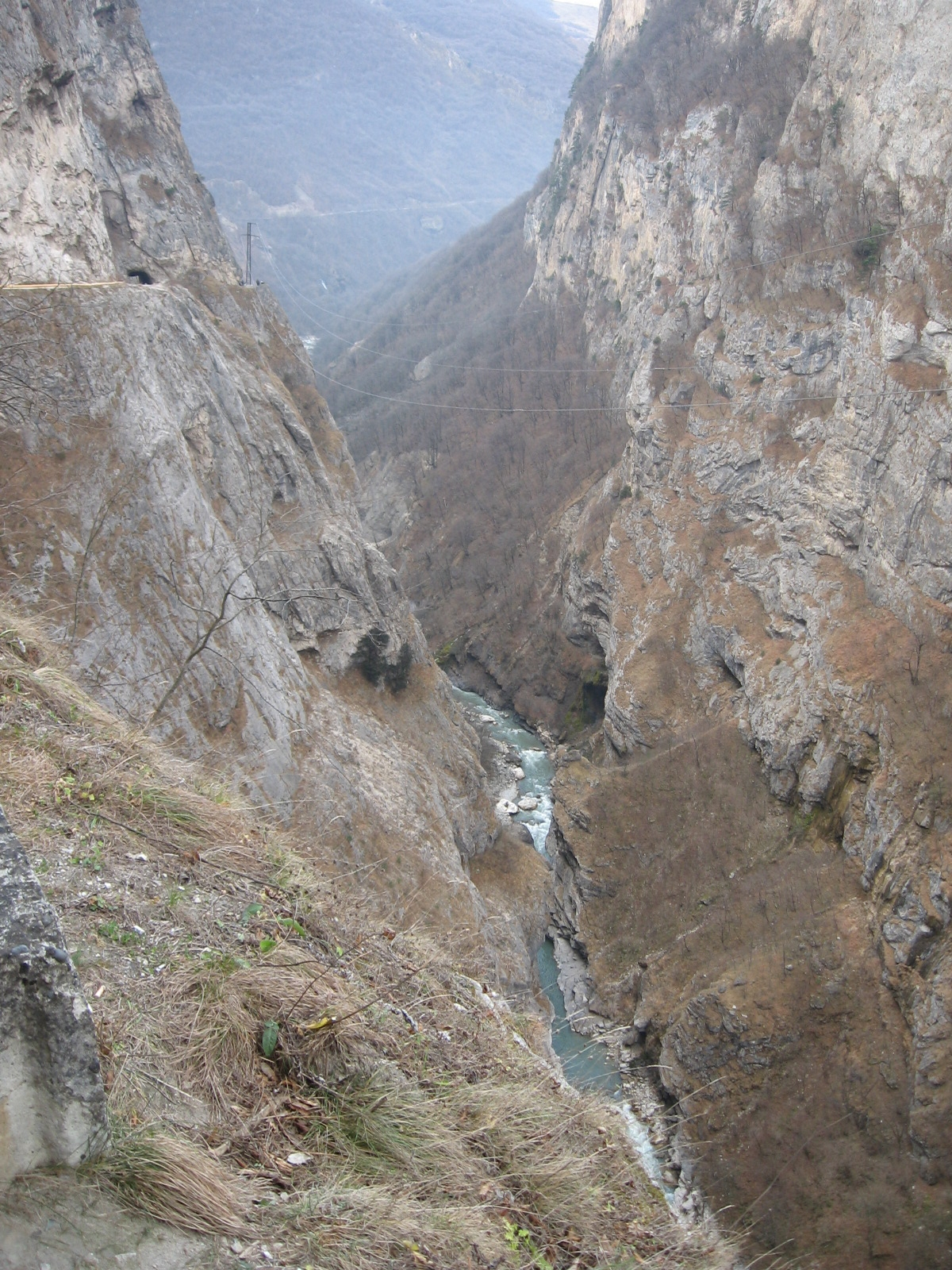
Cherek. July 2009

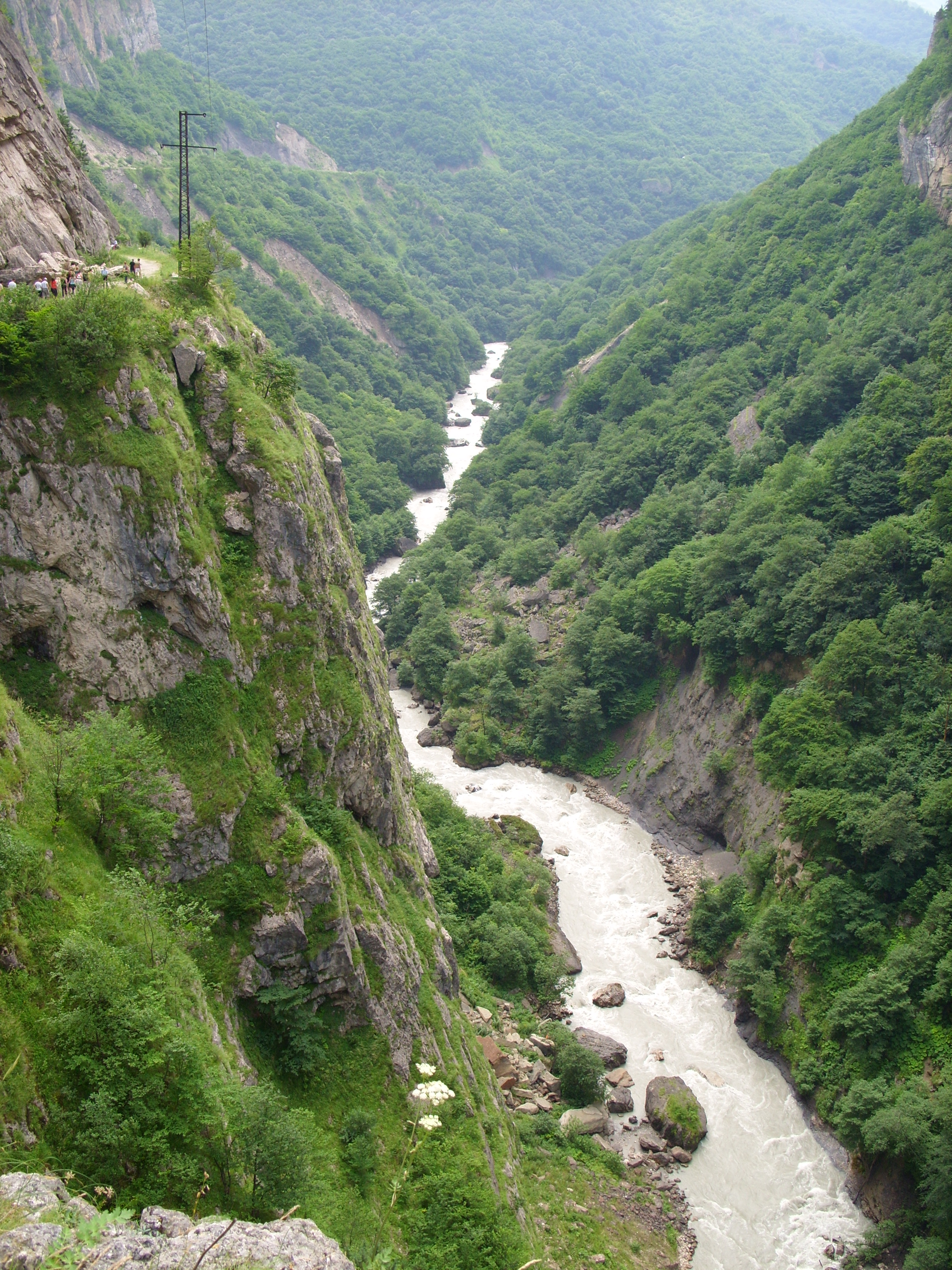
Cherek. July 2009
