= Prokhladny =

Prokhladny (Russian: Прохла́дный; masculine), Prokhladnaya (Прохла́дная; feminine), or Prokhladnoye (Прохла́дное; neuter) is the name of several inhabited localities in Russia.

Urban localities

- Prokhladny, Kabardino-Balkar Republic, a town in the Kabardino-Balkar Republic; 43°46′N 44°3′E

Rural localities

- Prokhladny, Labinsk, Krasnodar Krai, a settlement under the administrative jurisdiction of the Town of Labinsk in Krasnodar Krai; 44°43′N 40°42′E
- Prokhladny, Krymsky District, Krasnodar Krai, a khutor in Moldavansky Rural Okrug of Krymsky District in Krasnodar Krai; 44°58′N 37°48′E
- Prokhladny, Krasnoyarsk Krai, a settlement in Kanifolninsky Selsoviet of Nizhneingashsky District in Krasnoyarsk Krai
- Prokhladny, Sverdlovsk Oblast, a settlement in Kosulinsky Selsoviet of Beloyarsky District in Sverdlovsk Oblast
- Prokhladny, Voronezh Oblast, a khutor in Yudanovskoye Rural Settlement of Bobrovsky District in Voronezh Oblast
- Prokhladnoye, Slavsky District, Kaliningrad Oblast, a settlement in Yasnovsky Rural Okrug of Slavsky District in Kaliningrad Oblast
- Prokhladnoye, Zelenogradsky District, Kaliningrad Oblast, a settlement in Pereslavsky Rural Okrug of Zelenogradsky District in Kaliningrad Oblast
- Prokhladnoye, Primorsky Krai, a selo in Nadezhdinsky District of Primorsky Krai
- Prokhladnoye, Smolensk Oblast, a village in Gusinskoye Rural Settlement of Krasninsky District in Smolensk Oblast
