= State Anthem of Kabardino-Balkaria =

Gosudarstvenny gimn Kabardino-Balkarii
English: State Anthem of Kabardino-Balkaria
- Государственный гимн Кабардино-Балкарии
- Regional anthem of Kabardino-Balkaria, Russia
- Lyrics: Anatoly Bitsuev and Pyotr Kazharov (Russian version); Boris Gedgafov (Kabardian version)
- Music: Khasan Kardanov
- Adopted: 1992

Audio sample
- Official band instrumental recording: file; help

The State Anthem of Kabardino-Balkaria (Note: Russian: Государственный гимн Кабардино-Балкарии, romanized: Gosudarstvennyj gimn Kabardino-Balkarii; Kabardian: Къэбэрдей-Балъкъэр Республикэ и Къэрал Орэдыр, romanized: Qəbərdej-Bałqər Respublikə i Qəral Orədyr; Karachay-Balkar: Къабарты-Малкъар Республиканы гимни, romanized: Qabartı-Malqar Respublikanı gimni) was composed by Khasan Kardanov in 1992.

== History ==
Khasan Kardanov won a competition to select the music of the anthem of Kabardino-Balkaria with a composition based on the intonations and colours of Kabardian, Balkar and Russian folk songs. A commission was then established to select lyrics for the anthem.

In 2000, the Parliament of Kabardino-Balkaria announced the completion of its work and promised to approve lyrics by the end of the year; however, no lyrics were ever officially approved, despite contributions by poets Zuber Tkhagazitov (Kabardian); Magomet Mokaev, Salih Gurtuevru and Akhmat Sozaev (Balkar); Georgy Yaropolsky (Russian); lawyer Igor Tsavkilov (Russian); editor-in-chief of Nur magazine Boris Gedgafov (Russian and Kabardian); and editor of the Elbrus publishing house Anatoly Bitsuev and songwriter Pyotr Kazharov (Russian).

== Lyrics ==
=== Common Russian version ===
Russian original

Под ясным небом расцветая,
Живёшь (Note: Растёшь ('You grow up') is also used.) ты, родина отцов.
Наш общий дом — земля святая, (Note: Sometimes sung as «Ты наша жизнь, ты мать родная» ('You're our life, you're our dear mother').)
Надежда, гордость и любовь. (Note: Sometimes sung as «Ты наша гордость и любовь» ('You're our pride and love').)

Припев:
Цвети, республика родная,
Сияй на долгие года. (Note: Sometimes sung as «Цветите села, города» ('May villages and towns stand in bloom').)
Ты, Кабардино-Балкария,
Край мира, солнца и труда.

Давно нам предки завещали
Народам нашим в дружбе жить
Судьбой своей мы доказали,
Что эту дружбу не сломить.

Припев

Народы ты объединила,
Вершина братства – твой Эльбрус.
В твоем единстве – наша сила, (Note: Sometimes sung as «С тобою вместе – наша сила» ('We're with you forever, our might').)
С тобой навеки – наша Русь. (Note: Sometimes sung as «С тобою вместе – наша Русь» ('We're with you forever, our land of Russia').)

Припев

Karachay-Balkar

Жарыкъ кюнде чагъыу
Ёсесесе, Ата журтум.
Сен бизни жашауубузса, сен туугъан анаса
Сен бизни ёхтемлигибиз эм сюймеклигибиз.

Эжиу:
Гокка хансла, туугъан республика,
Чагъыгъыз эллени, шахарланы.
Сен алай Къабарты-Малкъарымса,
Саламны, кюнню, урунууну да къыйыры.

Атала бизге эртте осияты этген эдиле
Халкъыбызгъа шуёхлукъда жашаргъа
Жазыуубуз бла ийнанабыз,
Бу шуёхлукъну бузаргъа мадар бармыды.

Эжиу

Миллетлени бирикдирдинг,
Къарнашлыгъынгы башындагъы Минги тау.
Сени бла биргед къарыуубуз,
Санга къошулгъанлыкъгъа бизни Эресей.

Эжиу

English translation

You blossom under the bright sun,
You live on, homeland of our fathers.
The home we share, our holy land,
You are our hope, pride and love.

Chorus:
Blossom, our dear republic,
Shine on for many years.
You, Kabardino-Balkaria,
Are the land of peace, sun and toil.

Long ago our forebears bequeathed to us
A nation to live in amity.
By destiny we have proven
That this friendship can't be broken.

Chorus

You have united the people,
Your Elbrus – the peak of brotherhood.
Our might is in your unity,
Our Rus' is with you forever.

Chorus

=== Versions by Boris Gedgafov ===
Kabardian version (by Boris Gedgafov)

I
Ди лъахэ дахэ, ди Хэку дыгъэ,
Псэм пэтщӀу Къэбэрдей-Балъкъэр!
Къуитащ уэ Тхьэшхуэм лъапӀэныгъэ,
УобжьыфӀэ, Къэбэрдей-Балъкъэр!

Ежьу:
ЕфӀакӀуэ, гъагъэ, ди щӀыгу махуэ,
Адэжь щӀыналъэ, ди дуней!
Насып дамыгъэщ Ӏуащхьэмахуэ,
Ди Хэкужь уардэ, щӀыхькӀэ бей!

II
Лъэпкъ зэныбжьэгъухэм инщ я гуащӀэр,
Адэжь уэсятхэр догъэпэж.
Зэкъуэтыныгъэм еузэщӀ гъащӀэр,
Дехъунщ псэукӀэр нэхъ дахэж.

Ежьу

III
Уэ уегъэлъэщыр мамырыгъэм,
ДоӀыгъ къуэшыгъэр Урысейм.
И гъуазэ нуркъэ ар уи лӀыгъэм,
КъэкӀуэну дахэ уи пщэдейм!

Ежьу

Russian translation (Translated by Boris Gedgafov)

I
Священный край наш, край любимый,
Кабардино-Балкария!
Тобой горды, сильны страной мы,
Кабардино-Балкария!

Припев:
Цвети и славься ты, Отчизна,
Крепи единство, мир святой!
Эльбрус могучий – символ жизни,
Народов дружных дом родной!

II
Земля отцов, ты величава,
Надежда, сила, наша честь.
Нас озаряет предков слава,
Твоей нам доблести не счесть.

Припев

III
Давно с Россией побратимы,
Прошли сквозь годы бед – побед.
Свободы путь неповторимый –
Вовек народам солнца свет!

Припев

BGN/PCGN Romanization

I
Svyashchennyy kray nash, kray lyubimyy,
Kabardino-Balkariya!
Toboy gordy, sil'ny stranoy my,
Kabardino-Balkariya!

Pripev:
Tsveti i slav'sya ty, Otchizna,
Krepi yedinstvo, mir svyatoy!
El'brus moguchiy – simvol zhizni,
Narodov druzhnykh dom rodnoy!

II
Zemlya ottsov, ty velichava,
Nadezhda, sila, nasha chest'.
Nas ozaryayet predkov slava,
Tvoyey nam doblesti ne schest'.

Pripev

III
Davno s Rossiyey pobratimy,
Proshli skvoz' gody bed – pobed.
Svobody put' nepovtorimyy –
Vovek narodam solntsa svet!

Pripev

English translation

I
Our sacred land, our beloved land,
Kabardino-Balkaria!
We are proud of you, we are a strong country,
Kabardino-Balkaria!

Chorus:
Blossom and be glorified, Fatherland,
Strengthen unity, holy world!
Mighty Elbrus is a symbol of life,
The home of friendly peoples!

II
Land of fathers, you are majestic,
Hope, strength, our honor.
The glory of our ancestors illuminates us,
Your valor is countless for us.

Chorus

III
We have long been brothers with Russia,
We have gone through years of troubles - victories.
The unique path of freedom -
Forever the light of the sun to the peoples!

Chorus
