= Malka (river) =

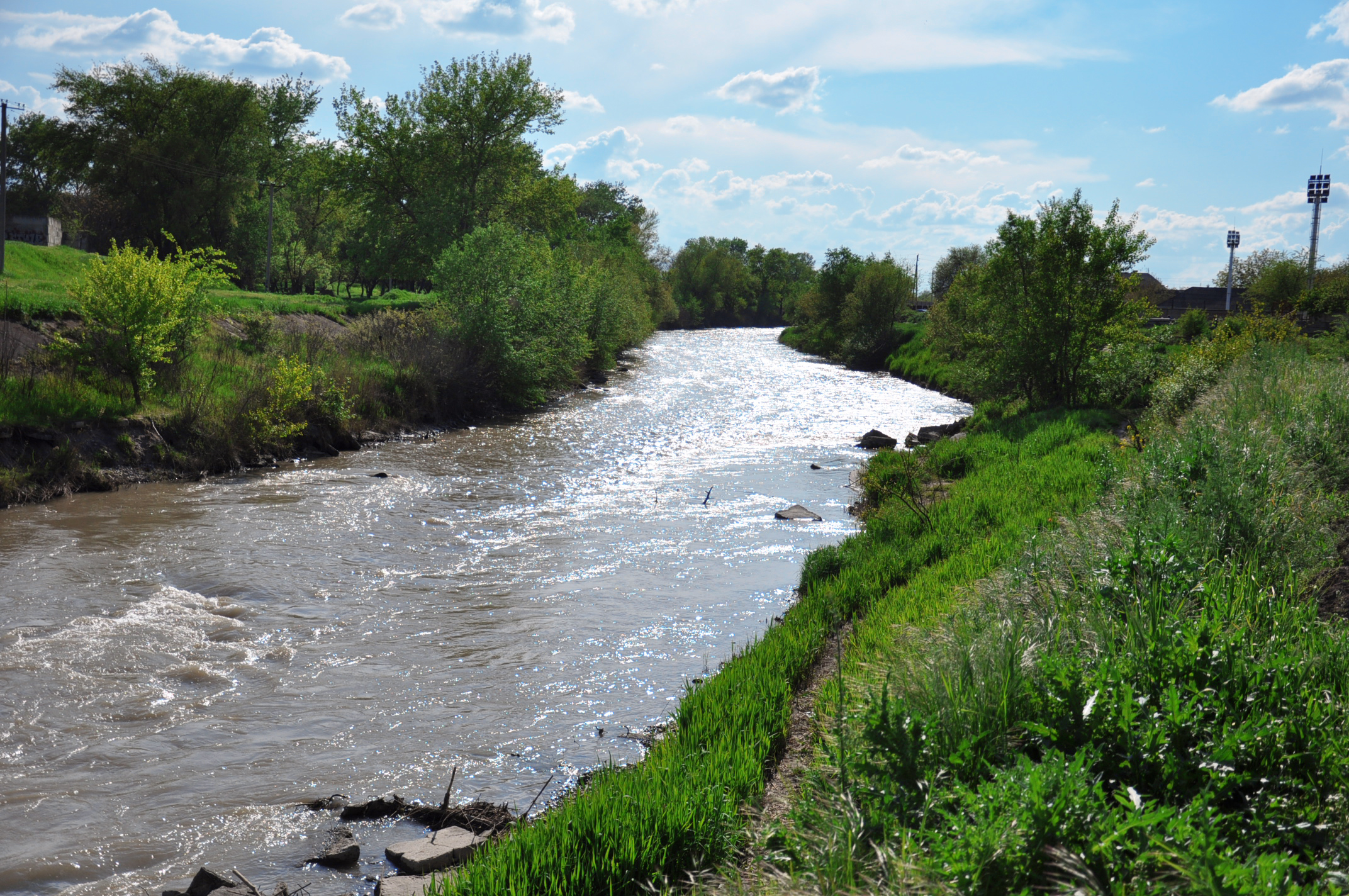

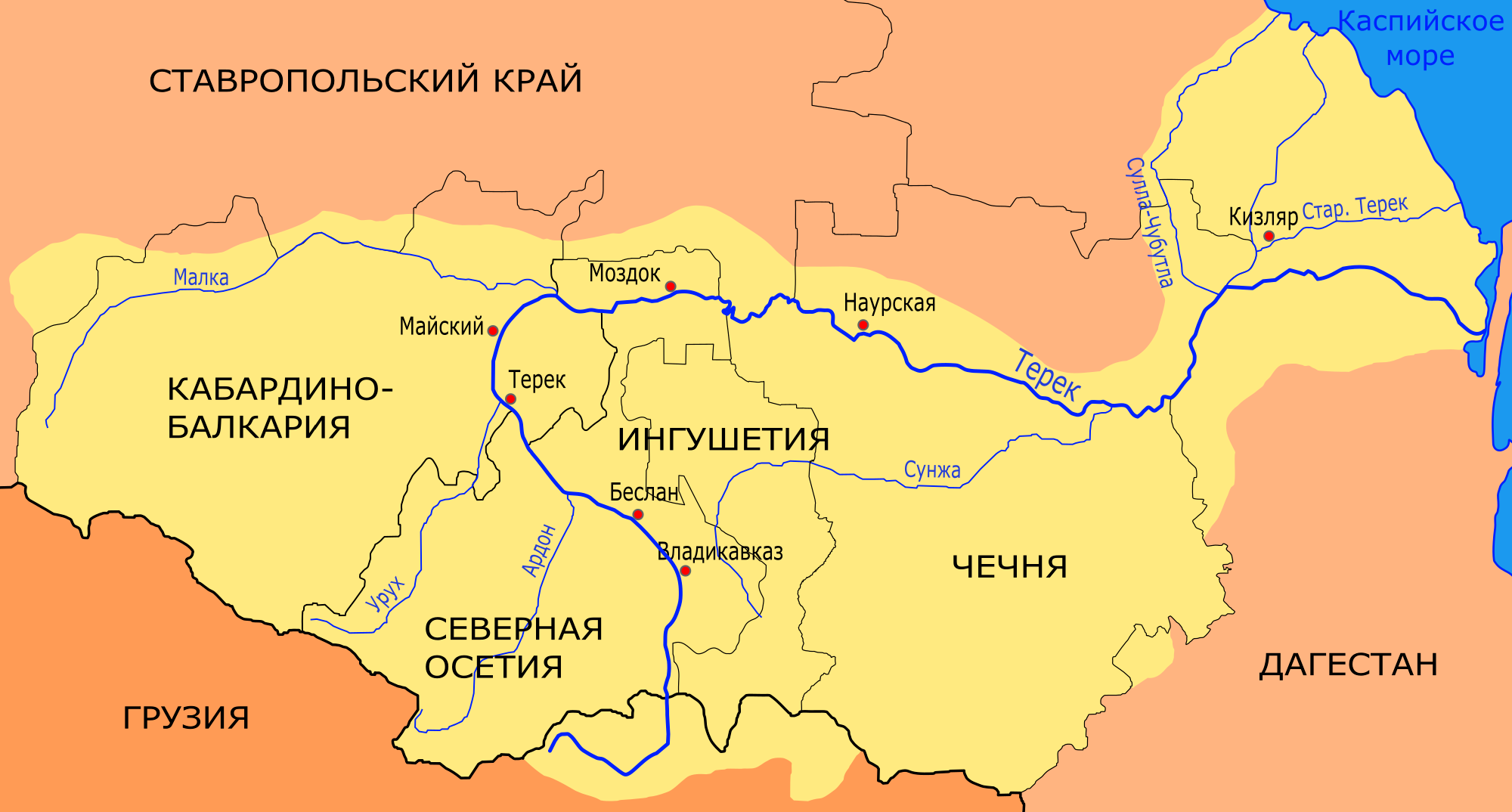
- The Malka is the long northwest tributary of the Terek River

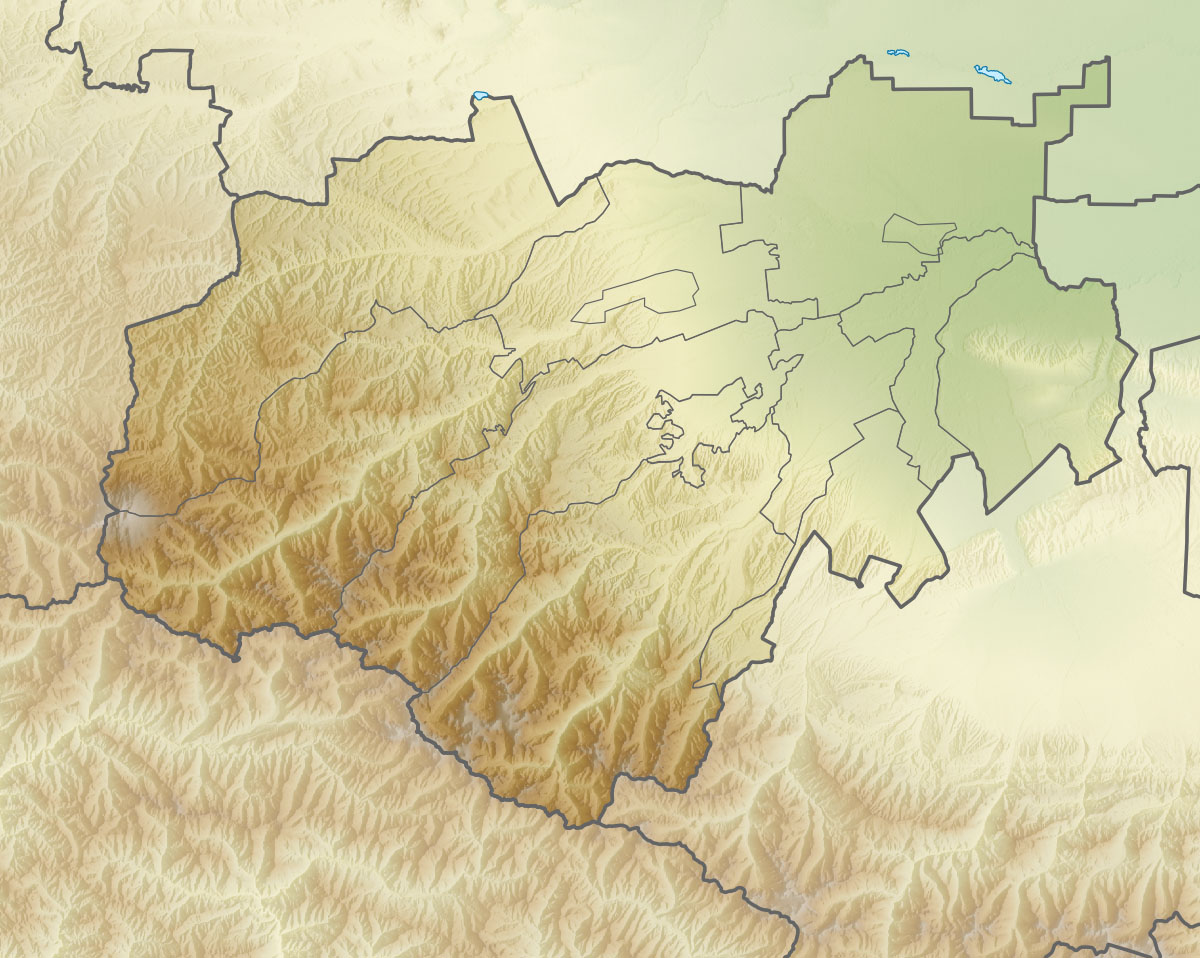
- Location within Kabardino-Balkaria Location within Caucasus Mountains

Location
- Country: Kabardino-Balkaria (Russia)

Physical characteristics
- Source: Mount Elbrus
  - location: Greater Caucasus
- Mouth: Terek
  - coordinates: 43.7316°N 44.2727°E
- Length: 210 km (130 mi)
- Basin size: 10,000 km^{2} (3,900 sq mi)

Basin features
- Progression: Terek→ Caspian Sea

The Malka (Russian: Малка), also known as Balyksu (Russian: Балыксу), is a river in Kabardino-Balkaria in Russia, which forms the northwest part of the Terek basin. It is 210 kilometres (130 mi) long, and its drainage basin covers 10,000 square kilometres (3,900 mi^{2}). The Malka originates in the glaciers on the northern slopes of Mount Elbrus, flows north and then east. Near the point where it joins the great northwest bend of the Terek it receives several northeast-flowing rivers such as the Baksan. The town of Prokhladny is along the Malka.
