= Baksan (river) =

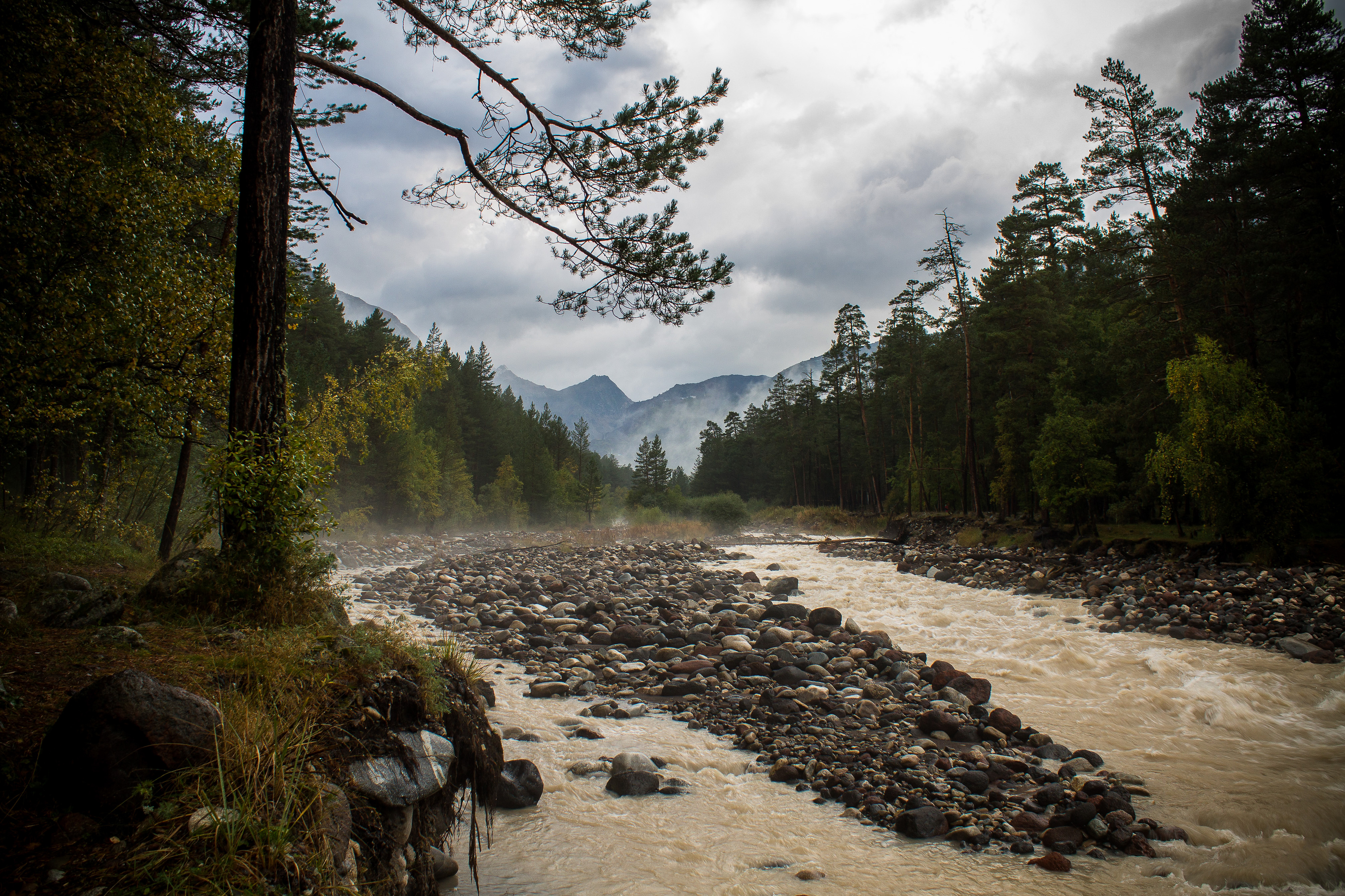

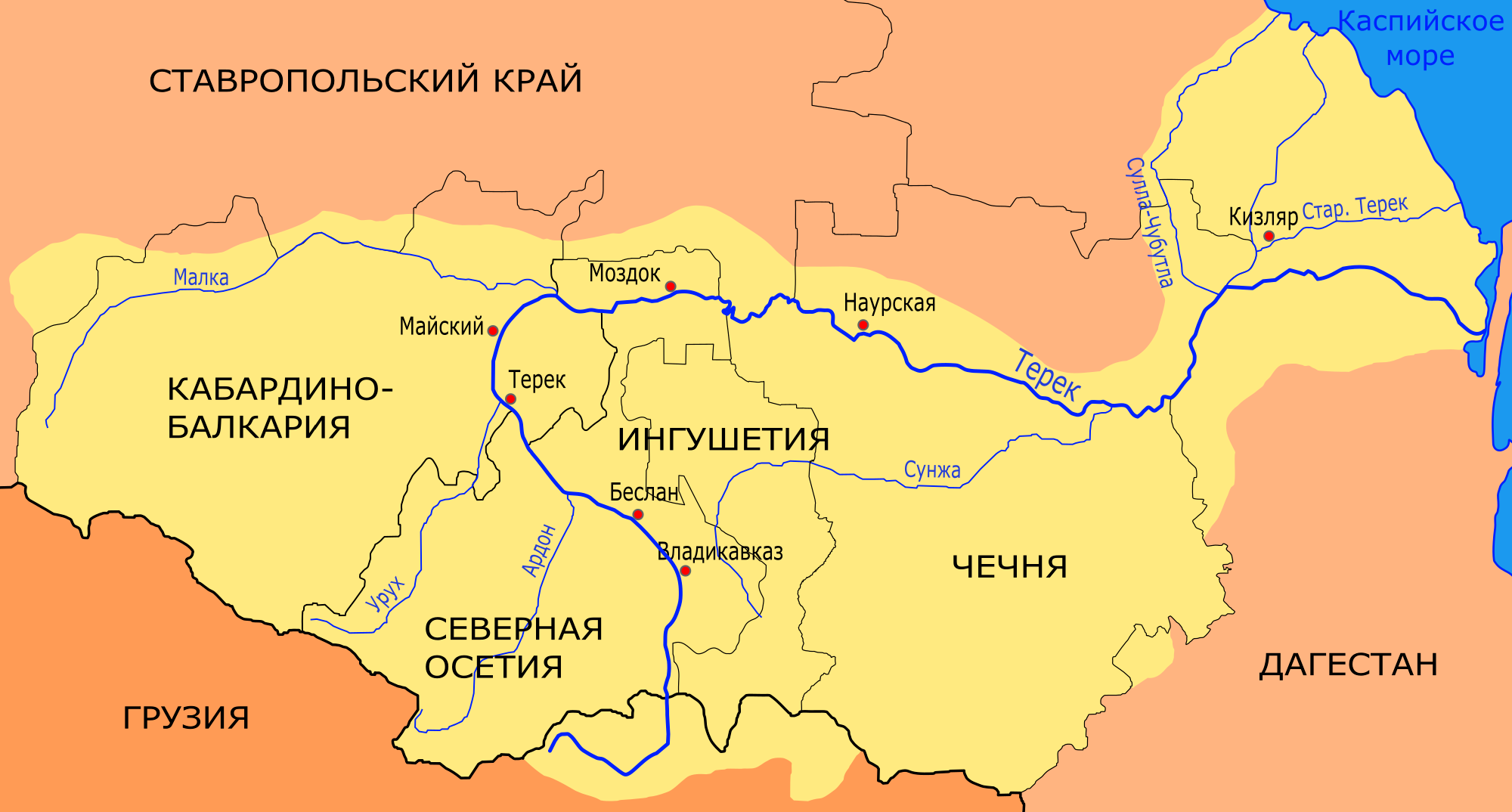

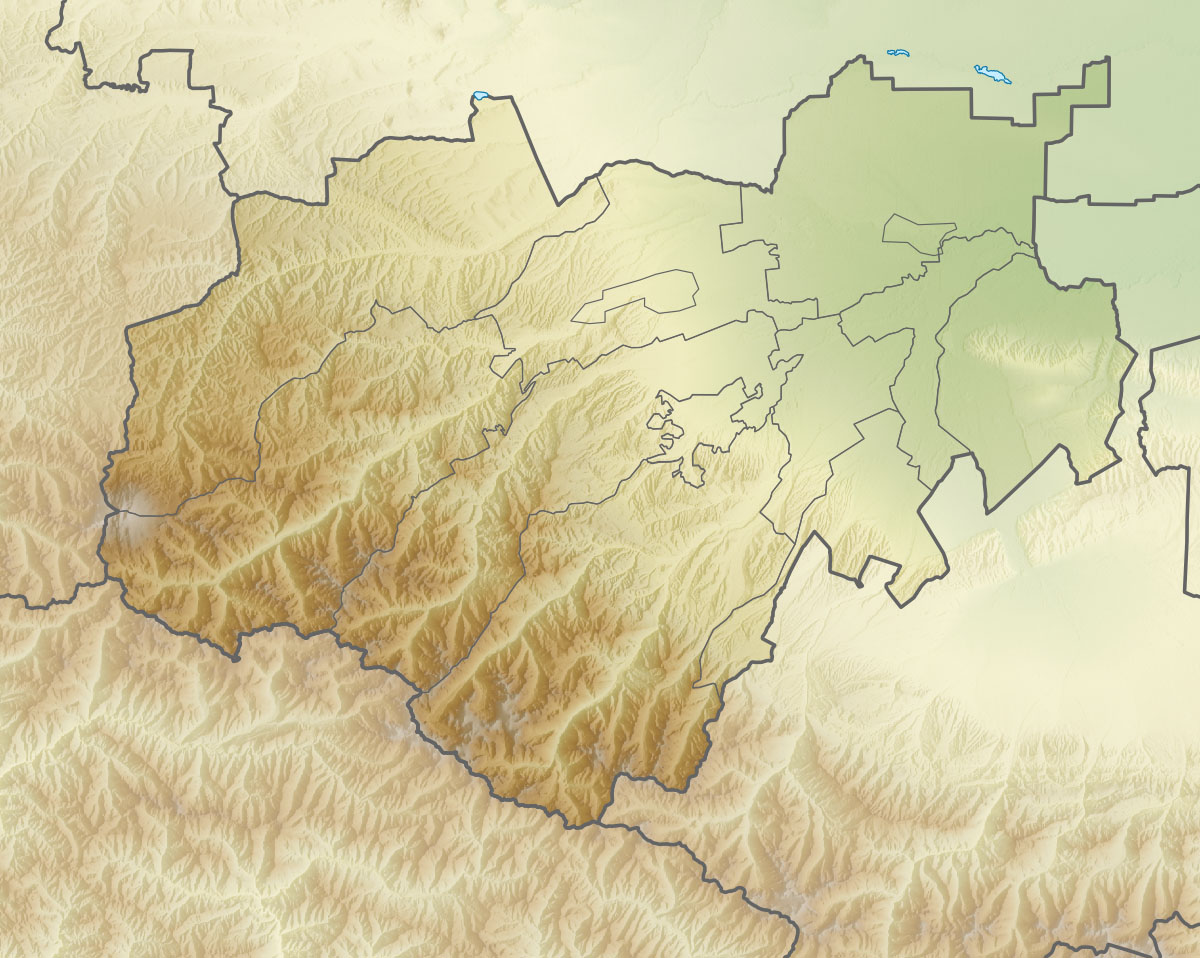
- Baksan mouth location Baksan (river) (Caucasus Mountains)

Location
- Country: Kabardino-Balkaria (Russia)

Physical characteristics
- Source: Lateral Range; Mount Elbrus
  - location: Greater Caucasus
- Mouth: Malka
  - coordinates: 43.7331°N 44.0633°E
- Length: 169 km (105 mi)
- Basin size: 6,800 km^{2} (2,600 sq mi)

Basin features
- Progression: Malka→ Terek→ Caspian Sea

The Baksan (Note: Russian: Баксан, pronounced [bɐkˈsan]; Kabardian: Бэхъсэн, romanized: Bexsen, pronounced [bɜχˈsɜn]; Karachay-Balkar: Басхан, romanized: Bashan, pronounced [bɑsˈχɑn]) (/bɑːkˈsɑːn/) is a river in Kabardino-Balkaria in Russia. It flows east northeast and joins the Malka just before that river joins the northwest bend of the Terek. The Baksan is 169 kilometres (105 mi) long, with a drainage basin of 6,800 square kilometres (2,600 mi^{2}).

== Course ==
The Baksan River is a 169 km long river with a catchment area of 6800 km². It originates from the glaciers Azau Bolshoi and Azau Maly in the Elbrus region and its food source is mainly glacial, snow and underground. The river experiences high water levels during July and August.

The Baksan River has several notable tributaries, the largest of which are the Cherek and Chegem rivers, which merge into the Baksan just upstream from its confluence with the Malka River. In the upper reaches of the Baksan and its tributaries, there are several climbing camps such as Baksan, Dzhan-Tuugan, and Elbrus, as well as the Elbrus National Park and the Terskol Observatory.

The cities of Tyrnyauz and Baksan are located along the Baksan River, while the city of Prokhladny lies opposite the point where it meets the Malka River. In the lower reaches, the Baksan is used for irrigation purposes and has a hydroelectric power station built on it, known as the Baksan Hydroelectric Power Station.

The Baksan River also has an increased level of contamination.

== Gallery ==
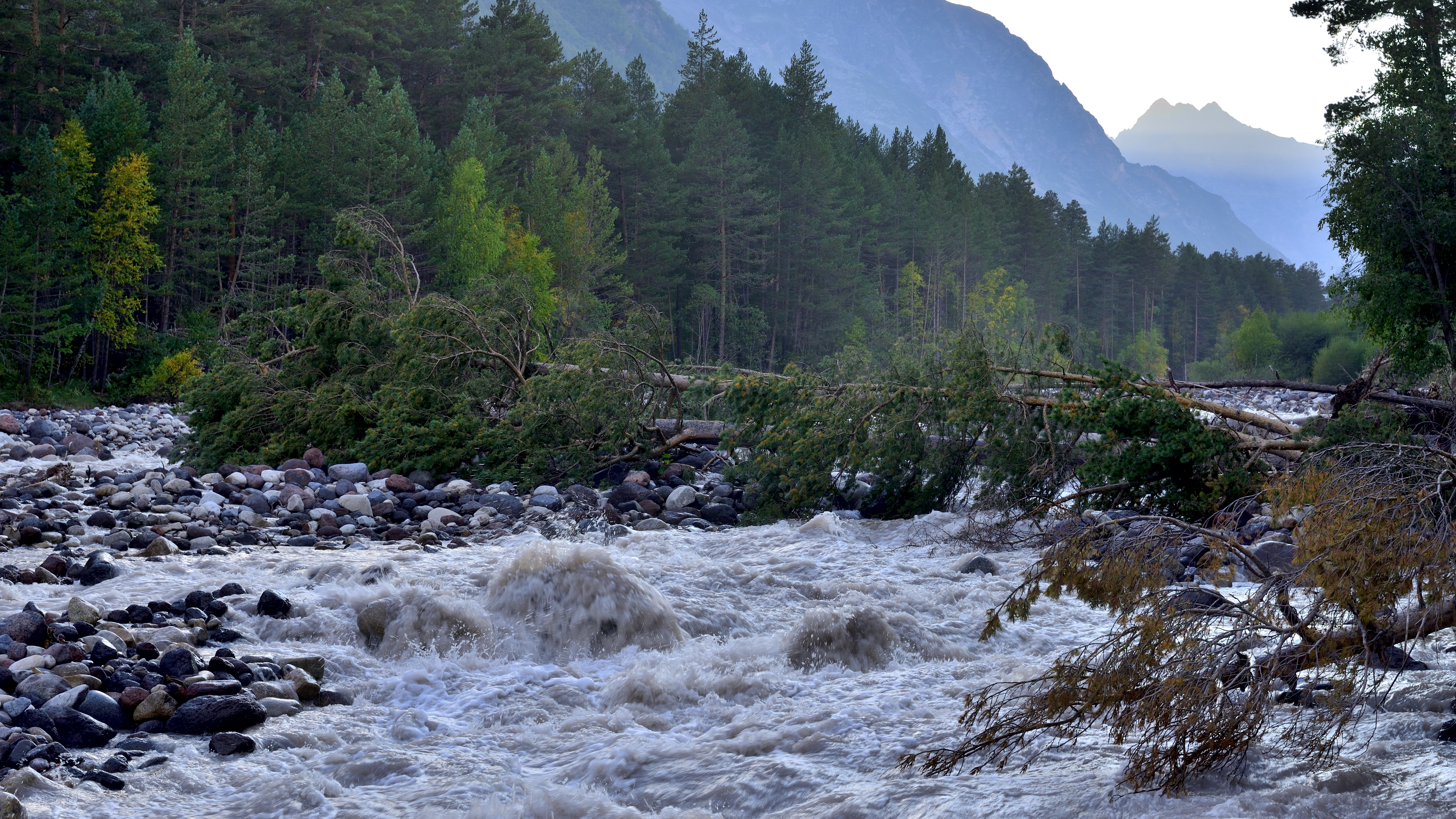
Stormy Baksan

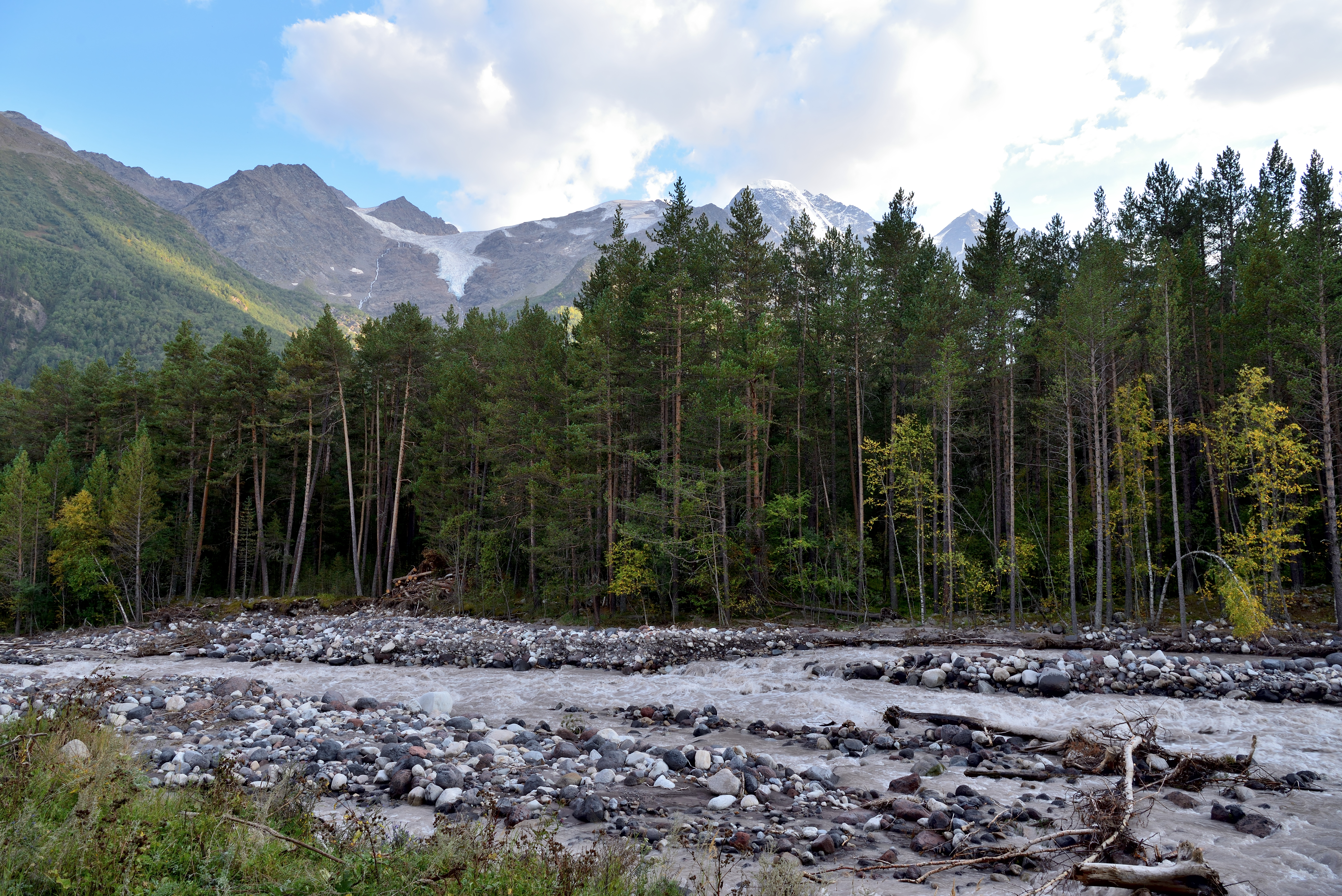
Forest on the bank of Baksan
