= Hatokhshoqo IV of Kabardia =

Supreme Prince of Kabardia

Hatokhshoqo Hatokhshoqo
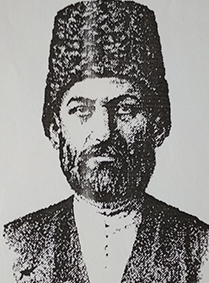

Grand Prince of Kabardia
- Reign: 1809
- Predecessor: Hatokhshoqo III of Kabardia
- Successor: Kushuk Jankhot
- Born: 19th century Kabardia
- Died: 1809; Kabardia
Names
- Hatokhshoqo, son of Misost
- Kabardian: ХьэтIохъущокъуэ и къуэ ХьэтIохъущокъуэ
- House: Inalid dynasty; House of Hatokhshoqo
- Father: Misost the Great

Hatokhshoqo Hatokhshoqo (Kabardian: ХьэтIохъущокъуэ и къуэ ХьэтIохъущокъуэ) was a Kabardian prince of the Hatokhshoqo dynasty and, briefly, Grand Prince of Kabardia in 1809. He was a son of Misost the Great and belonged to one of the leading princely families of Kabardia during the late 18th and early 19th centuries. Due to the scarcity of direct sources, details of his life are fragmentary and are primarily reconstructed from references in contemporary documents and reports.

== Family ==
Hatokhshoqo was the son of Misost the Great. His older brothers were Captain Temirbolet of the Russian army, Colonel Aslanbech, and Aslandjery. All three were cousins of Ismail Atazhukin, the well-known hero of a poem by Mikhail Lermontov. The Hatokhshoqo family estates were located in the upper reaches of the Kuban River and along the banks of the Baksan River, according to documents included in the KRO collection. Until the 1760s, the main Hatokhshoqo estates (with a few exceptions) were situated in the regions of Pyatigorsk, Kuma, and Baksan. After the defeat of anti-Russian resistance in Kabardia by tsarist generals in 1769 and 1779 (Medem, Yakobi, and Fabrician respectively), the border of Kabardia was pushed back to the Malka River. Little is known about the subsequent location of the Hatokhshoqo family's lands and estates in the late 18th and early 19th centuries.

== Biography ==
There is almost no direct documentary evidence that would allow a more or less complete reconstruction of Hatokhshoqo's biography; his activities can only be discussed through descriptions of events in which he was, or most likely could have been, a participant. In the monograph by N. A. Smirnov, Russia's Policy in the Caucasus, there is a reference to a message from the uzden of Greater Kabardia, Shabazdjery Kundet, in 1785, stating that the Kabardian prince Hatokhshoqo, with more than 300 men, gathered on the Nalchik River and planned to attack the village of Prokhladnaya, while his brother Aslanbech, with a hundred men, headed toward the residence of Sheikh Mansur.

A letter from Governor-General P. A. Tekelli to G. A. Potemkin-Tavrichesky discusses internal disagreements within the Hatokhshoqo family arising from the division of serfs and property, which could have led to the murder of the sons of Misost the Great (Hatokhshoqo and Aslanbech) by Adildjery Hatokhshoqo. From a report by the commander of the Caucasian Corps, General S. A. Bulgakov, to General A. P. Tormasov, dated July 17, 1809, it is evident that Ismail Bey met with his fellow countrymen in Baksan and spoke at a meeting of the Khasa during the election of the chief prince, Kushuk Jankhot. The Misost family, including Hatokhshoqo Misost, did not participate in the meeting due to its small number. T. Kh. Kumykov writes:

"In the summer, a meeting of the feudal elite took place on the Malka River, at which a formal reconciliation of the two warring feudal groups took place. Kuchuk Zhankhotov and Atazhuko Atazhuk were elected senior princes. The meeting resolved to prevent further 'predation' on the Line, to live peacefully and fulfill the orders of the Russian authorities."

This resolution was later violated by an anti-Russian group of nobles led by Hatokhshoqo. He died on September 25, 1809. Following his death, an armed Kabardian detachment that had been preparing to attack the North Caucasus Line called off the raid. He served as Grand Prince of Kabardia for no more than three months.

== Sources ==
- Kardanov, Ch. E. (2016). Князья Кабарды [Princes of Kabardia] (in Russian). Nalchik: Izdatel'stvo M. i V. Kotlyarovykh. ISBN 978-5-93680-971-2.
