= Qushuq of Kabardia =

Kabardian grand prince

Qushuq Jankhot
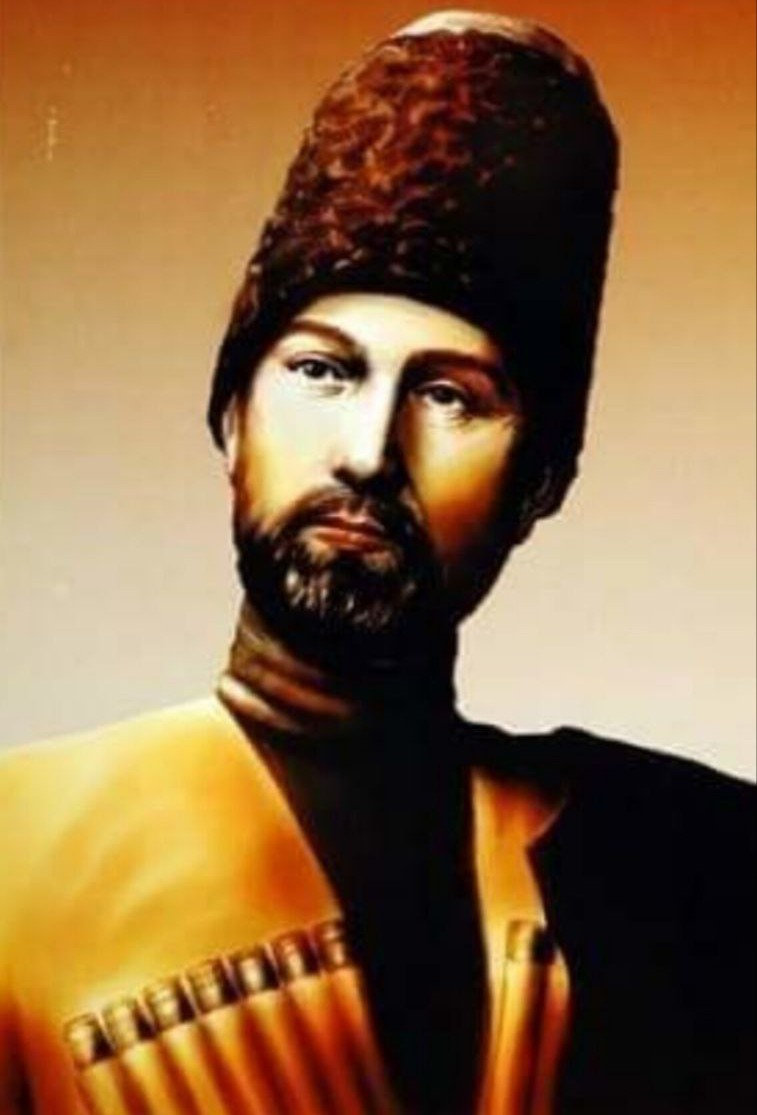
- Modern depiction of Qushuq

The Grand Prince of Kabardia
- Reign: 1809–1822
- Predecessor: Hatokhshoqo IV of Kabardia
- Successor: Office abolished

Head of the Court of Kabardia (Russian Empire)
- Reign: 1822–1830
- Predecessor: Office established
- Successor: Yakub Shardan
- Born: c. 1758; Kabardia
- Died: 1830; Russian Empire
- Spouses: Shekhughuey; Khaniy; Unnamed third wife
- Issue: Jembulat; Hamsad; Qabakhan; Pshimakho
- Kabardian: Жанхъуэт Кушыку
- House: House of Bechmirza
- Father: Jankhot Tatarkhan
- Religion: Sunni Islam

Qushuq Jankhot (Kabardian: Жанхъуэт Кушыку) was the Kabardian Grand Prince between 1809 and 1822 and head of the Kabardian Provisional Court between 1822 and 1830.

== Early life ==
According to S. N. Beituganov, Qushuq Jankhot was born in 1758. It is known that in 1783, he was present at the drafting of a letter from Kabardian owners to the commander of the Caucasian Corps, P. S. Potemkin, regarding the transition of the Trans-Kuban people and residents of the Taman Peninsula to Russian citizenship.

Brigadier Gorich's report names the Kabardian princes who fought on Russia's side in the Anapa campaign (1787). Among them is Kuchuk Dzhanhotov which is the name of Qushuq in Russian sources.

Soon, at Gudovich's suggestion, Russian authorities began establishing secular "clan" courts in Kabardia, separately for princes and "clan courts and punishments" for uzdens and serfs. Clan courts were established:

- For the princes Bechmirza and Qeytuqo
- For the Hatokhshoqo and Misost families
- For Lesser Kabardia

The commandant of Mozdok oversaw the work of the courts, which now operated under Russian law.

Such a clear violation of national laws in 1794 led to an uprising in Kabardia.

Qushuq firmly advocated a peaceful resolution of all conflicts. This is also evidenced by the response of General K. F. Knorring, commander of Russian troops in the Caucasus, on February 15, 1802, who named Qushuq Jankhot, Hatokhshoqo Hamirza, and Aslanbech Misost among the most famous and authoritative princes.

In 1802, Alexander I appointed Lieutenant General P. D. Tsitsianov, a supporter of harsh measures to establish Russian rule in Kabardia and the author of the project for the construction of new fortifications on the Georgian Military Road, as commander of the North Caucasus Line.

In December of that year, Tsitsianov wrote in a letter to Hatokhshoqo Hamirza, Aslanbech Misost, and Qushuq Jankhot that:

"Kabardian fickle-minded individuals, no one knows who, burned down one of the state-owned buildings built for the trial and tribal reprisals of the Misostov and Atazhuk families, and broke down the doors and windows of all the others."

Tsitsianov attributed this "insolence" to the absence of "primary" rulers in Kabardia, demanding their immediate return from the upper Kuban. Apparently, the new commander had placed certain hopes on cooperation with Qushuq. He had good reason for this: Prince Qushuq, acting in the interests of Kabardia, remained loyal to the Russian authorities.

In 1803, Tsitsianov built a fortress in Kislovodsk and a number of military outposts, hindering the highlanders' ties with Trans-Kuban. His commitment to forceful action in relations with Kabardia is eloquently demonstrated in his letter to the "honorary princes, uzdens, and effendii" of April 4, 1804:

"The blood within me boils as in a cauldron, and my limbs tremble with greed to water your lands with the blood of disloyalty. I know how to keep my word and will not promise anything I cannot back with my blood. Expect, I tell you, by my rule, bayonets, cannonballs, and rivers of bloodshed. The rivers flowing through your lands will not be muddy, but red, dyed with the blood of your families. I have shown you two paths, and it is your duty to choose the better one, and I order you to respond within a week of receiving this..."

The uprising that began in Kabardia was both anti-feudal and anti-colonialist in nature. The uprising was fueled by the socio-economic factors that had developed in Kabardian society by that time, as well as the tsarist government's restriction of the power of the feudal nobility. The pretext was the construction of the Kislovodsk fortress and the forced elections to "tribal courts and courts of justice" imposed on the Kabardians.

In 1804, the famous Kabardian princes and officers of the Russian army, Aslanbech Misost, Qushuq Jankhot and Hatokhshoqo Hamirza, Temirbolet Misost and Dolet Qasey, took part in the suppression of the rebels on the side of the Russian troops under the command of Lieutenant General G. I. Glazenap. Up to thousands of representatives of all classes of Kabardian society—princes, workers, peasants, including Balkars, Karachays, and Ossetians—participated in the uprising. During its suppression, tsarist troops burned 80 Kabardian villages in Chegem, Shalushka, Nalchik, and Cherek.

== Reign ==
No documentary evidence regarding the election of Qushuq by Khasa in 1806 as the Grand Prince of Kabardia is available, except for a message from he himself to the chief bailiff, Major General I. P. Delpozzo, dated November 18, 1806:

“The former senior owner of Kabardia, Atazhuk Hamurzin, of which your Excellency is well aware, by the will of God died, and I, having remained after him, now, by seniority, the peoples entrusted to my department are in complete obedience.”

Based on his assurances of "obedience" and bearing in mind a recent Chechen raid that had stolen cattle, sheep, and horses from Kabardia, Delpozzo attempted to use the senior prince and other elders of the Jambot family for the punishment being prepared by Russian troops against the Chechens. Qushuq gathered the princes, nobles, and clerics of Islam for a council. Some participants, especially the clergy, refused to consent, but left it to Qushuq, to carry out a political turn against the Chechens.

Prince Batoqo Jembulat headed an embassy to Chechnya, laying out his demands. The Chechens, however his demands were rejected by the Chechens.

At a meeting of the Khasa of Greater Kabardia, Russian general Delpozzo convinced the Kabardian princes and warks to act against the Chechens with all of Kabardia.

Twenty-five nobles from the three main families, along with their leading nobles and members of other classes, crossed the Terek on February 19 and set up camp on the Sunzha River, above Kazachiy Brod, opposite the Karabakh villages. Five days later, four princes of Little Kabardia approached the main force, thus forming a detachment of over 3,500 men. By this time, Lieutenant General Musin-Pushkin had already captured the Karabakh villages, with the exception of the village of Gudy. However the Kabardians refused Delpozzo's proposal to immediately march into Chechnya, again citing the impossibility of going against their fellow believers.

Qushuq Jankhot played a key role in thwarting the tsarist authorities' attempt to use the Kabardians in the fight against the Chechens. Gudovich wrote to Bulgakov on March 20, 1807:

"I deeply regret that the Kabardians, who, according to General Delpozzo's report, were fully prepared to join our troops against the Chechens, were not used in this matter."

One of the main principles of the policy of colonizers of all times and peoples, "Divide and rule!", did not bring results in this case. Gudovich admitted to this way of thinking quite openly:

“My whole goal was to set these two peoples at odds with each other and bring them into hostility against each other, thereby weakening them over time”

The Kabardian princes communicated primarily with the bailiff on various matters pertaining to Kabardia's internal and external affairs, and it was only natural that, with Delpozzo as an obvious ill-wisher, they encountered serious difficulties in establishing good-neighborly relations with Russia. These difficulties also confronted Qushuq, who, while preserving the identity and dignity of his people, simultaneously remained loyal to the Russian state. In March 1807, according to his report to I. P. Delpozzo, a Turkish emissary visited the Misosts. He visited Mullah Ishak and Prince Adildjeriy Hatokhshoqo with the secret mission of inciting Kabardia against Russia, a fact Delpozzo reported to I. V. Gudovich. Qushuq writes that an agreement with the Turks will not "follow.":

"...we have already tried several times to be deceived by Turkish gold and have brought ourselves to complete ruin, so that if Russia had not been so merciful, we would have long ago been completely exterminated, and in our present dire circumstances, when God has punished us and the plague has wiped out almost half the people, we have reached the point that if Russia had not helped us with grain, then we, the last of us, would all have died of starvation. It is true that the young people are very happy about this occasion (the arrival of the Turkish agent), but they are stupid, they know nothing, and I will not give them free rein in my family names, and my power will force them to fulfill my will."

This message once again clearly shows that Qushuq without being swayed by Turkish promises, continued to pursue a policy of further rapprochement with Russia, a policy supported by the Bechmirza and Qeytuqo families.

On April 14, 1808, Qushuq's name is among the signatures on a letter to Bulgakov stating that the ambassadors of the Shah and Tsarevich Alexander had not yet appeared before him.

Considering Qushuq's considerable power and influence in Kabardia and his attitude toward Russia, A. P. Tormasov considered it necessary to support him in every possible way by providing him with benefits and rewards. With Prince Qushuq's help, Tormasov hoped to restrain the most important owners from their undertaking to rebel against the authorities and the force of arms.

Qushuq was to win over those owners "who subsequently succumbed to the lure of their obstinate spirit, or, at the very least, to persuade the black Kabardian people to resettle within the Russian borders." It was proposed that lands for the settlers be allocated along the Caucasus Line, in the area of the new redoubt erected in Lesser Kabardia

However, according to Bulgakov, Jankhotov "evaded the fulfillment of this order with various pretexts." Qushuq, as Bulgakov wrote;

"is a cunning man, capable of presenting himself in a two-faced manner, thereby concealing his own interesting plans and greatly contributing to the ill-intentioned arousal of other Kabardian owners of a savage disposition. However, they possess a firmness of character, according to which one should expect more from them than from Qushuq."

Bulgakov, a short-sighted, rude soldier, believed that Qushuq, with his "two-faced" actions, concealed his agreements with other owners against all "ill-intentions" toward Russia.

The struggle against the colonial policy of tsarism continued in 1809-1810, and the princes, who were opposed to rapprochement with Russia, were planning to resettle their subjects in the mountains.

In November 1809, a khasa was gathering on Malka. The talk was already of an armed uprising against the tsarist generals, for which it was proposed to evacuate the population from the villages to the Baksan, Chegem, Nalchik, and Urukh gorges, along with their livestock, and to do this by the end of winter and only then begin action.

An emissary from the Turkish pasha from beyond the Kuban region attended the meeting of the khasa, bringing expensive gifts and money to Kabardia. Naturally, this was in exchange for the Kabardians' decisive action against Russian troops.

At a meeting of the Khasa, attended not only by princes and workers but also by the peasants, a rift arose between the feudal minority and the peasant majority, which did not wish to participate in the war against the Russians. This was stated by a delegation of 2,000 peasant households, who appealed to the bailiff I. P. Delpozzo in February 1810, asking for protection from the prince's arbitrary rule and exorbitant taxes.

Delpozzo delayed his answer, knowing about the preparations for an expeditionary campaign of Russian troops in Kabardia.

Talking about the refusal of Qushuq Jankhot, not only the Grand Prince but also the head of the council, the spiritual court established by the emperor, to travel to Georgiyevsk. Many of the owners also spoke out against such a trip. Jankhotov himself sent two letters to Bulgakov and Delpozzo, in which he asserted that his refusal did not at all signify a violation of his duties to the emperor:

"This grieves me greatly, for which I have never been a traitor or violator of the sovereign in my entire life, and I will never do so in my entire life."

Qushuq explains his refusal as impossible

On March 18, Qushuq Jankhot met with General Delpozzo in the village of Prokhladnaya. They conversed, and the police officer came to the conclusion that all of Kabardia has a general agreement to unrest and the intention to soon act hostilely against Russian borders.

The bailiff reported to Bulgakov the impossibility of agreeing with the Misost family and pinned all hope on Prince Qushuq, who promised to provide "preliminary information" on the actions of the anti-Russian princely coalition, within which there were disagreements: not all the owners approved of the prospect of war with Russia, although this did not eliminate the possibility of a quick explosion. And here the preconditions for a certain relaxation of tensions arose.

On April 14, Bulgakov passed Baksan, and bloodshed began in the upper reaches of the Baksan, Chegem, Shalushka, Nalchik, and Cherek. On April 25, Bulgakov's detachment joined forces with Delpozzo, who had set out from Yekaterinograd. To this day, the oral folklore of the Kabardian people contains tales of a brutal battle in Lesser Kabardia, where the “survivors” perished in the Kambiley

Kabardian princes wrote to the tsarist administration about Bulgakov's expedition, which "destroyed houses with fire", ravaged villages, and stole livestock, property, provisions, and weapons from the population: "6,150 horned cattle, 515 horses, 125 buffalo, 44,015 sheep, 6,310 poods of copper utensils, 5,895 poods of honey, 52 suits of armor, 180 guns, 300 sabers, 145 sabres, 2,900 silver coins, goods worth 5,800 rubles in silver, 1,420 poods of millet." 31 people from the Qudenet and Tambiy clans were killed, 9,585 households were burned, 111 mosques and 1,000 farmsteads were destroyed, and 41 people were taken prisoner.

On September 20, 1815, the Digor elders Ali and Hamurza Cherkeidze, Zaurbi and Devletuko Badelidze, by agreement with the Imeretian leader and the Racha archbishop, sent a letter to General Rtishchev. It stated that the Racha people, who were at odds with each other but were under the patronage of the Russian emperor's "right hand," were asking the "chief" of the Circassian-Kabardian people, Qushuq Jankhot, "to come to the house of Mameda and Zambulidze Kubadisshivili" to "establish general peace." The Racha people reminded him that a truce had been concluded between them and Circassia Kabardia "through him," Lieutenant Colonel Jankhot, and asked Rtishchev to confirm the conclusion of a "perfect peace" with the Kabardians.

In response to one of Prince Qushuq’s messages, Rtishchev thanked him for his efforts and “zeal for the benefit of His Imperial Majesty’s service” with a report on peace with Ossetia.

The Supreme Prince of Kabardia, in a letter to Rtishchev dated August 24, 1814, expresses his satisfaction with the fact of Digoria’s annexation to the Russian state, in which the Digorians pronounced the words of the oath in their own language and swore on the Koran.”

Thus, Qushuq Jankhot not only sought to strengthen relations between Kabardia and Russia, but also in every possible way promoted the rapprochement of other Caucasians with the Russian state, doing this with the mediation and knowledge of Rtishchev. One must assume that Prince Qushuq understood perfectly well that the policy of force

Rtishchev highly praised the activities of Prince Qushuq, who, in the general's opinion, possessed "gratifying principles of justice, which do him special honor."

On January 29, 1816, Delpozzo reported to Rtishchev that Qushuq Jankhot had come to him on his own initiative about his mediation "in the restoration of lasting peace among all the mountain peoples, based on mutual friendship."

In 1811, barter yards were established on the Caucasus Line, where trade with the highlanders for salt, grain, and other goods was established. With Rtishchev's consent, Kabardians and other highlanders were permitted to enter the cities of the Caucasus Governorate for trading purposes; they could now graze cattle in the Prokhladny quarantine area. Judging by the correspondence with Rtishchev, Qushuq Jankhot also took an active part in arranging these matters

In 1816, by sending A. P. Yermolov, a military general in the Napoleonic Wars, to the Caucasus in place of Rtishchev, Alexander I certainly had in mind the continuation of colonial policy in the region

Qushuq Jankhot welcomed this appointment, and it must be said that his intuition failed him: he could never have imagined that it would be Yermolov who would completely subjugate Kabardia, take away its power as uali, and establish a system under which the Kabardian people would be unable to even think of any freedom.

Ermolov began establishing his own order in Kabardia by destroying the aul of Tramov, where on the night of May 3-4, 1818, a detachment of Kabardins took refuge, fleeing from the Cossacks who were pursuing them for an attack on the village.

Upon learning of the destruction of Tramov's aul, Qushuq Jankhot sent a protest to Ermolov, to which Ermolov replied:

"You consider the punishment of Tramov's aul to be a lack of respect for you and think that it has been treated unfairly. I have ordered it and I warn you that, having been excessively lenient for a year and a half toward the vile and fraudulent actions of the Kabardian people, I will now take entirely different measures than I have until now."

On November 1, 1818, Ermolov from Grozny arrived in Prokhladnaya to meet with Kabardian owners and religious ministers.

Ermolov wrote to General Zakrevsky in St. Petersburg:

"In October I went to the border of Kabardia, where I gathered all the princes and their most distinguished officers, in order to present and explain to them how unreasonable their behavior was and what dangers they were exposed to, acting with such impudence against Russian subjects... I gave them instructions and, without changing anything in their form of government, I promised to introduce some order among them next year”

In 1819, Ermolov replaced Delpozzo with Major General K. F. Stahl, believing that the former’s “delicacy” had led to an outbreak of “debauchery and lawlessness” in Kabardia.

In 1821, together with Stal, Ermolov prepared a plan for the complete conquest of Kabardia, according to which a cordon line was to be advanced deep into its territory, thereby cutting off the Kabardian princes and peasants from Trans-Kuban. Expeditionary regiments were brought in, with the task of moving from place to place, undertaking "not battles or skirmishes with the Kabardians, but the deprivation of their flocks and herds, which, of course, they cannot hide, for in the mountains, no less than the cruelty of the times, they are threatened by the hostility of oppressed peoples, who, having been approved not only by the usual instant permission of our troops, but also by their constant presence, will wish to take revenge on them for all the insults suffered." 27 This concerned "the inhabitants of Alagir and Digor," but the principle remained the same: "Divide and rule!"

Military actions began in the autumn of 1821 and were of a brutal colonial nature; dozens of Kabardian and Abaza villages were destroyed, the property of the inhabitants was plundered, cattle and herds were driven away, grain reserves, fodder, and hay were given over to the maintenance of troops or consigned to fire. The level of tyranny that had taken place is evidenced by General Stahl's inquiry about the fate of 149 prisoners, to which Ermolov's chief of staff, Lieutenant General A. A. Velyaminov, responded with the following order: "...select those fit for service and immediately send them away," the rest to be enslaved; "exchange their wives and children" for prisoners from Russian detachments or hand them over "to the Cossacks for service," if the landowners do not wish to "take them into their employ at their own expense."

As a result, in May-June 1822, the devastated and ruined Kabardia was completely subordinated to the military-administrative administration of Yermolova.

== Under Russian rule ==
Qushuq Jankhot was appointed Chairman of the Kabardian Provisional Court, and Yakub Shardan was appointed Secretary. Interference with the judicial prerogatives of princes, warks, and Muslim clergy was prohibited.

The establishment of the Kabardian Provisional Court and the construction of new fortifications on the territory of Kabardia caused new unrest in 1822 and 1825, which were brutally suppressed. Qushuq's son, Jambulat, participated in the 1825 uprising. By order of A. A. Velyaminov, Prince Qushuq and his entourage were invited to the Nalchik fortress, accompanied by his son Jambulat. On October 25, Jambulat was shot for refusing to disarm. A. S. Griboyedov, A. A. Velyaminov, and Prince Qushuq Jankhot were present.

Qushuq Jankhot died in 1830.

== Family ==
A member of the Kabardian Bechmirza family, he was the oldest son of Prince Jankhot II.

He married three times. He had three sons and two daughters. His oldest son drowned in the Kuban river and his second oldest son died in Georgiyevsk. His youngest son Jambulat was killed in 1825 by Russians. His brothers were baptised and accepted Christianity.

== Sources ==
- Kardanov, Ch. E. (2016). Князья Кабарды [Princes of Kabarda] (in Russian). Nalchik: Izdatel'stvo M. i V. Kotlyarovykh. ISBN 978-5-93680-971-2.
