= Seven Months' War =

Conflict in 1779 between the Russian Empire and the Grand Principality of Kabardia

- Part of the Russo-Circassian War
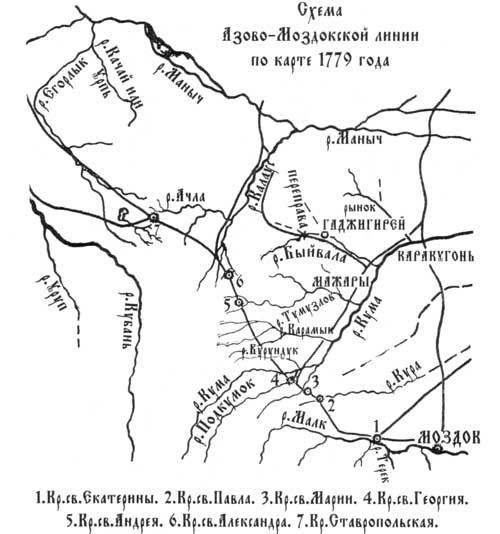
- Finished fortresses of the Azov-Mozdok Line on the map in 1779
| Date | March – December 1779 |
| Location | Kabardia, North Caucasus |
| Result | Russian victory |
| Territorial changes | Russian annexation of Kabardia up to the Terek and Malka rivers |

Belligerents
| (Russian Empire) Russia: Cossacks; Kalmyks; Russian Administration of Kabardia | (Circassia) Circassians: Anti-Russian Faction of Kabardia; Chemguy Principality; Besleney Principality; Bzhedug Principality; Abaza; …and others Other allies: Chechens; Akhlo Nogais (Note: Akhlo Tugan Nogais who were Kuban Nogais were allied with the Kabardians besides Chemguys and Besleneys. While the Kasey Nogais were considered enemies due to conflicts with the Circassians under Dulak Sultan’s command. The Circassians were encouraged by the Ottoman Empire and led by Dulak Sultan, Kizilbek, Duguzey and Alyak-Girey (who was invited to Istanbul for embolden against the Russian-sided Nogais) attacked the Kasey Nogais to seek revenge for a previous raid and weaken Russian influence in the region.) |

Commanders and leaders
| Catherine II; Grigory Potemkin; Gen. Alexander Suvorov; Maj. Gen. Ivan Yakobi; Maj. Gen. Fedor Fabritsian; Col. Schultz; Col. Ladjensky; Col. Velikopolsky; Col. Dmitry Tuganov; Col. Yefim Dmitrievich; Col. Asheraden; Lt. Col. Ivan Savelyev; Lt. Col. Keck; Lt. Col. Nikolai Lvovich; Lt. Col. Yakim Chornin; Capt. Bas Y. | Misost Bematuqo; Hamirza Qeytuqo †; Qaramirza Misost; Qanemet Yelbezduqo; Dulak Sultan |

Units involved
| (Russian Empire) Astrakhan Cossack Corps: Infantry Regiments: Tomsk Infantry Regiment; Kabardinsky Infantry Regiment; Ladoga Infantry Regiment Jäger (Rifle) Battalions: Kabardinsky Jäger Battalion; Gorsky Jäger Battalion Musketeer Battalion: Mozdok Field Musketeer Battalion Garrison Battalions: 2 Garrison Battalions in Kizlyar; 1 Garrison Battalion in Mozdok Cavalry Regiments: Vladimir Dragoon Regiment Cossack Regiments: Settled Cossacks; Rebrikov Cossack Regiment; Ustinov Cossack Regiment; Andronov Cossack Regiment; Kuteinikov Cossack Regiment; Davydov Cossack Regiment; (Russian Empire) Fabritsian's Army (after September) | Kabardian Army: The Main Units: Misost's Army; Hamirza's Army; Qaramirza's Army; Allied Units: (Circassia) Circassians: Chemguys; Besleneys; Bzhedugs; Abaza Chechens Kumyks Nogais; Akhlo Nogais |

Strength
| 5,868 line troops 122 fortress cannons 3,000–4,000 Kalmyks …and others c. 13,800+ total | 7,000–12,000 Kabardian cavalry (Russian claim) c. 3,000 allied cavalry Unknown infantry (Note: Most of the infantry are made up of commoners.) c. 10,000–15,000+ total |

Casualties and losses
| Unknown | 2,000 cavalry (Note: According to Grigory Potemkin.); Unknown infantry; c. 3,400+ total casualties (Note: 3,000 casualties according to the report of General Yakobi in June. 300 from the Battle of Qeytuqo Tuasha in October. Others from the other reported clashes.) (Russian claim) |

The Seven Months' War (Kabardian: Мэзибл зауэ, Russian: Семимесячная война); also known as the Prince-Noble War (Kabardian: Пщы-уэркъ зауэ, Russian: Княжеско-дворянская война) or the Qurey War (Kabardian: Къурей зауэ) was a stage on the eastern theater of the Russo-Circassian War (1763-1864) in 1779 between the Russian Empire and the Grand Principality of Kabardia. It was the largest conflict in the war up to that time. The Circassians referred to it as the "Seven Months' War" because they considered the war to have lasted from its beginning in March until the final major battle in September.

== Background ==
The foundation of Mozdok Fortress in 1763 marked the beginning of Russia's conquest of the Caucasus. The free use of migration routes was crucial for the Kabardians, Abazins, Ossetians and Balkars, who mainly made their living from animal husbandry. However, Russia’s expansionism that started with Mozdok Fortress was cutting off these vital routes, causing the Kabardian economy to collapse, leaving the people impoverished and under harsh living conditions. Two aristocratic factions of Kabardia, Baksan and Kashkhatau, united against the Russian threat. In 1774, Russia pursued to take over the northern lands of Kabardia and continued to build the Kizlyar-Mozdok Line, citing the Treaty of Küçük Kaynarca as the reason. Although the Kabardian independence had earlier been recognized by the two states, the Ottoman Empire under the Russian pressure agreed to cede Kabardia which had never been subject to it. Thus, the Treaty of Küçük Kaynarca allowed Russia to strengthen its claims over Kabardia's territory by political means. This occupation worsened the socio-economic situation of the Kabardian people. All diplomatic efforts to stop the invasion were unsuccessful.

On May 21, 1777, Russian General Ivan Yakobi was appointed as the commander of the Caucasus Corps, replacing General Ivan de Medem. In the same year, Russia started to build ten fortresses along the new line from Mozdok to Azov in a distance of 500+ kilometers with the order of President of the College of War, Grigory Potemkin. In a letter written by the Kabardian leaders to Catherine II in 1782, the main reason for all their disaffections and clashes was cited as the Russian fortifications along the Azov-Mozdok Line.

Along with the fortresses; outposts, forts, redoubts and stanitsas were also established. Cossacks were resettled on the line including the Volga and Khopyor Cossacks who participated in the Pugachev's Rebellion and exiled there. Russia continued to invade the northern Kabardian lands. This line deprived the Kabardians of their northern territories, which not only served as prime wintering grounds for their horse and cattle herds but also contained valuable arable land. As a result, the lack of sufficient pastureland at certain times caused widespread unrest among the majority of the population. The most significant lost grazing areas was the Qurey Plain (Kabardian: Къурей губгъуэ).

The Kabardians attempted to several attacks to prevent the construction of the fortresses. By the order of Yakobi, the Khopyor and Volga Cossack regiments were established, which were tasked with permanently guarding the line. Azov-Mozdok Line was built by Russian and Cossack troops, with the involvement of subjects loyal to the Russians. Durable and expensive materials were used in the construction of the fortresses. To accelerate the construction, serfs faced increased pressure. The Azov-Mozdok Line's functions and objectives were as follows:

- Protection of the southern provinces from attacks by the North Caucasian groups, including the protection of the territories of the North Caucasus.
- Subjugating the North Caucasians and repelling any enemy force including the Ottoman forces.
- Ensuring connection with South Caucasus (protection of the Georgian Military Road).
- Deploying reserve and outpost units to the south of Russia.

Potemkin also stated that the new line would benefit groups under Russian protection, while isolating the Circassian and Abaza tribes from their usual trade routes and grazing lands. He included saying that these lands should be used by Russians and their subjects instead. He described the region as economically valuable, suitable for farming, livestock, and other production. The line was also meant to reduce smuggling, improve tax collection, strengthen military security, and shorten transport routes between key areas of Caucasus.

By 1779, the fortresses built along the Azov-Mozdok Line on Circassian territory were: Yekaterinograd, Pavlovsk, Marinskaya, Georgiyevsk, Alexeyevsky, Alexandrovsky (Andreyevsky), and Stavropol. Pavlovsk also served as General Yakobi's main headquarters. After the fortresses were built, Cossack stanitsas were established in the new Russian territories. Stanitsas bearing the same names as the fortresses were also established in their vicinity. The Russian government frequently used the Cossacks to colonize Circassia and consistently ignored the acts of plunder and massacre the Cossacks committed against the local population throughout the century-long Russo-Circassian War. The main and the most guarded fortress of the line was the Marinskaya Fortress (near the present-day Fazannyi village). The Marinskaya, Georgiyevsk, and Pavlovsk Fortresses were built in the main Kabardian regions, restricting their movement with herds to the Setey and Qurey Plains, and the Kabardians, particularly sought to destroy these fortresses. In 1779, the Moskovskaya and Donskaya Fortresses were built to strengthen the western part of the line. The Kabardian princes were secretly forming an alliance with the neighboring tribes.

=== Early Clashes ===
Signs of unrest in response to the growing Russian presence began to surface in October 1777. Shortly after the construction of the line had begun, General Yakobi received reports that the Besleney and Chemguy Circassians had gathered near Beshtau. Unidentified Circassian groups were also reported to have attacked Cossacks near Madzhar. According to Colonel Dmitry Tuganov, 800 Besleney, Chemguy, and Abaza warriors under the command of Kaziy Giray Sultan joined forces with approximately 4,000 Kabardians with the intent of launching attacks on Russian positions along the line.

The Russians intercepted a letter from the Kuban Nogai princes of Akhlov to Prince Misost Bematuqo, falsely claiming the fortifications were built against the Czarina's will and urging their destruction.

Diplomatic efforts yielding no results with the Russians, in 1778, the Kabardians and their allies started their attacks on the line to stop the Russian expansion. In January, 3,000 Kabardians were going to attack the Petrovsk Fort, but the garrison abandoned the fort when they received the possible Kabardian attack and the Kabardians captured the fort without fighting. Kabardian forces, consisting of 4,000 cavalry commanded by Prince Dulak (or Chulak Sultan) attacked the Pavlovsk Fortress in June but was repelled by Colonel Baron Wilhelm von Asheraden, Russians lost 40 men. After this attack, the units on the fortification line were reinforced. On June 4, Kabardians launched an assault on Stavropol Fortress but repelled. On September 23, under the command of Dulak Sultan, they attacked the Arkhangelsk Redoubt. In December, the Kabardians looted a Russian fortress. At the end of 1778, Kabardians tried diplomatic solutions again, but they were unsuccessful.

Meanwhile in Kuban, General Suvorov's army frequently clashed with local Circassian tribes. In April 1778, Suvorov’s successor noted that the region was becoming increasingly dangerous and requested reinforcements from Yakobi.

=== The National Congress ===
On March 29, 1779, the Kabardian nobles and princes held a nationwide congress with the participation of Chemguy and Besleney princes. Prince Hamirza Qeytuqo, one of the main organizers of the war against the Russians, rallied the Kabardians, and other Circassian groups, while part of his own lands had also fallen into Russian hands.

The leader of the anti-Russian Kabardian aristocrats was Prince Misost Bematuqo. Grand Prince Tatarkhan Jankhot took an anti-war stance and stated that the Kabardians could not confront Russia. Tatarkhan acknowledges his status as a vassal under political pressure and acts in alignment with Russian authority. However most of the aristocrats were determined to fight until the lost territories were regained. Details of the congress were conveyed to the Russian authorities by the agent Murtaza Abregov.

In accordance with a decision made by the congress, an old tradition was reinstated: those who refused to take part in the war would be punished by being wrapped in wet black felt. According to Circassian oral sources, which are mentioned in the folkloric Night Assault song created by the chief bard of the Qeytuqo princely family, Tawqo Tlepshiqo, the Grand Prince's words during the congress were as follows:

"You’re striving for something that can never fit in your palms, we are too few to challenge the (Russian) state."

The Kabardians responded as follows:

"We are ready to die to be remembered in this old world, it is better for us to die with our honor."

During the congress, a letter was written in Tatar—the lingua franca of the region—to the commander of the Mozdok Fortress Dmitry Tuganov, signed by prominent Kabardian princes:

"...Her Majesty knows this very well: We have been under the protectorship of the Imperial Majesty since the time of Ivan the Terrible and we were pleased with his great generosity. Without any trouble, we loyally and quietly carried out the duties entrusted to us. However, a terrible torment is being inflicted upon us. Alongside actions that hinder our shepherds from freely grazing their flocks, our fertile arable lands are being trampled, burned and destroyed. Your armies are stationed on our borders. We cannot bear to witness this such a thing and cannot live under such conditions. As we are referred to as the subjects of the Tsar, if the Czarina has issued a decree for our destruction, we kindly ask you to inform us. We are free people; therefore we request that Major Tuganov be sent to us regarding all our petitions..."

"...If you do not destroy all the fortresses you have built, we swear that we are ready to wage war along the Kuban Circassians and to die."

The names of the prominent princes who signed the letter were: Aliy, Misost Bematuqo, Temruqo Haji Qilishoqo, Kartul (son of Islam), Beslan, Kurghoqo (son of Qaramirza), Qanemet Yelbezduqo Qeytuqo (son of Qanemet Qeytuqo), and Qaramirza Misost (son of Islam Misost). During the congress, the Circassians swore an oath that they were ready to fight and die if the Russian fortifications were not removed. The Lesser and Greater Kabardians crossed the Malka River and settled 7 kilometers away from Marinskaya Fortress with other Circassians and demanded the destruction of all the fortresses in sight, but the Russians rejected.

On April 28 the letter was translated into Russian. Then on May 1, Russian Lieutenant Colonel Yakim Chornin who was the adjudant to Dmitry Tuganov met with the Kabardians because Tuganov was afraid that the Kabardians may capture him. The Kabardians declared that any correspondence or letters from the Russians would not be acknowledged buildings. All diplomatic relations had been severed. They expressed that they don't want to see anyone from the Russians.

== War preparations ==
A Circassian military camp

In the spring of 1779, the Kabardians settled in Qeytuqo Tuasha (Kabardian: Къетыкъуэ тIуащIэ)—at the present-day Psykhurei—in the Qurey Plain between the Malka and Qeytuqo rivers, where all the war preparations were made in this forest; they began producing equipment and weapons, as well as constructing small defensive structures. The Kabardians were joined by their allies from neighboring regions. Circassians had a total of 15,000 cavalry (10,000 in other sources, including the at least 3,000 from other Circassian tribes) in the Russian sources. Contrary to common writing, the commoners participated in the war too, typically served as infantry, as indicated in oral sources.

According to tradition, the Grand Prince of Kabardia would be the commander-in-chief during wartime. However, since Tatarkhan Jankhot did not participate in the war, Prince Misost Bematuqo, known for his military skills and anti-Russian stance, was elected as the commander-in-chief during the congress. He participated in numerous battles and was highly esteemed by the people. His grandfather, Kurghoqo Hatokhshoqo, was the former Grand Prince.

The Kabardians were divided into three main armies: Misost Bematuqo (from the Hatokhshoqo dynasty) directly commanded one, Prince Hamirza Qeytuqo which was the son of Aslanbek Qeytuqo (from the Jembulat dynasty) led the second, and Prince Qaramirza Misost (from the Misost dynasty) commanded the third army. Prince Qanemet Yelbezduqo (cousin of Hamirza Qeytuqo) was responsible for intelligence affairs.

== The war ==
On March, Circassian cavalries—numbered 6–7,000—led by Prince Sultan Dulak launched a nighttime attack on Marinskaya with Nogais, Besleneys and Chemguys, they cut off the reinforcement line of the fortresses. They managed to take back 5,000 cattle from the Cossacks that had been taken from the Kabardians and killed 85 Cossacks. They also inflicted extensive damage on the fortress. Russian reinforcement units were sent to the fortresses along the line.

In the new orders sent by Catherine II through Grigory Potemkin to General Yakobi, it was instructed that the forces should not launch a general attack until September 15 and remain on the defensive. At that time General Yakobi, stationed in Pavlovsk Fortress with a force of 2,000 soldiers and awaiting reinforcements, he ordered that all Kabardians in Kizlyar be imprisoned and subjected to hard labor. The adult hostages, who were "peaceful" Circassians, were chained, and all the hostages were sent to Astrakhan. In the following years, requests for the return of the hostages were denied. Yakobi used this situation to threaten the Kabardians.

Prince Yelbezduqo bribed Artemy Voskanyan for 500 silver rubles, an Armenian from Crimea near Mozdok. With the support of regiment translators Nikolai Bezborodov and Peter Sergeyev, Voskanyan reported on the weak points of the Alexandrovsky Fortress, as well as the condition of the fortress and its garrison.

On April 23 [O.S. May 12], Voskanyan sneaked into Alexandrovsky Fortress, where Saint George's Day was being celebrated, and set fire to the dining hall near the church by burning hay. The smoke from the fire signaled the Kabardian army to attack, and they began their assault. They captured herds, prisoners, and goods during the attack. While the Russians gathering reinforcements, the Kabardians continued their attacks.

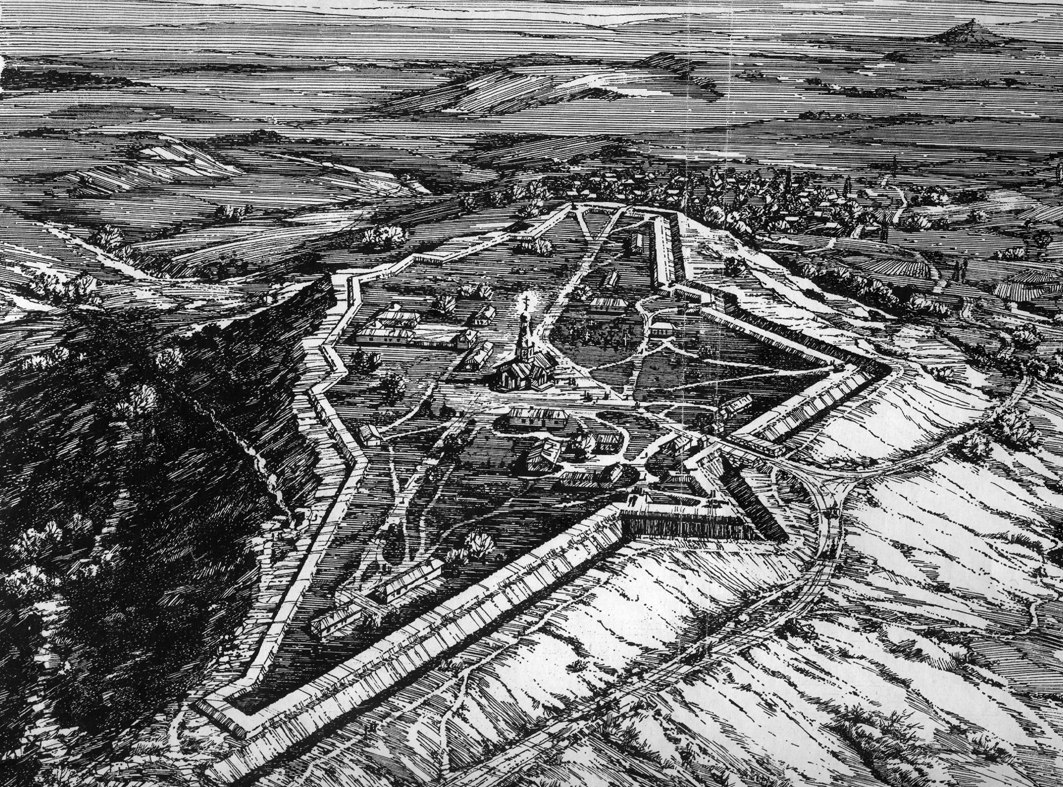
Stavropol Fortress

In mid-May, the Circassians began launching widespread coordinated attacks on the Azov-Mozdok Line. 1,500 Chemguy and Besleney Circassians, led by Dulak Sultan, attacked Stavropol Fortress, killed 20 Cossacks, captured food supplies and 240 horses. On May 30, 500 Circassians led by Sultan Dulak attacked Alexandrovsky Fortress. They managed to seize the horses of the Ustinov regiment but failed to capture the fortress due to heavy fire and retrated with more than 90 casualties. Grigory Potemkin ordered the formation of several Don Cossack regiments.

On June 4, Kabardian forces led by Sultan Dulak, attempted to seize Stavropol Fortress but failed. In the same month, the Circassians attacked Alexeyevsky Fort but retreated after the clashes while a separate contingent of Circassians attacked a Cossack unit there and defeated them.

Chechens attacked the Kalinovsky stanitsa of the Mozdok Cossack Regiment around the Mozdok Fortress. Clashes also occurred near Pyatigorsk. Andreyevsky and Marinskaya fortresses were taken by the Kabardian forces. Despite the initial gains of the Kabardians, rapid Russian reinforcements forced a withdrawal from the captured positions.

Circassians led by Dulak attacked Alexandrovsky Fortress on June but repelled. In the same month, near Stavropol Fortress, a Cossack detachment under the command of Colonel Yefim Dmitrievich attacked a Circassian detachment and defeated them. Soldiers in Yakobi's army were required to keep their uniforms on at night and sleep at the front with their rifles throughout the war.

During the war, Ottomans reinforced their fortresses on Circassian coast. Ottoman spies disseminated rumors among the Kabardian people that the Ottomans would extend assistance; however, no help was provided.

=== Battle of the Night Assault ===
On June 5, a 5–6,000-strong Kabardian army—led by Prince Hamirza Qeytuqo—was divided into 3 detachments. The first detachment attacked the Cossacks and Kalmyks who were attempting to join General Yakobi's army as reinforcements. The second detachment attacked Yakobi's camp and the last detachment made its way to attack Pavlovsk Fortress. Kabardians lost 120 men and withdrew.

On June 8, the Kabardians launched another attack on Pavlovsk Fortress but were forced back by heavy fire. They moved toward Marinskaya Fortress and set up near this fortress, 12.8 kilometers away from Pavlovsk, then started to siege the fortress. The Cossack garrison struggled to lock the fortress gates. The Kabardians received strong reinforcements from the Chechens, other Circassians and other neighbors, bringing their numbers up to 15,000, however this number may be heavily exaggerated by the Russian sources as it does not tally with the length of the single row line that the Circassian forces would later establish. Throughout the Caucasian War, the enemy's numbers were significantly inflated beyond their actual strength in Russian military reports. Additionally, Russian forces and casualties were reported as lower than they actually were, to exaggerate and highlight the value of victory.

On the night of June 9, the Kabardians besieging Marinskaya Fortress began digging trenches on both sides and extending them toward the fortress trenches. From the Circassian side, one group carried out trench-digging operations, while the others provided cover by rifle fire, ensuring that shots from the fortress caused minimal damage. The Circassians in the trenches and the Russians in the fortress were exchanging heavy fire. Other Circassian units took advantage of the darkness to reach almost up to the fortress moat.

On the evening of June 10, General Yakobi left Pavlovsk Fortress with his army and set towards Marinskaya to lift the siege and the critical condition, dividing his forces into three infantry squares and cavalries between the squares for the battle, this battle would later be known as the Kabardian Night Assault. The Kabardians left a total of 500 men in both trenches and positioned themselves on the closest ridge near Marinskaya Fortress from the direction of Pavlovsk, then forming a single row over 4 kilometers long parallel to the Russian army to frighten the enemy and take battle positions according to the enemy's position. General Yakobi approached and the Kabardians, in three groups, planned to attack on the Russian army from three squares.

As the Kabardians approached in range, Russians suddenly opened heavy fire. The Kabardians continued to advance to the front despite the intense fire, concentrating their attack on the center, where General Yakobi was located. The Russian infantry managed to broke up the Kabardian charge with volley fire. After that, they charged the Cossacks on the right flank of the Russian army, engaging in intense combat for 2 hours. Some of the Kabardians tried to slip behind the Russian army, but they were met with heavy fire.

The Kabardians then retreated, formed a loose semicircle in front of the Russian army and opened fire with rifles while reorganizing. However, as both sides were out of their rifle range, the Kabardians were engaging in hit-and-run tactics, getting close to shoot and then pulling back. After reorganizing, they attacked the left flank of the Russian army but the left flank of the Russians turned out to be stronger than the Kabardians had expected and had to retreat. Thus, General Yakobi forced the Kabardians to lift the siege in the 6-hour long battle in front of the walls of the Marinskaya Fortress, preventing the fortress from being taken. The commander of Marinskaya Fortress, Captain Bas Y. seized the opportunity, left his fortress and launched an attack on the Kabardians positioned in the trench resulting in the deaths of 97 Kabardians.

The Kabardians suffered 550 casualties; 50 nobles and princes and 500 commoners in the battle according to the Russian sources. Leader of this Kabardian army, Prince Hamirza Qeytuqo, his son Ismel (Ismail) Qeytuqo and Ismel's son Azhdzheriy were killed during the battle. In the oral sources, it is frequently mentioned that Ismel Qeytuqo dismounted and rescued his comrade Tambiyiqo's body after repelling the Russians.

A Night Assault song mentions Prince Hamirza Qeytuqo, who was 74 when he was killed:

"He had an open gaze and was generous throughout his lifetime.

When donating livestock, never regretted it.

In his old age, he partook in the Seven Months' War.

'These are infidels, and whoever dies [fighting them] is shahid', saying this, he encourages your unit.

The one before whose a large cannonball exploded,

The one whose end came in the Night Assault,"

[It is] Hamirza, of the Qeytuqo's"

After the Kabardian defeat in the Night Assault, they had to reduce their attacks and reorganize for a month. After this relatively calm month, the Kabardians demanded the destruction of Pavlovsk, Marinskaya, and Georgiyevsk fortresses in exchange for handing over all the captives and paying double the compensation for the damage caused; the occupation of this area forced the Kabardians to keep their herds in cramped conditions, as although they had a lot of unused land on the Kuban side, the mountainous terrain made it impossible to graze cattle especially in winter, and they did not prepare hay for the season. All their demands were rejected and the war continued.

The Russians refer to this battle as the Battle of Marinskaya (Russian: Марьинская битва). The term Night Assault (Kabardian: Жэщтеуэ, Adyghe: Чэщтео), for this battle was used by the Circassians. The Circassians also used "The Great Kabardian Night Assault" (Kabardian: Къэбэрдей Жэщтеуэшхуэ). In the Circassian languages, the word for night assault also means nightmare or "the evil spirit that causes sleep paralysis," but in a military context, it refers to an army launching a nighttime attack on an enemy force.

=== Aftermath clashes of the Night Assault ===
In June, Grigory Potemkin ordered Major General Fabritsian, who was in Ukraine, to advance quickly to the line, and then moved his cousin Major General Pavel Potemkin's troops in Poland to the Don River. In July, considering the situation in Kabardia to be very serious, Catherine II issued a secret decree allowing Russian armies to take whatever actions they deemed necessary in Kabardia including a punishment campaign against the Kabardians. General Yakobi stated in his general report dated June 18: "I defeated them decisively; they left behind 3,000 casualties, both wounded and killed."

The Circassians adhered to tactics of cutting off communication between the fortresses, devastating and burning fields. On July 17, a detachment of 5,000 Kabardians attacked the Georgiyevsk Fortress, burned all the grain, destroyed the hayfields, killed Cossacks, drove off the cattle and left, losing 27 men. Kabardians continued to attack the Georgiyevsk Fortress in August and September. In August, General Yakobi's army received new reinforcements. The Kabardians were constantly harassing Yakobi's forces, destroying their sentinels and stealing their herds.

At the end of August, a 1,000-strong Kabardian army attacked an 80-man Russian unit under the command of Lieutenant Colonel Nikolai Lvovich near Georgiyevsk while they were transporting supplies to Marinskaya Fortress. However, the Kabardian army was fired upon by snipers who had taken up positions at a distance, causing them to retreat with more than 100 casualties. On September 27, a new reinforcement army consisting of 8,000 troops under the command of Major General Fedor Fabritsian arrived at the Pavlovsk Fortress and set up camp near the Kuma River. On the same day, the Kabardians attacked a Russian unit consisting of 80 soldier, which was transporting supply, near Yekaterinograd, killing 41 Russians, including an officer, and capturing prisoners, gunpowders and one cannon.

=== Battle of Qeytuqo Tuasha ===
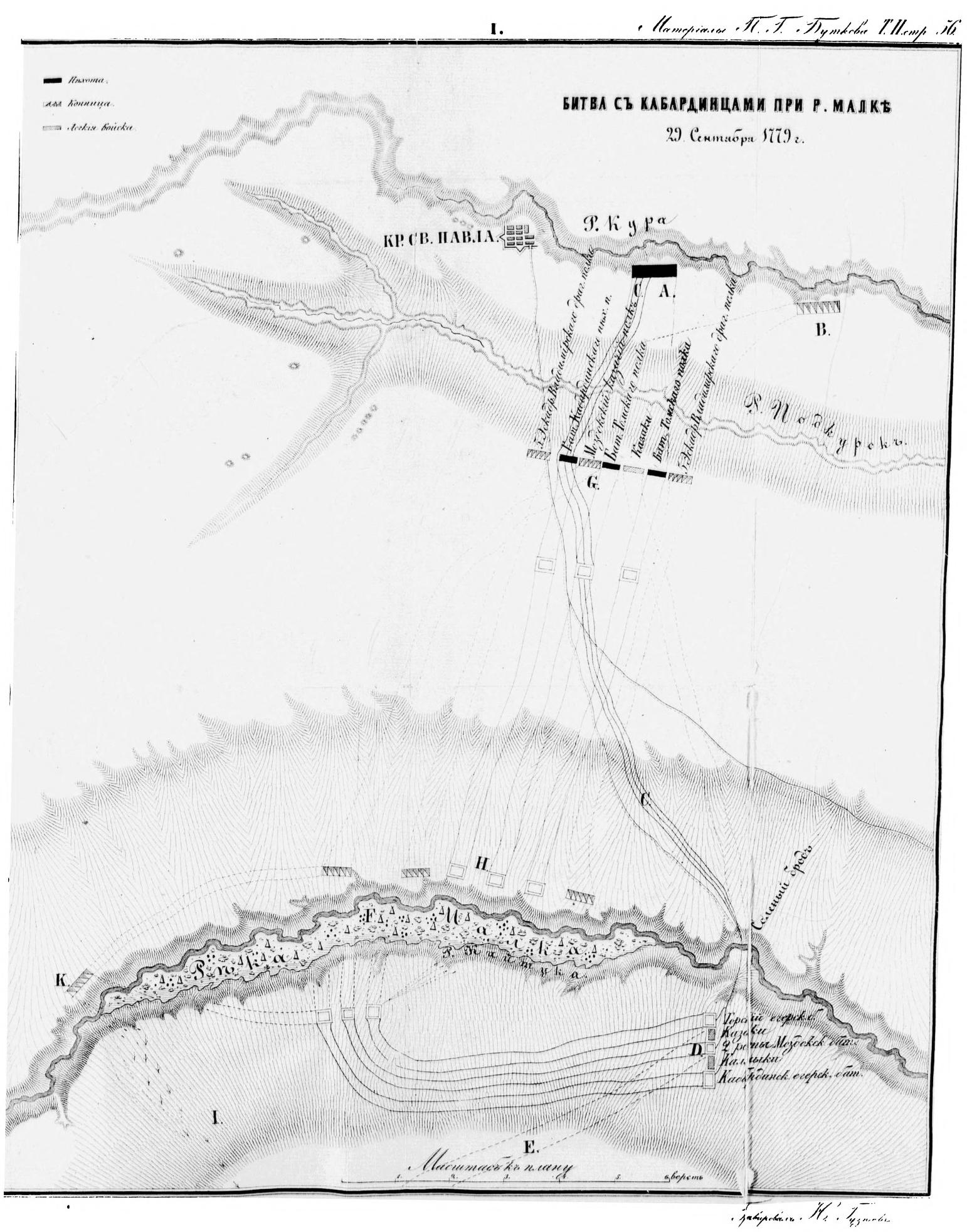
Map showing the course of the battle.

Fabritsian proposed a sudden attack on the main headquarters of the Kabardians, and the proposal was accepted. It is likely that someone informed Russians of the exact location of the Kabardian camp. On September 28, the armies of Fabritsian and Yakobi advanced toward the Kabardian headquarters in the evening while the Kabardian nobles and princes were making an attack plan in the camp. The Kabardian camp was located on the south bank of the Malka River which is the exact camp where all the war preparations were made.

Fabritsian crossed the Malka River from the east in the early hours of September 29 [N.S. 10 October] with 1,000 Cossacks, 1,000 Kalmyks, the Tomsk Infantry Regiment, the Kabardinsky Regiment, the Gorsky and Kabardinsky Jaeger battalions, two companies from the Mozdok Field Battalion and the Mozdok Cossack Regiment, and positioned themselves 3 kilometers south of the Kabardian headquarters. After that, Fabritsian sent the Cossack and Kalmyk cavalries toward the herd where the Kabardians kept their horses, driving off the horses of 2,000 warriors.

The Kabardians consisted of approximately 250–350 nobles, 50 princes and a cannon (the cannon captured near Yekaterinograd). At dawn, Fabritsian's army took position from three sides of the Kabardian headquarters and issued a call for surrender but the Kabardians responded to the surrender call with rifle fire. Fabritsian attacked the Kabardians at 7 AM and started the battle.

After crossing the Podkumok River, General Yakobi formed three squares with two battalions of the Tomsk Infantry Regiment and one from the Kabardinsky Infantry Regiment. On the flanks was the Vladimir Dragoon Regiment and ten companies from the Mozdok Cossack Regiment.

Upon seeing General Yakobi’s army approaching from the north, across the Malka River, the Kabardians broke through the encirclement from the west and began fleeing southward. General Yakobi’s Mozdok Cossack Regiment, positioned on the western flank across the river and opened artillery fire on the Kabardians. Additionally, two cavalry squadrons were sent across the Malka River and managed to reach the Kabardians who were lacking horses and fleeing on foot. The Cossack cavalry inflicted heavy losses and forced the survivors to retreat back to their camp.

While Fabritsian's army surrounded the camp from three sides, Yakobi surrounded it from the river side, where most of the distinguished Kabardians would be killed.

The battle started at 7 AM and ended at 12 PM with the complete annihilation of the Kabardian forces and the destruction of their headquarters, overwhelmed by the strategically, technologically, and numerically superior Russian troops.

Towards the end, Fabritsian sent his infantry army deep into the camp to completely destroy the remaining Kabardians with close combat. Very few Kabardians managed to escape according to the Russian report. Fabritsian's army suffered 16 deaths and 34 wounded while Yakobi's forces suffered 20 deaths and 80 wounded during the battle. The remaining Kabardian forces outside of the camp retreated to the Baksan River. The battle was fought mainly under the command of Fabritsian.

The common folk, including the defeated commoner infantry force numbering up to 6,000 according to the Russian sources, residing approximately 6–7 kilometers away, did not come to the aid of the Kabardian princes. Even if they had received the news in time, due to the short duration of the battle, it was difficult for the infantry to reach the location especially in an organized manner, and the Russian forces would not have permitted such a movement. Representatives of the Kabardian people, deprived of their leaders and dissatisfied with their princes, went to General Yakobi's camp and asked for mercy and peace in exchange for surrender. Yakobi told the representatives that the Kabardian people were subjects of the Russian Czarina, who had been forced into submission by force of arms, and that if any of the princes did not submit, all the subjects of that prince would also become rebels.

A song about the battle, compiled by the Circassian ethnograph Shora Nogmov:

"The next day, the General brought his two armies.

At dawn, it was a burning fire that continued.

Burning us inside, scattering us piece by piece.

Neither horse nor rider could help one another anymore.

Thunderous blasts (cannon fire) echoed through the vast valley.

Our horsemen were shouting madly in fury.

They gathered and showed what it meant to fight to the very end.

Our horsemen, desperately, were waging an infantry battle.

That very day, they learned how to fight in the Turkish (janissary style infantry war) way."

== End of the war ==
After the defeats and deaths of the most distinguished Kabardians, the Kabardian princes began negotiations. However, these negotiations were actually a diversion to organize new attacks on Russian fortresses. Towards the end of November, Kabardian princes refused to surrender and wrote to Ivan Yakobi that since the time of Ivan the Terrible, they had never been subjects of Russia, but had traditionally been under Russian protectorship and seen them as guests or allies and they were willing to accept the restoration of these same conditions. In order to prevent a new wave of attack, the Russians decided to attack deep into Kabardia to crush the remaining resistance.

General Yakobi set up a camp along the banks of the Malka River for a month, and after the Kabardians refused to surrender, he began his campaign into Greater Kabardia with several thousand troops on November 27 in the heavy winter, while Colonel Ivan Savelyev was in command of the campaign into Lesser Kabardia. As a result of the harsh weather conditions, 1,500 soldiers in Yakobi's army suffered from frostbite. Along the way, the army took shelter in abandoned villages. Clashes occurred in Tambiy village. Kabardian villages were burned, pillaged and damaged by the Russian forces during the campaign. On November 30, they reached the mountainous region in the south, where Kabardian forces were encamped. Prince Misost and Shamgar sent a delegation to the Russians.

At the beginning of December, General Yakobi and General Major Fabritsian formally declared the subjugation of Kabardia. The Caucasus Military Administration deemed it "impossible for the Kabardians to recover."

On December 2, (or December 9 according to other sources) the Kabardian princes were forced to concede defeat and reluctantly accept the treaty in front of Russian forces. The treaty imposed heavy obligations in exchange for the withdrawal of Russian troops from the designated borders. The obligations were as follows:

1. The livestock, goods and money allegedly plundered—by your side—last summer must be fully repaid as of today. You must account for the spoils of war. You are obligated to fully repay all our losses. The assets to be repaid are as follows:
  - 2150 Horses
  - 1914 Cattle
  - 2845 Cows
  - 4539 Sheep
  - 10,000 rubles
2. All captives from forts or roads, including those taken by Chechens, must be returned along with items stolen in 1777 from Mr. Molchanov, valued at 300 rubles, and those taken from residents of Kizlyar and Mozdok; Georgians, Armenians, and Tatars. You must also immediately surrender all Russian captives in Kabardia to Colonel Dmitry Taganov and return any Russian deserters who joined you last summer.
3. If any theft occurs against us in the future, whether committed by Chechens, Chemguys, Besleneys, or any other group, any individuals suspected of being in collaboration must vacate their lands and compensate for the losses incurred.
4. The border of Greater Kabardia was established along the Malka River, while Lesser Kabardia was set along the Terek River, according to the Czarina’s order. All lands beyond the Malka River are under the fortress lines’ control. You may not move livestock, farm, or claim these lands without permission from the regional fortress commander. Earlier, permission was granted for livestock movement, but it was misused, so this privilege is now revoked.
5. No one may cross the border without a permit from Colonel Taganov. Livestock passage across the border is strictly forbidden. If someone has a reason to cross, they must notify the fortress commander via the border guard. With permission, aristocrats will be escorted by two armed guards, and commoners by one. They must remain with the guard at the gate and cannot enter the fortresses without the commander's permission. If allowed entry, they may stay only in the designated area.
6. You are obligated, as per your oath, to faithfully execute any orders from Her Imperial Majesty. You must not oppose or disregard any of Her Majesty’s commands, covenants, or rules, with the understanding that you are subjects of Her Imperial Majesty.
7. You must not interfere with the Kuban Circassians, Chemguys, or Besleneys in their councils or defense. Greater Kabardia was prohibited from establishing diplomacy with the Ottoman Empire and the Crimean Khanate, while Lesser Kabardia was forbidden from engaging in diplomacy with the Chechens. Refrain from theft and be content with your own property, needs, and agriculture. Any deviation from this will incur the wrath of Her Imperial Majesty and severe punishment.
8. For the improvement of your well-being is proposed by your superior chief Czarina, you must accept all measures taken to this end with a grateful spirit and without objection.
9. If any common people are oppressed by burdens, excessive levies, or humiliations, or forced into shameful actions (such as resisting Russia), they shall be allowed to leave their landlords and possessions and seek refuge in other places or within the lines. Landlords shall not interfere, as this is the supreme will of Her Imperial Majesty.
10. You shall not hinder the other people in any way if they wish to resettle or migrate to Mozdok or other places, since they have never been your subjects. Therefore, you shall allow them to settle in Mozdok and other places, according to the supreme will of Her Imperial Majesty.
11. For all wrongs and injustices committed among yourselves, you must seek justice from the Imperial Majesty's representative, Grand Prince Jankhot. You must not take the law into your own hands, especially avoid revenge, which is contrary to Allah and the teachings of your prophet Muhammad. If any wrongdoing is committed against you by us, you may seek justice through your representative, and full justice will be ensured.
12. The fulfillment of all the claims outlined in all the points is entrusted to Grand Prince Jankhot Tatarkhan and Prince Misost Bematuqo, who must make every effort to fulfill them without any delay and to hand over the collected claims to the Colonel Taganov.
13. "We shall swear allegiance and affix our seals to fulfill all of the above as soon as possible. We accept all these points with gratitude and pledge to fulfill all the commands and decrees of Her Imperial Majesty, as well as to return the requested claims as soon as possible and to do whatever else the owners have indicated with their seals. In confirmation of this obligation, which we promise to fulfill, we swear a sacred oath before the Holy Quran, the almighty Allah, and His great prophet Muhammad, kissing the Quran and affixing our seals."

The Kabardians struggled for a year to meet the Russian demands. In June 1780 the Kabardians paid the 10,000 rubles. The Caucasus Military Administration was given the following order: "Above all, do not allow the mountaineers to unite. If possible, sow chaos among them." Russia continued to strengthen the lines and isolate Kabardia especially from the Western Circassians and Abazins by continuing to build new fortresses. It was decreed not to interfere with the people’s acceptance of Christianity, and a prohibition was imposed on involvement with the Ingush and Ossetians. The Kabardians lost most of their dominance over the Ossetians. Kabardia lost a third of its territory after the war. In the following years, the Kabardian princes tried to regain the lost territories through diplomacy but they were unsuccessful.

The rights conferred upon the common people, which the Russians took advantage of the complaints of the commoners, were intended to diminish the authority of the Kabardian princes, weakening the resistance of the aristocrats by destabilizing the socio-political situation in Kabardia. The requests of the Kabardian aristocrats to settle in other countries were rejected, but after the war some defiant Kabardian aristocrats managed to settle in Kuban region with their subjects while a small portion moved to Kartli-Kakheti at the invitation of King Heraclius II, Russia accused the Georgians of offering refuge to "rebels" and aiding them in seeking asylum in Ottoman Empire. In February 1780, the princes of Lesser Kabardia revolted. The war lasted until spring until the thousands of Lesser Kabardian warriors were defeated, and two of their leaders were captured and imprisoned. In the same year, Russia sealed all kind of border crossings of Georgia after intercepting a letter carried by an Armenian courier, which contained a promise of support for the Princes of the Greater Kabardia against Russia, allegedly sent from the Kingdom of Kartli-Kakheti.

According to Grigory Potemkin, 2,000 of Kabardia's finest warriors were killed, mostly from noble families, and many noble families were completely destroyed. The Seven Months' War is considered a turning point due to the significant loss of the anti-Russian Kabardian aristocracy, the Russian influence on Kabardia and the harsh treaty imposed on the Kabardians. However, it took more than 40 years for Kabardia to fully succumb to Russian control.

== Legacy ==
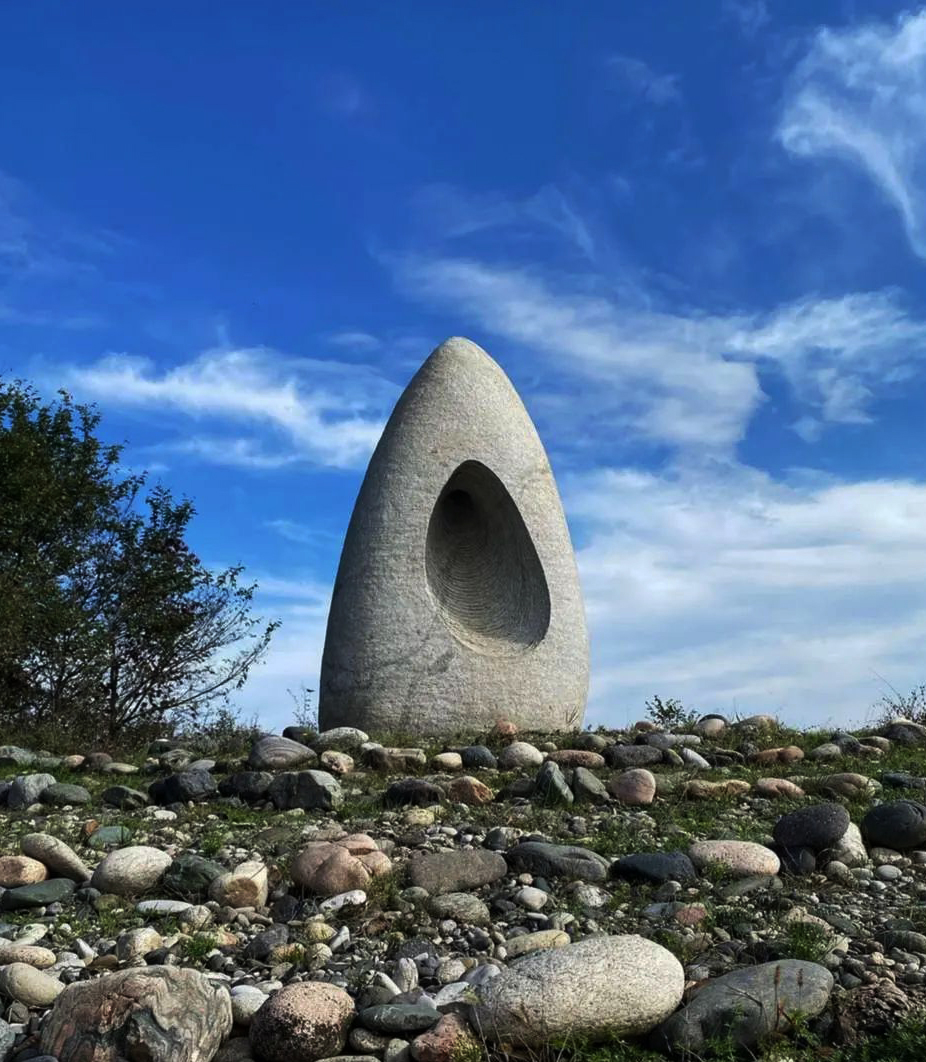
"Way of the Spirit" monument

Many folk songs and laments have been written about the Seven Months' War by Circassians. Even among the other Circassian tribes such as the Shapsug, Bzhedug and Besleney, there are songs about the Night Assault since some Western Circassians also joined the war. Small Circassian cavalry units breaking through encirclements during battles after being surrounded is often recounted in Kabardian folk tales.

Peter Simon Pallas, who visited Kabardia in 1793, noted that in the area where the Battle of Qeytuqo Tuasha took place, there were burial mounds, used as gravestones, containing the slain Kabardian warriors. This tradition of building burial mounds dates back at least to the Medieval Ages and was dedicated to the bravest and most honorable warriors who mostly died for the "freedom of Circassia" in the eyes of the people. These sacred mounds were reserved only for the most famous and courageous fighters and held great respect among the people. According to the custom, anyone who saw a mound with a flag planted on it from a distance would notice the sacred mound and stop to pray there.

In 1820s, Circassian ethnographer Sultan Khan-Giray remarked on the local memory of the battle at Qeytuqo Tuasha, noting a spring associated with the loss of Kabardia’s finest warriors.

After the Russo-Circassian War, despite both the Imperial and Soviet authorities' efforts to suppress Circassian nationalism, the Seven Months' War remained in the collective memory, especially among the locals. In the Soviet era, the subject was largely ignored due to Soviet censorship, as it contradicted the theory of "friendship of peoples." Major historical works mentioned the conflict only briefly and summarized it with a single sentence: "In 1779, the Kabardian princes pledged loyalty to Russia" or sometimes never mentioned. Although it began to fade from memory by the 1990s, Circassian intellectuals of Adyghe Khase took initiatives and did researchs to restore the war’s place in the collective memory and they organized commemorative ceremonies in Qeytuqo Tuasha.

The first commemoration of the Seven Months' War was held in October 10, 1996 (1994 in other sources), in Qeytuqo Tuasha by a group of Circassian nationalists and intellectuals. In 1997, commemorations continued with a larger group, and a memorial was mounted along with the Circassian flag being planted. In the years that followed, Circassians continued to visit the area. Over time, this commemoration became a tradition. In 2014, an initiative was launched to create a memorial in honor of the Circassians who lost their lives in the war. However, on October 10, 2015, the planned memorial was delayed by the authorities without any official statement. Circassian activist Martin Kochesoko stated that the monument was ready, but permission for its mounting has been denied, and it has been under inspection by a commission formed specifically for this purpose.

The new monument made from granite and 3-meters long, which is named the "Way of the Spirit" was later designed by sculptor Arsen Gushapsha, the creator of the previous memorial. Permission to open the monument was repeatedly denied and security forces disrupted commemorative activities. On October 10, 2018, a commemoration event was held for the unveiling of the monument, attended only by the public with no officials present. During the commemoration, the main vocalist of the Hagauj Band, Tembolat Tkhashloko, performed one of the folkloric Night Assault songs. Seven circles were made around the monument from stones collected from the riverbank, representing seven generations of the past.

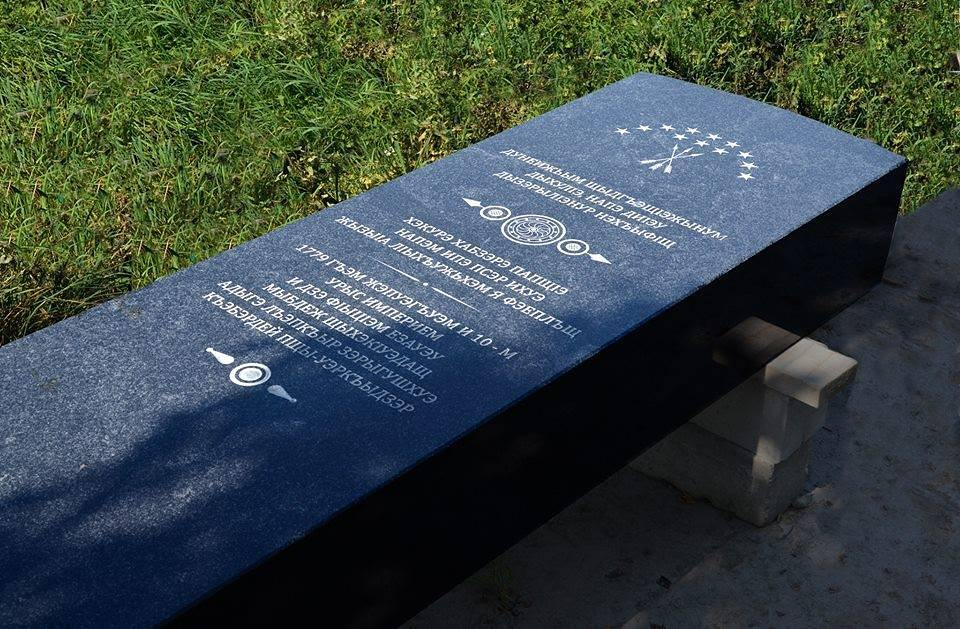
The unmounted memorial

Inscription on the unmounted memorial

"We are ready to die to be remembered in this old world,

It is better for us to die with honor."

"For our homeland and Khabze,

Honor comes before life."

In memory of the heroes who said these words,

On October 10, 1779,

Fighting against the dark army of the Russian Empire,

And perishing here,

The Kabardian princely-noble army, which brought pride to the Circassian nation.

=== Songs ===
Although there is no standard version of the Circassian songs, most of the surviving songs are narratively based on Tawqo Tlepshiqo's Night Assault song. The table does not include all the songs and their versions that have survived to the present day.

For the Battle of the Night Assault, the Russians composed a song titled "The Kabardians' Assault on the Marinskaya Fortress" presents the event from the Circassians' perspective, ironically highlighting their attempt to seize the fortress without adequate siege equipment.

Kabardian Songs
| Song | Translated Lyrics | Recordings |
|---|---|---|
| Къэбэрдей жэщтеуэм и уэрэд | Song of the Kabardian Night Assault | Ziramuk Kardengush |
| Къэбэрдей жэщтеуэм и уэрэд | Song of the Kabardian Night Assault | Vladimir Baragun |
| Къэбэрдей жэщтеуэм и уэрэд (diff. ver.) | Song of the Kabardian Night Assault | Hagauj Band |
| Къэбэрдей жэщтеуэм и уэрэд (diff. ver.) | Song of the Kabardian Night Assault | Written only |
| Къэбэрдей жэщтеуэ | Kabardian Night Assault | Hagauj Band |
| Жэщтеуэ | The Night Assault | Written only |
| Царское завоевание | The Tsar's Invasion | Written only in Russian |

Bzhedug Songs
| Song | Translated Lyrics | Recordings |
|---|---|---|
| Къэбэртаемэ ячэщтеу | Night Assault of the Kabardians | Čerkesskij hor, 1911 Čerkesskij hor, 1911 Čerkesskij hor, 1911 |
| Къэбэртаемэ ячэщтеу | Night Assault of the Kabardians | Kazbek Nagaroko |
| Къэбэртаемэ ячэщтео | Night Assault of the Kabardians | Written only |

The Shapsug Song
| Song | Translated Lyrics | Recordings |
|---|---|---|
| Чэщтеом иорэд | Song of the Night Assault | Written only |

The Russian Song
| Song | Translated Lyrics | Recordings |
|---|---|---|
| Набег кабардинцев на крепость Марьевскую | The Kabardians' Assault on the Marinskaya Fortress | Written only |

Kabardian Poem
| Poem | Translated Lyrics | Poet |
|---|---|---|
| Мазибл зауэр | The Seven Months' War | Khabas Beshtokov |

== Images ==
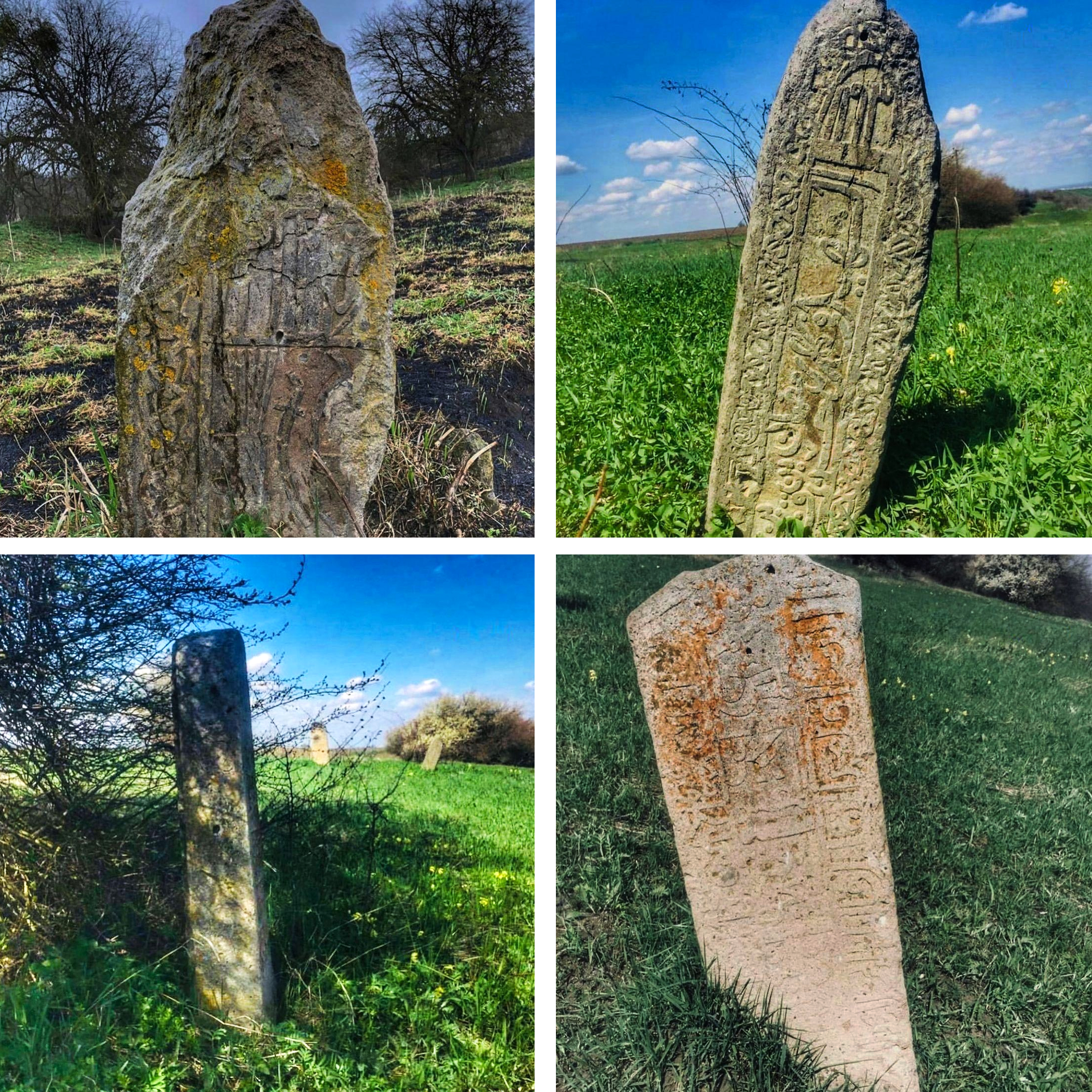
A Circassian graveyard near Fanduko River including those who killed in this war.
