= Jankhot II of Kabardia =

Jankhot Tatarkhan

Grand Prince of Kabardia
- Reign: 1773–1785
- Predecessor: Qasey Hatokhshoqo
- Successor: Misost the Great
- Born: Unknown; Kabardia
- Died: 1785; Kabardia
- Issue: Sons: Kushuk Jankhot; Qrimjeriy; Daughters: Unnamed daughter
Names
- Jankhot, son of Tatarkhan
- Kabardian: Тэтэрхъан и къуэ Жанхъуэт
- House: Inalid dynasty; House of Bechmirza
- Father: Tatarkhan the Golden

Jankhot Tatarkhan (Kabardian: Тэтэрхъан Жанхъуэт) was a Kabardian prince and Grand Prince of Kabardia from 1773 until his death. A representative of the Kashkatau princely faction, he played a significant role in the political affairs of Kabardia during the mid-to-late 18th century, particularly in the conflicts surrounding the construction of the Russian fortress of Mozdok, the rivalry between the Baksan and Kashkatau parties, and relations between Kabardia, the Russian Empire, and the Crimean Khanate. Unlike many contemporary Kabardian princes, Jankhot generally pursued a cautious and pragmatic political course, avoiding direct participation in several major military confrontations with Russia while attempting to preserve Kabardian autonomy and influence.

== Biography ==
Jankhot Tatarkhan was first mentioned in 1744 in a letter from the Kashkatau party of Kabardian princes to Elizabeth Petrovna requesting the return of fugitive peasants. Among the signatories of the letter was “Dzhakhot-bek Tatarkhanov.” In the register of noble Kashkatau estate owners who swore allegiance to Russia, sent to the office of the Kizlyar commandant I. L. Frauendorf in 1753, Jankhot's signature appears second. On December 12, 1763, the Kizlyar commandant, Major General N. A. Potapov, issued a secret instruction ordering Captain Ivan Meshcheryakov to travel to Greater Kabardia on December 19 to meet with Qasey Hatokhshoqo. After speaking with Meshcheryakov, Qasey ordered all princes and nobles to attend a meeting. Two weeks later, the leaders of both princely factions arrived, numbering around one hundred people, including Jankhot himself. The issues of fugitive peasants and the construction of Mozdok were discussed. Meshcheryakov argued that the Kabardians “unfairly consider the Mozdok tract to belong to their own region, because it is definitely Russian, and not theirs... and therefore there is no danger for them to recognize it, and even more so, there should be no consideration of any oppression through it...”. The Kabardians objected, recalling that Emperor Peter the Great had allowed them to possess lands on the Satei plain along the Terek River below Mozdok, and they continued to insist on the destruction of the fortress and the return of the fugitives. In 1767, a decree of the Collegium of Foreign Affairs confirmed the receipt of reports from N. A. Potapov concerning a meeting of the Khasa of Kabardian feudal lords, where the issue of withdrawing from Russian allegiance due to the construction of the Mozdok fortress and the refusal to return peasants who had fled there was discussed. The khasa convened on March 12 and continued again on March 17. Those assembled particularly insisted on “distancing themselves from the Russian side and being under Crimean protection, in common with the Kuban Nogais.” This position, however, was not supported by Jankhot.

On July 11, 1767, Major Pyotr Tatarov reported to N. A. Potapov about a peasant uprising in Beshtamak that erupted after a gathering of princes at the Bechmirza cemetery. The Kuban Nogai murza Sokur-Khadzhi attended the gathering. The owners Qasey Hatokhshoqo, Hamirza Qeytuqo, Misost Bematuqo, Jankhot Tatarkhan, and others proposed resettling the chogars (peasants) beyond the Kuma River in order to make escape to Mozdok and Kizlyar more difficult. The peasants were promised that they would “no longer be subject to oppression.”

In 1769, Jankhot reported to Kizlyar that:

“…according to the order of his lord major general and Kizlyar commandant (N. A. Potapov), also his Dzhankhot, the Kabardian owners Kasai Atazhukin with his family name, Dzhankhot Sidakov with his brothers, Kazi Kaisinov with his brothers, Niyatsha and Musa Karamurzin, Mamatkirey Alimurzin with his son and others, also the Uzden Kudenetovs and Tambievs and the people all bowed down to the allegiance of Her Imperial Majesty and swore an oath to remain in the service of Her Imperial Majesty for the rest of their lives and in loyalty, as their ancestors were and served faithfully, and then they all moved to Baksan.”

In the same year, when Misost Bematuqo retreated to the mountains and many of his subjects fled, Jankhot led them back to Baksan.

In 1773, Jankhot was elected as the new Grand Prince of Kabardia following the death of Qasey Hatokhshoqo.

Jankhot did not participate in the clashes of 1778–1779, during which the forces of General Ivan Yakobi inflicted a major defeat on the Kabardians at the Malka River. Instead, he pursued a cautious political course. He retained his authority and position as grand prince while avoiding direct involvement in military campaigns that appeared unwinnable. His policy appears to have focused on minimizing losses during the gradual integration of Kabardia into the Russian sphere of influence.

In August 1782, Jankhot and other princes and uzdens expressed in writing their dissatisfaction with the construction of fortresses and stanitsas along the Mozdok Line, including Prokhladnaya (1775), Georgievskaya (1777), Pavlovskaya (1778), Soldatskaya (1779), Aleksandrovskaya (1780), Maryinskaya (1780), and others.

The last known mention of Jankhot Bekmurzin appears in a document dated 1783. He died in 1785 and was succeeded by Misost the Great.

== Sources ==
- Kardanov, Ch. E. (2016). Князья Кабарды [Princes of Kabarda] (in Russian). Nalchik: Izdatel'stvo M. i V. Kotlyarovykh. ISBN 978-5-93680-971-2.
