= Foundation of Mozdok =

Construction of a Russian fortress in the North Caucasus in 1763

- Part of the Russo-Circassian War
Date	1763
Location	Mozdok, Kabardia
Result	Russian victory
Territorial changes	The fortress was successfully founded

Belligerents
(Russia) Russian Empire	Kabardia (East Circassia)

Commanders and leaders
(Russia) Catherine II	Qasey Hatokhshoqo; Misost the Great; Hamirza Qeytuqo; Alejuqo Hatokhshoqo; Mukul-Ali Yislambech; Jembulat Qeytuqo; Qanamat Yelbezduqo; Beslan Hamirza; Muhammad Batoqo

The foundation of Mozdok in 1763 marked a critical event in the early phases of the Russo-Circassian War. The construction of this fortress by the Russian Empire was a strategic move to establish a foothold in the North Caucasus, provoking resistance from the Circassian tribes, particularly the Kabardians. This event is often considered a precursor to the long and bloody conflict between Russia and the indigenous peoples of the Caucasus.

== Background ==
During the reign of Catherine II, the Imperial Russian Army began its incursion into Circassian soil as part of a broader strategy to expand Russian influence and control over the Caucasus. This plan included the construction of a series of forts to secure the region and facilitate the annexation of Circassian lands.

On 17 July (O.S.), 1763, Russian forces entered the town of Mezdeug (modern-day Mozdok) in Eastern Circassia. The village was occupied, and Mozdok was converted into a heavily fortified Russian base. Families of Volga Cossacks were settled in stanitsas (Cossack villages) around Mozdok to secure the area and establish a permanent Russian presence.

For the Circassians, the foundation of Mozdok marked the beginning of hostilities with the Russian Empire. While some Kabardian nobles argued for immediate resistance, hoping to secure the support of the Ottoman Empire and the Crimean Khanate, others advocated for negotiation and an attempt to avoid war. Despite the internal divisions, many Circassians viewed the establishment of Mozdok as an act of aggression and a violation of their sovereignty.

== Construction and resistance ==
The fortress was constructed under heavy military protection, with Russian engineers and troops working to secure the site against potential attacks. Circassian warriors launched frequent raids during the building process, attempting to disrupt the work and drive out the Russian forces. These early skirmishes demonstrated the Circassians’ willingness to resist Russian expansion at all costs.

The settlement of Volga Cossacks around Mozdok further inflamed tensions, as it symbolized the permanent nature of Russian encroachment into Circassian lands. The Kabardian tribes, particularly those in Eastern Circassia, became increasingly united in their opposition to the Russian presence.

== Aftermath ==
The foundation of Mozdok was a turning point in Russian-Circassian relations. It symbolized the beginning of a deliberate Russian campaign to dominate the North Caucasus, setting the stage for the Russo-Circassian War, which would last for over a century.

Mozdok became a strategic military base for future Russian campaigns in the region and a focal point of Circassian resistance. While the fortress remained in Russian hands, the Kabardians and other Circassian tribes continued to challenge Russian control, employing guerrilla tactics and engaging in periodic large-scale battles.

The establishment of Mozdok solidified Russia’s presence in the North Caucasus, but it also entrenched hostility between the empire and the Circassian peoples. The foundation of the fortress marked the beginning of decades of conflict, as the Circassians organized sustained resistance to Russian domination.

== See also ==
- Mozdok
- Russo-Circassian War
- Russian imperialism
