= Hatokhshoqo III of Kabardia =

Supreme Prince of Kabardia

Hatokhshoqo Hamirza

Grand Prince of Kabardia
- Reign: 1788–1806
- Predecessor: Misost the Great
- Successor: Hatokhshoqo Misost
- Born: Unknown; Kabardia
- Died: 1806; Kabardia
Names
- Hatokhshoqo, son of Hamirza
- Kabardian: Хьэмырзэ и къуэ ХьэтIохъущокъуэ
- House: Inalid dynasty; House of Qeytuqo
- Father: Hamirza Qeytuqo

Hatokhshoqo Hamirza (Kabardian: Хьэмырзэ ХьэтIохъущокъуэ) was a Kabardian prince and military leader who served as a senior noble of Kabardia during the late 18th century. He took part in the Russo-Turkish War (1787–1792) as an officer in Russian service, later becoming one of the prominent figures in Kabardian political and military affairs during a period of increasing Russian influence in the North Caucasus.

== Biography ==
His father, Prince Hamirza Qeytuqo, who had taken an active part in the Seven Months' War, was killed in one of the clashes (1778) near Georgievsk.

The name of Hatokhshoqo Hamirza first appears in documents related to the creation of the Kabardian zemstvo army during the Russo-Turkish War (1787–1792). O. L. Opryshko writes about this prince in his book Through Centuries and Fates. According to him, Hatokhshoqo "was quite an interesting character," who attracted the attention of P. S. Potemkin, who visited the prince at the viceroyalty, then located in Georgiyevsk. Hatokhshoqo gazed with amazement at the luxuriously furnished rooms, the ballroom, and the audience halls, and asked the governor why he alone needed such a large residence. P. S. Potemkin asked the prince if he would like to live in such a house. Hamurza replied that he would not trade his modest dwelling for the most luxurious European home. "In large houses," he said, "the walls are cleared away, but the heart is entangled; it seems that both the mind and the heart are built into the house. But we enjoy the open air, and I can easily transport my hut throughout the vast expanse of the land where our people have the power to roam." A worthy response. And the governor sums it up: "That's the way everyone thinks." In a brief description of the Kabardian peoples, P. S. Potemkin wrote in 1784: "...the eldest and richest owner lives practically in a hut; luxury has not yet crept into the hearts of these people. They value gold and silver as nothing or very little; on the contrary, they value all armor and weapons as precious..." And more about the people: "...the extreme state of each of these peoples requires special care, to provide them with some rule for their general governance and for the mutual relations between them. For the situation cannot remain in this state, but must either change for the better or end with the complete destruction of the Kabardian people. But I hope that God will bless the efforts of the mediator who seeks to establish this brave people... Until the morals of the Kabardians deteriorated, they were in many ways like ancient Lacedaemon, remnants of which were still visible. Chivalry is the object of glory for everyone..." Hatokhshoqo was an active participant in the fighting during the Russo-Turkish War. He commanded a "pocketed" cavalry detachment with the rank of premier major. In the report of Brigadier Ivan Bolshoi Gorich dated January 3, the commander of the Caucasian Corps, P. A. Tekelli, was told about the campaign in Trans-Kuban, in which Hatokhshoqo participated.

Prince Hatokhshoqo returned to his homeland in February 1788 and passed on important information about the enemy to Brigadier Gorich. Thus, Prime Major Hatokhshoqo's uncle, Mamatdjery, informed the prince of the transfer of a fifteen-thousand-strong Turkish army with artillery to Sudzhuk-Kale, where the cannons had already been transported and the three-bunchu pasha was in charge. Mamatdjery persistently suggested to his nephew that, given the strength of the Turks, he defect to their side. Hatokhshoqo decisively rejected the offer, saying that "as he had dedicated himself to eternal loyalty to the Russian throne, he not only did not refuse, but while still there, he tried to persuade many, including the fleeing Mansur murzas," to accept Russian citizenship. Zanov conveyed to Hamirza information about the Sultan's intention to introduce a forty-five-thousand-strong army into the Crimean possessions in order to recapture the lost lands from the Russians. Governor Popov of the Caucasus sent a list of those who distinguished themselves in the Trans-Kuban campaign to General-in-Chief I. V. Gudovich, commander of the Caucasus forces. First on this list is Hatokhshoqo Hamirza Qeytuqo, the Grand Prince of Kabardia, who was promoted to lieutenant colonel with "salary according to rank." The presentation of Hatokhshoqo Qeytuqo states:

"A premier-major of the Russian service, the most powerful ruler in his region, upon the arrival of Major General Gorich in Kabarda, he, along with his son, brothers, Uzdens, and his army, immediately presented himself out of loyalty to the Russian Imperial throne and, being in this position, urged his fellow countrymen and other peoples to maintain peace and tranquility, in which he was completely successful, and took many Russian prisoners from them."

In 1788 and 1791, he "distinguished himself in battles" in the open mountains near Anapa and beyond the Danube. Returning to Kabardia after the end of military operations (1792), Hatokhshoqo found the situation tense due to the strengthening of the tsarist authorities' colonial policy. He sided with the anti-Russian forces.

Tribal courts and courts of justice, introduced as new organs of tsarist administration in Kabardia, sought to regulate customary legal norms and placed formal limits on the authority of the Kabardian princes. They were forbidden "to leave the borders of Russia without the permission of the chief military commander in the region, to arbitrarily take revenge on murderers, to harbor criminals under the guise of hospitality... to convene public assemblies (khasa) without the express order and instruction of tribal courts and courts of justice." These measures altered established practices of governance. The situation in Kabardia, which I. V. Gudovich initially described as stable, was disrupted by a rebellion of Kabardian princes in 1794. On September 22, 1794, Gudovich reported to Urakov:

"Since this people has long been accustomed to atrocities, without feeling the benefit from it and the monarch's care for their well-being, in the past July and August, some of the Kabardian owners and uzdens, some due to misunderstanding and frivolity, and others due to the rigidity of their morals, held gatherings prohibited against the establishment of clan Courts and Punishments in Greater Kabarda and uttered various absurd words and advice among themselves at these meetings, and among these people, especially the assessors of the established Courts and Punishments participated in this"

Gudovich attributed the unrest to a combination of misunderstanding, differing attitudes among the population, and resistance to the newly introduced institutions. Other interpretations emphasize the broader impact of administrative reforms on established political and social structures.

Correspondence of the period indicates that, throughout 1795, Kabardian groups continued raids along Russian frontiers, while also demanding the removal of the tribal Courts and Punishments from Kabardia and proposing their replacement with institutions based on local customs. The unrest continued into 1796. In a report to the Empress on June 25, Gudovich stated that Kabardian forces, numbering up to 2,000, "having hastily crossed from Kabarda above the outposts of the Malku River under the mountains, approached the Konstantinovskaya fortress at dawn..." The initial attack was repelled. A subsequent attempt was also checked, including through the actions of Kabardian groups aligned with Bechmirza of the Jambolet houses and other princes, who sought to restrain the rebellion and requested military support. The imperial administration responded by attempting to contain the unrest and isolate its leading participants. In a report by Count Zubov to Gudovich dated January 10, 1795, it was stated:

"Consequently, Her Majesty has deigned to order the owners named by General Gudovich in the report: Lieutenant Colonel Atazhuk Hamurzin and Izmail Atazhukin and the latter's brother, Premier Major Adilgirey Atazhukin, to be sent to Yekaterinoslavl with maintenance, until Her Majesty pleases to make another determination regarding their participation"

In 1798, Hatokhshoqo Hamirza, at his request, was again accepted into service under Lieutenant General Gorich the Younger. The prince was soon promoted to colonel. He died in 1806.

== Sources ==
- Kardanov, Ch. E. (2016). Князья Кабарды [Princes of Kabarda] (in Russian). Nalchik: Izdatel'stvo M. i V. Kotlyarovykh. ISBN 978-5-93680-971-2.
- Beituganov, S. N. (2007). Кабарда: история и фамилии [Kabarda: History and Surnames] (in Russian). Nalchik: Elbrus. ISBN 978-5-7680-2113-9.
