= Khasa =

Khasa may refer to:

- Khasas, an ancient tribe of the Indian subcontinent
  - Khasas (Mahabharata), the Khasa tribe as mentioned in the ancient Indian epic Mahabharata
- Khasa Kingdom, an ancient kingdom in western Nepal and northern India
- Khasa Prakrit, a Prakrit (Middle Indo-Aryan) language of medieval South Asia, ancestor of modern Nepali, Kumaoni, Garhwali and Dogri among others
- Khas people, an Indo-Aryan ethno-linguistic people of Nepal
- Khasa River, a tributary of the Tigris on whose banks stands the city of Kirkuk
- Khasa (cloth), a type of cotton fabric made in the Mughal Empire
- Zhangmu (Nepali: Khasa), a town in Nyalam County, Tibet
