= Turkish-Crimean Invasion of Kabardia (1774) =

Ottoman military campaign

- Part of Russo-Turkish War (1768–1774) and Crimean-Circassian wars
| Date | Spring – August 1774 |
| Location | Kabardia, North Caucasus |
| Result | Russo–Circassian–Ossetian victory: End of Crimean-Circassian wars |
| Territorial changes | Ottoman expansion into Caucasia halted |

Belligerents
| Kabardia (Eastern Circassia); Ossetians; Supported by: Russian Empire | Ottoman Empire; Crimean Khanate |

Commanders and leaders
| Jankhot Tatarkhan; Qasey Dolet (Russian Empire) Eugene Medem | (Crimean Khanate) Devlet IV Giray |

Strength
| ~4,500 | ~15,000 |

Casualties and losses
| Heavy | Heavy |

The Turkish-Crimean Invasion of Kabardia (1774) was a military campaign carried out by the forces of the Ottoman Empire and the Crimean Khanate against Kabardia and Ossetian societies inhabiting the region.

== History ==
In early 1774, Devlet-Giray’s army landed near the fortress of Sudzhuk-Kale (modern Novorossiysk). The army, estimated at around 15,000 men, included Ottoman soldiers, Crimean Tatars, and detachments of local North Caucasian groups. The campaign aimed to reassert influence over Kabardia while Russia was engaged on other fronts of the ongoing war. Several Kabardian leaders, including Jankhot Tatarkhan and Dolet Qasey, requested military support against the approaching forces.

=== Battle of Beshtamak ===
In 1774, during the ongoing Russo-Circassian War, a Crimean army of many thousands invaded Kabarda and laid siege to Mozdok. In the Beshtamak area and on the Gundelen River Kabardian cavalry defeated the Crimeans who suffered a devastating loss as many men got cornered and massacred meanwhile the tatars and alliance suffered around 2,000 casualties in the battle.

=== Battle of Mozdok ===
After Battle of Beshtamak, Ossetians and Kabardians, together with Russian troops, in a battle near Mozdok against the Crimean-Turkish army, Near Mozdok, which suffered a defeat. Later that year, in the village of Küçük Kaynarca, a peace treaty was signed between the Ottoman Turkey and the Russia. According to the Treaty of Küçük Kaynarca, Ossetia became part of Russia.

=== Baksan and Gundelen battle ===
The retreating Ottoman–Crimean detachments regrouped and moved into the Baksan Gorge. Russian and Kabardian forces pursued them, and on 27 August 1774, an engagement occurred near the confluence of the Baksan River and Gundelen River. The battle resulted in the further withdrawal of Devlet-Giray’s forces toward the Black Sea coast.

== Aftermath ==
During the campaign, Kabardians allied with Russian forces to resist the invading troops of Devlet IV Giray. Their joint victory at Beshtamak, Baksan Gorge and Gundelen area crushed the Ottoman-Crimean army. Shortly afterward, the Russo-Turkish War (1768–1774) ended with the Treaty of Küçük Kaynarca, by which the Ottoman Empire recognized Crimean independence under Russian influence and renounced its claims to Kabardia.
