= Khasa River =

Winterbourne river in Iraq

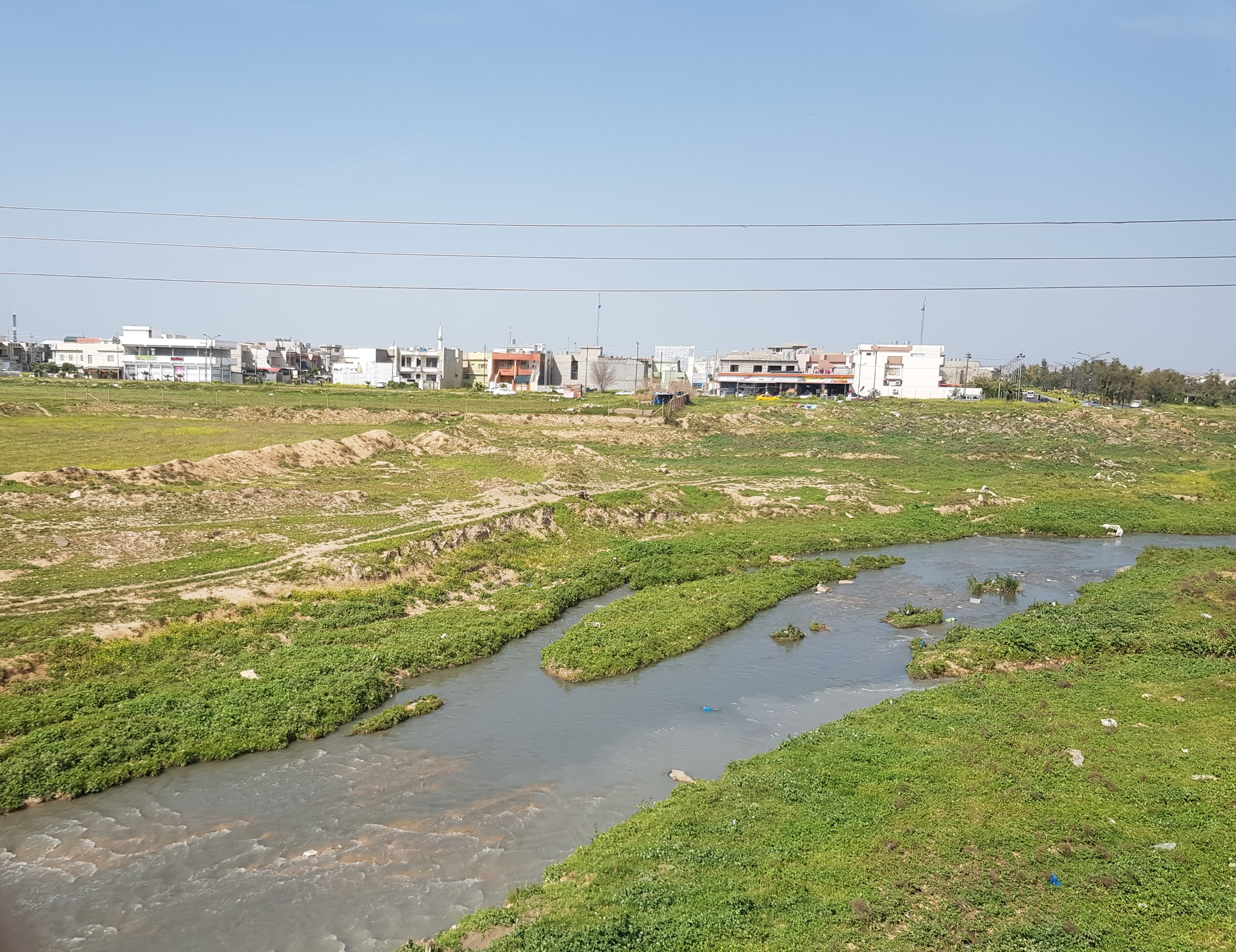
- Khasa River in the south of Kirkuk city
- Native name: نهر خاصة (Arabic)

Location
- Country: Iraq, Kirkuk Governorate

Physical characteristics
- Mouth
  - coordinates: 34°55′N 44°05′E

The Khasa River (Arabic: نهر خاصة, Kurdish: ڕووباری/چەمی خاسە) is a river which runs through the City of Kirkuk in northern Iraq., as happened in the 1950s. The river has a symbolic value to the city's inhabitants. It is one of the tributaries of the Tigris River.

== Sources ==
- Kirkuk
