= Hamirza Qeytuqo =

Circassian prince of Qeytuqo dynasty

Prince Hamirza Qeytuqo
- Хьэмырзэ Къетыкъуэ
- Born: 1705; Kabardia
- Died: 21 June [O.S. 10 June] 1779; Kabardia
- Children: Aslanjeriy; Beslan; Bechmirza; Hatokhshoqo; Biraslan; Ismel
- Military career
- Allegiance: Kabardia
- Nickname: The Short
- Conflicts: Russo-Circassian War: Seven Months' War; Russo-Turkish War (1768–1774)

Hamirza Qeytuqo (Kabardian: Хьэмырзэ Къетыкъуэ, Russian: Хамурза Асланбеков), was a Kabardian prince and the eldest of the four sons of Grand Prince Aslanbek Qeytuqo.

== Biography ==
Since the Circassians didn't write their own history and all information comes from external sources, details about Hamirza's youth are mostly unknown. As the eldest son, he attended the Grand Council of Kabardia alongside his father Aslanbek. When their father died in 1746, Hamirza and his brothers inherited part of the family lands.

Hamirza's grandfather, Qeytuqo, accepted a Besleney community escaping from the attacks of the Crimean Khanate to settle in his lands at the end of the 17th century, and thus two Besleney villages were established named Mahuqo and Dohchuqo. Mahuqo later passed to Aslanbek's brother Jembulat by inheritance, and the village of Dohchuqo passed to Aslanbek and after his death to Hamirza and his brothers.

At the end of the 1740s, the Crimean Khan Arslan Giray made an ultimatum demanding that the Besleneys who had taken refuge in Kabardia be handed over to him. The Russian Empress Elizaveta Petrovna sent an armed force to Kabardia to prevent Kabardia from entering the war and demanded that the Kabardians fulfill Arslan Giray's demands. Hamirza and his brothers agreed with their uncle Jembulat and wrote a letter of protest to the Czarina regarding this demand, which they considered unjust.

The letter includes the following statements:

"The village had fought the Crimean Khan multiple times, and its elders—both senior and junior—were put to the sword. Later, the same atrocity was attempted for a third time. When the villagers heard about this, they scattered and fled to save their lives… Our grandfather Qeytuqo called them down from the mountains, offering them safety under oath. However, at that time, they were so impoverished that they couldn’t even sow crops. Our grandfather fed them with his own grain for eight years, arranged their marriages, and provided everything they needed to survive."

Following Aslanbek’s death, internal conflicts and tensions in Kabardia resurfaced in 1747. Prince Hamirza became a significant figure by maintaining and consolidating control over his inherited lands. During these conflicts, Prince Kurghoqo Kanchoqo of Lesser Kabardia accused Hamirza of forcibly taking his slave, Biley. Hamirza, however, claimed that Biley had come to him of his own free will. Biley had sought refuge with Hamirza after killing Prince Mirzabek Chepaniqo, and in return, a ransom of 60 slaves was paid. In 1753, noble warriors loyal to Hamirza were sent to protect the territories of the Abazins, who were their vassals. When the Russian captain Barkovski complained about the presence of Kabardians in the lands of the Abazins, who were loyal to the Crimean Khan, Prince Hamirza replied that the princes were not on the side of the Crimea, but were there to protect the Abazins, who were loyal to them.

=== Russo-Circassian War ===
From the 1750s, real power in Greater Kabardia was held by the coalition made up of the Hatokhshoqo, Misost, and Bechmirza families. Hamirza, whose Qeytuqo family had been left out and isolated for ten years before the war, signed a deal as revenge. In this deal, he accepted Mozdok as Russian land in return for a large amount of money. In January 1764, he attended a meeting held in Greater Kabardia to discuss the Mozdok issue. As a result, a letter signed by Hamirza, opposing the Russian claim to Mozdok and stating that the escaped peasants should be returned, reached St. Petersburg with the embassy in June. In a meeting held in April 1767 between the representatives of the princely families of Greater Kabardia (including the Qeytuqo dynasty), it was decided by mutual agreement that the Grand Prince Qasey Atajuq would be obeyed in all matters. However, around 10,000 peasants from the slave class did not obey their lords and left their lands, settling in the Pyatigorsk region. Although the princes could not stop the rebellion, an agreement was reached with the rebels, including with the Grand Prince. On July 4, Hamirza Qeytuqo, along with other leading princes like Misost Bematiqo, helped move the peasants from Pyatigorsk to the Kuma region, which brought the rebellion to an end.

In the Treaty of Karasubazar, signed between the Crimean Khanate and Russia in 1772, it was declared that Kabardia should be subject to Russia. Prominent Kabardian princes, including Hamirza, began to increase their pressure on the destruction of Mozdok with their supporters. At the beginning of 1773, the Kabardians, led by Misost Bematiqo, began preparing for an attack against Mozdok. Representatives sent by Misost Bematiqo and Hamirza Qeytuqo offered an alliance against Russia to Devlet Giray, who had just been appointed in Istanbul as the new Crimean Khan, in opposition to Sahib Giray, who had signed a peace treaty with the Russians.

In 1774, the Kabardian army, including Hamirza, spread to the banks of the Malka River with the Tatars. Many volunteers from the surrounding areas joined the army, but the strongest support came from the well-armed Kabardian cavalry. At the council meeting of Shahbaz Giray, the commanders of the combined army and Nekrasov's Cossacks were present. The plan for the attack on Mozdok was discussed. Kurghoqo Tatarkhan and the Kabardians under his leadership suggested attacking the fortress. Both Bematiqo and Hamirza said at the council meeting that Mozdok should be destroyed. With the attacks from the Crimean and Kabardian alliance, fierce battles began around the Mozdok line from early summer 1774 and continued until the Treaty of Küçük Kaynarca.

==== Seven Months' War ====
The most important battle he took part in was the Seven Months' War. Russia started building the fortified Azov-Mozdok Line in 1777, which took over Kabardia’s most important pastures and plateaus in north. Almost the entire population was economically affected by the line. Despite the strong demands of the Kabardian princes, the line was not removed. Bematiqo and Hamirza became the main organizers of the war and took part in the national council held on March 29, 1779. While some of their most important lands had also fallen into Russian hands. During the council, Hamirza was chosen as the commander of one of the three main armies. His cousin Yelbezduqo was also chosen to be responsible for intelligence affairs.

On June 5, 1779, Hamirza divided his army of approximately 6,000 into three and simultaneously attacked the reinforcement units trying to join General Yakobi, Yakobi's camp, and the Pavlovsk Fortress, then retreated. After a failed attack on Pavlovsk, on June 8, they began to lay siege to Marinskaya fortress. During the siege, with the arrival of allied forces, they increased the pressure on the fortress.

=== Death ===
On June 10, Yakobi left Pavlovsk with his army to lift the siege of Marinskaya by Hamirza and formed a battle formation towards Marinskaya. This event is called as the Battle of Night Assault by the Circassians, Hamirza died in the battle with his son Ismel and grandson Ajdjeriy. Yakobi managed to lift the siege.

== Legacy ==
Hamirza is mentioned in almost all folk songs about the Seven Months' War, especially in the song 'Night Assault' written by Tawqo Tlepsihqo, the chief bard of the Qeytuqo dynasty.

In one of the folk songs he was mentioned as follows:

"He had an open gaze and was generous throughout his lifetime.

When donating livestock, never regretted it.

In his old age, he partook in the Seven Months' War.

'These are infidels, and whoever dies [fighting them] is shahid', saying this, he encourages your unit.

The one before whose a large cannonball exploded in front of his tent,

The one whose end came in the Night Assault,"

[It is] Hamirza, of the Qeytuqo's"
