= Misost the Great =

Supreme prince of Kabardian 1785 - 1788

Misost Bematuqo
- Misost the Great

Grand Prince of Kabardia
- Reign: 1785 – 1788
- Predecessor: Jankhot Tatarkhan
- Successor: Hatokhshoqo Hamirza
- Born: 1716; Kabardia
- Died: 1788; Kabardia
- Issue: Bechmirza; Temirbolet; Aslanbech; Hatokhshoqo; Aslandjeriy
Names
- Misost, son of Bemat
- Kabardian: Бэмат и къуэ Мысост
- House: Inalid dynasty; House of Hatokhshoqo
- Father: Bemat Kurghoqo
- Religion: Sunni Islam

Misost Bematuqo (Kabardian: Бэматыкъуэ Мысост, Russian: Мисост Баматов) also known as Misost the Great (Kabardian: Мисостышхуэ) was the Grand Prince of Kabardia between 1785 and 1788. He was a part of the Hatokhshoqo dynasty. His grandfather was Kurghoqo Hatokhshoqo.

== Biography ==
He opposed the construction of the Mozdok fortress on Circassian lands, and saw it as a Russia invasion of Circassia.

In January 1764, Kabardian nobles including Bematuqo met with the representative of the Russian Kizlyar, commandant Major General N. A. Potapov, and unsuccessfully demanded the demolition of the fortress. The Kabardian princes threatened to seek an alliance with the Crimean Khan against Russia.

In June 1767, Bematuqo, then a military commander, launched a military operation against Russia, but many other Kabardian nobles preferred to surrender. In the middle of 1768, fifteen Kabardian princes reported to Kizlyar that they were ready to "take an oath" of allegiance to Russia. Misost Bematuqo, not wanting to surrender or convert to Christianity, refused.

Bematuqo's resistance was strengthened on October 18, 1768, when the Ottoman Sultan, who had declared war on Russia, sent a letter to Bematuqo stating that he, as caliph, ordered that the Muslim peoples of the Caucasus should officially go to war with Russia, obey the Crimean Khan as their commander, and together with the Nogais, defeat Russia. In December 1768, Muhammad-aga, the personal envoy of the Crimean Khan, arrived in Kabarda. The Crimean Khan asked the Kabardian princes to help the Kuban Serasker in the upcoming campaign. In January 1769, the Kizlyar commandant, N. A. Potapov, wrote to Bematuqo.

In June 1769, most Kabardian nobles opposed to war with Russia surrendered. However, Bematuqo, along with some others, refused.

The anti-Russian group was headed by Bematuqo. He and his supporters moved to the upper reaches of the Kumy river. Bematuqo and his associates, in need of allies, turned to Crimean Khan Devlet VI Giray for help. Khan sent a small Tatar detachment to help them, commanded by the son of the Kuban Serasker Kazy Giray. The detachment of Crimeans arrived late, as Russian lieutenant general Johann de Medem sent detachments of Cossacks and Kalmyk cavalry armed with guns against the Kabardians. In an unequal battle on the river Eshkokon, Russian forces defeated the Kabardians.

In 1771, envoys arrived in Kabarda from the Crimean Khan, who met with Bematuqo. They reported false information about the allegedly successful affairs of the Turkish troops in other theaters.

In 1772, Kabardian princes Misost Bematuqo and Hamirza Qeytuqo sent an envoy to Devlet-Girey, calling him to their place in Kabarda for joint actions to “exterminate” the fortress of Mozdok and the entire Caucasian line. In June 1774, the Crimean Khanate attacked Circassia. A large Crimean army led by Devlet-Girey and Kalga Shabaz-Girey attacked Kabarda and the Battle of Beshtamak took place. The Crimean horde entered Mozdok and devastated nearby villages. In 1779, he led the Kabardian army during the Seven Months' War.

A Kabardian folk song about Misost:

The hero's sword cuts down the foe.

Misost the Great, who chased enemies all his life,

Though his campaigns have ceased, his heart still rides with war.

He is a man of valor, not one to be led.

In 1785, after the death of the previous prince, Misost Bematuqo was elected as the supreme prince of Kabardia.

In April 1788, Misost Bematuqo surrendered to Russia.

His son, Temirbolet, was educated at the Land Cadet Corps and returned to Kabarda in 1803 with the rank of captain in the Russian army.
