= Russian–Kumyk Wars =

Russo-Kumyks Wars
- Part of Russian conquest of the Caucasus
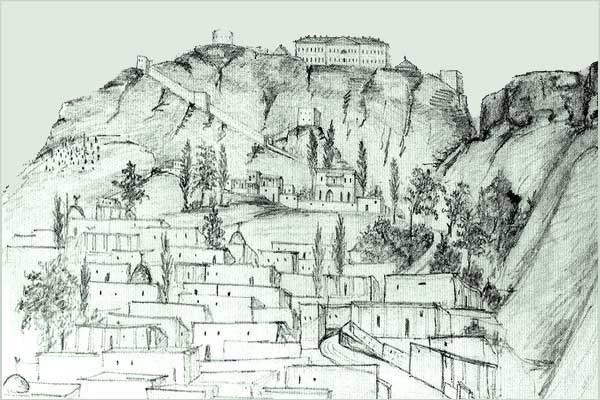
- Tarki. View from the Caspian Sea. Milutin's sketch
Date	16th–18th centuries
Location	North Caucasus, Kumykia, Dagestan
Territorial changes	In 1786, the Tarkov Shamkhalate became a vassal of Russia

Belligerents
Tsardom of Russia; Kabardia	Shamkhalate of Tarki; Endireev Principality other Kumyk and Dagestans feudal entities

Commanders and leaders
Ivan IV the Terrible; Temruqo the Brave; Boris Godunov; Alexis of Russia; Peter I Aleksey Yermolov; Nikita Pankratiev other Russian commanders	Chopan ibn Buday; Buday I Sultan-Mahmud Endireevsky other Kumyk rulers

The Russian–Kumyk wars (Kumyk: Orus-Qumuq Dawlar) were a series of military conflicts between the Russian Tsardom (and later the Russian Empire) and the Kumyk Tarki Shamkhalate and other Kumyk states and feudal possessions (the Principality of Endirey, the Utamysh Sultanate, the Mehtuli Khanate, Kaitag Utsmiate and other Dagestani and North Caucasian entities) during the 16th–18th centuries. At the end of the 18th century, as well as during and after the Caucasian War, and throughout the end of the 19th and the beginning of the 20th centuries, conflicts continued in the form of uprisings in Shamkhalate, Northern Kumykia, Southern Kumykia, and in the form of anti-colonial protests of individual villages (societies). In the result of these wars and uprisings, some Kumyk areas and villages were destroyed several times over.

== Background ==
The fall of the Golden Horde in 1502 opened up prospects for the Kumyk Shamkhal rulers to expand their borders to the north. Soon, the rulers of the Tyumen Khanate (Shamkhalian, or Caucasian Tyumen), a state entity with its center at the mouth of the Terek river, were under the influence of the Shamkhals. In the west, the interests of the Shamkhalate clashed with Adyghs (their Kabardian branch), in the north – with the Astrakhan Khanate.

The rulers of Tyumen Khanate in the first half of the 16th century, backed by "Circassians" (Kumyk, other Turkic and Kabardian feudal lords allied with them), repeatedly interfered in the civil strife in the Astrakhan Khanate, and in 1532 even appointed the Tyumen ruler Ak-Kubek, the son of Murtaza and grandson of Ahmat, to its throne. In 1556 the Astrakhan Khanate was conquered by the Russian tsardom. This event, along with the marriage of Ivan the Terrible to the Kabardian princess Maria daughter of Temruk, lead to Russia's involvement in the politics of the Caucasus.

== The early campaigns of Russia ==
In 1557, the Kabardian embassy appealed to the Russian administration in Astrakhan with a request for military action against Shamkhalate of Tarki. Similar request was repeated by the embassy of 1558, from the sons of Temryuk Idarov, one of the princes of Kabarda. According to the kavkazologist E. Kusheva, the reason behind the petitions of Kabardians could have been the enmity of Temryuk Idarov towards the Shamkhal. Ivan IV soon sent an army against the Shamkhalate and Caucasian Tyumen.

In the summer of 1560, the troops of the voivode I.S. Cheremisinov moved out of Astrakhan by sea with the goal of capturing the capital of Tarki Shamkhalate — Tarki. Russian troops managed to take the city, but did not try to hold it, being satisfied with just burning it.

The Shamkhal did not stop involving in the affairs of the Kabardian princes. The general battle between allied Temryuk Idarovich's and the tsar's army, from one sine, and the Shamkhal Buday and his also Kabardian ally Pshimkhao Kaitukin, from the other, took place in 1566, ending in the death of Shamkhal Buday, his brother Surkhai and their Kabardian ally. The battle was of great importance, as the western possessions fell away from Shamkhalate, while it is mentioned that in the 16th century Shamkhals collected "yasaq" (tributes) from the areas stretching to Balkaria and Karachay.

The Idarovs then directed the tsarist campaigns to the Tyumen Khanate, whose ruler Soltaney, in alliance with the Shamkhal, desperately resisted the united Russian-Kabardian invasion. However, in 1588 Streltsy founded the fortress of Terki in the very center of Tyumen Khanate on the river Terek.

Two years later, an attack was made on the lands of the Shamkhals, but the attack was repulsed by the Kumyks. The lands of the Tyumen Khanate were finally conquered and annexed by the Russian Tsardom in 1594.

== Khvorostinin's Dagestan campaign of 1594 ==
After reaching agreements with the Georgian tsar Alexander II, as well as with the Kumyk Qrym-Shamkhal (Vice-Shamkhal, a relative of Shamkhal, who traditionally was considered as an heir to the throne), the Russian army of 5,000 people, under the command of voivode Khvorostinin, departed the Koisinsky fortress and began its advance towards Tarki. Shamkhal preferred not to engage in open battles against the Russians. Tarki, with its fortifications being not strong enough, was quickly occupied.

Shamkhal did not negotiate and avoided direct clashes with the Russians, exhausting the latter with small raids and keeping Tarki in a wide blockade. The mountaineers did not give the Russians any rest day or night. According to V. Potto:

"Shamkhal was a supporter of the wait-and-see method of warfare and followed the Dagestani rule – To catch the scorpion by the tail."

The Russians' rear communications were targeted. Not a single supply dispatch could reach Tarki or travel out of it safely. Meanwhile, due to hot weather and the lack of food, a fever began to develop within the Russian army. The number of sick and wounded in the clashes with Kumyks grew every day. At the same time, the Shamkhal's army was continuously replenished with the arrival of new reinforcements. The blockade ring was gradually closing in.

The situation of the besieged became catastrophic, and Khvorostinin decided to withdraw from Tarki. On a dark night, Russian troops set out to move back towards the Koisinsky fortress. At first, retreating troops managed to withstand scattered attacks of the Dagestanis, but the arrival of the main forces led by Shamkhal himself forced the Russians to abandon their heavy loads and wounded.

In the end, only a quarter of the total number of the Russian troops, that had previously marched from the Koisinsky fortress, returned back. The total losses of the Russian army in that campaign amounted to 3,000 people. According to some local tales, out of 1,000 Terek (Grebensky) Cossacks who marched, no more than 300 people returned home. The campaign ended with no success.

== Buturlin's campaign of 1604–1605 ==
- Schevkal campaign

In the beginning of the 17th century, the North Caucasus plunged into internecine wars. Local feudal lords often sought help from neighboring powers. The Kabardian vassals of Moscow, as well as the Okotsk murzas, supported Moscow's expansion. Russia's intervention was also facilitated by a new request from the Georgians seeking support against the Ottoman Empire and its close regional ally Shamkhalate, which regularly carried out attacks on Iberia.

Trying to take advantage of the favorable political situation (another war between the Ottoman Empire and the Safavids began), the tsar's government decided to organize a new expedition to Dagestan. The army consisted of 10,000 Streltsy, the Yaitsk and Terek Cossacks, local vassals of Moscow (some pro-Russian Kabardian feudal lords and Okotsk murzas). The army amounted to a significant force in the region. According to a Dutch merchant Isaac Massa, a total of 50,000 people was led by voivode Ivan Mikhailovich Buturlin (this headcount estimation isn't supported by any other source and is most likely an exaggeration). In 1604, the tsarist troops set out on a campaign.

Kumyks, as in 1594, did not engage in major clashes with the Russians, and conducted guerrilla warfare. Russian troops occupied the entire Kumyk planes and stormed Tarki. Shamkhal Surkhai II retreated to the Avar Khan's strongholds, granting the authority over his army to his enterprising nephew Sultan-Mut. Soon Buturlin encountered shortage of supplies and was forced to send part of his army to Astrakhan and Terki fortress. The retreating troops were attacked by Sultan Mut, but managed to repel the attackers causing significant losses.

However, in the longer term the prince Sultan-Mut managed to create a coalition of Kumyks, other Dagestan peoples and some anti-Russian Kabardian feudal lords – relatives of Sultan-Mut on the maternal side. Assistance was also provided by the Ottoman Sultan Ahmed I, who sent 1,000 janissaries and Crimean Tatars. The allied army attacked fortresses built by the Russians. Koisinsky fortress, the Russian fortress on Aktash and some other fortresses fell. Buturlin found himself completely cut off.

Soon Sultan-Mut's troops besieged Tarki. They filled up the ditches and erected a mound of sand and brushwood at the level of the fortress wall. The most important Russian footholds were two upper towers, which had wide firing range. A huge powder charge was laid under one of the tower. After the explosion the "best squads" of Moscow Streltsy were killed, and the janissaries and Dagestani forces stormed the stronghold. Part of the fortress wall was destroyed, and large storming forces poured into the gap. However, the Russians managed to repel all the attacks, with huge damage to the attackers. The besieged also suffered heavy losses.

Seeing the futility of further struggle, the parties began negotiations. They resulted in an agreement on safe departure of the Russian army to the Terki. However, the people of Kumykia and Dagestan, after recognizing the devastation of their lands and many killed countrymen, pushed Sultan-Mut to take decisive action against the retreating Russians.

Soon Buturlin's army was encircled by Kumyk and their allies, and completely destroyed in the Battle of Karaman, in which Ivan Buturlin himself fell. According to the Russian chronicles, the losses of Russians amounted to about 7 thousand people, "in addition to the boyar people". N. Karamzin and few other sources wrote about 6,000–7,000 losses of the Russians.

The Battle of Karaman, according to Karamzin, kept the territory of the Northern Caucasus out of the active expansion plans of tsarist Russia for another 118 years.

== The Battle of Hermenchik and the Russian-Persian Conflict of 1651–1653 ==
Shamkhals and other Kumyk rulers continued to maneuver between the major powers surrounding them, often changing their foreign policy orientation depending on the prevailing balance of power. One of the important issues for the local nobles was one of strengthening their military strength. To this end, close ties were established with the Nogais, who were often assisted by Kumyks against the Kalmyks. A proposal to "nomadize closer to the mountains" was given by Sultan Mut to Nogais. Finally, in the late 1640s, Shamkhal Surkhai III invited to his lands a small Nogai horde led by Choban-murza Ishterek, which opposed tsar's rule over Nogai steppes. Shamkhal, explaining his help to Nogais, wrote to the Astrakhan voivodes that "..we, Kumyks, have and cherish our "kunaks" (friends and guests) from the old times of our fathers".

Aiming to make Nogais return under the Russian control, tsar's troops, along with their vassals Kabardians and Cossacks, were sent to Kumykia, again towards Tarki. Also, this time Endirey ruler Kazanalp son of Sultan-Mut sided with Russian. There are accounts mentioning that some Swedish mercenaries, left without job after the end of the Thirty Years' War, took part in this battle on the side of Russians. In 1649 or 1650 (according to different sources), the Battle on the Hermenchik field happened, won by the allied Kumyk-Nogai army. Russians were defeated. Endirey ruler returned under the influence of Shamkhal.

In the middle of the 17th century strengthened Iran, represented by Shah Abbas II, sought to expand its northern borders. According to the Qasr-e Shirin Peace Treaty of 1639, which ended the Turkish-Persian War of 1623–1639, the spheres of influence in the Caucasus were divided between the Ottoman Empire and Safavid Iran, and territories from Derbent to Sunzha river fell under Safavids. In this regard, Shah Abbas II decided to campaign against the Russian fortresses on the Terek and Sunzha, relying on the forces of the Kumyk vassals (contemporaries often describe this relationship in the opposite way, like Safavids paid tribute to Kumyk rulers for their support) — the Endirey princes and Tarki Shamkhals. Interests of Kumyks and Safavids coincided only in terms of countering Russians, but Kumyks did not want Iranians in Dagestan. The formal motive for the outbreak of hostilities between Russia and Safavids was the restoration of the Sunzha fortress, because Russian fortresses on the Terek and Sunzha disrupted Shah's plans.

In 1651, Khosrow Khan of Shamakhi received a Shah's decree – to lead the campaign of the Persian army to Sunzha and Terek. The objectives of the campaign were broader than just gaining stronghold on Sunzha river. As Khosrow Khan put it, he received an order from Shah Abbas to cease Sunzha fortress, destroy it, and then "go to Astrakhan without delay". Khosrow Khan entrusted the task of capturing the Sunzha fortress to Shamkhal Surkhai. The army consisted of the forces of Surkhai, ruler of the Endirey biylik Kazan-Alp, and ruler of Kaitag Amir-khan Sultan. To reinforce Shamkhal's army, Khan of Shamakhi sent regular Persian troops. Some 800 Iranian "sarbaz" (soldiers) took part in the campaign: "500 people from Shamakhi, and 300 people from Derbeni (Derbent), and with them two guns." Nogai Choban-Murza's and Shahtemir-Murza's uluses also joined the Kumyks and Persians. The militia of the highlanders was joined by a couple of Chechen societies living along the Michik and Argun rivers, where they were allowed to settle by the Shamkhal for the obligation to help Shamkhal in his military endeavors. The total number of the allied army reached 12,000 people. Kumyks and Iranians met resistance of the vassal of the Russian Kingdom, Mutsal Cherkassky, and Bragunians. The siege of the Sunzha prison ended without any major success.

During 1652, the Shah was preparing a second campaign. Shamkhal Surkhai and Kazan-Alp with their troops were standing on Aktash, preparing to march on Sunzha. The Russian government was fortifying the Sunza fortress. On the eve of the second campaign, the squadrons of Kabardian Murza Urus Khan Yansokhov's and of his son Shangirey were ordered by Prince Mutsal Cherkassky to reinforce fortress' Russian garrison. This time Mutsal himself remained outside the walls of the fortress and during the siege attacked the Persian troops by multiple raids.

On 7 March 1653, troops under the command of Surkhai-Shamkhal of Tarki besieged the Sunzha fortress for the second time. The reinforcements sent from the Terki town were defeated and situation deteriorated fast. The remnants of the garrison (108 people) were forced to leave the prison and retreat to Terki. The fortress itself was burned by Surkhai, who then returned to Tarki. Shah was preparing a new expedition, the purpose of which was Astrakhan, but the attack on Iran by the Afghans made its implementation impossible. The conflict was soon settled. The campaign led to a certain weakening of Russia's influence in the region.

== 18th century ==
=== The Persian Campaign of Peter I of 1722–1723 ===
At the beginning of the 18th century Dagestan was still a subject of interest of three empires: the Russian Empire, Iran and the Ottoman Empire. Kumyk feudal possessions adhered to different political vectors. For example, Utamysh Sultanate followed pro-Crimean (pro-Ottoman) orientation, the Shamkhals of Tarki, while losing control of many feudal domains, at some point accepted personal conditional sovereignty of the Russian Empire.

Willing to take advantage of the weakness and turmoil in Iran, the Russian Emperor Peter I set out on a campaign to seize the coast of the Caspian Sea. The formal reason for the outbreak of hostilities was the murder of Russian merchants in Shamakhi by the Dagestani Imam Hadji-Dawud, who refused to accept allegiance to Russia. On 18 July 1722 a Russian flotilla of 274 ships sailed under the command of Admiral General Count Feodor Apraksin. On 20 July the fleet entered the Caspian Sea and followed the western coast for a week.

On 23 July, Peter I sent corps under the command of Andrei Veterani to the hostile mountainous area Andy. He was joined by the prince of the Kabarda Elmurza Cherkassky, as well as by Mutsal Cherkassky. On the outskirts of Endirey, the Russians were attacked by the Endirey princes Aidemir Bardykhanov and Chapan-shawkhal, and their subject Chechen troops in what resulted in the Battle of Endirey. The attackers inflicted serious damage to the Veterani corps, rumors of defeat began to spread in the Peter's main army. Andy was soon taken and burned, but Andrei Veterani was still punished for the failure and losses. At first, Peter, upon receiving news of the victory, wrote sarcastically to Astrakhan about how his dragoons "captured provisions, and turned the village into fireworks for the fun of its owners". However, after the news of the losses, joy was replaced by annoyance. The tsar understood how important it was to start any campaign successfully. Prior to the start of the Persian Campaign, he ordered Veterani to be careful and act "without mischief, so that in the beginning of this matter we would not be disgraced."

On 27 July, Russian infantry landed at the Agrakhan Cape, 4 Versts below the mouth of the Koysu (Sulak) River. A few days later, the cavalry arrived. On 5 August the Russian army continued to advance moving towards Derbent. On 6 August Kabardian princes Murza Cherkassky and Aslan-Bek joined the army on Sulak with their troops. On 8 August, army crossed Sulak. On 15 August, the troops approached Tarki, the seat of Shamkhal.

An embassy was sent to Sultan-Mahmud of Utamysh (ruler of the Utamysh Sultanate), with an offer to pledge allegiance to Russia. Sultan-Mahmud not only refused, but also killed Cossack envoys, telling Peter I that this would happen to everyone from Peter's army who would fall into his hands. Later their forces clashed in the Battle on the Inche River, in which the Russians defeated the troops of Sultan Mahmud and his ally Ahmed-Khan of Kaitag. The capital of the Utamysh Sultanate was burned down along with its other settlements. Sultan-Mahmud's possessions were transferred to the Tarki Shamkhal, who this time didn't cause any trouble to Russians.

Peter I and other participants of the campaign noted the incredible bravery of the Kumyks of the Utamysh Sultanate. Peter I wrote: "It was amazing how the barbarians fought.."

In the diary of the participant of the campaign, Henry Bruce, he cites Peter I about the soldiers of Sultan Mahmud:

"Another prisoner, when he was brought to the tent (of Admiral Apraksin), did not want to answer any of the questions that were addressed to him, then they gave the order to strip him and beat him with whips. Having received the first blow, he snatched the sword from the officer standing next to him, ran to the admiral's tent and probably would have killed him if two sentries standing at the tent had not plunged their bayonets into his stomach. Falling, he tore a piece of meat from the hand of one of the sentries with his teeth, after which he was killed. When the emperor entered the tent, Admiral Apraksin said that he hadn't come to this country to be devoured by rabid dogs, and that he had never been so scared in his whole life. The Emperor, smiling, replied: "If this people had a concept of the art of war, then no nation could have taken up arms with them.""

Having made sure that the goal of Peter I was Derbent, the ally of the Sultan of Utamysh Utsmi Ahmed-Khan of Kaitag submitted a petition to become a Russian subject. But this did not mean that Dagestani rulers settled down. On 20 September 1722 the commandant of Derbent, Andrei Junger, reported that the soldiers of Hadji Dawud, Utsmiy, Kazikumukh Khan Surkhay and Utemysh Sultan-Mahmud captured Russian redoubt on the Orta-Bugan river (sixty versts from Derbent), "and the people on guard by the enemy are defeated." According to the Derbent naib, the three-day assault cost the attackers 400 dead, and only three people from the garrison of 128 soldiers and six Cossacks escaped hiding in the reeds. On 19 and 21 September, the highlanders stormed a retrenchment near the Rubasa river; the attack was held off, but one of the fortification walls collapsed, and the garrison had to be withdrawn. Major General Kropotov reported that the soldiers of Sultan Mahmud and Utsmiy attacked his rearguard near Buinak. The roads have become so dangerous that the commander of the Agrakhan fortification, Colonel Maslov, on 28 August received an order not to send anyone towards the army, since "it is impossible to pass the land among the mountain peoples". Couriers with papers from the Senate, the Board of Foreign Affairs and other institutions have been stuck in Agrakhan. Sultan-Mahmud, in alliance with Utsmiy, having gathered 20,000 troops, followed the retreating Russias, but did not engage.

After the death of the energetic Sultan Mahmud, the Utamysh Sultanate leaves the political arena as an independent possession.

=== Events in 1725 ===
In 1725 Shamkhal Adil-Girey of Tarki, dissatisfied with the construction of a Russian fortress in his possessions (which was a violation of the agreements leading him not to oppose Peter's campaign), decided to break with the Russian government. After calling other mountainous rulers of Dagestan to join the campaign, Adil-Girey gathered an army of 20,000 people. The Kaitag Utsmiy Ahmed-Khan promised to join the campaign, but never arrived. The siege of the Fortress of the Holy Cross ended in failure. Shamkhal's allies quarreled over their intents towards Russians and left the fight. But Russians, willing to punish the Shamkhal for the attempt, embarked on another expedition.

During the expedition, about 20 Kumyk villages were devastated. There were attempts of resistance (battles at Issisu, Kumtorkali, Upper Kazanysh), and Russian commanders noted that the enemy "acted fiercely" and the regular troops and buckshot cannons had to be used. Nevertheless, Tarki and Shamkhal's palace were destroyed. As noted by commander Eropkin, Russians destroyed another 6,000 courts (households) in the vicinity of Tarki.

Trying to keep his lands safe from yet another devastating invasion, Adil-Girey surrendered, was exiled to the Kola fortress of the Arkhangelsk Governorate, where his days ended. The Shamkhal title was abolished following the events. In 1735 it was reinstituted by Nadir Shah, who helped the son of Adil-Girey, Khasbulat, to the throne.

Some researchers mark the Shamkhalian expedition of 1725 as the start of the Caucasian War.

=== Russian campaign against Bashly in 1733 ===
In 1733, Russian troops, numbering 5,000 soldiers, stormed walled and cannon-fortified capital of Utsmiy, the "village of Barashly" (Bashly). The most significant villages in the Utsmiy's lands were burned and destroyed. The losses of Russian troops during the assault amounted to 400 people. Only 1 person was taken prisoner from the Bashlynians, because, as Russian participants noted, the locals had a "barbaric" custom of not surrendering alive.

=== 1770s ===
In 1773, Ali-Sultan of Dzhengutay, the ruler of Kumyk Mekhtulu Khanate, in support of the Kabardian princes who opposed Russia, made a successful campaign to Kizlyar, defeating Russian troops.

In 1775, Medem's campaign to Dagestan took place, again against the Utsmiy, who besieged Derbent, the center of the pro-Russian Derbent Khanate at the time. At first, the troops of Utsmiy were defeated in the area of Iran-Kharab, near Bashly. And then General Medem seized and devastated the main settlement of Bashly.

== Mansur's Movement, 1785 ==
Kumyks played a crucial role in the movement of the highlanders under the leadership of Sheikh Mansur, who raised the banner of uprising in 1785. Sheikh Mansur was supported by a number of influential princes and by the population of the Northern Kumykia (Kumyk plains and Terek-Sulak interfluve). Russian documents show that colonial authorities were afraid that support provided by Kumyks could lead to serious consequences.

Kumyk princes participated in the first attack on the Russian garrison in Kizlyar, organized by Sheikh Mansur. Those were Chapalav Anji-Murtazali, Makhach Uruskhan, Hamza Alish, along with their uzdens. The Kumyks made a decision that:

"...if there are traitors among them and they will inform the Russian authorities about the course of the uprising, then such a person will be killed and his house will be destroyed".

Sheikh Mansur found support mostly in Chechen and Kumyk villages. The Russian authorities have issued a demand full of threats – to surrender Sheikh Mansur:

"...If the Kumyk and Chechen peoples, by turning to the true path, bring repentance, catching a scoundrel, giving him away, then they will be forgiven in everything, left in peace, and three thousand rubles will be given to those who bring him alive, and the head from the dead — will cost five hundred rubles. But if the masses do not repent or... they will continue aiding him, then I will move the thunder of weapons and a sharp sword to defeat criminals."

After defeating tsarist troops in Aldy in 1785, Mansur, strengthened by the support of more Dagestanis, decided to take Kizlyar. Describing the composition of the Ushurma army near Kizlyar, Dubrovin writes:

"There were Chechens, Kabardins, Lezgins (mountaineers of Dagestan) of various tribes and generations, people of the Tarki Shamkhalate and, most importantly, Kumyks, who constituted the core of the crowd".

According to Bennigsen, the Kumyks constituted about a third of the Mansur's entire army, and his personal guard.

== See also ==
- Russian conquest of the Caucasus
- Kumykia
