= Battle of Terki (1721) =

1721 conflict at Terki Fortress

- Part of Chechen–Russian conflict
Date	February 1721
Location	Terki Fortress, Terek River, Russian Empire (Modern–day Kizlyar District, Dagestan, Russia)
Result	Russian victory

Belligerents
Endirey Khanate	Russian Empire

Commanders and leaders
Aidemir Bardykhanov; Musal Chopalov	(Russian Empire) Colonel V. I. Zaozersky

Strength
4,600: 1,200 Infantry; 3,400 Cavalry	Unknown

Casualties and losses
Heavy	32: 11 KIA; 21 WIA

The 1721 Battle of Terki was a battle between Chechen-Kumyk forces led by the princes Aidemir Bardykhanov and Musal Chopalov against the Russian fortress Terki. The attack was repelled and the attackers were forced to retreat.

== History ==
Previously, in 1718, Cossack raiders sacked several Chechen villages, as a response to which the princes Aidemir Bardykhanov and Musal Chopalov invaded Cossack villages and attacked Russian Terek fortifications. Combined with the attack on Terki 3 years later in 1721, these incidents were the main reasons for the two major Russian campaigns against the Chechens and Kumyks.

In February 1721, the two princes of Endirey, Aidemir Bardykhanov and Musal Chopalov, with an army numbering 4,600 fighters, made up of 1,200 infantry and 3,400 cavalry, launched an attack on the Terki fortress. However the garrison along with Greben Cossack fighters repelled the North Caucasians, only suffering 11 killed and 21 wounded. With heavy losses, the two princes retreated, ending the battle of Terki in a victory for the Russian Empire.

== See also ==
- Aidemir Bardykhanov — One of the leaders of the attack
- Insurgency in Chechnya (1722) — Series of Russian punitive campaigns against the Chechens and Kumyks
