= Battle of Endirey =

1722 military conflict on the Aktash river

- Part of the Insurgency in Chechnya and the Russo-Persian War (1722-1723)
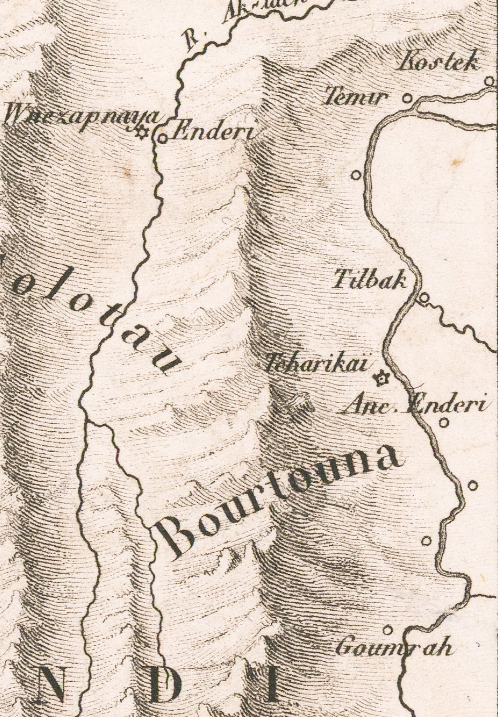
- Old Endirey (map of 1823)
Date	23 July 1722
Location	Aktash River near Endirey, Endirey Khanate
Result	Kumyk–Chechen victory: Destruction of Endirey; Eventual defeat and retreat of the Veterani corps

Belligerents
Principality of Endirey; Endirey Chechens; Chechens	Russian Empire; Don Cossacks; Kalmyk Khanate; Kabardia (Eastern Circassia)

Commanders and leaders
Chopan Endireevsk; Aydemir Endireevsk; Gebek Sheikh; Aidemir Bardykhanov	(Russian Empire) Andrei Veterani (Russian Empire) Colonel Naumov (Russian Empire) Elmurza Cherkassky (Russian Empire) Mutsal Cherkassky; Ayuka Khan

Units involved
Kumyks and Chechens from Endirey; Militias from Chechnya	3 Dragoon Regiments; Don Cossacks

Strength
5,000–6,000; Unknown	2,400–6,400: (Russian Empire) 2,000–6,000; 400

Casualties and losses
300 casualties: Many captured	204 casualties: 89 killed; 115 wounded

The Battle of Endirey was a major confrontation between the Russian Empire and its allies with the Chechens and Kumyks and took place in a gorge on the Aktash River near Endirey. An army sent led by Brigadier Andrei Veterani was encircled by a combined Chechen–Kumyk force, as a result of which the corps was defeated and forced to retreat. Another detachment under Colonel Naumov broke into Endirey and destroyed it.

== History ==
In 1718, a large mountaineer force led by Aidemir Bardykhanov attacked Russian Terek fortifications and Cossack villages in retaliation for recent Cossack raids on Chechen villages. In February 1721, he conducted a major attack on the Terki fortress but was repelled with heavy losses. Together with a series of other Chechen and Kumyk raids on Russian territory, this led to the 2 punitive campaigns against the mountaineers in 1722. The people of Endirey began preparing for a potential Russian campaign by fortifying the town and setting up defences, including defensive ditches, while non–combatants were evacuated to the mountains. Chechen fighters also came to help the Endireyans.

In July 1722, an army under the command of Brigadier Andrei Veterani was sent to punish the rebels and occupy the town Endirey, the capital of the Endirey Khanate. (Note: Often known as the Andreevskaya town in Russian sources) On his way, he was joined by the princes of Greater Kabardia—Elmurza Cherkassky and Mutsal Cherkassky, who were lieutenants in the Russian army. Some sources say the army counted 2,400 men, while other sources say it was 6,400 strong.

In a gorge on the Aktash River near Endirey, the army was encircled by a combined Chechen–Kumyk force, between 5,000 and 6,000, led by the two princes. The rebels, armed with sabers, daggers, arrows and guns, ran out from the forest, attacked the Russian detachment and quickly retreated back into the forest. Taken by surprise, the panicking Russian army could not offer any serious resistance and was forced to retreat, with 89 soldiers killed and 115 wounded. The Chechens and Kumyks also suffered considerable losses, with many being captured.

Reinforcements under Colonel Naumov soon arrived and left a part of his troops to hold their position and distract the rebels, while he and the main army directly attacked Endirey. Under fierce rebel resistance, the army of Naumov broke through the Endireyan defences and destroyed the entire town, leaving "nothing but ashes" behind.

As a result of the failure of the campaign, Peter the Great sent a 15,000 strong army to Chechnya and the Endirey Khanate, which devastated destroyed several villages. As a result, the Khanate went into decline.

== See also ==
- Insurgency in Chechnya (1722) — Main conflict
- Aidemir Bardykhanov — One of the main commanders of the rebel forces
