= Insurgency in Chechnya (1722) =

- Part of Chechen–Russian conflict
Date	July–August 1722
Location	Chechnya and the Endirey Khanate
Result	Russian victory

Belligerents
Chechens; Endirey Khanate	Russian Empire; Kalmyk Khanate

Commanders and leaders
Aidemir Bardykhanov; Musal Chapalov	First Campaign: Andrey Veterani; Colonel Naumov Second Campaign: Lieutenant Kudryavtsev; Ayuka Khan

Strength
First Campaign: 5,000–6,000 Second Campaign: Unknown	First Campaign: 2,400 Second Campaign: 13,730–15,000: (Russian Empire) 10,000; 3,730–5,000 Kalmyks

The 1722 Insurgency in Chechnya occurred because of the refusal of the Chechens and the Endirey Khanate to swear allegiance to the Russian Empire, due to the oppression of the highlanders by the Tsarist regime, followed by several raids on the Terek fortress by the former, which led to a Russian campaign against the North Caucasians in July and August 1722.

== History ==
=== First Campaign ===
Because of the oppression, the North Caucasians formed militias and raided the Terek fortress. Expecting a Russian punitive campaign, the people of Endirey began defensive measures such as ditches.

==== Battle of Endirey ====
In July 1722, a Russian cavalry corps, 2,400 strong, led by brigadier Veterani, approached Endirey. While marching along the Aktash River in a mountain gorge near the city, the Russian army got ambushed by a Chechen–Kumyk force between 5,000 and 6,000 strong, who entirely encircled the enemy army and killed 80 soldiers. Meanwhile, another detachment led by Colonel Naumov invaded Endirey and destroyed it.

=== Second Campaign ===
By order of Peter I, on August 4 of the same year, a new campaign against the Chechens and Kumyks was conducted. The new army consisted of Russian troops under the command of Lieutenant Kudryavtsev and a 3,700 strong army led by Ayuka Khan of the Kalmyk Khanate.
According to Russian sources:

In the same August, the Kalmyks really did devastation to the Endyreans, and, extending it, as usual, beyond the limits, they recaptured rams, bulls and horses not only from the Endyrean owner Chopal Chopalov, but also from the Aksai Sultan Magmut, people loyal to Russia.

The second campaign led to the defeat of the rebels, who were forced to recognize their Russian citizenship. The Kumyks were allowed to return to Endirey, but were not allowed to build any fortifications near it. Ayuka Khan, who showed diligence in suppressing the uprising, in addition to the 10 thousand rubles granted to him when organizing the campaign, at the end of the raid received the same amount as a reward for his labors. After these events, the Kalmyks were often used to protect Russian settlements and fortifications in the region and punitive raids deep into Chechnya and Dagestan.

== See also ==
- Murat Kuchukov Movement — Previous major Chechen uprising against the Russian Empire
- Battle of Endirey — First conflict in the war; Defeat of the Russian troops

== Sources ==
- Ибрагимов, М. М. (2008). История Чечни с древнейших времён до наших дней (in Russian). Grozny: ГУП «Книжное издательство». pp. 1–827.
- Jaimoukha, Amjad (2005). The Chechens: A handbook (PDF). Psychology Press. pp. 1–320.
