= Shadrin =

Shadrin (masculine, Russian: Шадрин) or Shadrina (feminine, Russian: Шадрина) is a Russian surname. Notable people with the surname include:

- Aleksandr Shadrin (1988–2014), Uzbekistani soccer player
- Andrei Shadrin, Cossack leader in 16th century
- Elena Shadrina (born 1982), Russian weightlifter
- Nicholas Shadrin (1922–1975), Soviet naval officer and defector
- Pavel Shadrin (born 1993), Russian soccer player
- Tatiana Shadrina (born 1974), Russian chess player
- Vladimir Shadrin (1948–2021), Soviet ice hockey player
