= Front of Shamyl =

Militant organization in Dagestan, Russia

The Imam Shamil Front is a militant organization in Dagestan led by Gadzhi Makhachev which supports the cause of the Avar ethnic group, competing with the interest of Kumyk movements. The larger Avar movement had split into the Shamyl front and the Union of Avar Jamaat.
