= Kumykia =

Historical and geographical region in southern Russia

Kumykia (Kumyk: Qumuq, Къумукъ), or rarely called Kumykistan, is a historical and geographical region located along the Caspian Sea shores, on the Kumyk plateau, in the foothills of Dagestan and along the river Terek. The term Kumykia encompasses territories which are historically and currently populated by the Turkic-speaking Kumyk people. Kumykia was the main "granary of Dagestan". The important trade routes, such as one of the branches of the Great Silk Road, passed via Kumykia.

== Regions of Kumykia ==
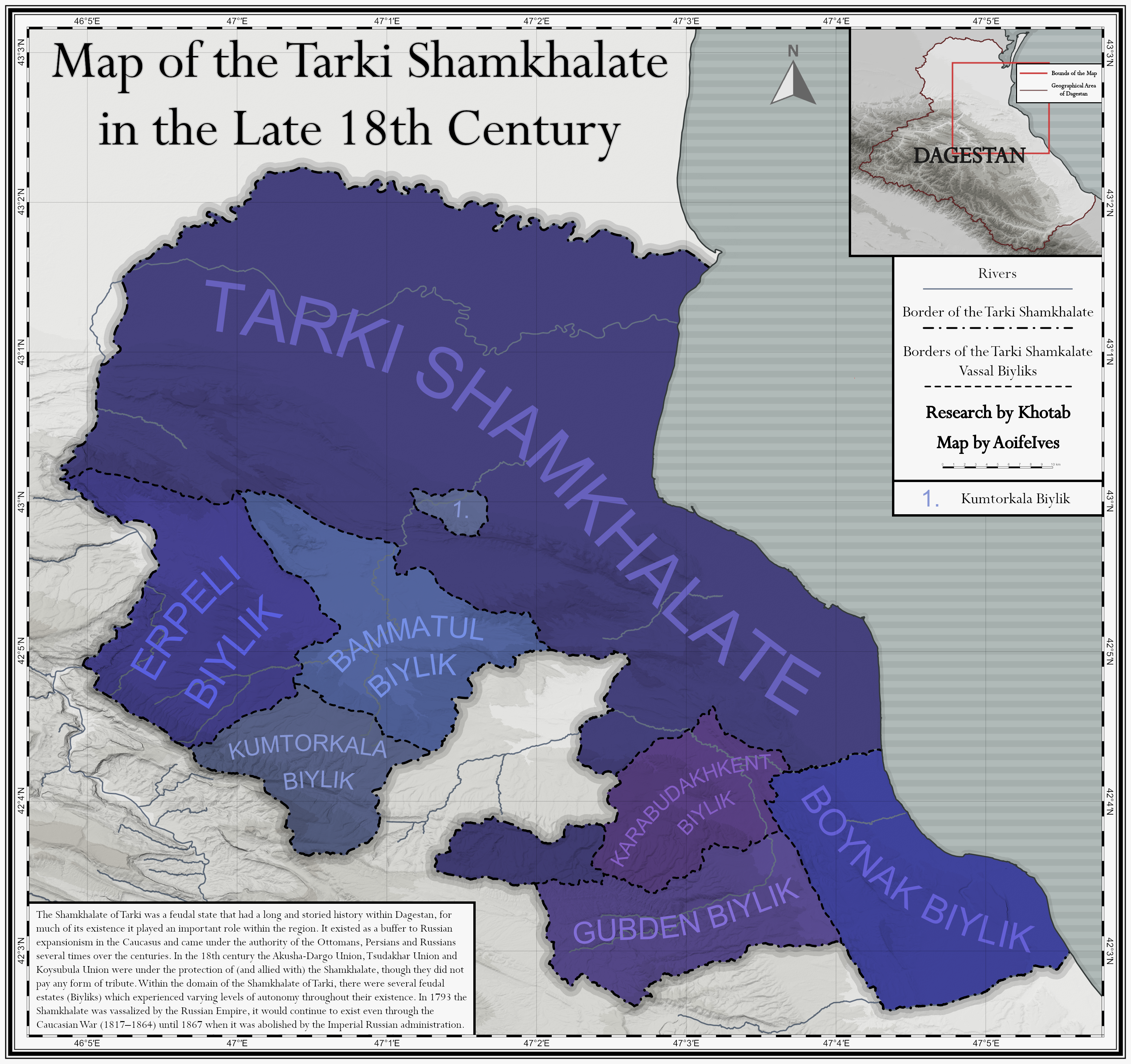
Map of the Shamkhalate of Tarki in the late 18th century.

Shamkhalate, or Shawkhalate, or since the 16th century the Shamkhalate of Tarki (Kumyk: Tarğu Şawhallıq) was a state that presumably formed around the 8th century and existed until the 19th century, in different forms, even though it disintegrated in the 16th century into several feudal entities. The ruler of Shamkhalate was considered the ruler of all of Dagestan and held the title of Vali of Dagestan. In the end of the 16th century Shamkhalate de facto was a part of the Ottoman Empire. Shamkhalat had vassal regions and political entities stretching to Balkaria, and was acknowledged throughout the Northern Caucasus. Since the 16th century the state had a major importance in Russian Tsardom's and then Empire's politics at its Southern borders, as it was the main obstacle in conquering the Caucasus and competing with Persians and Ottomans for regional dominance.

=== Shamkhal possession ===
The possession of Shamkhal (Kumyk: Şawhal ulu, possession of the Shamkhal's dynasty). The region which remained in direct subordination of the shamkhal even after disintegration of the 16th century, it was abolished in 1867. The Kumyks, who inhabited this area, had the name "Shamkhalian". During the Caucasian War, several anti-Russian uprisings broke out in Shamkhalate. Shamkhal possession included several smaller semi-independent political entities:

- Mekhtulu (or Dzhengutay) possession (Kumyk: Mahti ulu biylik, Cüngütey biylik, meaning "the possession of the Mahdi's dynasty") was formed as a result of secession from the Tarkovsky Shamkhalate in the 16th century. It is known for the defeat of the army of the Afsharid Persian conqueror Nadir Shah in 1741, by the troops of the Ahmad-khan of Mekhtulu, in the Aymaki gorge near the Dzhengutay settlement.
- Bammatulu (Kumyk: Bammat ulu biylik, "the possession of the Bammat dynasty"), Erpeli and Karabudakhkent possessions were also formed as a result of secession from Tarki Shamkhalate in the 16th century.
- Boynak (or Buinak) possession (Kumyk: Boynaq biylik) is a small biylik (beylik, meaning principality) and residing place of Yarym-Shamkhal (or Kyrym-Shamkhal, Kumyk: Yarım-Şawhal, Qırım-Şawhal, meaning "Half/Side-Shamkhal"), with the center in the town of Boynak. This title was held by the heir of Shamkhalate throne (similar to the title of the Prince of Wales in the Great Britain).

=== Northern Kumykia ===
Northern, or Zasulak (beyond-Sulak) Kumykia is located in the Terek-Sulak interfluve, covering Kumyk Plain and some of the adjacent territories. It gained a significant role, independently of Shamkalate, with the rise of Sultan Mahmud of Endirey, member of the Shamkhal's house, who created Endirey principality (Kumyk: Endirey biylik), and who united numerous local peoples around the Kumyks in the fight against Russian expansion, which after the Battle of Karaman stopped, according to Karamzin, Russia's expansion in the Caucasus for more than a hundred years.

Apart from Endirey, other formations in the Zasulak Kumykia were the Aksay (Kumyk: Yaxsay biylik) and Kostek (Kumyk: Köstek biylik) principalities. The possessions of the Zasulak Shamklalian princes included such areas as Kachkalyk, Aukh and Salatavia. Kumyk princes settled some neighboring peoples, such as Chechens, in Zasulak Kumykia for the acceptance of certain obligations, including converting to Islam.

For the most part of it, in the 19th century the territories of Zasulak Kumykia became part of Kumyk District of the Terek region, which, after the end of the Caucasian War transformed into the Khasavyurt District.

=== Southern Kumykia ===
Southern Kumykia designates territories of the Kumyk-populated lands south of the historical Shamkhal possession.

- The Utamysh Sultanate, or the Gamri possession (Kumyk: Ötemiş biylik, Hamri biylik), also seceded from Shawkhalat at the end of the 16th century. The principality is known for its strong resistance, led by Sultan Mahmud of Utamysh, against Peter I during his Persian campaign in 1722. After the defeat by Peter I, the entity became a part of the possessions of the Kaitag Utsmiate. Sultan-Mahmud of Utamysh also participated in the wars of the Kumyks and Dagestanis against Nadir Shah, having won a number of victories against the Persian troops.
- Lower Kaitag is a union of societies under the rule of Utsmi of Kaitag in the lower part of Kaitag Utsmiate. The main Kumyk settlements in the area were Bashly and Majalis, both serving as a capital of the Usmiate in different periods.

=== Terek Kumykia ===
The Terek-Sunzha interfluve was also the domain of the Kumyk "biys". Areas populated by Terek Kumyks (that is Kumyks living along the river Terek) are historically associated with Tyumen possession (also called Shamkhalian Tyumen), Bragun principality, Golden Horde's Majar city and with Kuban steppes. Now these territories are included into other parts of Russian Federation – Chechnya, North Ossetia, Ingushetia.

== Early mentions of Kumykia ==
One of the first mentions of Kumykia can be encountered in Arab sources. Arabic author Al-Masudi in the 10th century mentions the "Possession of Gumik". According to the famous British orientalist Henry Yule, Gumik corresponds to the area of settlement of the Kumyks south of the river Terek.

According to Plano Carpini, "Komuk" and "Tark" peoples were conquered by the Mongols. During Tamerlane's conquests in the 14th century his court historians mentioned "all lands of the Kumuks". Researchers of the Timurid period list among the names of the areas populated by Kumyks at the time such regions as "Bugaz-Kum", "Kazi-Kumuk (Gazi-Kumukluk)", "Mamuktu", Kaitag.

In the 15–17th centuries diplomatic correspondence and documents of the Russian state used to mention Kumykia as "Kumyk land" (Russian: Кумыцкая земля).

== Sources about Kumykia ==
=== 8th century ===
According to the Encyclopædia Britannica, in the 8th century the Kumyks made up the vast majority in the Caspian region, and in addition, as indicated in the collection, the Mitshik river basin (today a part of Chechnya) was already called Kumykistan.

=== 16–17th centuries ===
The borders of the vassal possessions of the Kumyk rulers at one time extended to Balkaria. At the end of the 18th century, the feudal lords of the Chegem Gorge, in their appeal to the Russian command, mentioned that they once paid tribute to Budai-shamkhal of Tarki.

=== 18–19th centuries ===
As for the Shawkhalian (on the right bank of the river Sulak) and Southern Kumyks, as Dubrovin noted in 1871, in addition to the Kumyk Plateau, Kumyks inhabit the territories from Sulak to Derbent, all of the Tarki Shamkhalate and part of the Mekhtulu Khanate.

Ivan Blaramberg in 1832–1833 pointed to the borders of the Northern Kumykia:

The territory of the Kumyks is stretched between the rivers Terek, Aksay, Koysu [other name for Sulak] and the Caspian Sea, which constitutes its eastern border. To the north, it is separated from the Kizlyar region by swamps in the lower reaches of the Terek; in the west, it is located on both banks of the lower reaches of the Aksay to the fortress of Amir-Adzhi-Yurt, located on the right bank of the Terek; in the south it borders Dagestan and areas of Salatavians, Aukhians and Kachkalykians. The southern branch of the Sulak River, called "Kuru-Koysu" (Dry Koysu), separates the Kumyks from the territory of the Shamkhals of Tarki.

Also, Blaramberg recorded that at a certain time period the population of Kachkalyk (today's Chechnya, including Oysungur (he writes Ussungur) and Istisu, were Kumyks, who later mixed with the Chechens. This is confirmed by earlier records. Jacob Reineggs in the 1790s recorded that the inhabitants of Oysungur, making up 800 families, "speak Kumyk-Tatar" (i.e. Turkic or Kipchak Kumyk), and the language of the Isti-su society, "which means "warm water", is "Kumyk-Tatar", and the tribe originates from the Kumyks." Also, Reinegs mentions the "Tatar" (Kumyks were called Caucasian or Dagestan Tatars) society Boragun (Braguny).

In 1877–1878 Pavel Kovalevsky noted that the natural boundary of the Kumyk Plane and the possessions of the Kumyks was the Kachkalyk Range in the west (currently Chechnya).

Map of Northern Kumykia during the late 1700s.

According to the doctor of history Arsen Akbiev, part of the ancestors of the Zasulak Kumyks originally lived in Salatavia, as evidenced by the fact that until 1843 the Kumyk feudal lords (biys, or princes and sala-uzdens) were considered to be the owners of almost all of the Salatav land, and the mountain communities that settled there used to pay tribute to these feudal lords.

In 1732 the commandant of the fortress Kizlyar A. Akhverdov reports that Kumyks live "on the right bank of the Terek, at a distance from the river in the range of 20, 18, 15, 13 versts, brought there since ancient times by the Aksay owners, and settled in the present places under the name Alty Kachilyk." The resettlement of the Kachkalyks (one of the Chechen societies) by the Aksai princes to the plain is also confirmed Semyon Bronevsky (1763–1830). The same was noted in 1812 by Butskovsky. Kachkalyk remained in the possession of the Kumyk princes until the second half of the 19th century.

One example from the 19th century, when Kachkalyks claimed their ownership of the lands lying along the Aksay River, there is a notion made by the land committee that

"they (princes – descendants of Sultan-Mut) were paid "yasak" (tax) by Karabulak and Chechnya, and besides, until the Kazi-Mulla's uprising, yasak was paid by the six settlements of Kachalyk, by Aukh and Salatavia, and these lands were considered their full property".

== Colonization ==
- In the late 18th – early 19th centuries, under the command of viceroys Gudovich, Tormasov and Rtishshev, Russia resettled Chechens from the mountainous areas to the Kumyk plateau, Kumyk principalities and along the Terek river, both by bribing Chechen elders and using desire of some Chechens to join Russia. During Yermolov's period the Russian policy had changed, and Chechens were forced to join resistance against Russia.
- In the middle of the 19th century viceroy Vorontsov resumed the policy of resettlement of Chechens to the Kumyk lands, either soliciting or forcing Chechens to occupy Kumyk lands.
- Ingush people were resettled to the lands of Kabardian and Kumyk possessions in the western part of Terek Kumykia.
- Since 1870 to 1877, the number of Chechens in Zasulak Kumykia (Khasavyurt region) grew from 5,912 Aukhian only (Chechen sub ethnicity) to 14,000 generally Chechen, and continued to grew to 18,128 in 1897.
- In 1920s Bolsheviks included some Kumyk lands along Terek river into Chechnya, as the reward for helping to establish Soviet rule in the Northern Caucasus.
- During Soviet period Kumyk lands were the place of resettling mountainous peoples of Dagestan.

The policy continues until today. Due to the continuous resettlements of other peoples to Kumyk lands by the Russian Empire, then the Soviet government, and continuing today in the modern Republic of Dagestan of the Russian Federation, during the 19–21st centuries the native territories of Kumyks have been dramatically reduced; Kumyks became a minority in their own lands.

In the result of the Russian-Kumyk Wars and Russian conquest of the Northern Caucasus state entities of Kumykia lost their independence and were divided into a few administrative regions of Russia.

== Modern geography ==
In terms of administrative division, Kumykia today is divided between a few administrative regions of Russia, such as Republic of Dagestan, Republic of North-Ossetia, Chechen republic and Republic of Ingushetia.

Major historical and cultural importance can be attributed to the Kumyk historical capital Tarki (seat of Shamkhals, Anjiikala (modern-day Makhachkala), Endirey, Aksay (Dagestan), Kazanysh, Boinak (seat of Vice-Shamkhals), Bashly, Erpeli, Karabudaghkent, and Madzhalis.

Other important towns and settlements include Heli, Paraul, Zhengutay, Braguny (modern-day Chechnya), Kizlyar (modern-day Dagestan), Kizlyar (modern-day Ossetia).

== See also ==
- Dagestan
- North Caucasus
