= Aidemir Bardykhanov =

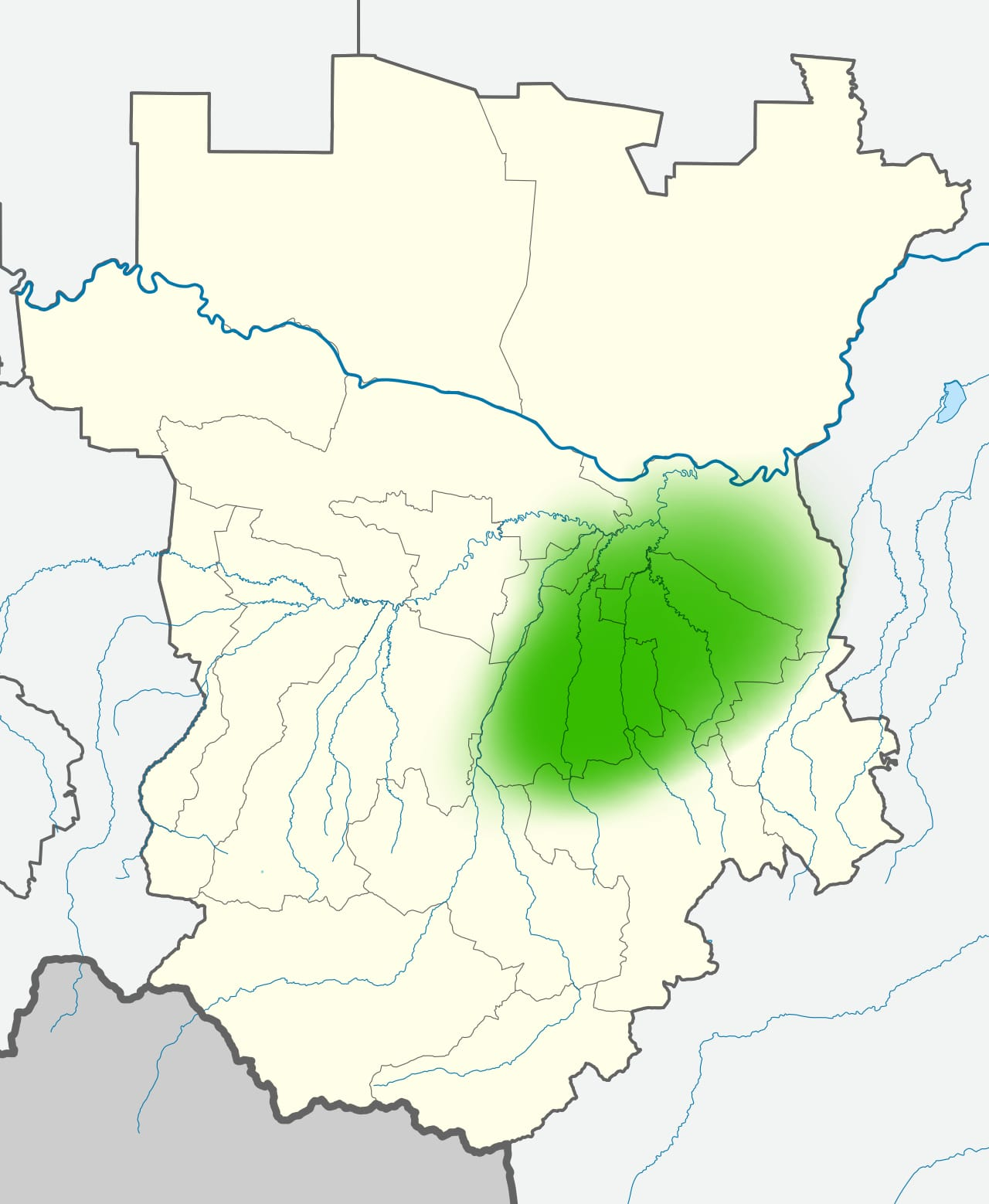
- The Chechen Principality during the reign of Aidemir

Senior Prince of Chechnya
- Reign: July 1732 – 22nd March 1746
- Predecessor: Khasbulat Bamatov
- Successor: Alibek Khasbulatov

Khan of Endirey
- Predecessor: Chopan–Shavkhal of Endirey
- Successor: ?
- Died: 22nd March 1746
- Spouse: Kiztaman Turlova
- Dynasty: Turlov
- Father: Bartikhan Turlov
- Religion: Islam

Aidemir Bardykhanov, (Note: Russian: Айдемир Бардыханов, romanized: Aidemir Bardykhanov) also known as Aidemir Turlov was a prince from the Turlov dynasty and the Senior Prince of the Chechen principality from 1732 to his death in 1746 and was also a Khan of the Endirey Khanate. He is famous for his role in the Battle of Chechen–Aul, where he led Chechen rebels into victory against Russian troops.

== Reign in the Endirey Khanate ==
Aidemir, and another Chechen prince, Musal Chapalov, ruled over the Endirey Khanate. In 1718, the Cossacks attacked and devastated Chechen settlements. As a response, the two princes burnt down several Cossack settlements and Russian Terek fortifications. In 1721, a large army led by Aidemir and Musal attacked Terki, as a result of which 11 Russian soldiers were killed and 21 wounded. The attack was repelled however and the mountaineers suffered heavy casualties.
These attacks led to a Russian punitive expedition in July 1722, resulting in the Battle of Endirey, which was won by the Kumyks and Chechens led by Aidemir. A month later, an even larger army was sent against the Endireyans, but even then the Russians failed to score military victories, so they resorted to attacks and campaigns against civilians, leading to the devastation of the Endirey Khanate, Aukh and Ichkeria. The two Russian campaigns in 1722 led to the downfall of the Khanate.

Between 1728 and 1729, Aidemir's oldest son, Arslanbek Aidemirov, was born.

== Reign in Chechnya ==
=== Rise to power ===
==== Battle of Chechen-Aul ====
Aidemir also held significant influence in Chechnya and is mentioned in the Register for Mountain owners (1732), where he is mentioned as one of the owners of Chechen–Aul, together with Khasbulat Bamatov and Amirkhamza Turlov. In 1732, riots and uprisings again broke out in Chechnya and Endirey. The Senior Chechen prince at that time, Khasbulat Bamatov, was at enmity with Aidemir and wanted to expel him from Chechnya and also restore stability in his state. 1,500–1,700 Russian soldiers were sent to defeat the rebels, but the commander of the detachment, Gustaf Otto Douglas received false information that the rebels had split up and dispersed. Deceived, he only sent 500 troops led by colonel Kokh to Chechen–Aul. Khasbulat Bamatov was also with Kokh and acted as a guide. In the following Battle of Chechen–Aul, the detachment was later destroyed and dispersed by Aidemir, who had gained control over the rebel forces. 125 Russians, along with Khasbulat, were killed and another 75 wounded. As a result, Aidemir became the new Senior Prince of the Principality of Chechnya. Hostilities did not end there however, and later that year, the son of Khasbulat, Alibek Khasbulatov, together with the Russian commander, Danila Efremov, invaded and plundered the principality as a revenge for his fathers death.

==== Aftermath of the battle ====
The death of Khasbulat led to the weakening of the principality, and the start of a decade long conflict for power between the descendants of Aidemir, Khasbulat and other Turlov branches. After the death of Khasbulat, the principality lost most of its land West of the Argun River, where a new principality was formed, with the village Topli as its center. It was led by the son of Khasbulat, Alibek Khasbulatov.

=== Resistance against the Russian Empire and eventual surrender ===
In 1733, a combined Chechen–Crimean force led by Aidemir and Fetih II Giray defeated another Russian army led General Hesse–Homburg on the Belka River. However, in the same year, he took an oath of allegiance to the Russian Empire, and gave his son Bartikhan (Note: In Russian documents known as Bardy Khan of Chechnya) as Amanat (hostage) to Kizlyar, where he would grow up.

=== Crimean invasion ===
In September 1735, a 80,000 strong Crimean army led by Qaplan I Giray invaded Chechnya in order to conquer and impose taxation on its people.

According to many letters and calls from the khan, he (Aidemir) not only did not go to him and did not let people go, but also showed considerable driving away of people from the khan’s troops and other sabotage

Aidemir rejected the ultimatum given to him by Qaplan and in the following Battle of Khankala, a 2,000 strong Chechen militia led by Aidemir defeated the Crimeans, killing up to 10,000 enemies. The Crimean military council decided to abandon the battle and go to Dagestan.

=== Alliance with Iran, last years, death and aftermath ===
The peace between Aidemir and the Russian Empire did not last forever and in 1741, he concluded an agreement with Nader Shah on joint attacks against Russian fortresses. He also allied himself with his former enemy, Alibek Khasbulatov, who also reached agreements with Nader. However, since the following campaigns of Nader Shah in Dagestan between 1741 and 1745 failed, such an operation never took place. Aidemir died on March 22, 1746, and his death was followed by a 2 year long civil war for succession among the Turlov princes and was only resolved in early January 1748 with the recognition of Alibek Khasbulatov as new Senior Prince of the Chechen Principality.

This conflict, along with a series of other internal conflicts, was one of the main reasons for the decline of the Chechen principality. Already after the death of Aidemir and during the succession crisis, the large and populated towns of Shali and Germenchuk broke away from the state and got under the control of the Kabardian prince Dawlatgeray Cherkassky. Aldy, a large village located in modern–day Grozny, got under the control of other Turlov princes. Nevertheless, the principality continued its existence until 1784 with the death of Aidemirs son, Arslanbek Aidemirov.

== Family ==
Aidemir's father, Bartikhan Turlov, was one of the previous Senior princes of the Chechen Principality.
Aidemir's sister, Khanza Bardykhanova was the wife of Khasbulat Bamatov. Aidemir himself was married to a woman named Kiztaman, daughter of a man named Muhammad, who may have been the Turlov prince Muhammad Turlov. If that is the case, then she was the sister of Khasbulat.
With her, Aidemir had 3 sons — His oldest one, Arslanbek Aidemirov (also known as Raslanbek), who would be the future Senior Prince of Chechnya. Bartikhan (also known as Bardy Khan of Chechnya), and Muhammad (also known as Bamat or Mamash).

== Chronology ==
Chronology on the major events in Aidemir's life include:

- ca. 1685: Death of Aidemir's father, Bartikhan Turlov.
- Unknown date: Aidemir becomes an influential prince of the Endirey Khanate.
- 1718–1719: Aidemir and Musal Chapalov raid Cossack villages.
- February 1721: Aidemir and Musal Chapalov conduct a major attack on the Terki fortress, as a result of which 11 Russian soldiers are killed and another 21 wounded. The attack is repelled however with heavy casualties on the attackers side.
- 23 July 1722: Battle of Endirey: Defeat of the Russian army (6,400 strong) sent by Peter the Great by Aidemir's and Musal's forces (5,000–6,000 strong). 80 Russians killed but Endirey is destroyed.
- August 1722: Combined Russian–Kalmyk army (13,730–15,000 strong) invade the Endirey Khanate, Ichkeria and Aukh and devastate the regions and states. Decline of the Endirey Khanate.
- 1728: Khasbulat Bamatov, Aidemir's rival, becomes new senior prince of the Principality of Chechnya
- 1728–1729: Aidemir's oldest son and future successor, Arslanbek Aidemirov is born.
- Early 1732: Aidemir is mentioned as one of the owners of Chechen–Aul.
- Second half of 1732: 1732 Insurgency in Chechnya.
- 7 July 1732: Aidemir, taking control of the rebel forces, destroyed a Russian detachment (500 strong). Khasbulat Bamatov, Aidemir's rival, is killed. 125 Russians killed, 75 wounded. Aidemir comes to power as new senior prince of the Chechen principality.
- End of 1732: Son of Khasbulat Bamatov, Alibek Khasbulatov, together with Don and Terek Cossacks, invade the Chechen principality and plunder it.
- July 1733: Aidemir and his forces in an alliance with the Crimeans defeat a Russian detachment on the Belka River.
- End of 1733: Aidemir takes an oath of allegiance to the Russian Empire and gives his son Bardy Khan as Amanat (hostage).
- 9 September 1735: Crimean army (80,000 strong) are defeated by the Chechen militia (2,000 strong) led by Aidemir. 10,000 Crimeans killed.
- 1741: Aidemir reaches an agreement with Nader Shah on joint actions against Russian fortresses on the Terek River. Aidemir also allies himself with Alibek Khasbulatov.
- 1741–1745: Nader Shah's Dagestan campaign fails, Nader Shah is expelled from Dagestan.
- 22 March 1746: Death of Aidemir.
- March 1746–January 1748: Civil war for succession among the Turlov princes.
- January 1748: Recognition of Alibek Khasbulatov as next senior prince of the Chechen principality.

== See also ==
- Bartikhan Turlov — father of Aidemir and one of the previous Senior Princes of Chechny
- Battle of Terki (1721) — Attack on the Terki Fortress by Aidemir and Musal
- Insurgency in Chechnya (1722) — 2 Russian punitive campaigns against Aidemir due to his attacks on Cossack villages
- Battle of Endirey — successful Chechen–Kumyk ambush led by Aidemir on Russian forces led by Brigadier Veterani
- Khasbulat Bamatov — Aidemir's rival and predecessor
- Battle of Chechen–Aul — start of Aidemir's reign in Chechnya
- Battle of Khankala (1735) — decisive victory of Aidemir and his Chechen forces against the army of the Crimean Khan Qaplan I Giray
- Alibek Khasbulatov — successor and ally of Aidemir and son of Khasbulat Bamatov
- Arslanbek Aidemirov — son and future successor of Aidemir
