= Battle of Khankala (1735) =

1735 military conflict in Chechnya

- Part of Ottoman–Persian War (1730–1735)
Date	6 September 1735
Location	Khankala Gorge, Chechnya
Result	Chechen victory

Belligerents
Chechens	Crimean Khanate; Kuban Nogais

Commanders and leaders
Aidemir Bardykhanov	Qaplan I Giray

Strength
~2,000 (Chechen claim)	~80,000 (Chechen claim, exaggerated) (Note: The total population of the Crimean Khanate in the mid 17th century, which was around 180,000, couldn't physically sustain such a massive army. Even a nation with 20% of their total male population as soldiers could only make up about 18,000 men. Add onto this that some of these forces have to be left back home in order to defend their own nation against Cossack raids and the Russo-Turkish War (1735–1739). Not even this total force of a few thousand men could all just join this one raiding party.)

Casualties and losses
Unknown	~10,000 killed (Chechen claim, exaggerated)

The Battle of Khankala was fought on 6 September 1735 in the Khankala Gorge in present-day Chechnya between Chechen militias and the invading forces of the Crimean Khanate. The battle ended in a decisive Chechen victory and marked the permanent end of Crimean ambitions in Chechnya.

The Chechen forces, led by Prince Aidemir Bardykhanov of Chechen-Aul, successfully ambushed and destroyed two Crimean detachments using terrain, weather, and guerrilla tactics. As a result, the Crimean Khan Qaplan I Giray was forced to abandon his campaign.

== Background ==
During the Ottoman–Persian War (1730–1735), the Ottoman Sultan ordered the Crimean Khan Qaplan I Giray to march toward Persia through the North Caucasus. On 15 May 1735, Qaplan set out with an army. Chechen sources claim he had approximately 60,000 men. In the northwestern Caucasus, he was joined by an additional 20,000 troops from Trans-Kuban Nogai princes. The total invading force as claimed by Chechen sources therefore reached nearly 80,000 men. However, the total population of the Crimean Khanate in the mid 17th century, which was around 180,000, couldn't physically sustain such a massive army. Even a nation with 20% of their total male population as soldiers could only make up about 18,000 men. Add onto this that some of these forces have to be left back home in order to defend their own nation against Cossack raids and the Russo-Turkish War (1735–1739). Not even this total force of a few thousand men could all just join this one raiding party despite support from other princes.

The campaign aimed to subjugate the peoples of the North Caucasus and impose heavy taxation. Previous Crimean expeditions had already devastated large areas of the region, as well as territories in Russia, Ukraine, and Poland. The Chechens, who were also ordered to pay tribute, refused these demands. In response, Qaplan announced his intention to punish the Chechen population militarily.

By early autumn 1735, after passing through Kabardian lands and advancing along the Sunzha River, the Crimean army reached northern Chechnya.

== Prelude ==
In response to the impending invasion, Chechen leaders mobilized militias from Chechen-Aul, Aldy, Gekhi, Starye Atagi, and other lowland settlements, as well as mountain communities. Chechen sources claim that the total number of fighters did not exceed 2,000 men.

The Chechen forces assembled in the Khankala Gorge, southeast of modern Grozny. The narrow, densely forested terrain was ideal for ambushes. Logging was forbidden in the gorge, leaving the forest nearly impassable for large cavalry formations.

Qaplan attempted to incite internal conflict by appealing to his former ally, Prince Aidemir Bardykhanov, ruler of the Chechen plain. However, Aidemir refused to submit, instead organizing resistance and sabotaging the Crimean army by stealing horses and disrupting supply lines.

On 6 September 1735, Qaplan issued an ultimatum demanding annual tribute and the delivery of five women to his harem. The Chechens replied: “Everything for the Khan—only after all of us are dead.”

== Battle ==
Anticipating the attack, the Chechens fortified the Khankala Gorge with ditches, obstacles, and concealed traps. At dawn, under heavy fog, Crimean forces crossed the Sunzha River at several fords. Chechen women supported the fighters by providing food, water, and medical aid during the battle.

Following the failed ultimatum, Qaplan sent 5,000 troops into the gorge for reconnaissance. As soon as the detachment entered the narrow forest corridor, Chechen militias launched a surprise attack from all sides. The Crimean force was almost completely destroyed, and survivors were pursued by Chechen cavalry.

Enraged by the defeat, Qaplan dispatched another 5,000 elite troops led by noble murzas and two princes. This second detachment reached the settlement of Shovda (near modern Gikalo) without resistance. However, the Chechens once again encircled the unit and annihilated it in the forested terrain, where Crimean cavalry was ineffective.

In Chechen sources, up to 10,000 Crimean soldiers were killed. Although victorious, the Chechen militia was exhausted and incapable of facing the full Crimean army in open battle.

Fearing Russian intervention and facing constant Chechen raids, the Crimean military council decided to abandon the campaign and withdraw toward Dagestan.

== Aftermath ==
The Battle of Khankala resulted in a decisive strategic victory for the Chechens. Following the defeat, the Crimean Khanate permanently abandoned its attempts to impose control or tribute over Chechen territory. The battle marked the effective end of the long Chechen–Crimean conflict.
