= List of Kumyk people =

This is a partial list of notable Kumyk people.

== Artists and architects ==
- Murad al-Daghistani — pioneering Iraqi photographer, achieved international recognition for the quality of his photographs which recorded scenes of every-day life and people
- Nasreddin Murat-Khan — Pakistani architect and civil engineer. He is remembered most for designing the national monument, the Minar-e-Pakistan
- Adil-Gerey Daidbekov - Kumyk noble (ozden), engineer and a public figure from Temirkhan-Shura, designed roads and bridges for Daghestan and North-Ossetia.

== Politicians ==
- Ahmed-Saib bey Kaplan — one of the prominent members of Young Turks movement, dissident of Sultan Abdülhamid II and his absolute rule and one of the writers and historians of the Late Ottoman Empire
- Haidar Bammate — politician, one of the ideologists and Foreign Minister of the Mountainous Republic of the Northern Caucasus, who officially proclaimed its independence on 11 May 1918, author of "Visages de l'Islam", Afghanistan's diplomatic appointee in Switzerland.
- Rashid Khan Kaplanov — politician, one of the founders and Minister of Internal Affairs of the Mountainous Republic of the Northern Caucasus, then Minister of Education and Religious Affairs in the fifth and fourth cabinets of Azerbaijan Democratic Republic
- Djelal ed-Din Korkmasov — de facto founder of the Dagestan Autonomous Soviet Socialist Republic, its first First Secretary
- Roza Eldarova — the first woman to hold the highest political office in Dagestan, elected chairwoman of the Presidium of the Supreme Soviet of the Dagestan Autonomous Soviet Socialist Republic in March 1962

== Religious figures ==
- Shaykh Jemaleddin Gazikumuki - Imam Shamil's guide (murshid) and father-in-law.

== Scholars and writers ==
- Najmuddin Bammate — prominent French-Afghan writer, linguist, and Islamic scholar
- İzzet Kantemir — prominent Turkish writer, translator, public figure and medical professor
- Fahrettin Kırzıoğlu — Turkish historian and writer

== Scientists ==
- Murad Kaplanov — radio communication engineer, Chief Constructor of Molniya communication satellite systems, which was developed in Sergei Korolev's design centre

== Statesmen and military ==
=== 16-17th centuries ===
- Sultan-Mahmud of Endirey — prominent leader and ruler, Shamkhal, who defeated Russian invasion of the Eastern Caucasus at the Battle of Karaman, stopping it for a few decades.

=== 18-19th centuries ===
- Tashaw-Hadji — political, military, and spiritual leader of Caucasian resistance in the 1800s, second to Imam Shamil
- Uchar-hadji — 19th century mulla and elderman, who killed two Russian generals at once

=== 20th century ===
- Abdulhakim Ismailov — USSR World War II soldier, he was photographed by Yevgeny Khaldei raising the USSR flag over the Reichstag in Berlin on 2 May 1945, days before Nazi Germany's surrender

== Sports ==
=== Wrestling ===
==== Edge of 19-20th centuries ====
- Al-Klych (Ali-Qılıç) Khasayev — six-time world wrestling champion

==== 20th century ====
- Saypulla Absaidov – 1980 Moscow Olympics wrestling champion in Lightweight category
- Magomedgasan Abushev — 1980 Moscow Olympics wrestling champion in 62 kg category, 1980 Prievidza European champion

==== 21st century ====
- Marid Mutalimov — 2008 Summer Olympics wrestling bronze medalist in 120 kg category
- Bakhtiyar Akhmedov — 2008 Summer Olympics wrestling champion in 120 kg category
- Nariman Israpilov — 2009 Vilnius wrestling European champion in 55 kg category, 2013 Budapest world championship bronze medalist in 55 kg category
- Zaur Uguev — 2020 Summer Olympics wrestling champion in 57 kg freestyle category, 2018 Budapest and 2019 Nur-Sultan wrestling world champion in 57 kg category
- Milana Dadasheva — bronze medalist of two wrestling European Championships
- Ibragim Kadiev — 2x U23 world champion in freestyle wrestling. 2026 European Champion at 86kg.
- Dinislam Bammatov — 1x U23 world vice-champion in greco-roman wrestling.
- Abubakar Khaslakhanau — Olympian, Bronze medalist at the 2024 European Championship in greco-roman wrestling.

=== Martial arts ===
- Dzhamal Adzhigerey — wushu star and actor, 12-time European and 1-time world wushu champion
- Bozigit Ataev — many-time Wushu Sanda world champion.
- Muslim Salikhov — many-time Wushu Sanda world champion, "King of King-fu", often acknowledged as one of the best Wushu Sanda competitors in history
- Marat Gafurov — world pankration (2010), jiu-jitsu (2013) champion and former ONE FC featherweight champion.
- Rustam Khabilov — Combat Sambo World Champion, MMA fighter
- Muhammad Mokaev — UK-based MMA fighter, IMMAF junior bantamweight world champion, UFC member.
- Nassourdine Imavov — France based - UFC middleweight fighter.
- Abdoul Abdouraguimov — France based - two division ARES FC champion.
- Daguir Imavov — France based - ARES FC lightweight.
- Abus Magomedov — Germany based - UFC middleweight fighter.
- Uzair Abdurakov — ACA fighter

=== MuayThai/Kickboxing ===
- Islam Murtazaev - ONE FC kickboxer, who challengend for the Lightweight title.
- Beybulat Isaev — ONE FC kickboxer.
- Elbrus Osmanov — ONE FC fighter.
- Abdulla Dayakaev — former Muay Thai Factory champion and current ONE FC fighter.
- Salimsoltan Aminov — Muay Thai Factory champion.

=== Boxing ===
- Medzhid Bektemirov — light heavyweight titleholder among professionals under version WBC USNBC
- Arslanbek Makhmudov — Heavyweight WBC-NABF champion
- Arthur Biyarslanov — of Kumyk father and Chechen mother, olympian at 2016 Olympics Games representing Canada.
- Sharabutdin Ataev — gold medalist at 2023 Tachkent boxing world championship in the cruiserweight division.
- Dzhambulat Bizhamov — silver medalist at 2021 world championship, many time Russian national champion at middleweight.
- Artur Akavov — challenged once for the WBO world title.

=== Judo ===
- Murad Chopanov — many-time Grand Slam's winner.
- Malik Manatov — Russian U-18 Champion, Master of Sports.

=== Football ===
- Arsen Akayev — professional football player and coach
- Murad Magomedov — professional football player
- Alibek Aliev — professional Swedish football player
- Islamnur Abdulavov — professional football player
- Tymerlan Huseynov — first scorer, who made 100 goals in the Ukrainian Football League
- Tamerlan Musayev — CSKA Moscow player.
