= Schevkal campaign =

Schevkal campaign (1604-1605)
- Part of Russian–Kumyk Wars
Date	1604-1605
Location	Shamkhalate of Tarki
Result	Kumyk victory

Belligerents
Russia	Shamkhalate of Tarki

Commanders and leaders
Ivan Buturlin †	Sultan Mahmud of Endiree

Strength
10,000-50,000	20,000

Casualties and losses
6,000-7,000	unknown

The Schevkal campaign (1604–1605) was a military campaign by the Russian army against the Shamkhalate. These were the first Russian forces to come close to Dagestan since 1594. Russians captured Tarki, but the Kumyks and their allies, under the command of Sultan Mahmud, routed the Russian army at the battle of Karaman. Russian commander, Ivan Buturlin, was killed in the battle, along with 7000 Russian soldiers. The Shamkhalate of Tarki retained independence, and Russian expansion in Dagestan halted for 118 years.

== Bibliography ==
- Егоршина, Петрова (2023). История русской армии [The history of the Russian Army] (in Russian). Moscow: Edition of the Russian Imperial Library. ISBN 978-5-699-42397-2.
- Karamzin, Nikolay (2020) [1824]. История Государства Российского [History of the Russian state]. Азбука. ISBN 978-5-4484-4482-1.
