= Andrei Shadrin =

Cossack leader in late 16th century

Andrei or Andreya Shadrin (Russian: Андрей Шадрин) was a Cossack leader who founded a fortress at Endirey in the late 16th century. It was named Andreyevo or Andreyaul in his honor until 1991.

This story may be a folk tale. Baddeley, citing no source, says that in 1579 Yermak, “Andreya Shadrin” and another outlaw took counsel at the mouth of the Volga. Yermak went north, Andreya went south and fortified “Terkee’’ and later settled at the present Enderey. He identifies Terkee with a previous “Tioumen” on the lower Terek. [Tyumen (ru:Тюмень (Северный Кавказ)) was destroyed by flood and replaced by Terkee or Tersky Gorod. Yermak started for Siberia some time between 1579 and 1582.] Barrett uses “Andrei” with no last name. He says the story was first recorded by captain Johann-Gustav Gerber in his 1728 description of Endirey. P.L Iudin, writing in 1914, could find no documentation for Andrei. Barrett says the Yermak-Andrei link was recorded in 1856 but does not pursue the matter. He mentions other stories about an Andrei who led various groups or founded various places in the North Caucasus.
