= Aktash (river) =

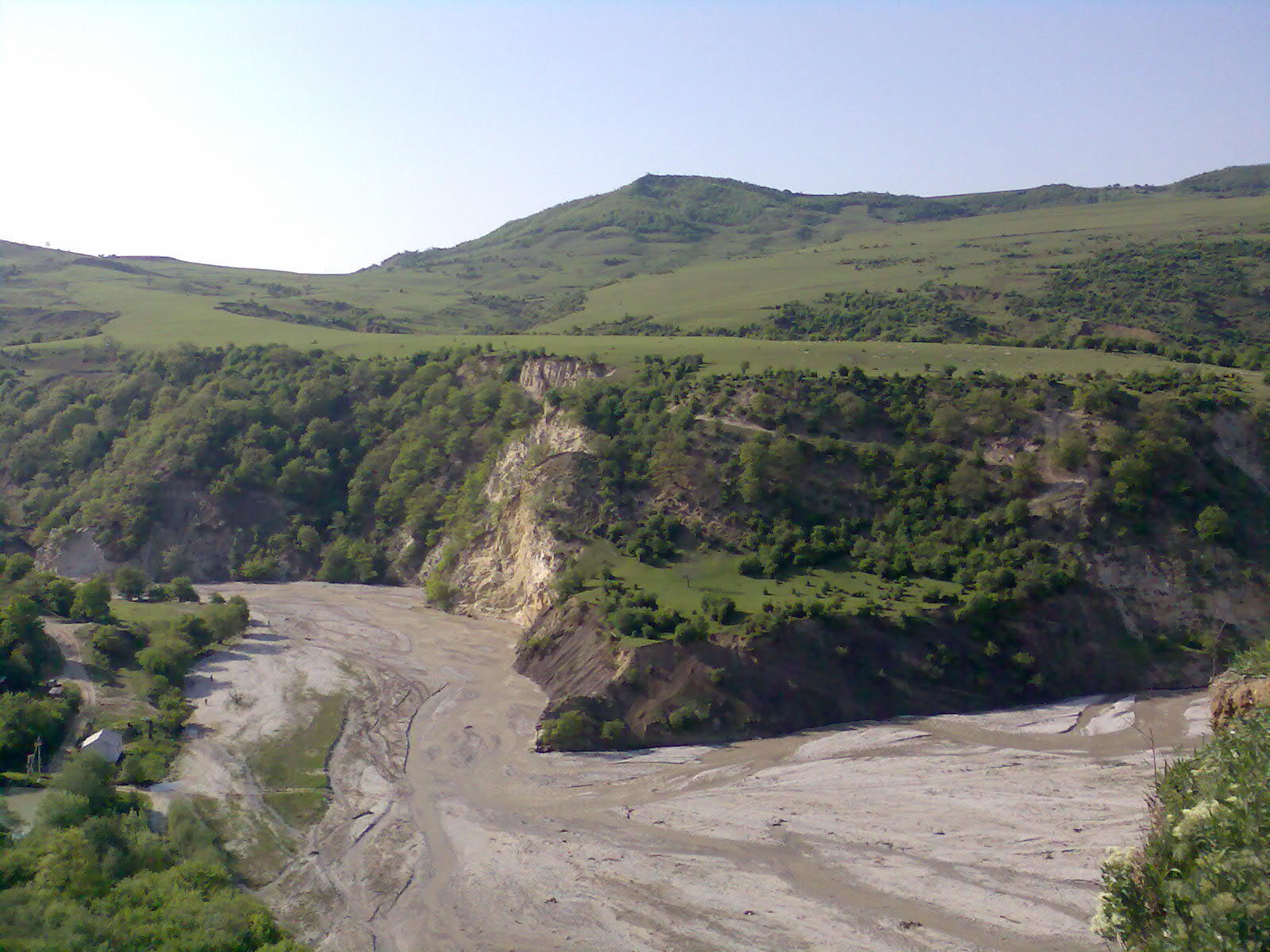

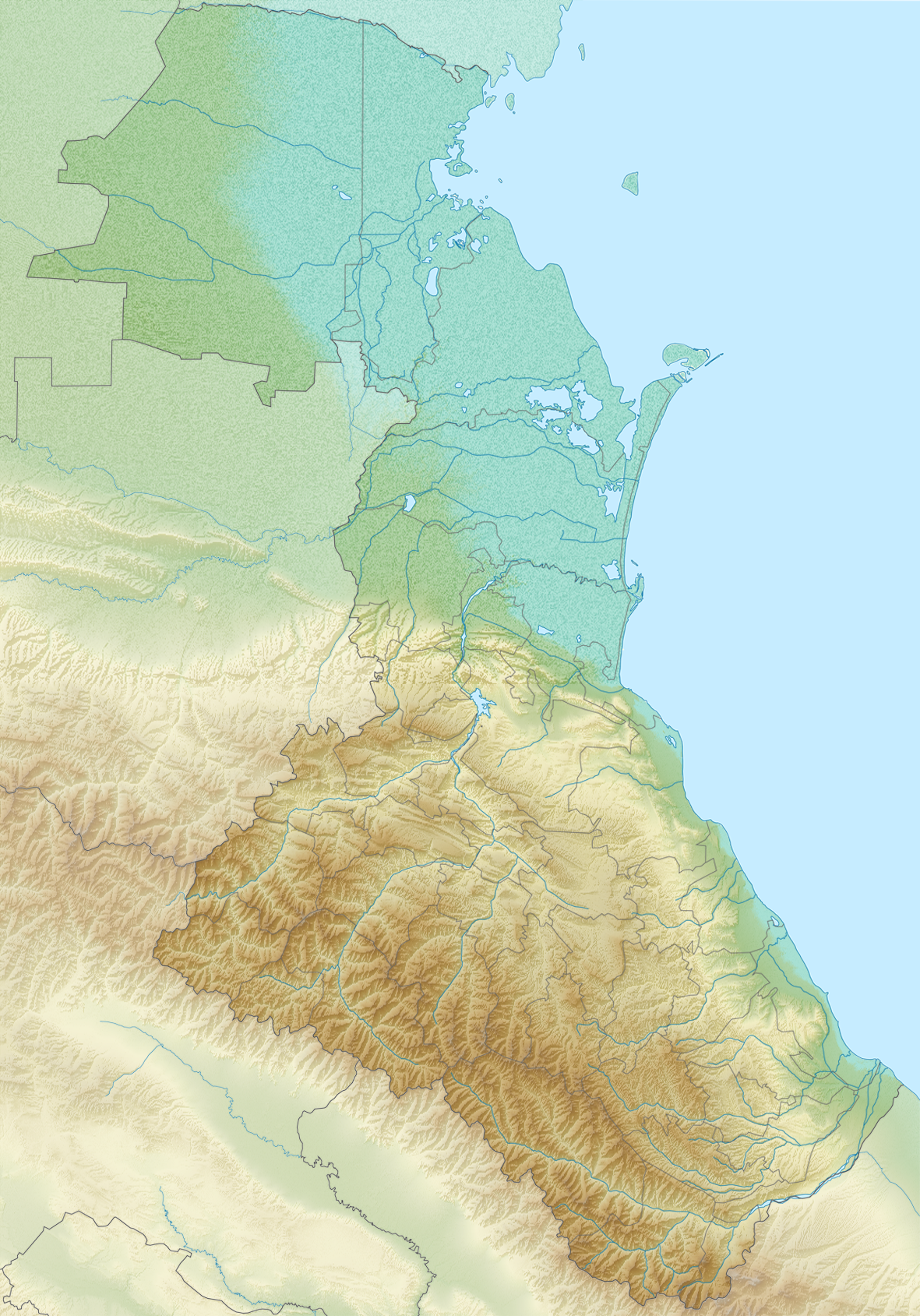
- Location within Republic of Dagestan

Location
- Country: Russia

Physical characteristics
- Mouth: Sulak
  - coordinates: 43.3578°N 47.0326°E
- Length: 156 km (97 mi)
- Basin size: 3,390 km^{2} (1,310 sq mi)

Basin features
- Progression: Sulak→ Caspian Sea

The Aktash (Russian: Акташ; Kumyk: Акъташ, romanized: Aqtaş) is a river in the Kasbek and Khasavyurt districts of the Republic of Daghestan in Caucasian Russia. It is 156 kilometers (97 mi) long, with its width varying from 1.5 meters (5 ft) to 160 meters (520 ft). It has an overall slope of 14%. Its watershed is 3,390 square kilometers (1,310 sq mi).

== Name ==
Aktash derives from the Turkic ak- ("white") and taş ("stone").

== History ==
The river's basin was settled by the Mountain Cossacks from the 1520s. The Don Cossacks arrived under Andrei Shadrin in the late 1570s, founding Andreyevo (present-day Endirey). The two groups eventually formed the Terek Cossacks. The mountainous area of the river was depopulated in 1877 by the Russian Adjutant-General Svistunov to prevent possible uprisings in support of Alibek Haji.

Diversion of the river for irrigation now means that it usually does not reach the Caspian Sea during the summer months.

== Tributaries ==
Major tributaries include:

- Aksay
- Salasu
- Tsyrkikal
- Yaryksu
