= Terki Fortress =

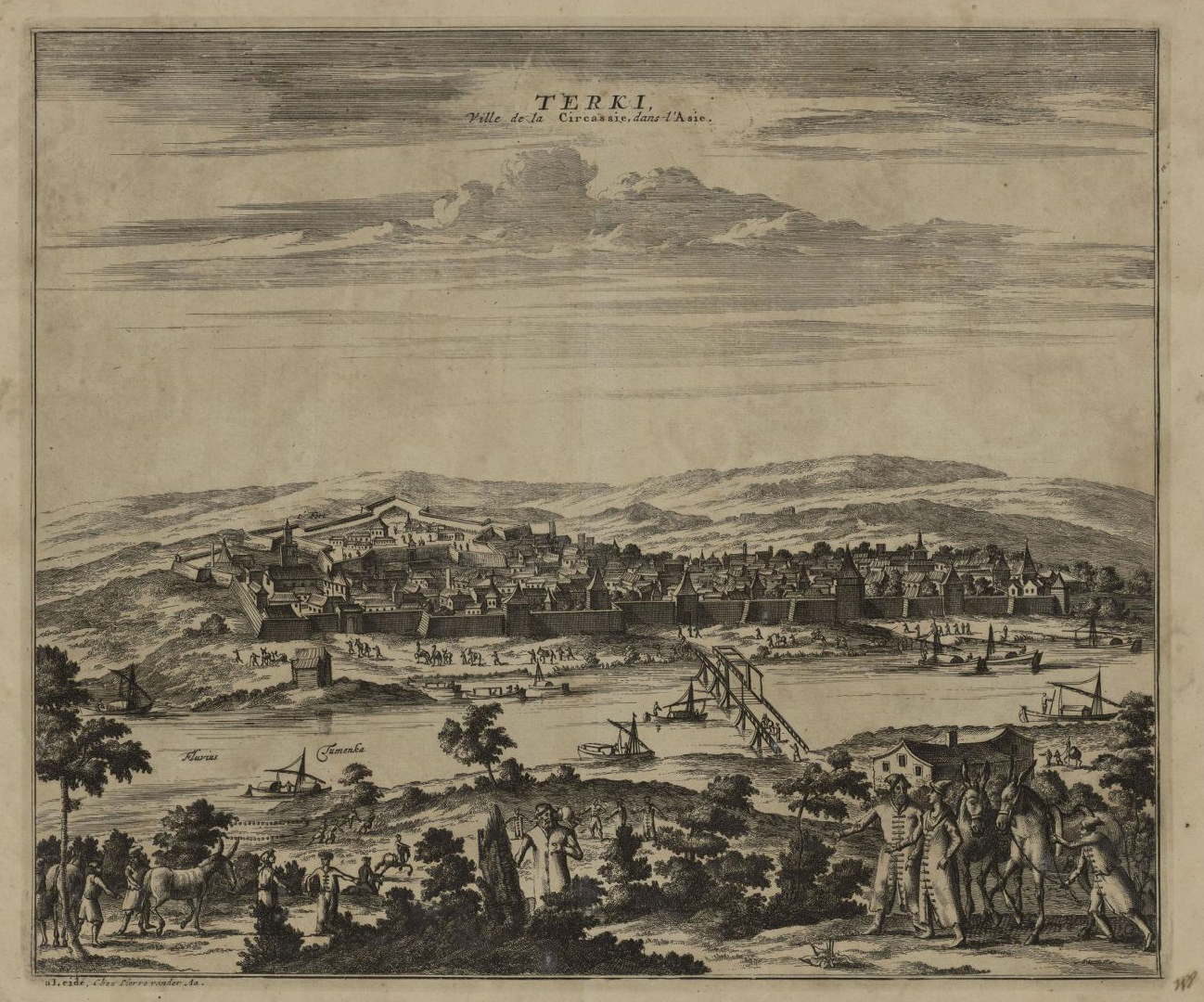
Oblique view of Terki, drawn by Pieter van der Aa, 1727

Terki fortress, Terka, or Terek (originally Shamkhalian Tyumen's fortress, later Tersky redoubt, sometimes mentioned as Terskiy town) was a Russian fortress in the Caucasus in the 16-18th centuries. It was originally erected at the mouth of the Sunzha river on the lands of the Tyumen Khanate, it was demolished several times, restored and transferred.

Later the town was formed in the Terek delta on the Tyumenka River, which had later disappeared in the XVIII century. The territory where the town existed corresponded to modern northeastern Dagestan (Kizlyarsky District, the left bank of the Stary Terek channel northeast of Kizlyar).

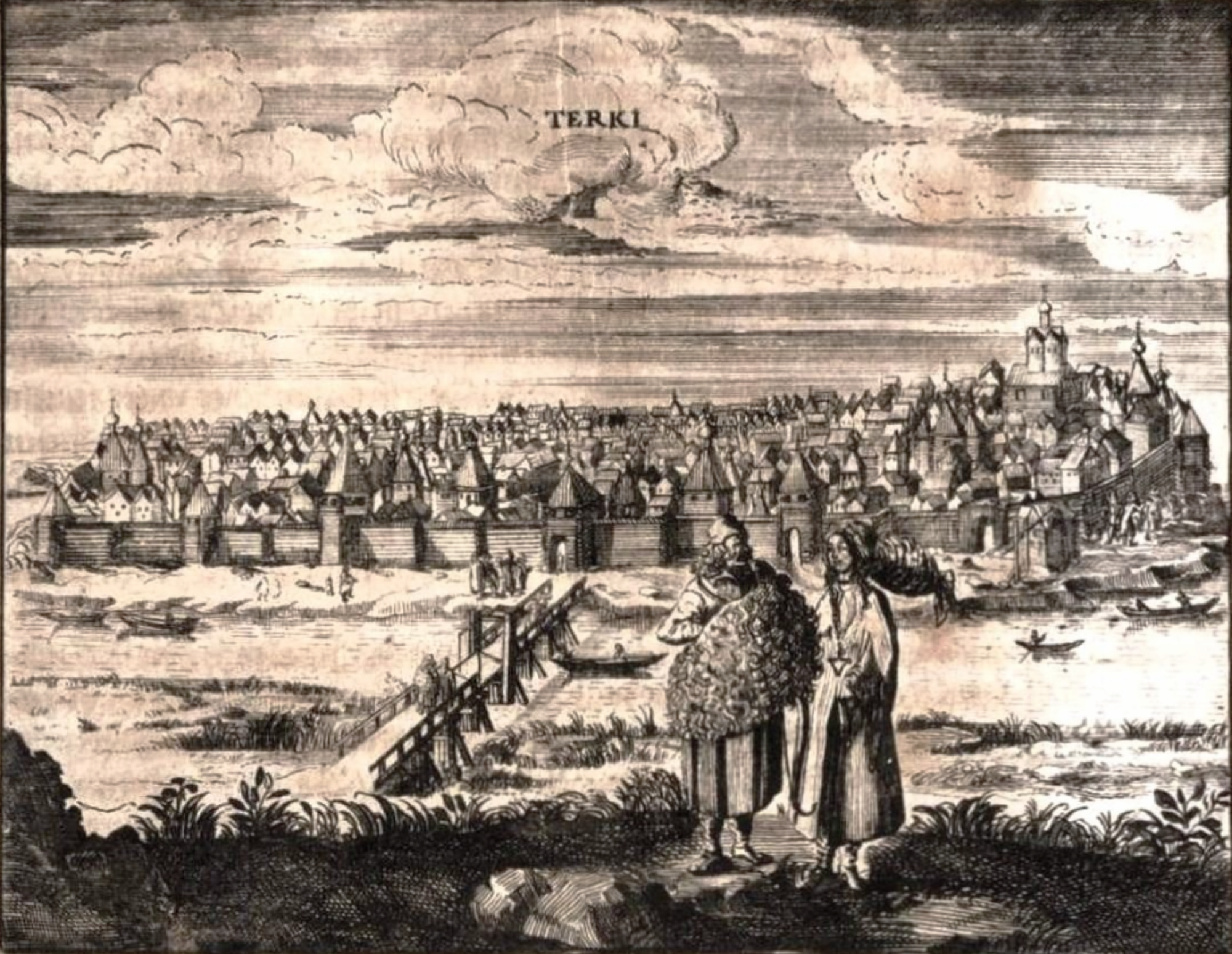
The town of Terek, drawn by Adam Olearius, published in 1647

The town of Terek was a stronghold serving the expansion of the Russian state in the North Caucasus and the Western Caspian region, its location made it an important military and strategic point on the southern outskirts of the country. Administratively, it belonged to the Astrakhan region, had his own governor, who, in turn, was subordinate to the Astrakhan governor. In its heyday (17th century - the first years of the 18th century), the town was the second largest and most important in the region after Astrakhan, many trade routes were controlled here. In the first years of the 18th century, the successful development of the Terek city was interrupted as a result of the raid of the Lesser Nogai Horde (Old Russian "Kuban Tatars"). The city turned into a purely military settlement, which was soon abandoned.

In 1708, North Caucasian rebels led by the Bashkir prince Murat Kuchukov stormed the fortress and captured most of it, but failed to take the citadel. The rebels were pushed out by Russian and Kalmyk reinforcements and their leader, Murat, was captured and executed. In 1721, a large army of Chechens and Kumyks led by the Turlov prince Aidemir Bardykhanov attacked the fortress again, but were repelled by the garrison with heavy losses.
