= Kumyks =

Turkic ethnic group in the North Caucasus

Coordinates: 42.3873°N 47.9867°E

Kumyk: къумукълар, qumuqlar
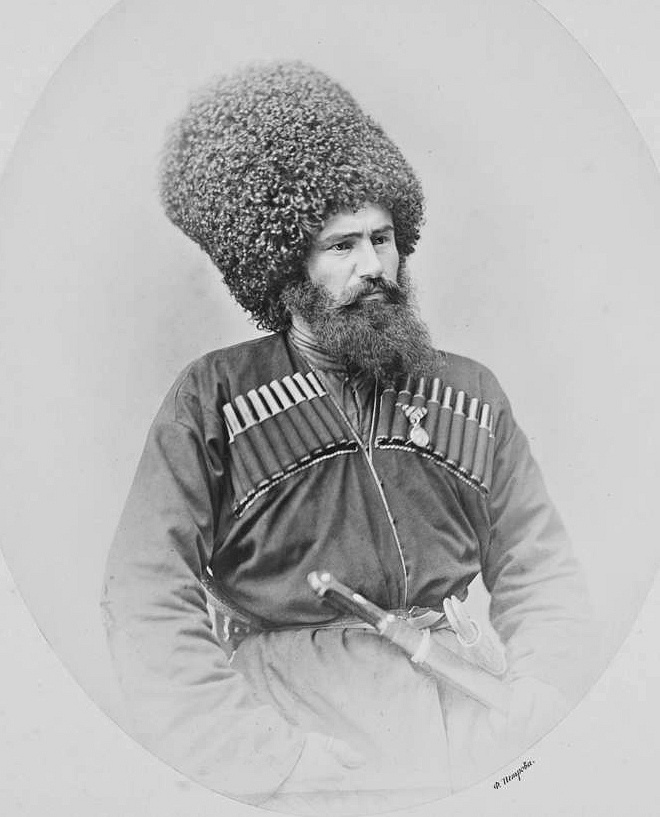
- Abdul-Wahab son of Mustafa — a prominent Kumyk architect of the 19th century pictured wearing a traditional Caucasian papakha and chokha.

Total population
- c. 505,000

Regions with significant populations
- Russia: 503,060 (2010)
- Turkey: 1,700
- Uzbekistan: 1,200 (2016)
- Ukraine: 718 (2001)
- Kazakhstan: 481 (2009)
- Belarus: 360 (2009)
- Latvia: 33 (2020)

Languages
- Kumyk language

Religion
- Sunni Islam

Related ethnic groups
- Balkars, Karachays, Karapapakhs, Volga Tatars, Lipka Tatars, Kazakhs, Kyrgyz, Karakalpaks, Crimean Tatars, Siberian Tatars, Dobrujan Tatars, Chinese Tatars, Nogais, Bashkirs, North Caucasian peoples

Kumyks or Kumyk people (Kumyk: Къумукълар, romanized: Qumuqlar, Russian: Кумыки) are a Turkic ethnic group living in Dagestan, Chechnya and North Ossetia. They are the largest Turkic people in the North Caucasus.

They traditionally populate the Kumyk Plateau (northern Dagestan and northeastern Chechnya), lands bordering the Caspian Sea, areas in North Ossetia, Chechnya and along the banks of the Terek River. They speak the Kumyk language, which until the 1930s had been the lingua franca of the Northern Caucasus.

Territories where Kumyks have traditionally lived, and where their historical state entities used to exist, are called Kumykia (Kumyk: Къумукъ, Qumuq). All of the lands populated by Kumyks were once part of the independent Tarki Shamkhalate.

== Population and present settlement area ==
Kumyks comprise 14% of the population of the Republic of Dagestan, the third-largest population of Chechnya, and the fifth-largest population of North Ossetia, all of which are parts of the Russian Federation.

Kumyks are the second largest Turkic-speaking ethnic group after Azerbaijanis in the Caucasus, the largest Turkic people of the North Caucasus and the third largest ethnic group of Dagestan.

According to the Russian national census of 2010 there were more than 500,000 Kumyks in Russia.

=== Russian Federation ===
In terms of administrative division in their native lands, Kumyks today are mostly divided between a few administrative regions of Russia, such as Republic of Dagestan, Republic of North-Ossetia, Chechen Republic.

| Russian'a territorial subject (krai, oblast, republic etc.) | Population | | |
| Russian'a territorial subject (krai, oblast, republic etc.) | 2002 | 2010 | 2021 |
|---|---|---|---|
| Dagestan | 365,804 | 431,736 | 496,455 |
| North Ossetia-Alania | 12,659 | 16,092 | 18,054 |
| Khanty-Mansi autonomous okrug | 9,554 | 13,849 | 13,669 |
| Chechnya | 8,883 | 12,221 | 12,184 |
| Stavropol krai | 5,744 | 5,639 | 5,213 |
| Yamal-Nenets Autonomous Okrug | 2,613 | 4,466 | 4,838 |
| Moscow oblast | 818 | 1,622 | 1,704 |
| Moscow | 1,615 | 2,351 | 1,576 |
| Saint Petersburg | 895 | 1,018 | 1,340 |
| Astrakhan oblast | 1,356 | 1,558 | 1,240 |
| Rostov oblast | 1,341 | 1,511 | 1,100 |
| the table contains regions with the population exceeding 1000 people only. | | | |

=== Turkey and the Middle East ===
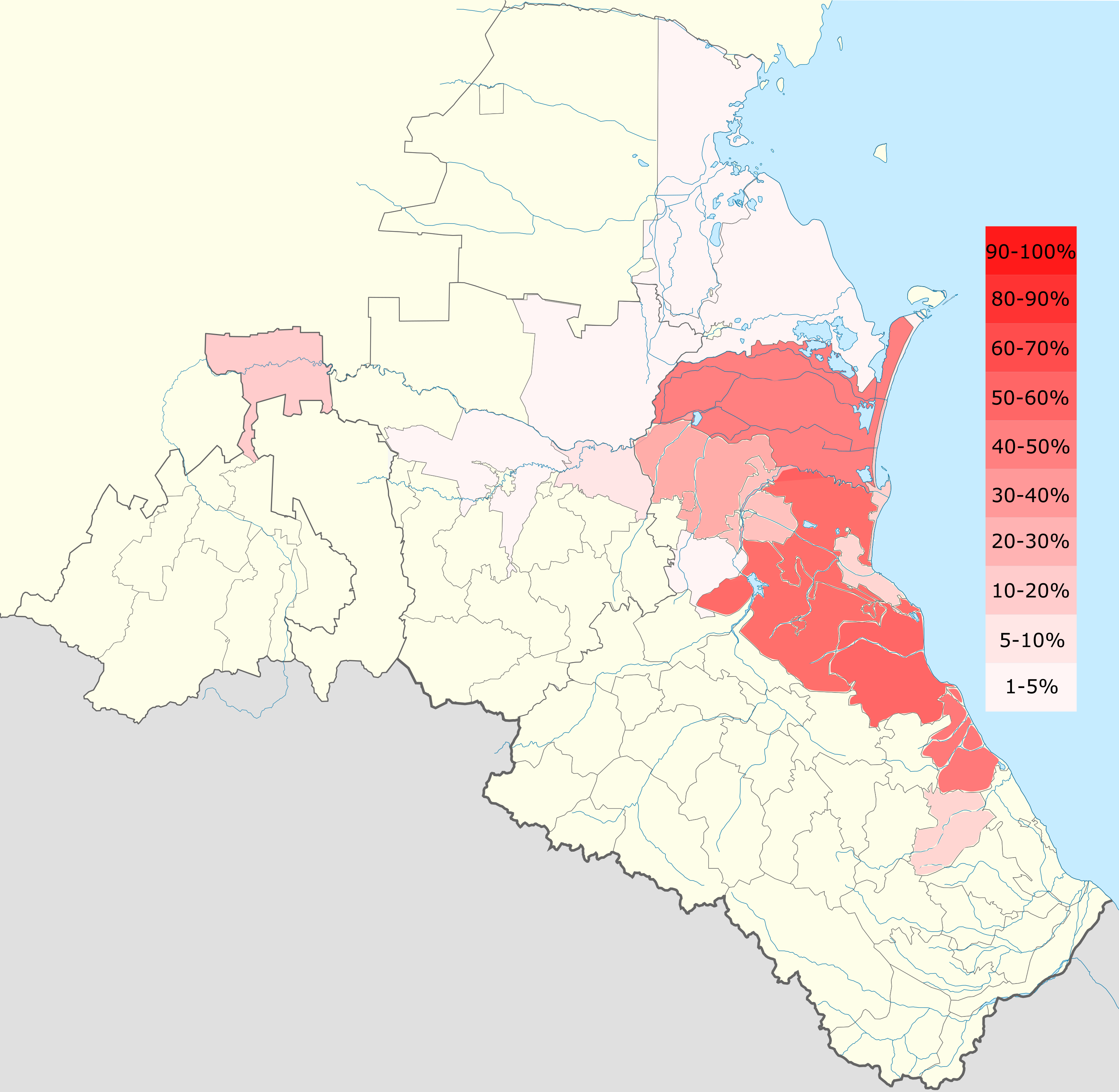
Kumyk population in its native areas of the Northern Caucasus

In the 19th century, during and following the Caucasian War, numbers of Kumyks were subject to or willingly resettled (made hijra) to the Ottoman Empire as a result of Russian deportation campaigns in the region.

In the 1910s–1920s, during the Russian Revolution, another emigration wave to Turkey took place. Among the muhajirs (migrants) of that period were many prominent Kumyk nobility.

Kumyks also used to move to Syria and Jordan, where a few Kumyk families still live. The Syrian village of Dar-Ful was established in 1878-1880 by Kumyk emigrants.

There is no official state census of ethnic minorities in Turkey (ethnic or racial censuses are outlawed), but according to the studies of 1994–1996, there were more than 20 settlements with Kumyk population.

== Ethnonym ==
The majority of researchers (Bakikhanov, S. A. Tokarev, A. I. Tamay, S. Sh. Gadzhieva) derive the name "Kumyk" from a Turkic ethnonym Kimak, or from another name for Kipchaks — Cuman.

According to P. Uslar, in the 19th century the names "Kumyk" and "Kumuk" pertained to the Turkic speaking population of the Northern Caucasian lowlands. In Dagestan, Chechnya and Ingushetia, the name Kumyk, or originally Kumuk pertained to the Kumyks only. Y. Fyodorov wrote, based on sources from the 8–19 cc., that "Gumik — Kumyk — Kumuk" is originally a Dagestani toponym from the Middle Ages.

In various Russian, European, Ottoman and Persian sources Kumyks were also called Dagestan Tatars (or Dagestan Turks), Circassian and Caucasus Tatars.

== Origin ==
There is no universal opinion regarding the origin of the Kumyks, and disputed debates have continued to even today. Some scholars propose that the population of the Kumyk plains of the 8th-10th centuries were directly ancestral to modern Kumyks. A view close to that is that the Kumyks appeared in Dagestan along with the Oghuric Khazars in the 8th century and stayed afterwards, in part due to Kumyk verbal tradition carried through ages some proverbs and sayings coming from the times of the Khazar Kaghanate. however, the narrative is questioned due to the fact the Kumyk language belongs to the Kipchak languages of Turkic family, which is largely unintelligible to the Chuvash language (the last surviving Oghur people). Thus, some other scholars believe that the Kumyk identity appeared in Dagestan in the 12th-13th centuries as part of the Kipchak migration.

S. Tokarev wrote that:

...Kumyks have very diverse ancestry. Its ancient stratum is, undoubtedly, pre-Turkic, Japhetic. There is an opinion that people of Kami, Kamaks, mentioned as long ago as by Ptolemaeus, are historically related to Kumyks. Their turkization started at the times of Khazars already, in the second half of the first millennium... Arrival of Cumans extended Turkic element further. That time point, marked by dissolution of the Khazar Kaghanate, is likely to be the period of the core formation for Kumyks, although some researchers (Bartold) linked their appearance to the latter period, when remains of Cumans defeated by Mongols fled to the lands of Dagestan.

A modern interpretation was proposed that "from the Turkified Lezgins, Kumyks also emerged".

However, professor of Caucasus studies L. Lavrov doubted the "Turkification" hypothesis of Kumyk origin:

It's unlikely that Kumyks might be Turkified Dagestanians, as some claim. Rather, their ancestors are considered to be Kipchaks, Khazars and, probably, other Turks of the early Middle Ages. It would be preferable to also identify whether Kamaks, who used to be settled in the North Dagestan in the beginning of our era, are related to Kumyks.

Another prominent Russian Orientalist, V. Minorsky, proposed his adjustment to the views mentioned, stating that:

Today's Kumyk Turks, who populate North Eastern part of Dagestan, along the shore, possibly come from the basic Khazar stratum, strengthened and assimilated by the later re-settlers from the Kipchak steppes.

According to Soviet archives, it was believed the final stages of the Kumyk ethnogenesis stretched from the 12th-17th centuries. This is because some of the Turkic peoples who assimilated into the Kumyk nation were those of Tumens from the Tumen Khanate (Caucasian Tumen), which emerged in the 15th century as a fragment of the dissolved Golden Horde that was earlier defeated by the Timurid Empire of Timur; those of Bothe Bogans, Sople and pre-Cuman Turks, who populated the Botheragan-Madjar region in the 7th century, which encompassed the vast North Caucasian plains.

== History ==
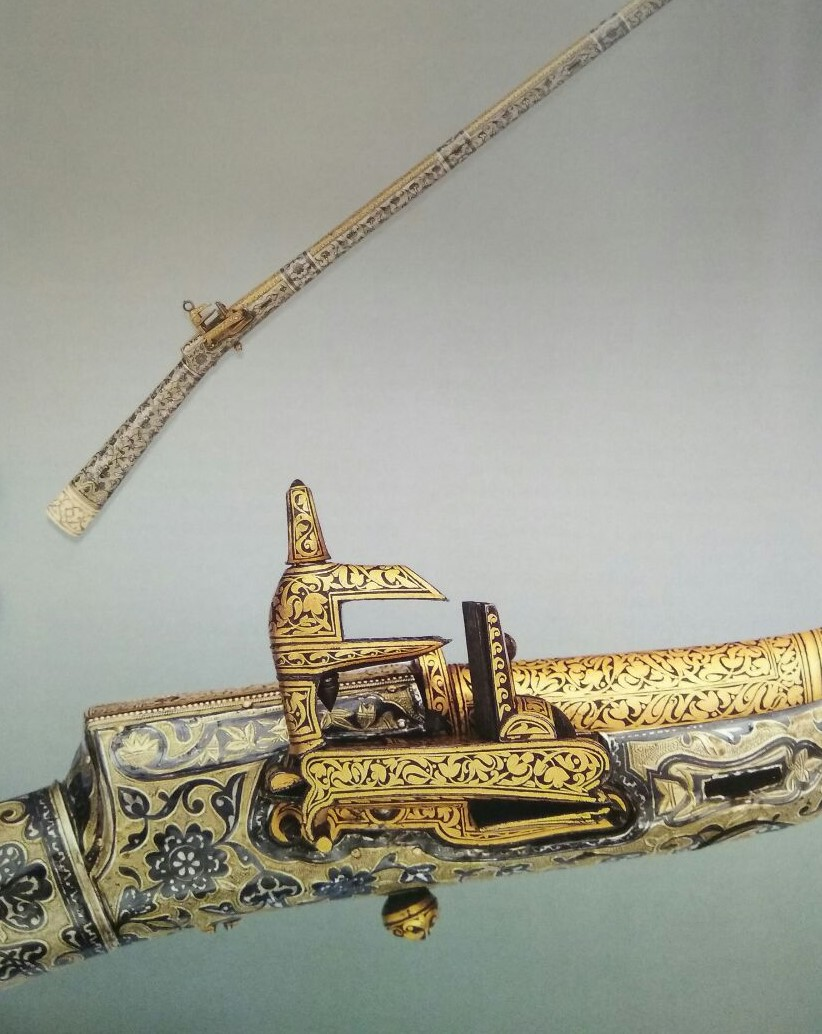
Rifle of the Kumyk Shamhal of Tarki, 19th century, Metropolitan Museum of Art, New-York

Kumyks historically were related to the states of the Caucasian Huns, Khazars, Cuman-Kipchaks, and the Golden Horde.

=== Early to Timurid's war era ===
The beginning of the Kumyk nation is often considered to be in the Oghuric Khazar Khaganate. Over time, the Kumyks experienced two distinctive waves of Kipchak migrations; the first wave were from the Kipchaks of Cumania, many of which remained largely Tengrists, Christians, or irreligious, and they came here largely for trading and relations only. The second wave likely traced origin to the infamous Kipchak–Karluk war between Tokhtamysh of the Golden Horde and Timur of the Gurkani Empire; the Karluks largely destroyed the Kipchak state to a point it could not recover, causing some Kipchak soldiers to be lost in Dagestan. Having carried on the deep Turco-Mongol traditions and at the same time also Islamised religiously, these Kipchaks went on to completely Kipchakise the ancient Kumyks into the modern Kumyks, whose heritages remain deeply Caucasian but with a greater and more unique Turco-Mongol Borjigin influence.

Other Kumyk states included the Endirey Principality, Utamish Sultanate, Tumen Possession, Braguny Principality, Mekhtuly Khanate, Kaytag Uzminate and others. However, until the 19th century, the Kumyks were a largely feudal, decentralized entity of varied strategical geographic and political importance for Russia, Persia and the Ottomans, headed by a leader called the Shamkhal (originally Shawkhal, in Russian sources Shevkal). The Kumyk polity known as the Shamkhalate of Tarki was mentioned as early as the 14th century by Timurid historians.

=== Expansion of the Russian state, Ottoman Empire, and Persia ===
In the 16th century, Kumyk rulers tried to balance their relationships with their three neighbouring states, and as a result the Shamkhalate established itself as a considerable regional power. The two empires and yet-to-be one Russian state considered the Caspian area as their influence domain.

Shamkhal Chopan became a subject of the Ottoman Empire in the late 16th century, and participated in the 1578–1590 Ottoman-Persian War.

The 1560s marked the start of the numerous campaigns of the Imperial Russian Army against Kumyks, provoked by the requests of the Georgians and Kabardians. Commander Cheremisinov seized and plundered the capital of Tarki in 1560. The Tumen Khanate, allied with the Shamkhalate also resisted the invasion, but was conquered by Russia in 1588. The Russians established the Terki stronghold (Not to be mistaken for Tarki) in its former capital. Tumen ruler Soltaney fled to the protection of Sultan-Mahmud of Endirey, recognized today as a pan-Caucasian hero. In 1594, the other campaign of Khvorostinin in Dagestan was organised, during which Russian forces and Terek Cossacks seized Tarki again, but were blocked by the Kumyk forces and forced to retreat to Terki, which resulted in a stampede.

In 1604–1605, Ivan Buturlin conducted one more campaign against the Kyumks, often known as the Schevkal campaign. This also failed and resulted in a significant loss for Russia at the Battle of Karaman. The united forces of the Dagestani peoples under the banners of the Kumyk Shamkhalian, Prince Soltan-Mahmud of Endirey prevailed, and according to the prominent Russian historian Nikolay Karamzin, stopped Russian expansion for the next 118 years until the rule of Peter I.

In 1649 and 1650, Nogai leader Choban-murza sought the protection of their allies in the Shamkhalate. Russia, at war with the Nogais, sent 8,000 men in order to force the nomadic tribe to return to Russian territory. Surkhay-Shawkhal III attacked and routed Russian troops at the Battle of Germenchik. Kumyk military success continued from 1651 to 1653, when the Kumyks, this time in an alliance with Safavid forces, destroyed the Russian fortress at the Sunzha River. Shah Abbas II intended to strengthen the Persian hold on the Kumyk lands, which didn't match with Surkhay's plans. In an alliance with Kaytag Uzmi Rustem, Surkhay III confronted Persians but was forced to withdraw. Nevertheless, the high losses disrupted the Shah's intentions of building fortresses in the Kumyk lands.

==== Resistance to Peter I ====
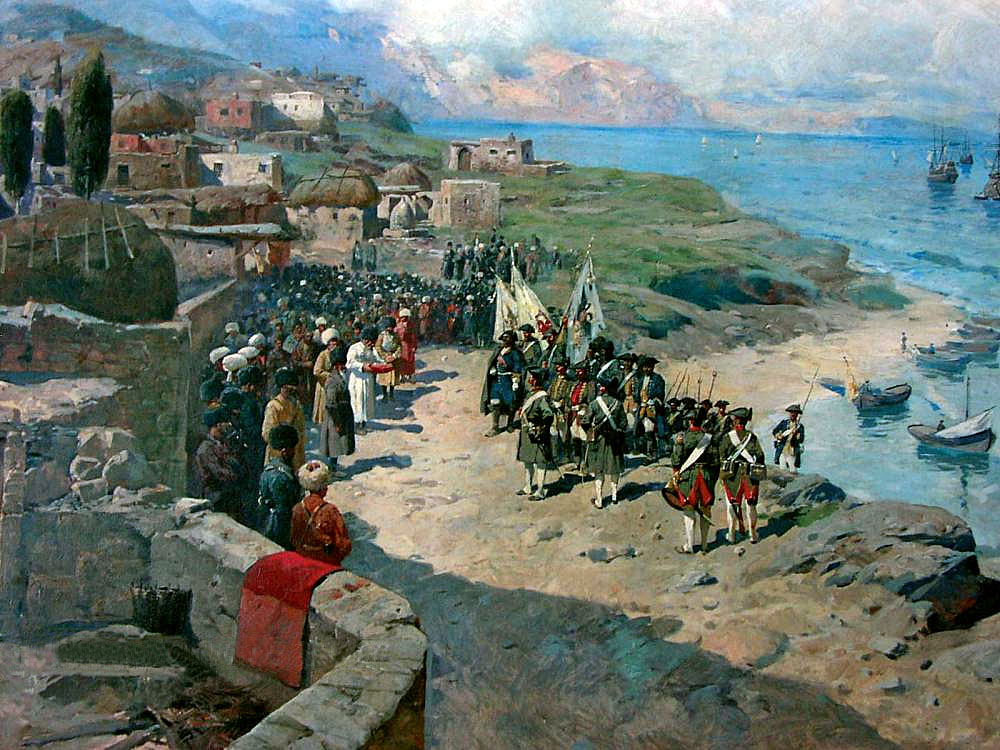
Roubaud, Peter I in Tarki, the Capital of Tarki Shamkhalate

In the 18th century, Russian Emperor Peter I organised the Persian campaign of the 1722–1723. The Endirey principality was the first to oppose the Russian forces, and despite their defeat, caused great losses which shocked the Emperor. Kumyks of the Utamish Soltanate also fiercely resisted during the Battle at the River Inchge. Peter I stated afterwards:

If these people had a comprehension of the Military Science [Art], no other nation could take arms against them.

The Tarki Shamkhalate initially took a pro-Russian stance, but after a new Russian fortress had been built they confronted Russia again. However, this time the Shamkhalate could not unite the neighboring local peoples and remained alone in their struggle. Russian historian Sergey Solovyov wrote:

In October 1725 general-majors Kropotov and Sheremetev embarked to devastate the possessions of the Shamkhal and burned down twenty settlements, including Tarki, the capital of the Shamkhal, which comprised 1,000 households; the total number of destroyed households amounts to 6,110. Shamkhal, having only 3,000 troops, couldn't resist the overwhelming number of Russians, who had in their ranks 8,000 Cossacks and Kalmyks only, not counting the regular troops, and two infantry regiments and two cavalries; Adil-Girey [Shamkhal] left Tarki and together with the Turkish ambassador had sent letters to other mountaineer possessors, asking for help, but got a refusal.

=== Caucasian War ===
Russian 19th century general Gregory Phillipson, known for his important actions in subjugating the Adyghe and Abaza ethnic groups at the left flank of the Caucasian front in Circassia, wrote:

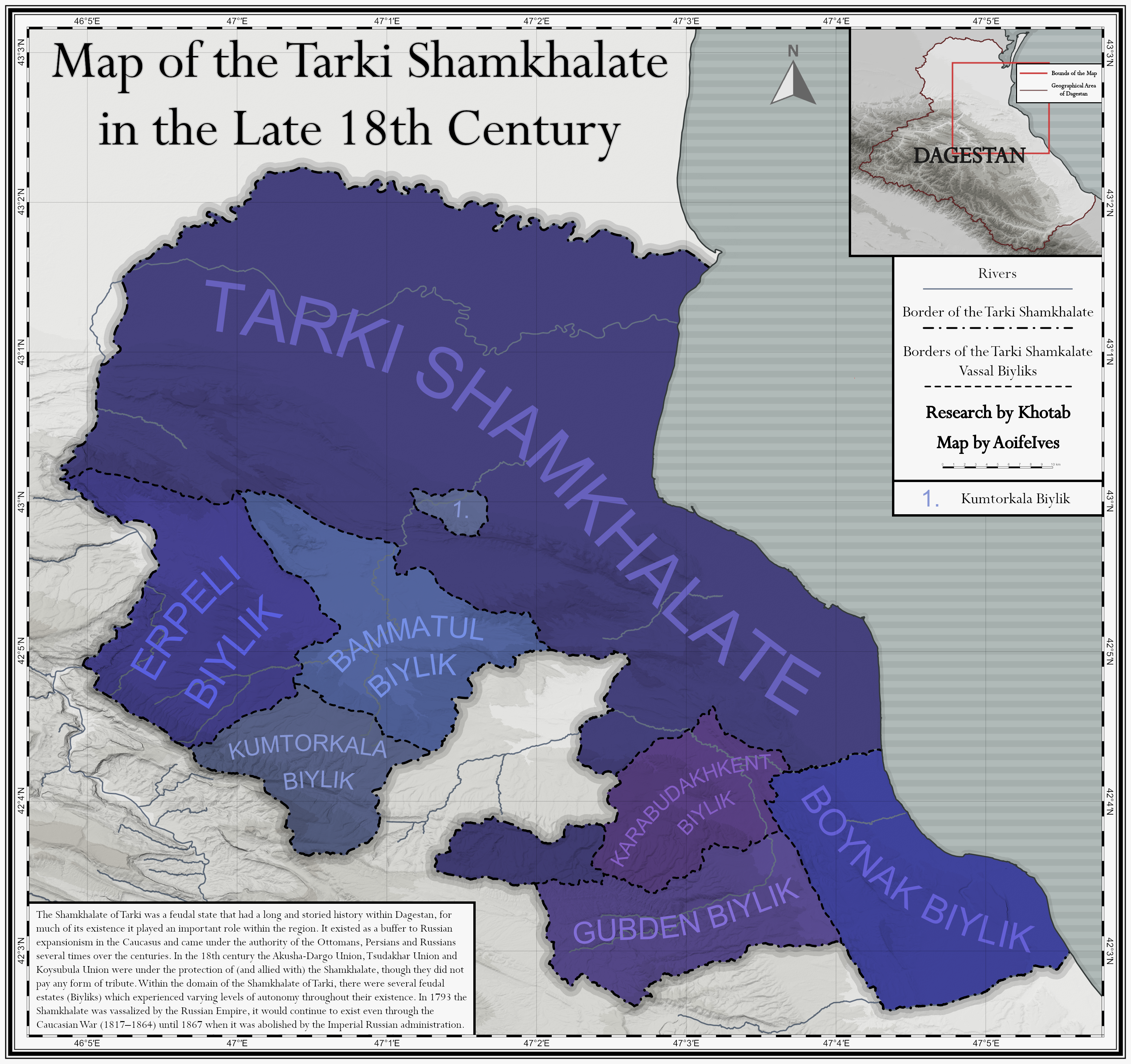
Map of the Shamkhalate of Tarki in the late 18th century.

Map of Northern Kumykia during the late 1700s.

I had vague knowledge about Caucasia and the Caucasian war, although professor Yazikov on the lectures in the military geography used to tell about one and the other; and according to his words it turned out that the most valiant and inimical to us tribe was that of the Kumyks.

Kumyks were one of the major forces in the late 18th century Sheikh Mansur's insurgence. Kumyk prince Chepalow, in alliance with Mansur made several attempts to attack the Russian stronghold of Kizlyar. In the final battle, Mansur led the Kumyk forces himself. Despite the formal acceptance of the Russian sovereignty over the Shamkhals at the beginning of the Caucasian war (resulting from the Treaty of Gulistan), there were numerous revolts in Kumykia. In 1825 the village of [Old] Aksay was destroyed and 300 men from the settlement were gathered for their participation in the insurgence against Russian Empire led by the Chechen leader Taymiyev Biybolat, and murdered when Ochar-Haji, one of the Kumyks, killed two Russian generals on the spot. In the same year the people of Endirey joined forces with mountain communities against the Russians.

In total, there were at least five revolts in Shamkhalate and on the Kumyk plateau (called also Kumyk plains): the Anti-Russian revolt, resulting in the defeat of Northern Kumyks (Endirey and Aksay principalities) and the then-disestablished Mekhtula Khanate, the Shamkhalate Revolt of 1823, participation in Beybulat Taymiyev's revolt (who though recently had pledged allegiance to Russia), the Shamkhalate Revolt of 1831, the revolt at the Kumyk plains in 1831 and the Shamkhalate Revolt of 1843.

There were also preparations for an insurgency on the Kumyk plains in 1844 and for a general Kumyk insurgency in 1855, which had been planned as a joined action with the advance of Imam Shamil, but the advance didn't progress enough into the Kumyk lands. In the insurgency in Dagestan in 1877–1878, one of the major centres of conflict was the Kumyk village of Bashly.

Despite the devastation brought by the Imperial Army for their attempts to rise against Russia, the Kumyk plains were also exposed to plundering forays from the neighboring tribes. For instance, in 1830, one Chechen leader, Avko, gathered forces in a call to allegedly join the troops of the leader of the Caucasian resistance, Gazi-Muhammad, but at the last moment declared the true reason "to use the opportunity to attack the city of Endirey and plunder Kumyks' cattle". However, the troops disbanded in disappointment. Gazi-Muhammad himself tried to make Kumyks resettle higher in the mountains from the plains and join his resistance by destroying Kumyk settlements, as stated in the Russian military archives:

Kazi-mulla, trying to hold Kumyks close, came up with a strange trick: destroying their auls [settlements] in order to force them to resettle in the mountains by depriving of living spaces. On the 24th of July he, in front of our troops, made the first experiment on Endirey village and burned down the third of it. Prince [Knyaz] Bekovich [Russian officer] at that time was burning Kumyks' bread at the slopes of the mountains...

During the Caucasian War, Kumyks found themselves between a rock and a hard place, not always supported by the insurgents on one hand, and being a target of retaliation from Russians on the other. The same archives also described that:

...Kazi-mulla... used all the means to push away from us the population of the Small Chechnya and Kachkalik ridge, which however remained loyal to us only by their appearance, and namely because they didn't want to get between two fires as Kumyks did.

Kumyks during the War gave the Caucasus many common heroes. Imam of Dagestan and Chechnya Shamil was of Kumyk descent, as well as his companion and the second pretender to the Imam's position Tashaw-Hadji. Also, Kumyks were the leaders of the earlier Dagestani revolts, such as Soltan Ahmed-Khan of the Avars, and Umalat-bek of Boynak (the heir of the Tarki throne), companion of the imam Gazi-Muhammad Razibek of Kazanish, trusted companion of the Imam Shamil — Idris of Endirey.

== Genetics ==
According to genetic studies in 2023, the following haplogroups are found to predominate among Kumyks:

- J1 (36%)
- R1b (19%)
- J2 (13%)
- G2 (11%)
- R1a (5%)
- C2 (4%)

== Colonization by Russia ==
The tsarist and Soviet government pursued a policy of settling the Kumyk lands with other peoples from the end of the 18th century and the beginning of the 19th century.

Back in 1811, Tormasov is known to order "to incline the Chechens to retire from the mountains to the plane." Another governor of the Caucasus, Vorontsov, pursued the same policy of "colonizing" the possessions of the Kumyks, also by Chechens, arguing that "the Kumyks have no right to those lands." Kumyk possessions also included such areas as Kachkalyk and Aukh, gradually settled by Chechens, and the region of Salatavia.

In the late 1870s, the entire southern part of the Khasavyurt district, from Gerzel-aul to Endirey, was populated by Chechens, sometimes by force, by the decree of Russia. From 1870 to 1877, the number of Chechens in the region increased from 5,912 Aukh to 14,000 Chechens and continued to rise to 18,128 in 1897. The possessions of the Kumyks in the Terek-Sunzha interfluve were lost, some of them along with the Kumyk population are now part of Chechnya.

In the 1850s, the Kumyk princes of the Kumyk district of the Terek region voluntarily gave up half of their lands in favor of the Kumyk people, however, documents confirming the relevant rights were issued only to the princes and uzdens, and the rights of the rest of the population were not documented. Local authorities, using various pretexts, moved newcomers to Kumyk lands. This policy of neglecting the right of the Kumyk population was recorded as continuing in 1907.

=== Dissolution of Shamkhalate and the Kumyk Okrug ===
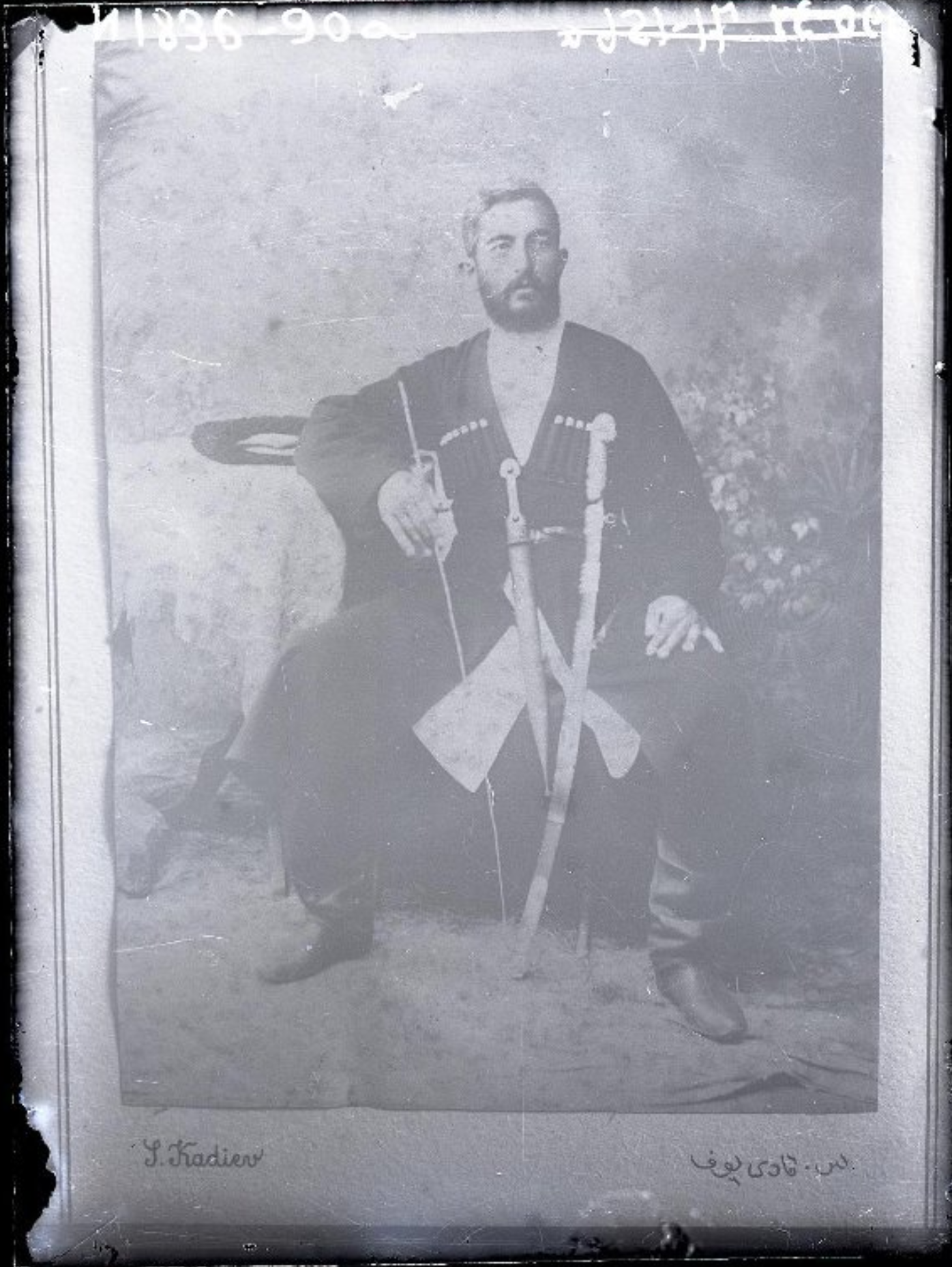
Last Shamkhal Shamsuddin khan of Tarki

When the Caucasian War ended on 30 December 1869, the Kumyk district of the Terek oblast (Northern Kumykia) was dissolved and renamed as Khasavyurt okrug.

According to the Brockhaus and Efron Encyclopedic Dictionary, issued at the turn of the 19 - 20th centuries, there were 32,087 thousand Kumyks in Dagestan (which at that time did not comprised the Northern Kumykia). According to an 1891 survey, 108,800 Kumyks lived in the Dagestan and Terek Oblasts of the Russian Empire.

Somewhat earlier, in 1867 the Tarki Shamkhalate was abolished by the Russian authorities, which might be considered as the end of the Kumyk statehood.

=== 1916 revolt, Russian Revolution, Soviet and modern times ===
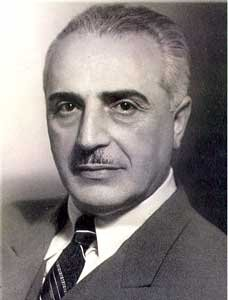
Haidar Bammate, one of the founders of the North Caucasian Republic

In mid-July 1916 (late July 1916 N.S.), Kumyk rebels rose up against Russian authorities in Aksay. The cause of the uprising laid in the Kumyk's unwillingness to be conscripted into the Russian Imperial Army. The uprising ended on 24 July (6 August N.S.), when the draft was cancelled.

During the establishment of the Soviet Union, Kumyk political elite were an active part in the creation of the Mountainous Republic of the Northern Caucasus. Haydar Bammate was the Minister of Foreign Affairs and one of the ideologists of the state, Prince Rashitkhan Kaplan was the Minister of Internal Affairs, one of the major military leaders was prince Nuh-bek Tarkovskiy, and Zubair Temirhanov was the speaker of the Alliance Council ("Mejlis" - Senate) of the Republic.

In 1926 the Soviet Population Census stated that there were 94 549 Kumyks in the Russian Empire, indicating demographic crisis, compared to the 1891 data.

=== Demographics ===
In 1795, the Russian Empire's estimates give a number of 100 thousand people in the lands of Shamkhal (including other than Kumyks).

In 1833, rough estimations showed around 88 thousand Kumyks within the areas of influence of the Russian Empire. In 1866, after the end of the Caucasian War, some estimations showed around 78 thousand. In 1886, 1891 and 1897 accordingly — 88, 108, 83 thousand, in 1916 — 98 thousand.

The Soviet census of 1926 showed 88 thousand. Thus, there are no indications of any growth almost in a century, due to wars, emigration from Russian-conquered territories and disease.

Due to the continuous resettlement policies by the Russian Empire, then the Soviet government, and continuing today in the modern Republic of Dagestan of the Russian Federation, during the 19th through 21st century the native territories of Kumyks have been dramatically reduced; Kumyks became a minority in their own lands.

== Ethnocide by Soviet Union ==
=== Deportation ===
By the decree of Stalin's government, on the 12 of April 1944 the Kumyk population of historical Kumyk capital Tarki and adjacent villages were entirely deported to the Central Asian SSRs (Chechens, Karachays, Balkars and Crimean Tatars also were deported). The reason was stated as "freeing the area for the agricultural needs" of mountain peoples being resettled in the region. The deportation, despite the historical record in Russian law, is still not acknowledged by the Russian government. As a result of this event, the local population lost for years their ancient capital of Tarki, which led to the permanent destruction of most of the Kumyk cultural heritage.

=== Reasoning for ethnocide ===
As UNPO describes the membership of Kumyks as follows:

Under Soviet occupation, a policy of ethnocide was implemented and leaders of the Kumyk movements were repressed, persecuted and killed. The introduction of mono-culture agriculture, the exploitation of the soil and deforestation led to an economic and ecological crisis in the area. In addition, the Kumyk people were unable to preserve their culture, as, for example, they were denied the right to write their language in the traditional Arabic script or teach their language in schools.
During their UNPO membership, the Kumyk people advocated for an administrative reform in the Republic of Dagestan and seek self-determination in the form of national autonomy. They also strived to preserve their traditional way of life, culture and customs.

In 1925, Russian scholar Nikolay Trubetskoy expressed opinions, which may explain the given policy of Russia with regard to Kumyks:

Kumyk is the "international" language of almost the entire North Caucasus (from the Caspian Sea to Kabarda inclusive), Azerbaijani dominates in most of the Transcaucasia (except the Black Sea coast) and, in addition, in Turkish Armenia, Kurdistan and Northern Persia. Both of these languages are Turkic. It must be held in mind that with the intensification of economic life, the use of "international" languages acquires such importance that it displaces native languages: many auls of the southern districts of Dagestan have already become completely "Azerbaijanified". It is hardly in Russia's interests to allow such a Turkification of Dagestan. After all, if the whole of Dagestan becomes Turkic, then there will be a continuous mass of Turks from Kazan to Anatolia and Northern Persia, which will create the most favorable conditions for the development of Pan-Turan ideas with a separatist, Russophobic bias. Dagestan should be used as a natural barrier to the Turkification of this part of Eurasia.

Communist leader of Dagestan, who conducted the deportation of Kumyks, reasoned non-ethnical administrative bordering of Dagestan in this way:

"Firstly, it [meaning splitting Dagestan by non-ethnic principle] was necessary to do this for economic reasons. If it were decided to grant national autonomy to at least the main peoples of Dagestan (Avars, Dargins, Kumyks, Lezgins, Laks, Tabasarans), then the main wealth of Dagestan (arable land, pastures) would go to the Kumyks, because they were located on their territory... Secondly, political and ethnic considerations were taken into account. So, the Avars in the entire history of their existence did not have a unified state entity..."

== Language ==
Kumyks speak the Kumyk language, which is a part of the Kipchak-Cuman subfamily of the Kipchak family of the Turkic languages. It is a direct descendant of the Khazar languages and in addition contains words from the Bulghar and Oghuz substratum.

Nikolay Baskakov, based on a famous 12th century scripture named Codex Cimanicus, included modern Kumyk, Karachai-Balkar, Crimean Tatar, Karaim, and the language of Mamluk Kipchaks in the Cuman-Kipchak languages. Alexander Samoylovich also considered Cuman-Kipchak close to Kumyk and Karachai-Balkar.

Kumyk had been a lingua-franca of a great part of the Northern Caucasus, from Dagestan to Kabarda, until the 1930s.

In 1848, a professor of the "Caucasian Tatars" (Kumyks) Timofey Makarov published a grammar of Kumyk, the first ever grammar written in Russian for a language spoken in the North Caucasus.

From the peoples speaking Tatar language I liked the most Kumyks, as for their language's distinction and precision, so for their closeness to the European civilization, but most importantly, I take in account that they live on the Left Flank of the Caucasian Front, where we're conducting military actions, and where all the peoples, apart from their own language, speak also Kumyk.

Kumyk was an official language of communication between the Northeastern Caucasian nations and the Russian administration.

Amongst the dialects of the Kumyk there are Kaitag, Terek (Güçük-yurt and Braguny), Buynaksk (Temir-Khan-Shura) and Xasavyurt. The latter two became basis for the literary language.

Kumyk is the oldest script literary language of Dagestan. During the 20th century, the writing system of the language was changed twice: during Soviet times in 1929 traditional Arabic script (called ajam) was substituted by the Latin script, and then in 1938 by Cyrillic script.

The closest languages to Kumyk are the Karachai-Balkar, Crimean Tatar, and Karaim languages.

More than 90% of Kumyks in Russia, according to the 2010 census, also speak Russian, and those in Turkey and the Levant (Sham) speak Turkish and Arabic.

== In Russian and European classical literature ==
German poet Paul Fleming, travelling together with the Holstein embassy through Kumyk lands in 1633 and 1636, had dedicated to Kumykia and its towns a few verses.

The Kumyk language was a subject of studies for Russian classical authors such as Leo Tolstoy and Mikhail Lermontov, both of whom served with the Imperial Russian Army in the Caucasus. The language is present in such works of Tolstoy as The Raid, Cossacks, Hadji Murat, and Lermontov's A Hero of Our Time.

Tolstoy described Kumyk village of Khamamatyurt in his Hunting in the Caucasus.

Alexander Bestuzhev also featured the Kumyk language and Kumykia in his works "Molla-nur" and "Ammalat-bek", and described in some details Russian military raids on Kumyk settlements in his Letters from Dagestan.

Alexandre Dumas also described some areas of Kumykia and the time when he was a guest of a Kumyk prince Ali Qazanalp.

== Notable Kumyks ==
- Nassourdine Imavov — mixed martial artist of Kumyk origin who competes in the UFC.
- Muhammad Mokaev — Kumyk mixed martial artist, former UFC fighter and IMMAF world champion.
- Muhammad Awabi Aktashi — Kumyk historian and scholar, best known as the author of a major Turkic version of the Derbend-nâme.
- Sultan-Agha Khanum — Safavid consort of Tahmasp I and a member of the Shamkhal ruling family of Tarki.
- Chopan I — 16th-century Kumyk ruler and Shamkhal of Tarki.
- Mehdi II Tarkovsky — Shamkhal of Tarki, Khan of Derbent and Lieutenant General of the Imperial Russian Army.
- Umalat-bek Buynaksky — Kumyk military and political leader during the Caucasian War.
- Nuh-bey Tarkovsky — Kumyk prince, military commander and Minister of War of the Mountainous Republic of the Northern Caucasus.
- Haidar Bammate — Kumyk politician, diplomat and Foreign Minister of the Mountainous Republic of the Northern Caucasus.
- Abusupyan Akayev — Kumyk educator, Arabist scholar, poet and prominent figure of the Jadid movement in Dagestan.
- Nukhay Batyrmurzaev — Kumyk writer and educator, regarded as one of the founders of modern Kumyk prose.
- Zainalabid Batyrmurzaev — Kumyk poet, publicist and revolutionary figure.
- Devlet-Mirza Shikhaliyev — Kumyk ethnographer and author of a major 19th-century account of Kumyk society.
- Shihammat Kadi of Erpeli — Kumyk poet, writer, translator, publisher and religious scholar.
- Manay Alibekov — Kumyk poet, ethnographer and public educator.
- Muzhayedin Khangishiev — Kumyk aircraft designer and recipient of the USSR State Prize.
- Rustam Khabilov — Kumyk mixed martial artist, former UFC fighter and Combat Sambo world champion.
- Muslim Salikhov — Kumyk mixed martial artist and multiple-time Wushu Sanda world champion who has competed in the UFC.
- Abus Magomedov — German mixed martial artist of Kumyk origin who competes in the UFC.

== See also ==
- Russian-Kumyk Wars
- List of more Kumyk people
