= Endirey =

Village in Khasavyurtovsky District, Russia

Endirey Эндирей
- Selo

Other transcription(s)
  - Kumyk: Endirey, Эндирей
- Interactive map of Endirey
- Location of Endirey Endirey (European Russia) Endirey (Russia)
- Coordinates: 43°10′50″N 46°39′19″E
- Country: Russia
- Federal subject: Dagestan
- Elevation: 40 m (130 ft)

Population
  - Estimate (2025): 9,573 )
- Time zone: UTC+3 (MSK)
- Postal code: 368040
- OKTMO ID: 82654409101

Endirey (Russian: Эндирей; OKATO: 82254815001) is a village (selo) in the Khasavyurt District of the Republic of Dagestan in Russia. It is the center of the Endireyskoe Rural Settlement and has a population of 7,863 (2015). Endirey is an important historical center of the Kumyks.

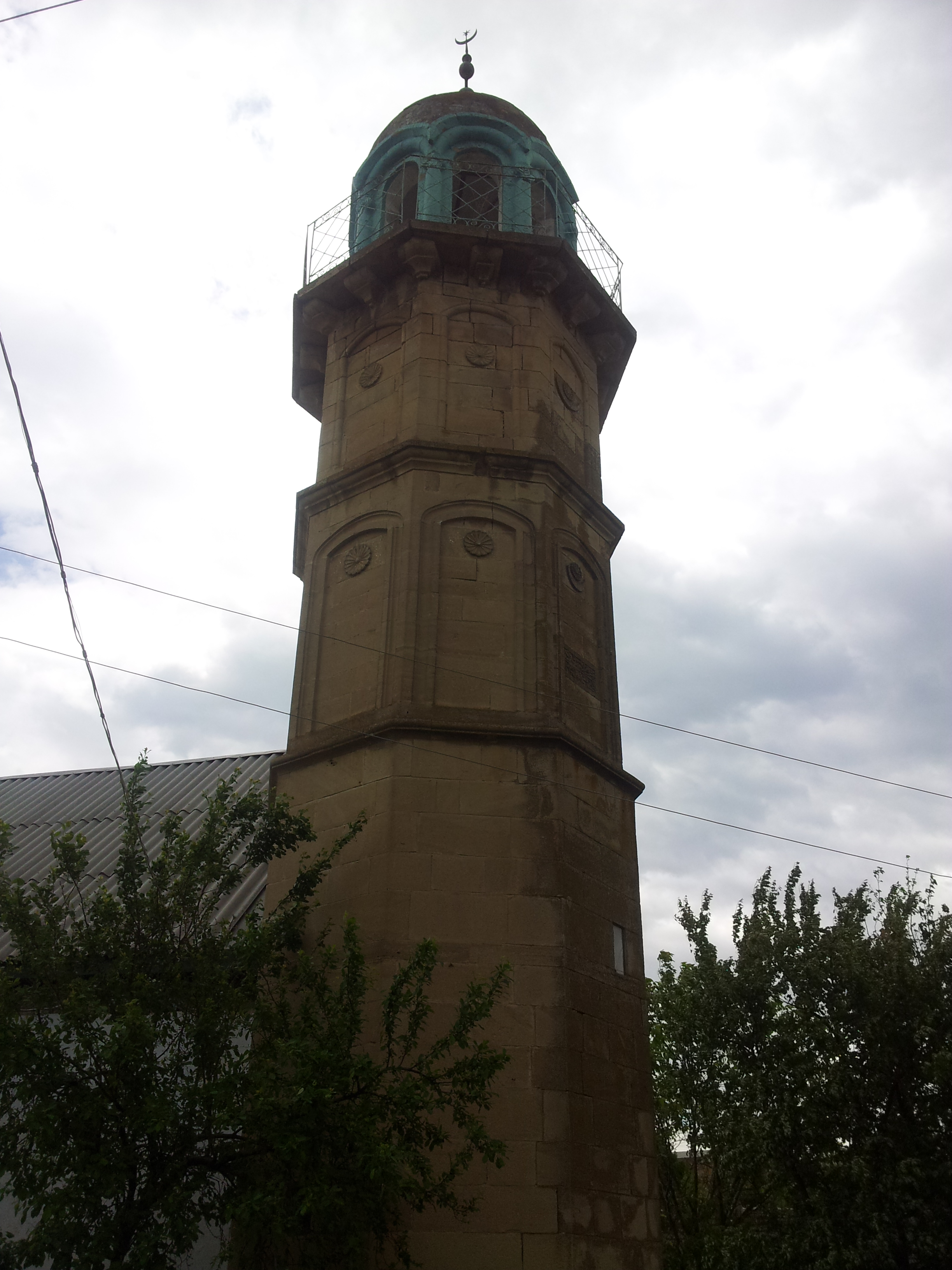
Mosque in Endirey

Its current head is Salavatov Rustam Abdulvagidovich.

== Name ==
Endirey is an ancient original Kumyk name. It was adopted by Daghestan in 1991, replacing the Soviet name Andreyaul (Андрейаул). Under Imperial Russia, its name had been Andreyevo (Андреево, Andreevo) after an early Cossack leader who supposedly settled there, a Russian source quotes many alleged explanations. Former spellings include Enderi, Enderee, Indiri and al-Indiri, Andreeva, and Andreewa. It has also been known as Andreevskii Awul.

== Location ==
Endirey lies at the foot of Mount Tshumlu on the Aktash River near Khasavyurt, just north of the Caucasus and just east of the Chechen border. It lies about 72 kilometers (45 mi) south of Kizliar and has a mean elevation of 40 meters (130 ft).

== History ==
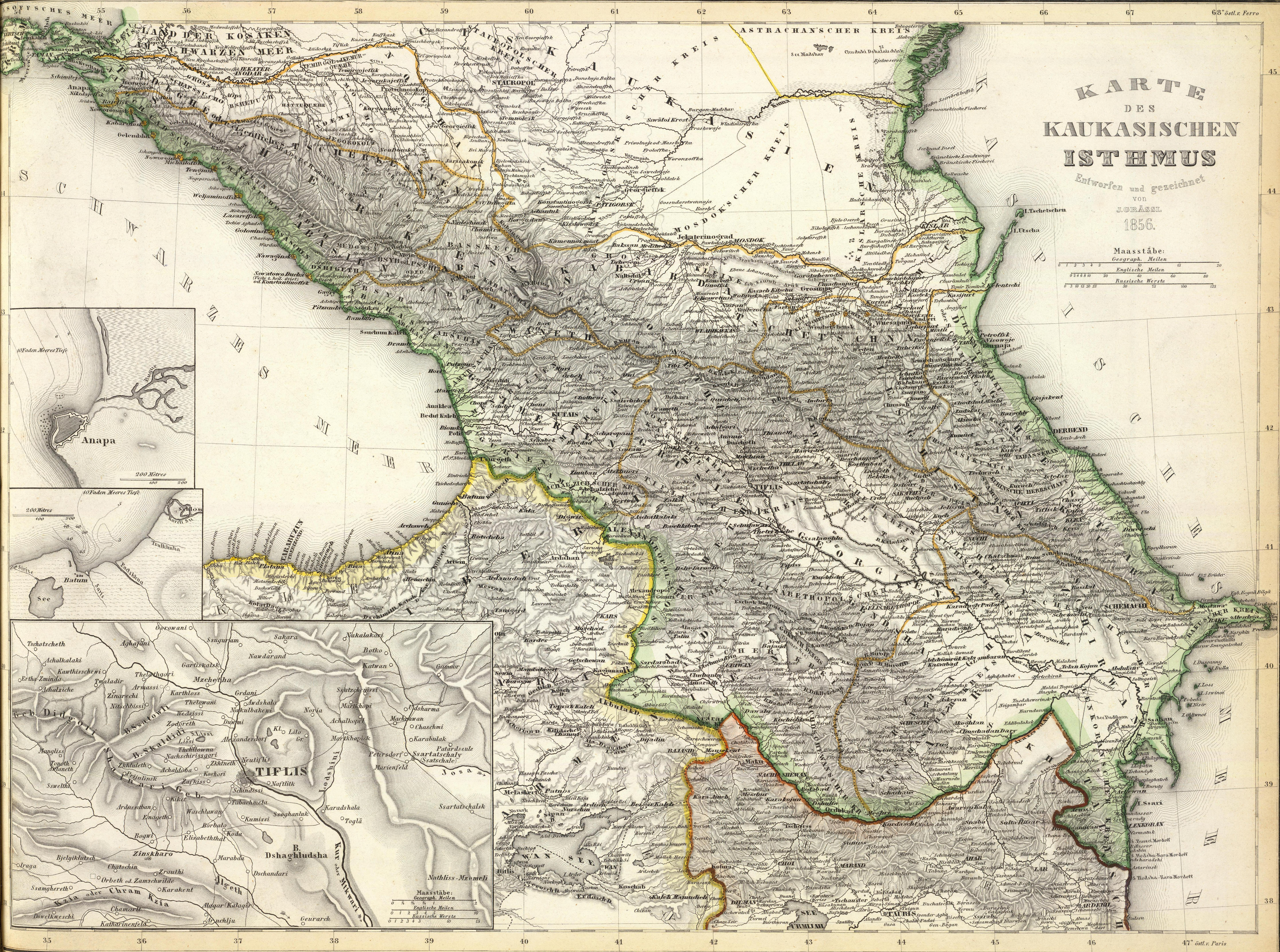
An 1856 German map of the Russian Caucasus, including "Enderi" and "Wnesapnaja".

The area preserves the ruins of a fortress destroyed by Tamerlane during the Tokhtamysh–Timur war.

The early history Endirey is uncertain. During the Safavid period (1501–1736), the small Kumyk's kingdom of Endirey formed somewhat of a "buffer state" towards the north. Feodor I dispatched Prince Grigori Zasekin against the local shamkhal in 1591. His force of 5000 Russian musketeers and 10,000 Cherkesses captured and razed Andreyevo the next year, wounding the shamkhal. Relations with the nearby Circassians were, however, generally friendly prior to the Cossacks' submission to Peter the Great in 1712, after which raiding and invasions became more common. In a belated response to the 1707 burning of the Russian fort at Tarki, Peter the Great dispatched a unit of cavalry to occupy Endirey in 1722 as part of his Persian campaign. The force suffered a serious repulse and the area was left alone for several decades.

Endirey had a large slave trade to the Ottoman Empire and became the principal city of the Kumyks.

General Yermolov constructed a major fort at Vnezapnaya in 1820, placing it across the Aktash from Endirey at the mouth of the Koysu. This fort was used to suppress the Endirey slave fair and to support the local shamkhal against the Kumyk nobility. It supported Russian colonization of the area: the revolts the program provoked (as Imam Shamil's in the 1840s and Haji Mohammed's in 1877) were an expected consequence and were seen as permitting still greater relocation and resettlement. The fort also formed the staging point for the 1839 phase of the Caucasian War. General Grabbe's siege of Akhoulgo formed part of this campaign. The town and fort were assaulted by Shamil in September 1843 but the Russian commander Colonel Kozlovsky was able to withstand the attack.

In the later 19th century, it had a population of around 12,000 people comprising about 3000 households. The district around it included fertile agricultural valleys but also sandy desert, mineral springs, and upwellings of naphtha. Despite continuing as a Kumyk protectorate, it formed part of the Russian Empire's district of the Caucasus.

== Demographics ==
The area around Endirey is currently majority Sunni Muslim Kumyks - 6,025 (93,1 %).

== See also ==
- Other Andreyevos
- List of Turkish exonyms
