= Bashkir rebellion =

Bashkir rebellion (Bashkir: Başqurt ixtilalı) may refer to:

- Bashkir rebellion of 1662–1664
- Bashkir rebellion of 1681–1684
- Bashkir rebellion of 1704–1711
- Bashkir rebellion of 1735–1740
