= Kisyakbika Bayryasova =

Bashkir woman (1679–1739)

- Кисәнбикә Байрасова
- Born: Киҫәнбикә Байрасова; 1679
- Died: 30 April 1739 (aged 59–60); Yekaterinburg, Russian Empire
- Cause of death: death sentence

Kisyakbika Bayryasova (Bashkir: Киҫәнбикә Байрасова, 1679 – 30 April 1739) was a forcibly-baptized Muslim woman, sentenced to be burned for returning to Islam.

== Political situation in the province ==
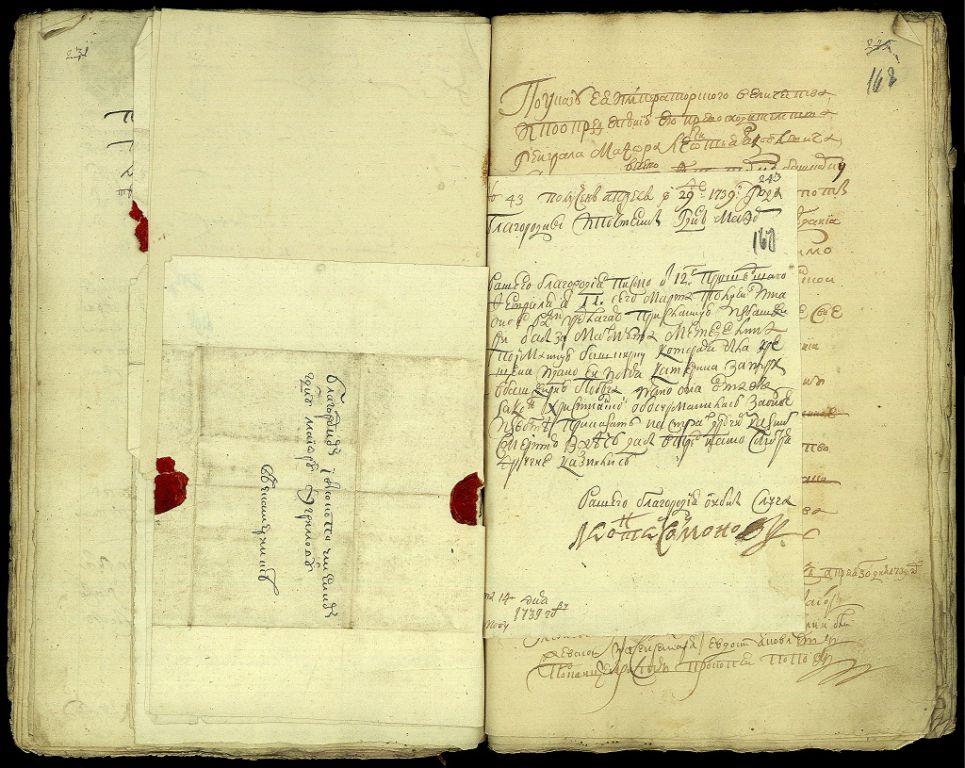
Photo from the archive

Kysyabika Bayryasova was born in 1679 in the Duvanskoy volost of the Siberian road in Russia. At the beginning of the 18th century, the so-called "mountain power" was created in the Urals. Vasily Tatishchev, known as the founder of the city of Yekaterinburg and the author of the book "The History of Russia" was the head of the Industrial Office. At that time, the active development of new deposits began, and new plants and mines were built in the province. The local population of the Bashkirs feared that they would lose their patrimonial rights to lands obtained under the conditions of accession to Russia, and sought to protect their cultural, religious and domestic traditions. The discontent of the people would cause the Bashkir rebellion of 1735–1740. The authorities responded with punitive campaigns. Residents of insurgent villages were killed, sold into slavery, forcibly baptized. Bayryasova was captured and brought to Yekaterinburg, where she was given as a serf to writer and translator Kiriak Kondratovich. She was baptized, and after her baptism she was named Katerina.

Like the rest of the slaves, Kisyakbika dreamed of freedom. On September 18, 1737, she made her first escape with another slave. The old woman was caught and whipped. On September 26 of the same year Kisyakbika made her second escape from Ekaterinburg with the secretary of the manager of the Industrial Office. Kisyakbika was caught and this time was carved with a whip.

Meanwhile, on April 20, 1738, the execution of Toigilda Zhulyakov took place. He was also forcibly baptized, but he returned to Islam. All the Bashkirs of Yekaterinburg and its environs were taken to the place of Toigilda burning. Toyhildy Zhilyakov was burned at the stake in front of his children. But Kisiakbika did not stop before the fear of being burnt. In September 1738, she ran away for the third time.

On February 8, 1739, the Industrial Office decided to burn Kisyabika Bayrasova on stake for returning to Islam and for three escapes.

A month later Kisyabika Bayrasova was executed on the central square of Yekaterinburg.

== In art ==
The Bashkir writer M. S. Burakaeva wrote the story "Kisyakbika's Tale (Сказ Кисякбике)". Mikhail Bashkirov wrote a play based on the story. The Sterlitamak Bashkir Drama Theater staged this play. On the stage of the National Youth Theatre. Mustai Karim, with great success, the premiere of “The Tale of Kisyakbik (Bashkir: Киҫәкбикә. Риүәйәт).

After the sensational premiere, the performance was removed from the show. According to theater artists, the decree to cancel the production comes from the Minister of Culture.

== See also ==
- Apostasy in Christianity
