= The Russian-Bashkir Friendship Monument =

Monument in Bashkortostan, Russia

Coordinates: 54.7117°N 55.9633°E

- (Bashkir: Урыҫ һәм башҡорт халыҡтар Дуҫлығы Монументы (Uryth ha’m bashqort halyqtar Dusslyg’y Monumenty)
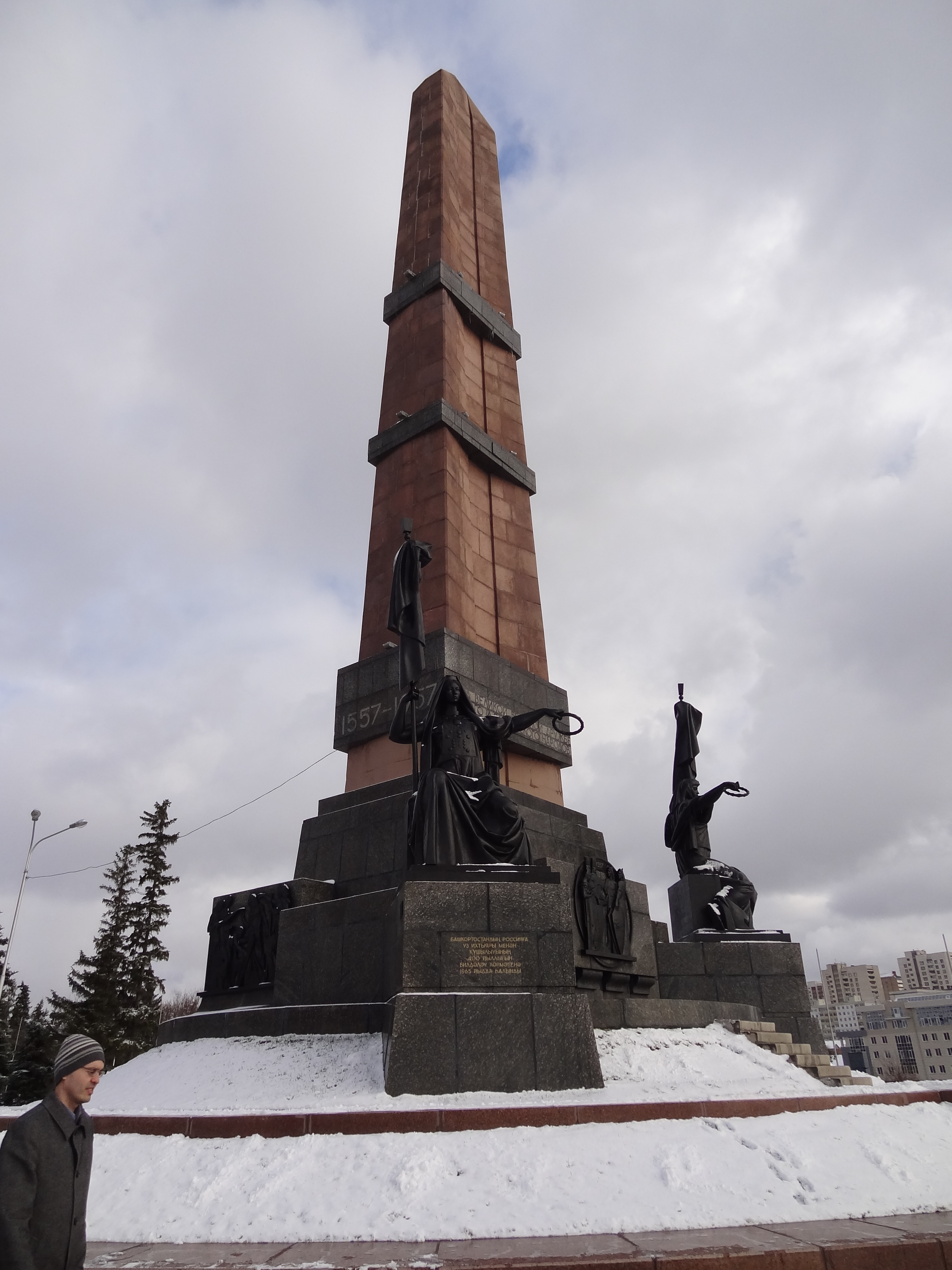
- Russia-Bashkir Monument of Friendship in summer, 2011
- Interactive map of The Russian-Bashkir Friendship Monument
- Location: Ufa, Bashkortostan
- Designer: Mikhail Baburin; Galina Levitczkaya
- Opening date: 1965
- Dedicated to: accession of Bashkortostan in Russia.

The Russian-Bashkir Friendship Monument (Bashkir: Урыҫ һәм башҡорт халыҡтар Дуҫлығы Монументы, Uryss ha’m bashqort halyqtar Dusslyg’y Monumenty) is a monument in the city of Ufa, dedicated to the 400th anniversary of the accession of Bashkortostan in Russia, located on a hill above the Belaya River (Ağizel in Bashkir).

Construction of the statue began in 1957 in honor of the 400th anniversary of Bashkortostan's entry into the Russian Empire. The statue opened to the public on 7 August 1965 with an official ceremony.

At the base of the monument are bronze sculptures of two women who sit on either side of the stela, half turned towards each other. The sculptures are allegories of Russia and Bashkortostan and both hold laurel wreaths as a symbol of peace. The monument is inscribed with the years "1557 - 1957" and the following in Russian and Bashkir:

СЛАВА ВЕЛИКОЙ БРАТСКОЙ ДРУЖБЕ РУССКОГО И БАШКИРСКОГО НАРОДОВ
РУС ҺӘМ БАШҠОРТ ХАЛЫҠТАРЫНЫҢ БӨЙӨК ТУҒАНЛЫҠ ДУҪЛЫҒЫНА ДАН
(English: GLORY TO THE GREAT BROTHERLY FRIENDSHIP OF THE RUSSIAN AND BASHKIR PEOPLES)

== History ==
The 400th anniversary of Bashkiria's accession into the Russian Empire was celebrated in 1957. On June 14, a marble marker was laid on the site with the inscription:

«There will be erected a monument in memory of the 400th anniversary of Bashkiria's voluntary accession to the Russian State»

The design of the monument, however, began 4 years later, and the monument was not opened until August 7, 1965.

== Gallery ==
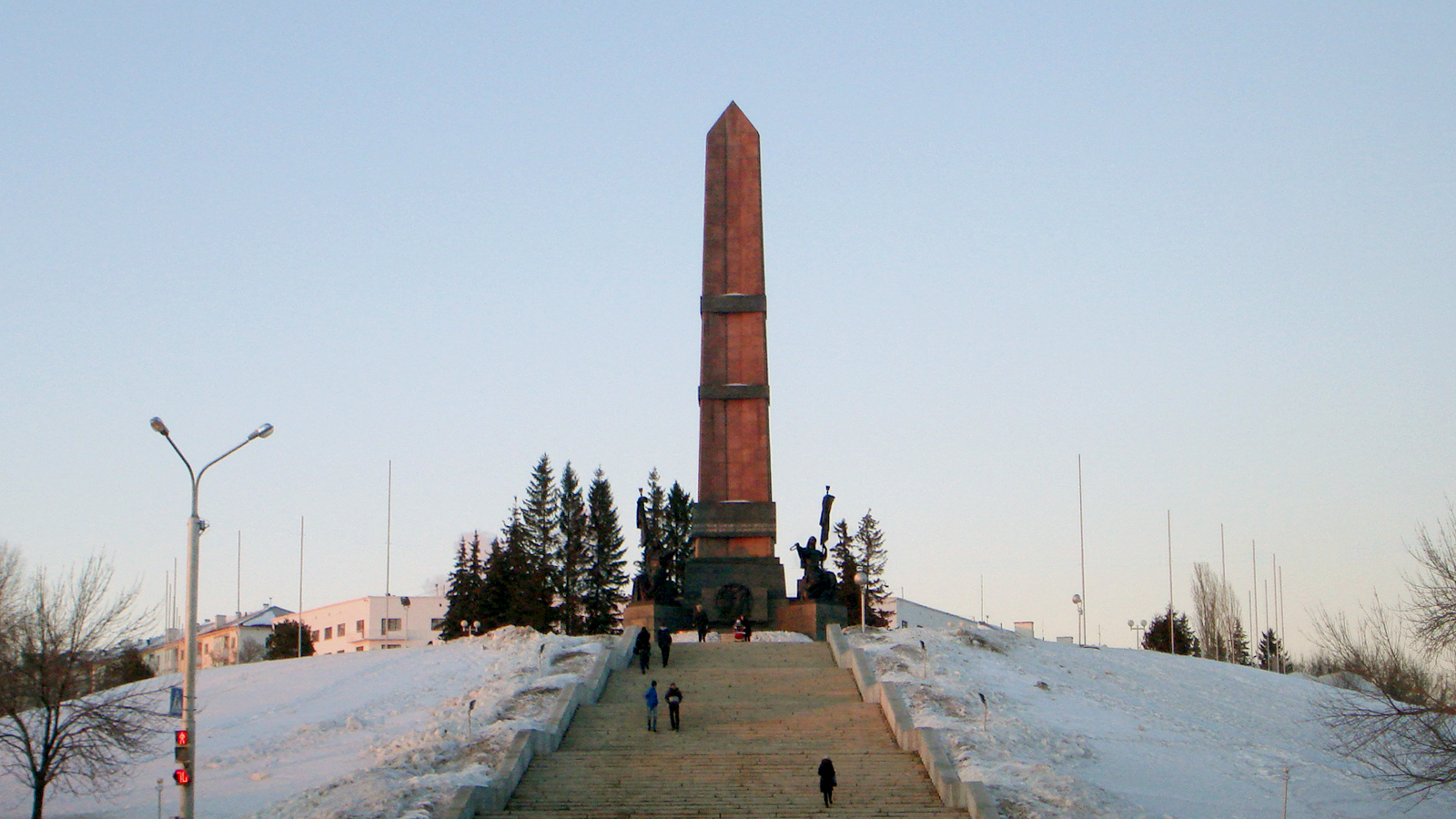
The Russian-Bashkir Friendship Monument in winter, 2011

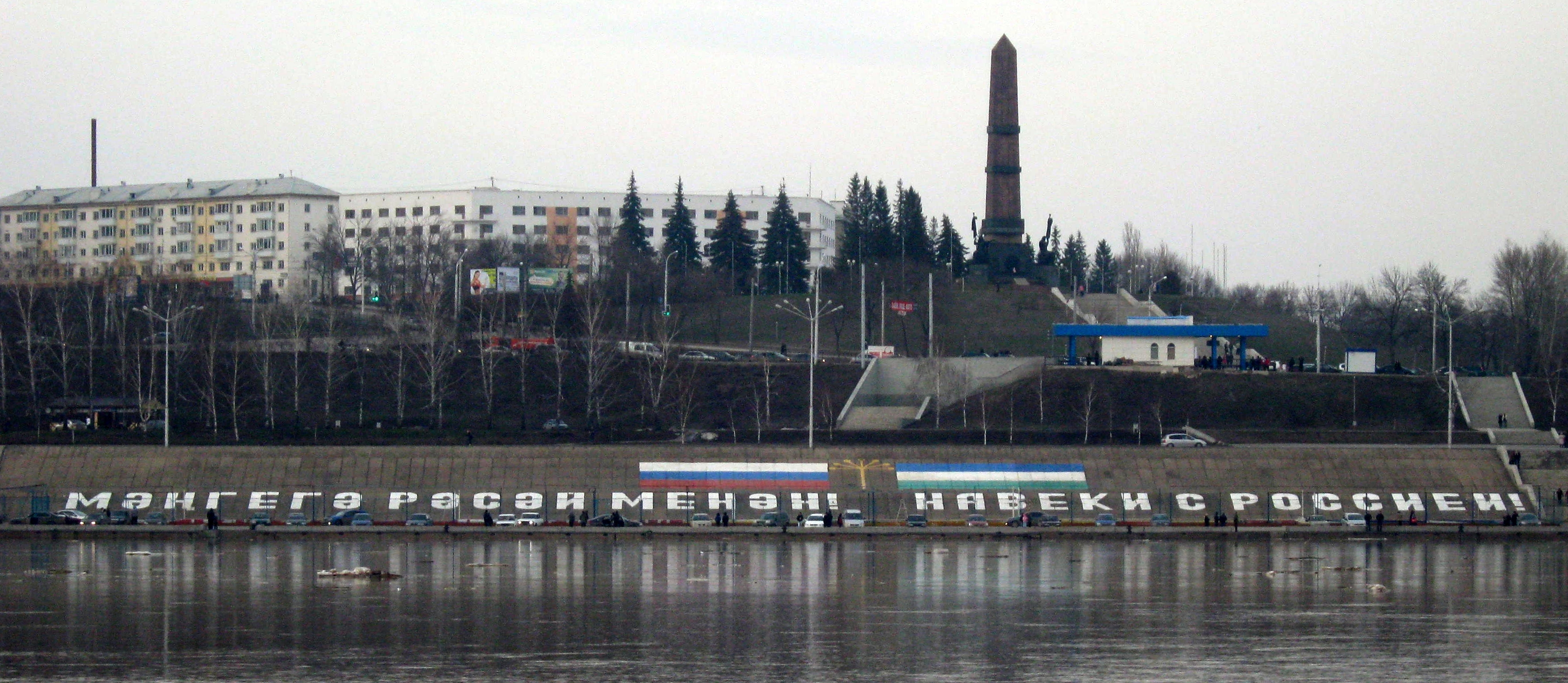
View from Belaya River

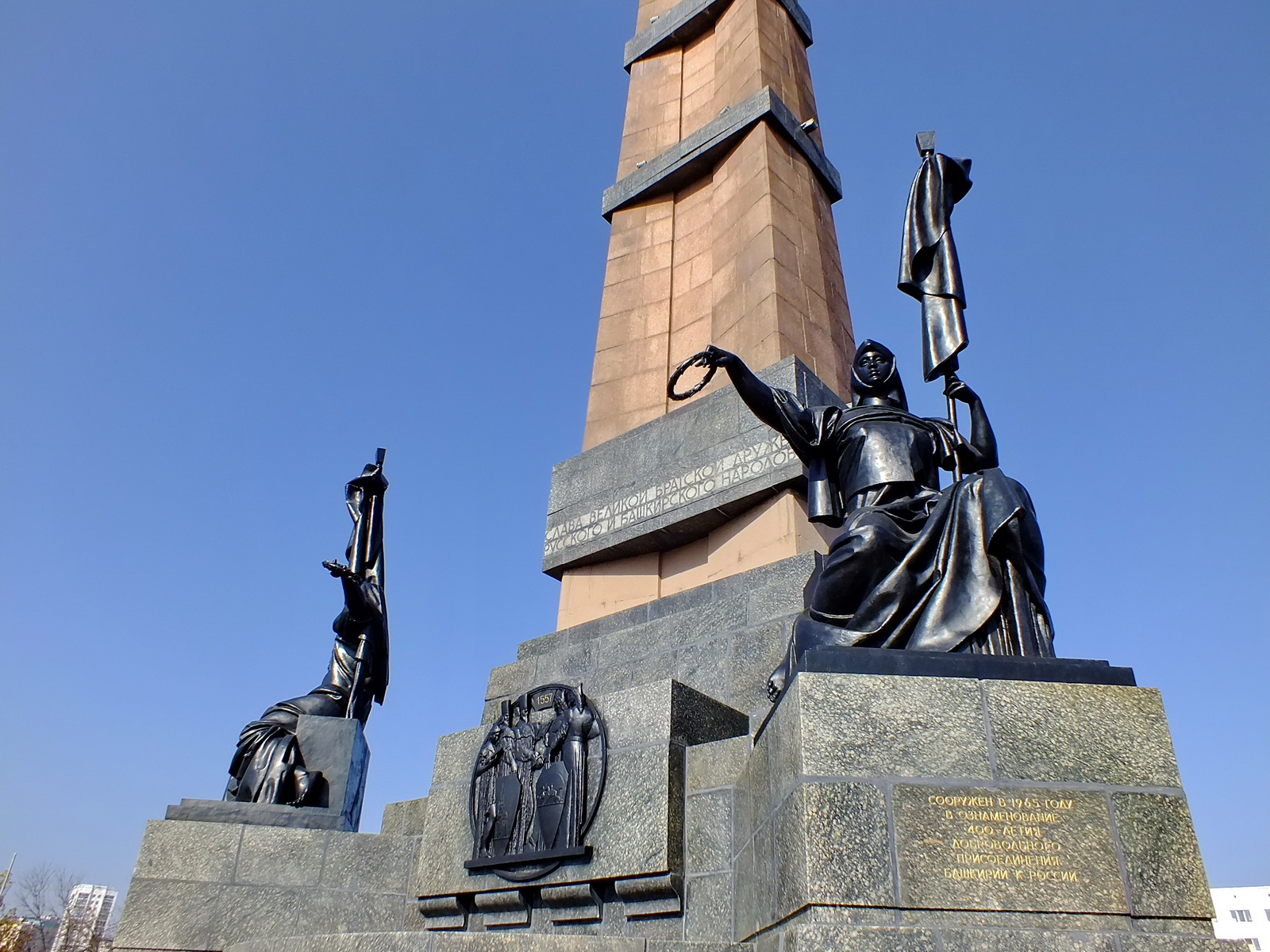

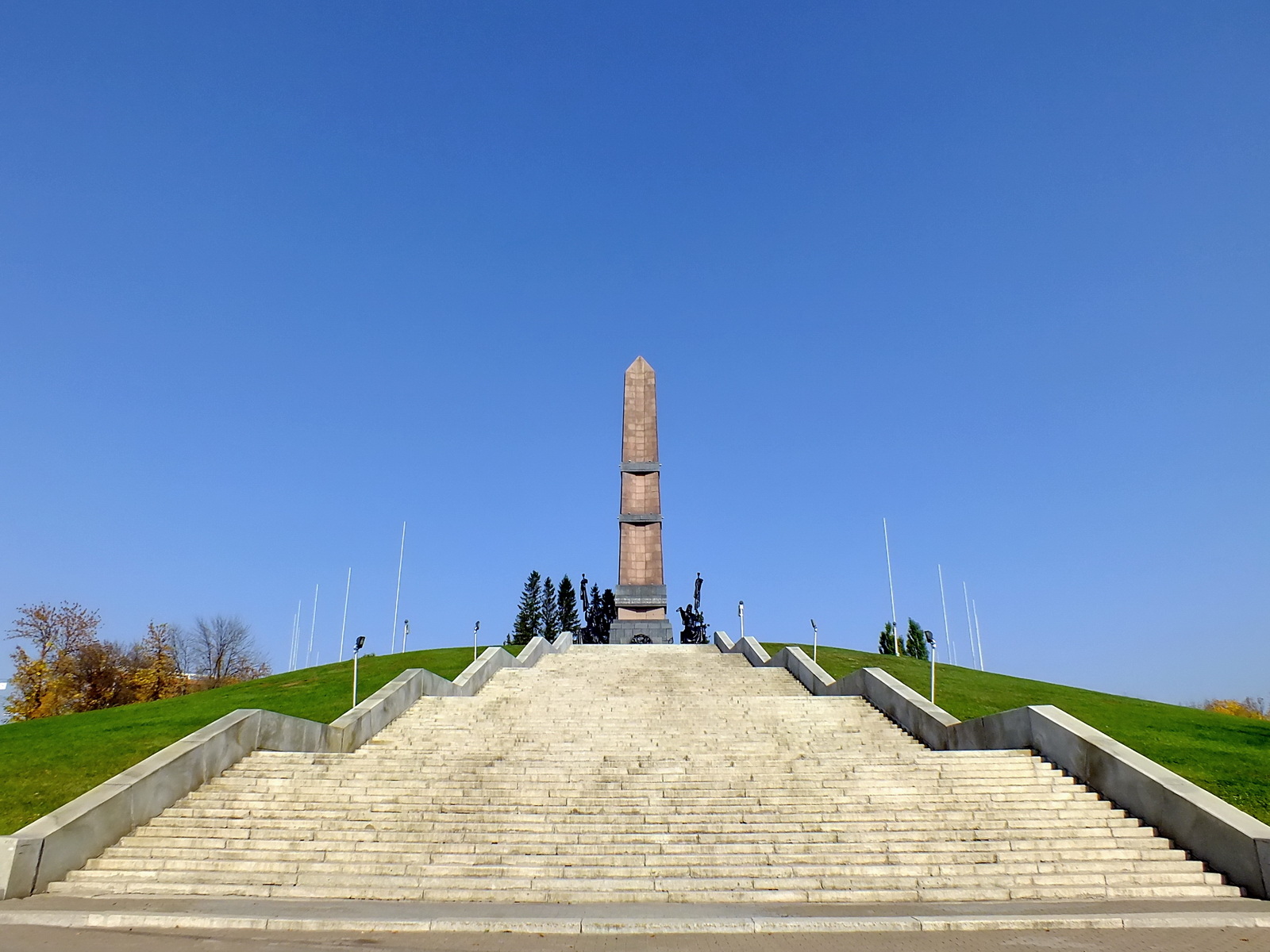

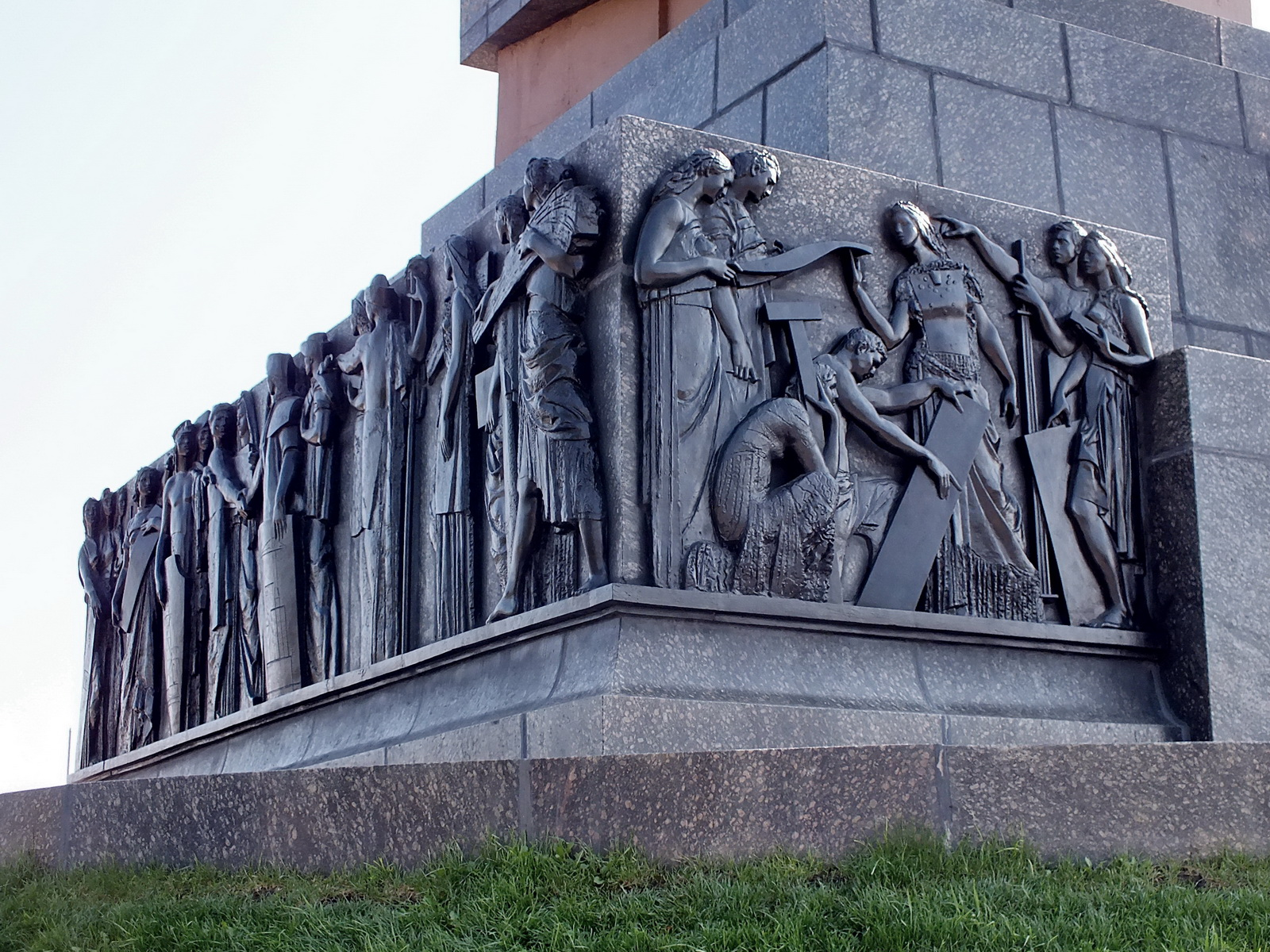
