= Bashkir rebellion of 1662–1664 =

Rebellion in the Tsardom of Russia

Bashkir Rebellion of 1662–1664
Date	Summer 1662 – Autumn 1664
Location	Mainly Bashkortostan, Tsardom of Russia
Result	Bashkir political victory: Russian government forced to accept Bashkir demands

Belligerents
Bashkir rebels	Russia

Commanders and leaders
Gaura Akbulatov; Ulekeya Krivoy; Ishmukhammed; Konkas Davletbaev; Uraslanbek Bakkin †; Sarah Mergen	Alexis I Fyodor Volkonsky; A. M. Volkonsky

Strength
Unknown	Unknown

Casualties and losses
Unknown	Unknown

The Bashkir rebellion was one of the first major insurrection of the Bashkirs in the second half of the 17th century.

== Causes of rebellion ==
Since the mid-16th century, the Bashkirs were vassals of the Tsardom of Russia. The main reason for the rebellion was the fear of losing patrimonial rights to lands received under the terms of accession to Russia as a result of the Russian expansion. The Bashkirs were also unhappy with the arbitrariness of the Ufa governor and complained about increasing taxes and abuse by officials during collections.

== Place of the uprising ==
Distribution of the uprising in the territory of the middle reaches of the river Iset, Miass in the east to the middle reaches of the Kama River in the west, from the river Yaik (now the Urals) in the south to the river Chusovoi in the north.

== Fighting ==
The uprising began in the summer of 1662 in the Urals. Bashkirs led by Sarah Mergena, Uraslanbek Bakkin and other leaders attacked Kataysky jail, Dalmatia Nev'yansky, monasteries Aramilsky, Irbitskoi, Belosludskuyu, Murzinskoe and other Settlements and managed to capture some of them. To fight the rebels, the royal government sent a large military force. Near the Lake Irtyash they held a major battle. Another area of struggle was North Bashkortostan, where the rebels took the town of Kungur, Stepanovski jail, Vozdvizhenski and destroyed Russian villages, monasteries and towns along the river Sylva. The Uprising spread as the Nogai and Kazan Darugha road. The rebels, led by Gaura Akbulatov and Ulekeya Krivoy besieged the city of Ufa, Menzelinsk and other strongholds, villages and countryside. Against the Nogai and Kazan, the Bashkir government sent a large force led by Kazan warlord Prince Fyodor Volkonsky . Arriving in the city of Ufa, he sent death squads against the insurgents, and at the same time appealed to the Bashkirs to cease fighting. In autumn 1662 the majority of the Bashkirs agreed to the talks, which ended without result.

In the spring of 1663, the renewed uprising spread throughout the territory of Badzhgard. After deciding to continue the fight, the rebels tried to find allies. The Bashkir Siberian Darugha strengthen old ties with non-Russian peoples of the Trans-Urals. In addition, they established contact with the prince Kuciuk, great-grandson of Kuchum as well. At the time of the uprising, descendants of the last Siberian Khan Kuchum lived in south-east. Having lost the Siberian Khanate to Russia in 1598, the House of Siberia was looking for an opportunity to organize anti-Russian actions. Consequently, the uprising in Bashkiria from their point of view, was very welcome. On the move in 1662, they did not participate. But, since the winter of this year, one of them—the Siberian prince Kucuk—is among the Bashkirs Siberian Darugha. Kucuk appeared in the camp of the rebels after the death of their top leader Sarah Mergen in early 1663.

We know that the princes of Siberia, including Kucuk, did not represent a major force in the military sense. The rebels were trying, apparently, to use the Prince as a figure around which they could unite the mass of non-Russian Trans-Urals. It is no accident they were negotiating in parallel with the Kalmyks to get more help.

Trans-Ural rebels operating in the river basins Iset, Neiva, Irbit attacked forts, settlements, monasteries, established on Bashkir lands. The rebel Nogai and Kazan horsemen are still operating in the central and western region, near Ufa and the Trans-Kama fortresses. The residents of these roads were also looking for allies. They have established relationships with the Kalmyk taishas Daichin s and Ayuka. Bashkirs supported Mansi (Voguls), and Kungurskye Siberian Tatars, Mari, Kalmyks. The tsarist government once again offered the Bashkirs to negotiate. Rebels Nogai resumed talks with the commander of Ufa in autumn 1663. Their ambassadors Dinmukhamet Yulaev and Aktai Dosmuhametov in early 1664 went to Moscow and in February returned to grant charters, in which the king has granted the Nogai Bashkirs. The Bashkir Kazan Darugha began negotiations with the commander of Ufa in the summer of 1664. In autumn 1664 the Siberia Bashkirs also resumed talks with the tsarist authorities. Their ambassadors visited Tobolsk and entered into an agreement with the governor.

== Results of the insurrection ==
The tsarist government, unable to defeat the rebels, was forced to meet their basic requirements. Ufa governor's Stolnik Andrei Volkonsky was prematurely removed from office, and replaced, at the request of the Bashkirs, by F.I. Somov. More significant was a concession to the government on the land issue: the patrimonial right to land of the Bashkirs was officially confirmed. The new governor was ordered to consider petitions by Bashkirs against land grab by Russian migrants and to meet their demands. The government also promised to end the abuses by tribute collectors as well.

== See also ==
- Bashkir rebellion of 1681–1684
- Bashkir rebellion of 1704–1711
- Bashkir rebellion of 1735–1740

== Sources ==
- Bashkir Rebellion 1662–1664 Biennium, Bashkir Encyclopedia
- Ustiugov NV, Bashkir rebellion 1662–1664 gg., To Sat: Historical Records, Vol 24, Moscow, 1947;
- Akmanov, I.G. Башкирские восстания XVII — начала XVIII вв. [Bashkir Rebellion 17th — Beginning of the 18th Century]. - Ufa Kitap, 1998.
- Akmanov, I.G. Башкирия в составе Российского государства в XVII — первой половине XVIII в. [Bashkortostan within the Russian state in the 17th — the first half of the 18th century]. - Sverdlovsk: in the Urals. University Press, 1991.
