= History of Bashkortostan =

The history of Bashkortostan or Bashkiria covers the region in and around the Southern Urals, historically inhabited by Bashkirs. The region has been known by several names, including al-Bashgird, Bashgirdia, Bascardia, Fiyafi Bashqurt (The Bashqurt steppes), Pascatir and similar variants. As with previous names, the modern federal subject of Bashkortostan was named after the native Bashkir people.

== Prehistory ==
The first known settlements in the territory of modern Bashkortostan date from the early Paleolithic period. Major expansion, however, occurred during the Bronze Age with the arrival of people from the Abashevo culture. They possessed skills in manufacturing bronze tools, weapons and decorations, and became the first to establish permanent settlements in the region.

== Early history ==
Records of the ethnonym Bashkirs start in the 7th century. Ibn Ruste (fl. 10th century) describes the Bashkirs as "an independent people, occupying territories on both sides of the Ural mountain ridge between Volga, Kama, Tobol and upstream of Yaik river".

The earliest source to give a geographical description of Bashkir territory, Mahmud al-Kashgari's Divanu Lugat’it Turk (1072–1074), includes a map with a charted region called Fiyafi Bashqyrt (the Bashkir steppes). Despite a lack of much geographic detail, the sketch map does indicate that the Bashkirs inhabited a territory bordering on the Caspian Sea and the Volga valley in the west, the Ural Mountains in the north-west, and the Irtysh valley in the east, thus giving a rough outline of the area. Even earlier, in the 10th century, Ahmad ibn Fadlan mentions "the country al-Bashgird" in his itinerary and enumerates the rivers he had to cross during his trip.

== Early statehood ==
No reliable data exists attesting to early Bashkir statehood in the Southern Urals.

However, works by ibn Fadlan, Giovanni del Carpine, William of Rubruck, as well as Bashkir epic poetry and genealogies (shejere) suggest that an independent local governance had existed in the region before the 13th century.

When talking about this period, Sergei Rudenko cites Abu Zayd al-Balkhi to state that the western parts of Bashkiria were part of and administered by Volga Bulgaria. Z.I. Enikeev references R.G. Kuzeev and states that "...The Bashkirs of the tribes bülär, yänäy, meñ and äyle wrote in their genealogies that the Bulgar khans Aidar, Säit, Ämir, Sälim, Ilham and Ğabdulla were their rulers. Z.I. Enikeev also relies upon another work by R.G. Kuzeev to maintain that Tabyn Khanate, a strong Bashkir nationstate had existed within Dasht-i Qipchaq, the confederation of Turkic states, before the Mongol invasion.

The Hungarian monk Julian indicates in his itinerary that Bashkirs had their own ruler (khan) in 1235-1236.

== Introduction of Islam ==
Islam was introduced to the Bashkirs by the Volga Bulgars, who had adopted Islam in the 10th century.

One of the earliest remnants of the introduction of Islam is the historical site near Chishmy, Chishminsky District. The site contains a rock with an Arabic inscription saying that Husein-bek, the son of Izmer-bek, resides at the location, who died on the 7th day of the month Muharram in year 444 of Hijra, i.e. 1066 AD.

Evidence also exists that Islam came to the Southern Urals from Middle Asia. For example, the 13th century burial site of two Muslim missionaries is preserved in the Bashkir Trans-Uralia, near the village of Starobairamgulovo, Uchalinsky District.

== Mongol Empire ==
In the 13th century, Historical Bashkortostan fell under the influence of the Mongol Empire. Some sources, including G.Carpine and I.Rudenko, report that Bashkortostan was conquered by Mongols after the fall of Volga Bulgaria. I. Rudenko believes Volga Bulgaria was conquered by Mongols in 1229, while in 1236 "...the entire Bashkiria was conquered..." Lev Gumilev says, perhaps using Friar Julian’s report as his source, that "the war between Mongols and Bashkirs continued for 14 years... The Bashkirs won multiple battles and, after all, concluded a treaty of friendship and cooperation, after which the Mongols forged an alliance with the Bashkirs for further conquests...". In his opinion, this happened in 1220–1223.

In Z.I. Enikeev's view, these two statements do not conflict each other. Those Bashkir tribes which were previously controlled by Volga Bulgaria, had to declare themselves dependents of the Mongol Empire after the fall of Bilär. However, the bulk of the Bashkir tribes, headed at that time by Muyten-biy, voluntarily entered the Mongol Empire.

The authors of the "History of Bashkortostan" maintain that the Bashkirs entered the Mongol State in 1207 or 1208, suggesting that "the entrance was both promoted by coercion and, at the same time, a voluntary act of recognition". In this respect, it is important to cite German Fedorov-Davydov’s opinion, who was an outstanding historian of the Golden Horde. When speaking of the fact that the Bashkirs had their own khan ruling over them, he pointed out that this was a special privilege granted to the Bashkirs as they willfully accepted the Mongol rule; normally, the Mongols would never keep alive the former rulers of the nations they conquered by force.

The very fact that the Bashkirs, as an individual nation, survived while the Mongols exterminated many other peoples who had lived in the adjacency, suggests that special relations existed between the conquerors and the medieval Bashkirs.

By 1294, though, the Mongol Empire had fractured, leaving the Bashkirs under the authority of the Golden Horde, one of the Mongol successor states.

== Russian Empire ==
After the Golden Horde, too, had broken apart, the territory of modern Bashkortostan was divided between the khanates of Kazan and Sibir and the Nogai Horde.

After Kazan fell to Ivan IV in October 1552, the Bashkirs joined the Russian Empire. Whether this was voluntary or the result of conquest is still debated.

=== Accession by negotiation ===
According to one version, after Ivan's victory over Kazan, the Russian government appealed to the peoples of the Khanate, including the western Bashkirs who had been subjects of the Kazan Khanate, to become subjects of the Russian tsar. The neighboring Nogai Horde at that time was stricken with internecine dissention, unrest and famine. Most of its population had migrated to the southern steppes and abandoned their camps; however, the danger of Nogai raids remained. The western Bashkirs became subjects of the Russian empire, and received credentials from the tsar confirming their patrimonial rights to their traditional lands as well as to the abandoned Nogai camps.

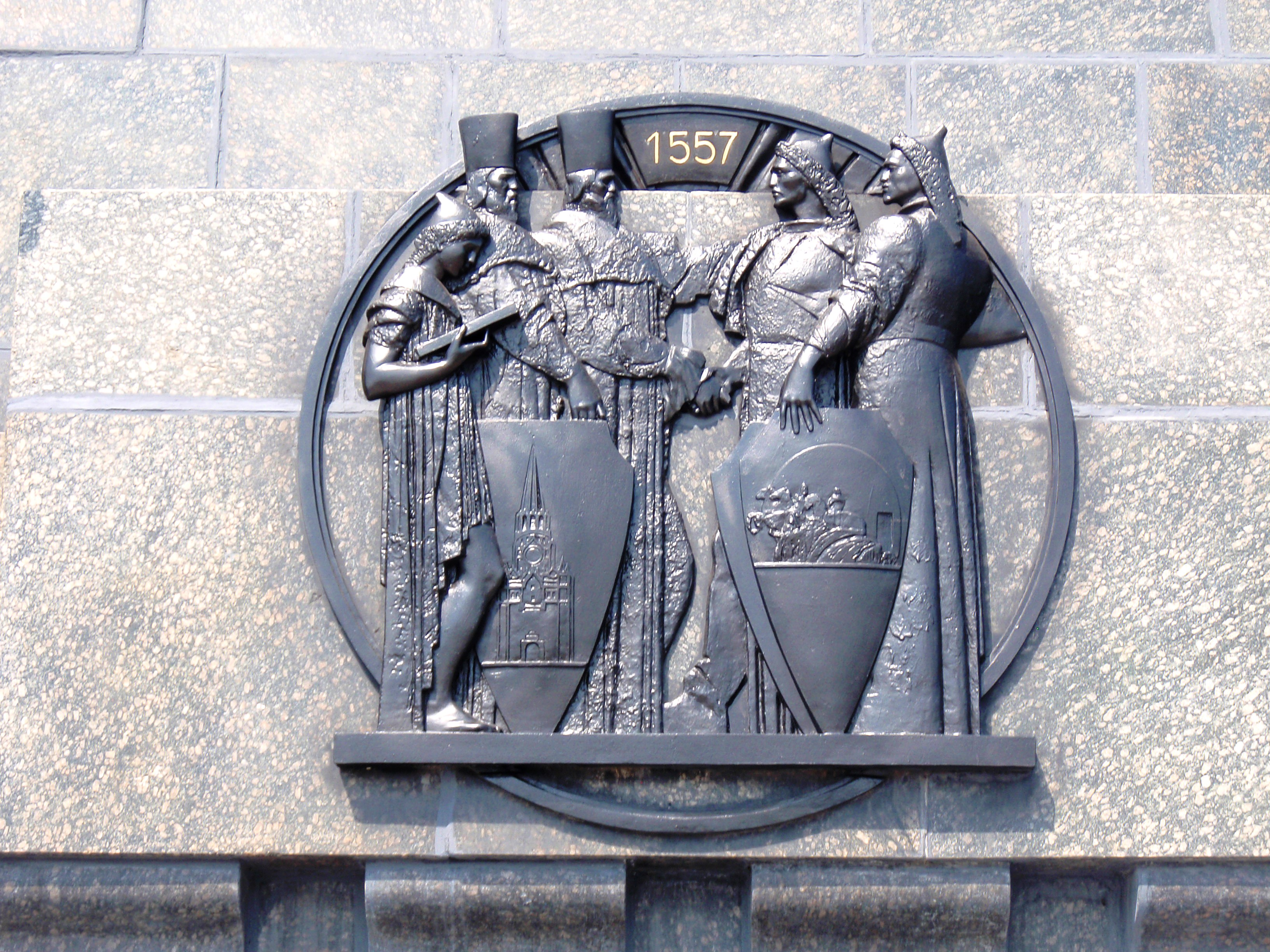
Annexation commemoration

As attested in the Bashkir legends, the negotiations with the Russian government's representatives were preceded by Bashkir nationwide meetings at which the annexation terms and conditions were discussed, along with who should be sent to "the White Padishah" as Bashkir delegates.

Patents were received from the Russian government which provided a detailed description of the annexation terms, and defined the land allotments and the taxes; the received patents were then again discussed at nationwide assemblies.

The annexation negotiations were expedited by the fact that Kalmucks and later Kazakhs began laying claims on the Bashkirs’ lands. In 1555–[1557], Bashkir councils in central and southern Bashkortostan sent their delegations to Kazan asking the Russian tsar to take them under his protection and patronage. The Bashkir shejere kept the names of the four biys (noblemen) who traveled to Kazan for negotiations: Tatagach-biy (the tribe of Yurmaty), Buranqul-biy (the tribe of Burzyan), Krakujak-biy (the tribe of Qypchaq), and Qanzafar-biy (the tribe of Meñ).

The negotiations between the Bashkir noblemen and the Russian tsar's representatives are also attested in the Russian chronicles and testimonies left by the contemporaries. By accepting Russian citizenship, the Bashkirs confirmed their patrimonial rights to the land, and ensured protection from the Nogay trespassers.

=== Accession by conquest ===
Meanwhile, an alternative viewpoint exists, primarily in Western historiography, which maintains that Bashkortostan never joined the Russian Empire of its own volition, but was conquered.

This viewpoint is spearheaded by the American historian Alton S. Donnelly, who analysed the factors of Bashkir's joining the Russian Empire and concluded that Bashkortostan was in fact conquered by the Russians and converted into Russia's internal colony. Donnelly studied tsarist policy adopted after the Bashkirs entered the Russian Empire, and emphasised the fact that the Bashkir rebellion (1662–64) and Bashkir Uprising (1704–11) were primarily caused by the Russian government's violations of the terms and conditions previously agreed between the Bashkirs and the Russian authorities. From this, Alton Donelly concludes that Russia pursued an "imperialistic" policy in the newly joined Bashkortostan and included a consistent infringement of the Bashkirs’ interests.

Russian historians also state that the Bashkir riots were primarily caused by the fact that the Russian government violated the conditions under which Bashkortostan joined the Russian Empire. However, they maintain that this fact cannot give ground to re-evaluations of the accession's circumstances: its free-will basis is attested by both Russian and Bashkir historical sources.

=== Growth within the Russian Empire ===
Starting from the second half of the 16th century, Bashkiria's territory began taking shape as a part of the Russian state. In 1798 the Spiritual Assembly of Russian Muslims was established; an indication that the imperial government recognised the rights of Bashkirs, Tatars, and other Muslim nations to profess Islam and perform religious rituals. Ufa Governorate, centred at Ufa, was formed in 1865: another step towards territorial identification.

== Soviet era ==
After the Russian Revolution, the Bashkir Autonomous Soviet Socialist Republic (ASSR) was established, firstly as Little Bashkortostan, but eventually all of Ufa Governorate was incorporated into the newly established republic. During the Soviet period, Bashkiria was granted broad autonomous rights- the first among other Russian regions. The administrative structure of the Bashkir ASSR was based on principles similar to those of other autonomous republics of Russia.

The extraction of crude oil in Bashkiria began in 1932. At the end of 1943, large crude oil deposits were discovered. During World War II, Bashkiria became one of the major regions of the Soviet Union to accommodate plants and factories evacuated from Western Russia, as well as great masses of people, as well as providing the country with weaponry, fuel, and foodstuffs. After the war, a good number of industries were further developed there, such as mining, machine construction and, especially, oil-refining. Bashkiria's industry became a solid base for the further economic growth of all European outlying territories of Russia.

There are numerous documented cases of deportations and executions conducted by Stalin regime in Bashkiria.

== Modern Bashkortostan ==
On October 11, 1990 the Supreme Soviet of the Republic adopted the Declaration on State Sovereignty of the Bashkir ASSR. On February 25, 1992 the Bashkir ASSR was renamed the Republic of Bashkortostan.

On March 31, 1992 the Federative Treaty “On separation of authorities and powers among federal organs of power of the Russian Federation and the organs of power of the sovereign republics in the composition of the Russian Federation” was signed stipulating that the constitutions and laws of the constituent republics should be consistent with the constitution and laws of the Russian Federation. On August 3, 1994 an Agreement "On separation of authorities and mutual delegating of powers among the organs of power of the Russian Federation and the organs of power of the Republic of Bashkortostan" was signed, recognizing Bashkortostan as a sovereign state within the Russian Federation. This agreement was effectively rescinded following the demand of the Constitutional Court of the Russian Federation in June 2009 to strike out all language referring to regional sovereignty. In addition to Bashkortostan, the ruling affected the republics of Tatarstan, Yakutia, and Tuva.

=== 2020 Kushtau Protests ===
In August 2020, Bashkortostan experienced significant environmental protests centered around Kushtau Hill, a site considered sacred by the local community. The Bashkir Soda Company (BSK) initiated limestone mining operations on Kushtau, leading to public outcry over potential environmental damage and the desecration of a cultural landmark. Clashes erupted between protesters and security personnel, resulting in approximately 50 detentions and the dismantling of protest encampments. In response to the escalating tensions, Bashkortostan Governor Radiy Khabirov met with activists on August 16, and announced the suspension of all mining activities on Kushtau until a mutually agreeable solution could be reached. This decision was seen as a victory for environmental and cultural preservation advocates.

=== 2024 Baymak Protests ===
In January 2024, mass protests erupted in Bashkortostan following the sentencing of environmental activist Fail Alsynov to four years in prison on charges of "inciting ethnic hatred." Many locals viewed the conviction as politically motivated due to Alsynov's opposition to regional mining activities. The demonstrations, initially centered in the town of Baymak, soon spread to Ufa, with participants demanding Alsynov's release and greater regional autonomy. Authorities responded with a heavy police presence, resulting in clashes and numerous arrests.
