= Bashkir rebellion of 1704–1711 =

Rebellion in the Russian Empire

Bashkir Rebellion of 1704–1711
- Part of Bashkir rebellions
Date	Summer 1704 – 1711
Location	Mainly Bashkortostan, Russia
Result	Stalemate

Belligerents
Tsardom of Russia; Kalmyk Khanate	Bashkir rebels Kazakh Khanate; Tatars; Nogais; Karakalpaks

Commanders and leaders
Peter the Great; Pyotr Khovansky; Sergeyev; Peter Khokhlov (Kalmyk Khanate) Ayuka Khan (Kalmyk Khanate) Chakdorjap	Dyume Ishkyev (executed); Aldar Isyangildin; Iman Batyr; Kusyum Tyulekyev; Khazi Akkuskarov; Urakay Yuldashbaev; Abul Khair Khan; Tauke Khan; Murat Kuchukov (executed)

The Bashkir Rebellion from 1704 to 1711 was one of the longest in the series of Bashkir rebellions in the 17th and 18th centuries in the Tsardom of Russia. The Bashkir uprisings of 1662–1664, 1681–1684, and 1704–1711 have been treated at length by Soviet and post-Soviet historians as evidence of Bashkiria's gradual incorporation into the empire and of Bashkir resistance to colonial oppression.

== Causes ==
In August 1704, at a meeting of the Bashkirian general tax collectors, M. A. Zhiharev Dohov read a new decree.

The decree introduced 72 new taxes, including for mosques, mullahs, and each person who went into a house of prayer. The decree also required building new mosques on the model of Christian churches, for example placing the cemetery near the mosque. All this was seen as a direct step to a future full-scale forcible baptism (conversion). In addition, the Russian authorities demanded 20,000 horses, and then another 4,000 soldiers, for use in the Great Northern War with Sweden.

== Course of hostilities ==
The rebellion began in the summer of 1704. At the beginning of 1705, in Ufa county, a punitive expedition was led by Sergeyev. Bringing together elected Bashkirs in Ufa, he demanded horses for the army of Russia. Under threat of death, they agreed to pay the treasury 5,000 horses. In response, the Bashkirs refused to pay taxes and obey the local authorities. Kazan Railway rebels headed by Dumey Ishkeev attacked the Zakamskaya fortress residents on Nogai road, led by Iman Batyr. Bashkir rebels proposed to appeal to the king directly with a petition, which was taken to Moscow in the summer of 1706 by eight elective Bashkirs, headed by Dumey Ishkeev. But the tsarist government refused to consider the petition. Dumey Ishkeev was hanged, and the others were arrested. Learning of this, the Bashkirs continued to fight.

During the Bashkir Uprising of 1704–1711, the Tsarists authorities had evidently encouraged their Kazakh allies to plunder and enslave Bashkirs.

=== Mass uprising and its suppression ===
In the autumn of 1707, the movement had become widespread. In December, the rebels crossed the Kama River, invading the districts of Kungur, Vyatka, and Kazan.

Renouncing Russian citizenship, the Bashkir feudal elite attempted to create a Bashkir Khanate associated vassal relation with Ottoman Empire and the Crimean Khanate.

In early 1708, the Government sent a punitive force against the rebels led by Prince Khovansky. In April–May 1708, the Bashkirs established contact with the Bulavin rebels and Cossacks of the Don. In May 1708, the government turned to the Bashkirs to start negotiations. Khovansky on behalf of the government promised to forgive the rebels and to consider their complaints against the local authorities. The Bashkirs agreed to stop fighting.

=== Rebellion in the Urals ===
In spring 1709, uprisings resumed in the Siberian and eastern Nogai roads. In the Transural region, a fight was led by Aldar Isyangildin and Urakay Yuldashbaev. The rebels had established a connection with the Karakalpaks and with them they attacked the forts, settlements, factories, monasteries and villages located on Bashkir lands in the river basins Iset, Miass and Techa. In 1710, fighting continued.

The last stage is characterized by an attempt in 1711 to renew the fight in the center of Bashkortostan. The initiative came from the Bashkirs Nogai and Kazan roads. The revolt was suppressed, but the imperial government had to make some concessions.

== Impact ==
The imperial government was forced to confirm the patrimonial rights of the Bashkirs, cancel new taxes, condemn tyranny and violence of local authorities, and at the end of 1711, fighting in the region ceased. The embassy of Bashkirs again swore allegiance to the emperor only in 1725. The victory was Pyrrhic, human and material losses were huge.

Even though the last war of this period took place during the second half of Peter's reign, considering the results of this episode, this war was more typical of the Muscovite period than of Peter the Great's reign because it ended in the misleading impression on the part of Bashkirs that they had emerged victorious in appearance and the central government stepped back which was good enough for Bashkirs at the moment. Once again the central government proved to not be strong enough to pacify this belligerent people for the same reasons as were witnessed during the earlier wars.

== See also ==
- Bashkir rebellion of 1662–1664
- Bashkir rebellion of 1681–1684
- Bashkir rebellion of 1735–1740

== Bibliography ==
- Usmanov, Hamza (1996). История Башкортостана с древнейших времён до 60-х годов XIX века (in Russian). ISBN 5-295-01490-8.
- Akmanov, Irek (2016). Башкирские восстания XVII–XVIII веков – феномен в истории народов Евразии (in Russian). ISBN 978-5-295-06448-7.
- Hammidulin, Salawat; Aznabayev, Bulat (2017). История башкирских родов. Сарт и Калмак (in Russian). Vol. 27. ISBN 978-5-295-06821-8.
- Zinurov, Rafail (2001). Башкирские восстания и индейские войны – феномен в мировой истории (in Russian). ISBN 5-7501-0214-9.
- Akmanov, Irek (1993). Башкирские восстания (in Russian). ISBN 5-295-01126-7. Archived from the original on 2023-07-30.
- Togan, Zeki (2010). История башкир [History of Bashkirs] (in Russian). ISBN 978-5-295-05000-8.
