= Bashkirs =

Turkic ethnic group

Башҡорттар (Bashkir)
- Flag of Bashkortostan

Total population
- 1.6 million

Regions with significant populations
- Russia 1,571,879 • Bashkortostan 1,268,806
- Kazakhstan: 19,996 (2023)
- Ukraine: 3,200
- Belarus: 607 (2009)
- Turkmenistan: 3,820 (1995)
- Moldova: 600
- Latvia: 205 (2023)
- Lithuania: 84 (2011)
- Estonia: 115 (2025)
- Kyrgyzstan: 1,111
- Azerbaijan: 533 (1989)
- Armenia: 145
- Tajikistan: 143 (2010)

Languages
- Bashkir, Russian, Tatar

Religion
- Sunni Islam

Related ethnic groups
- Volga Tatars, Kazakhs, Nogais, Crimean Tatars

The Bashkirs (UK: /bæʃˈkɪərz/ bash-KEERZ, US: /bɑːʃˈkɪərz/ bahsh-KEERZ) or Bashkorts (Bashkir: Башҡорттар, romanized: Başqorttar, pronounced [bɑʂ.qʊɾt.ˈtaɾ]; Russian: Башкиры, romanized: Başkirı, pronounced [bɐʂˈkʲirɨ]) are a Turkic ethnic group indigenous to Russia. They are concentrated in Bashkortostan, a republic of the Russian Federation and in the broader historical region of Badzhgard, which spans both sides of the Ural Mountains, where Eastern Europe meets North Asia. Smaller communities of Bashkirs also live in the Republic of Tatarstan, Perm Krai, the oblasts of Chelyabinsk, Orenburg, Tyumen, Sverdlovsk, Kurgan, and other regions in Russia; sizeable minorities exist in Kazakhstan.

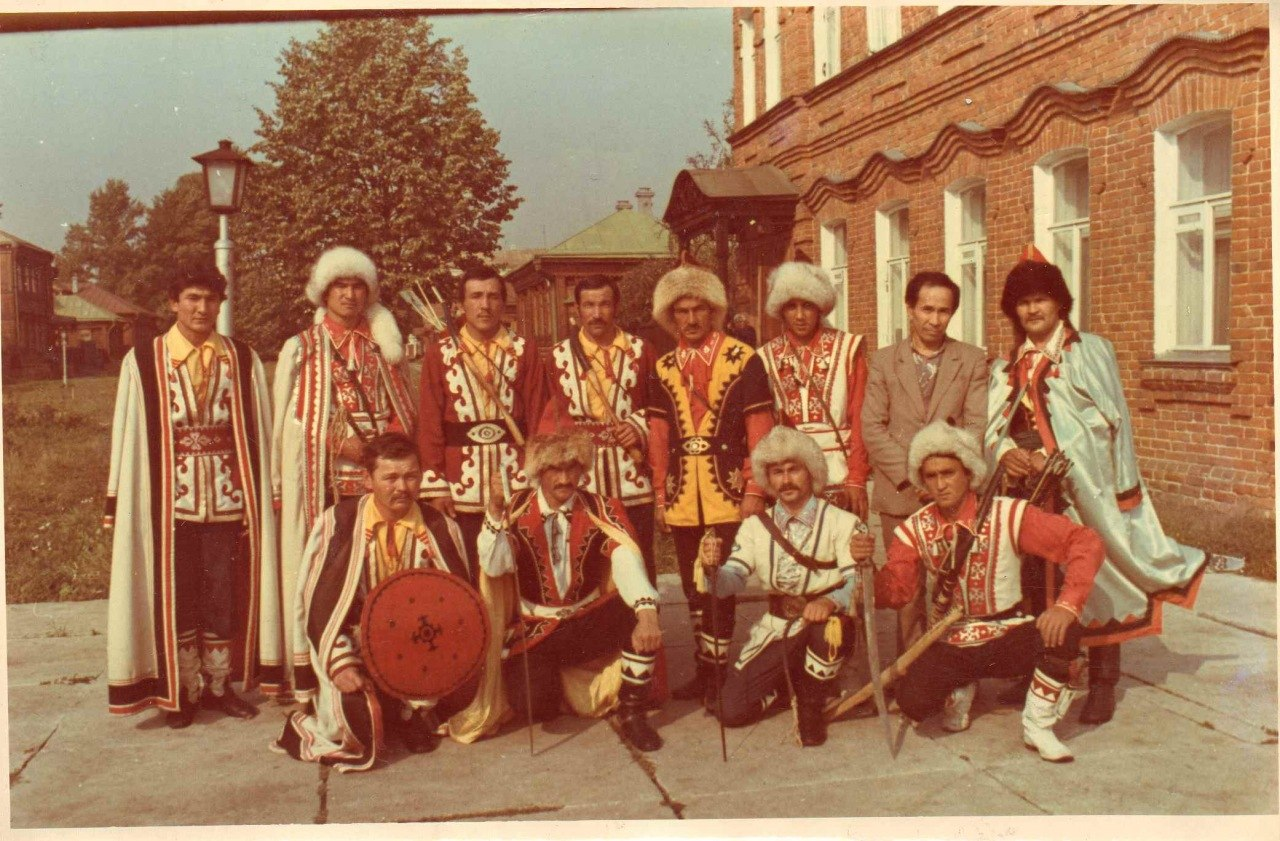
Bashkirs in traditional clothing

Most Bashkirs speak the Bashkir language, which is similar to the Tatar, Kazakh and Kyrgyz languages. The Bashkir language belongs to the Kipchak branch of Turkic languages; they share historical and cultural affinities with the broader Turkic peoples. Bashkirs are mainly Sunni Muslims of the Hanafi school madhhab, or school of jurisprudence, and follow the Jadid doctrine. Previously nomadic and fiercely independent, the Bashkirs gradually came under Russian rule beginning in the 16th century; they have since played a major role through the history of Russia, culminating in their autonomous status within the Russian Empire, Soviet Union and post-Soviet Russia.

== Ethnonym ==
The etymology and indeed meaning of the endonym Bashqurt has been for a long time under discussion.

The name Bashqurt has been known since the 10th century, most researchers etymologize the name as "main/leader/head" (bash) + "wolf" (qurt being an archaic name for the animal), thus "wolf-leader" (from the totemic hero ancestor).

This prevailing folk etymology relates to a legend regarding the migration of the first seven Bashkir tribes from the Syr Darya valley to the Volga-Ural region. The legend relates that the Bashkirs were given a green and fertile land by the fertility goddess of Tengrism Umay (known locally also as Umay-əsə), protected by the legendary Ural mountains (in alignment with the famous Bashkir epic poem "Ural-Batyr"). A wolf was sent to guide these tribes to their promised land, hence bash-qurt, "leading wolf". The ethnographers V. N. Tatishchev, P. I. Richkov, and Johann Gottlieb Georgi provided similar etymologies in the 18th century.

Although this is the prevailing theory for an etymology of the term bashqurt, other theories have been formulated:

- In 1847, the historian V. S. Yumatov speculated the original meaning to have been "beekeeper or beemaster".
- Douglas Morton Dunlop proposed bashqurt being derived from the forms beshgur, bashgur, which means "five oghurs". Since modern sh corresponds to l in Bulgar language. Therefore, Dunlop proposes the ethnonyms Bashqurt and Bulgar are equivalent. Zeki Velidi Togan also suggested this.
- Historian and ethnologist A. E. Alektorov has suggested that Bashqurt meant "distinct nation".
- Anthropologist R. M. Yusupov considered Bashqurt may originally have been an Iranian compound word meaning "wolf-children" or "descendants of heroes", on the basis of the words bacha "descendant, child" and gurd "hero" or gurg "wolf".
- Historian and archaeologist Mikhail Artamonov suggested that the word is a corruption of the name of the Bušxk (or Bwsxk), a tribe of Scythia that lived in the area now known as Bashkortostan.
- Ethnologist N. V. Bikbulatov suggested that the term originated from the name of a legendary Khazar warlord named Bashgird, who ruled an area along the Yayıq river.
- Ethnologist R. G. Kuzeev derived the ethnonym from the morphemes bash "leader, head" and qurt "tribe".
- Historian and linguist András Róna-Tas argued the ethnonym "Bashkir" to be a Bulgar Turkic reflex of the Hungarian endonym Magyar (or the Old Hungarian Majer).

== History ==
=== Origins ===
The Bashkir group was formed by Turkic tribes of South Siberian and Central Asian origin, who, before migrating to the Southern Urals, wandered for a considerable time in the Aral-Syr Darya steppes (modern day central-southern Kazakhstan), coming into contact with the Pecheneg-Oghuz and Kimak-Kipchak tribes. Therefore, it is possible to note that the Bashkir people originates from the same tribes which compose the modern Kazakhs, Kyrgyz and Nogais, but there has been a considerable cultural and a small ethnic exchange with Oghuz tribes.

The migration to the valley of the Southern Urals took place between the end of the 9th century and the beginning of the 10th century, in parallel to the Kipchak migration to the north.

=== Middle Ages ===
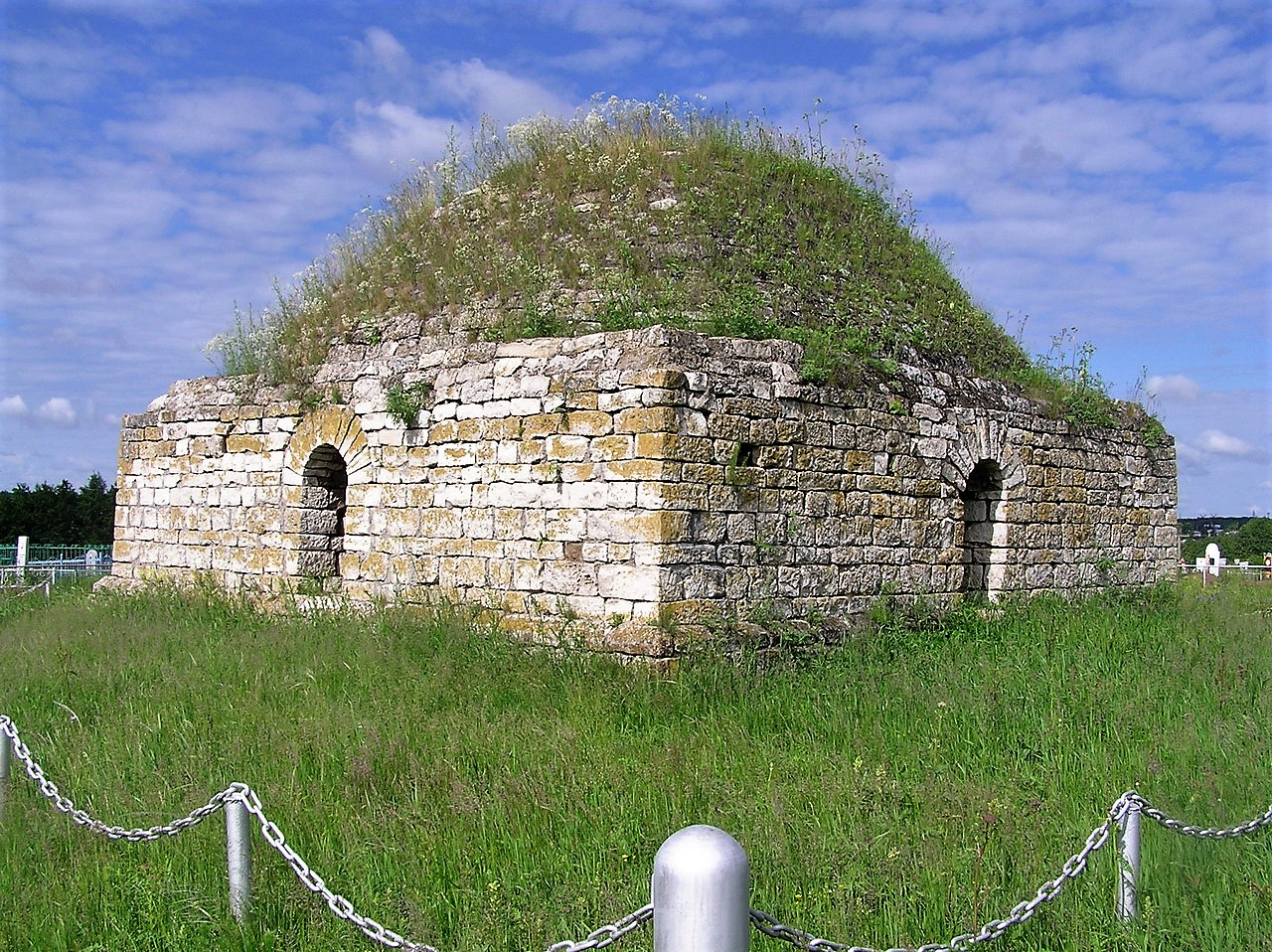
Mausoleum of Husseinbek of the 14th century in Bashkortostan

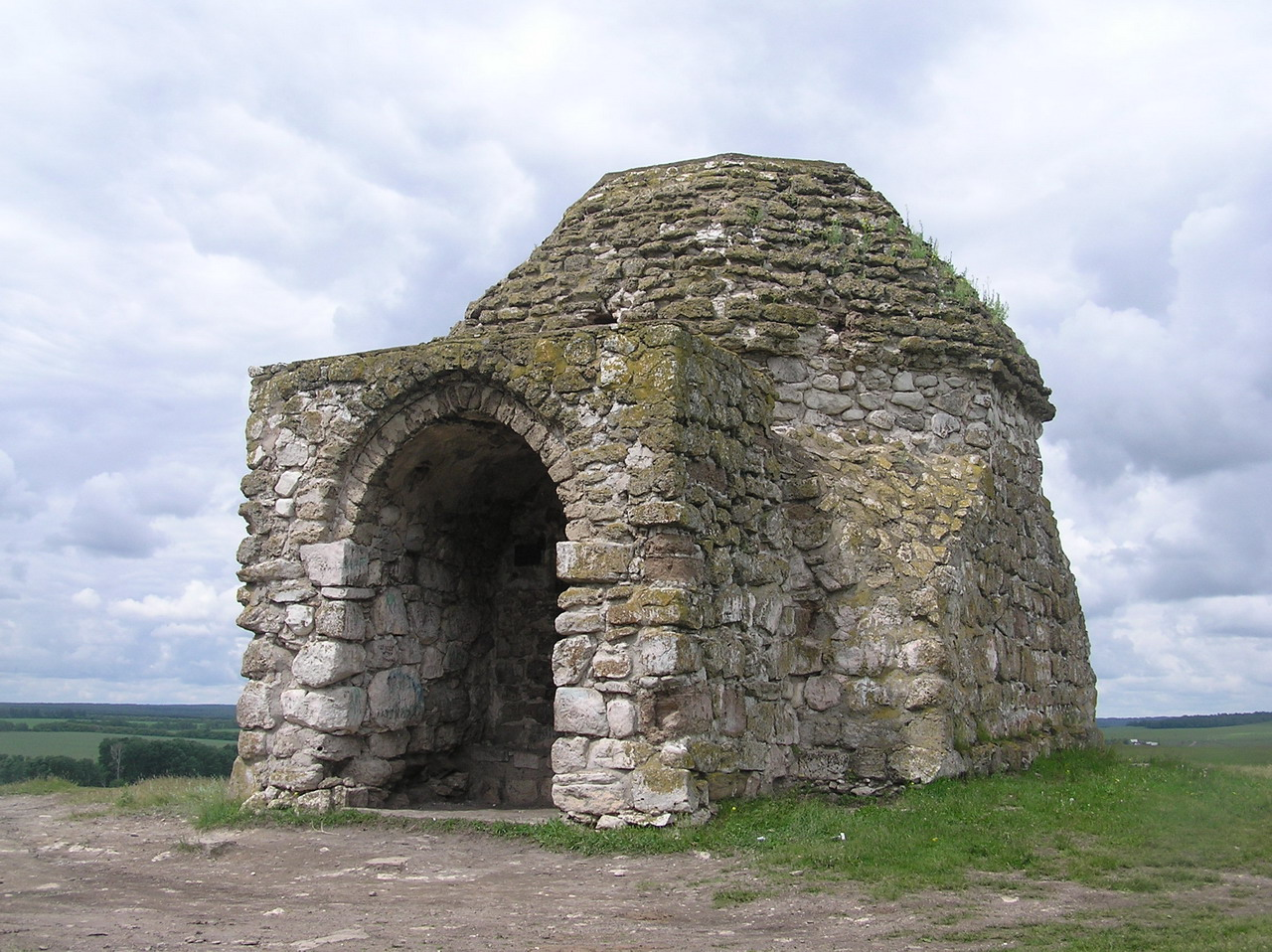
Mausoleum of Turakhan of the 15th century in Bashkortostan

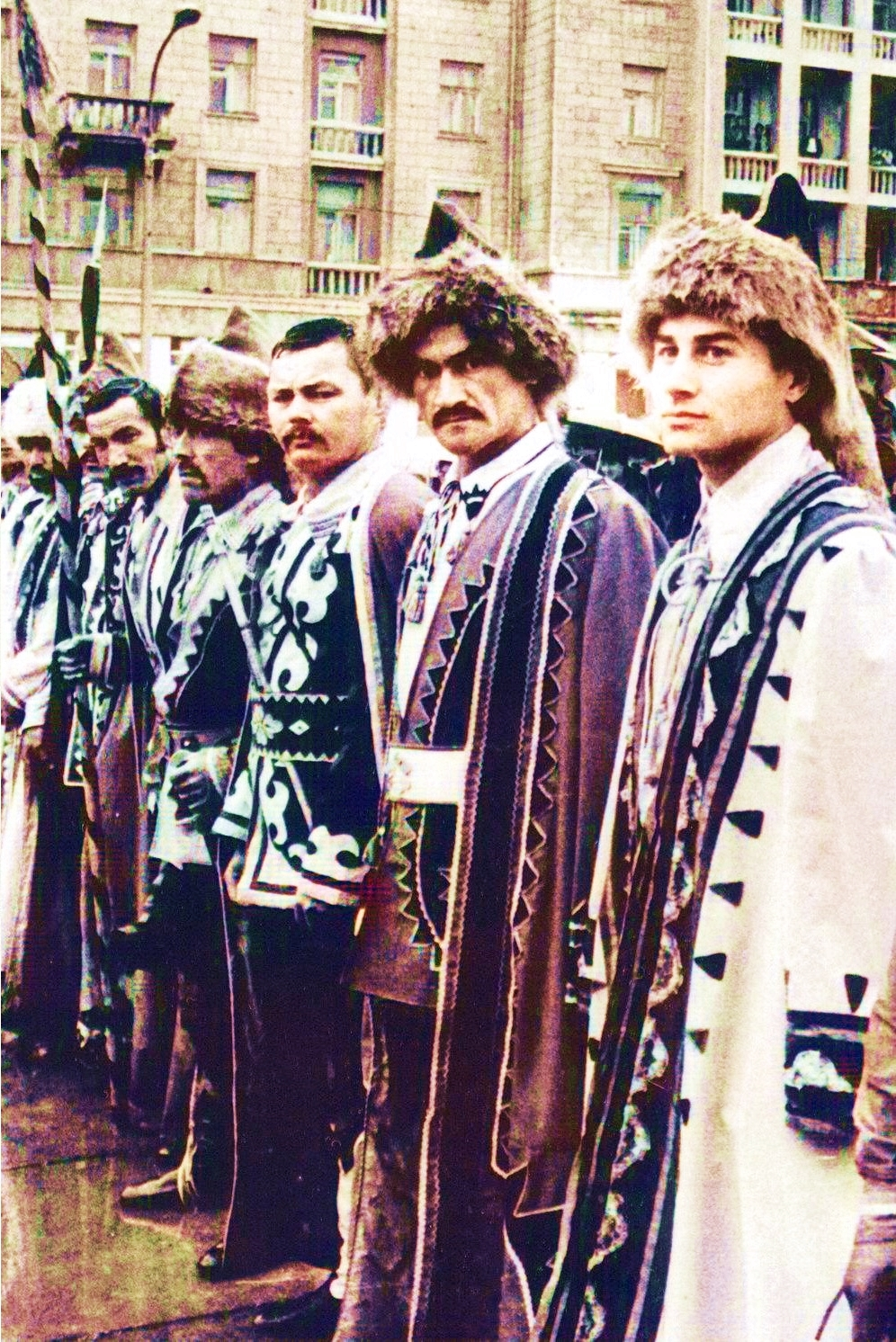
Bashkirs of Baymak in traditional dress

The first report about Bashkirs may have been in the Chinese chronicle Book of Sui (636 AD). Around 40 Turkic Tiele tribes were named in the section "A Narration about the Tiele people"; Bashkirs might have been included within that narration, if the tribal name 比干 (Mandarin Bǐgān ← Middle Chinese ZS: *piɪ^{X}-kɑn) (in Book of Wei) were a scribal error for 比千 (Bĭqiān ← *piɪ^{X}t͡sʰen) (in History of the Northern Dynasties), the latter reading being favored by Chinese scholar Rui Chuanming.

In the 7th century, Bashkirs were also mentioned in the Armenian Ashkharatsuyts.

However, these mentions may refer to the precursors of the Kipchak Bashkir tribes who travelled in the Aral-Syr Darya region before the migration. The Book of Sui may have mentioned "Bashkirs" when the Turkic peoples were still travelling through southern Siberia.

In the 9th century, during the migration of the Bashkirs to the Volga-Ural region, the first Arabic and Persian-written reports about Bashkirs are attested. These include reports by Sallam al-Tardjuman who around 850 travelled to the Bashkir territories and outlined their borders.

In the 10th century, the Persian historian and polymath Abu Zayd al-Balkhi described Bashkirs as a people divided into two groups: one inhabiting the Southern Urals, the other living on the Wallachian Plain–Danubian Plain near the boundaries of Byzantium. (Note: These sources may have confused Bashkirs with Hungarians, since the area of Modern Bashkortostan is often referred as "Magna Hungaria", the zone where the Magyar tribes dwelled before their migration to Europe; it is believed that Bashkirs may have come into contact with these Magyar tribes, since some of the Northern Tribes of the modern Bashkirs do have genetic correspondence with Hungarians) Ibn Rustah, a contemporary of Abu Zayd al-Balkhi, observed that Bashkirs were an independent people occupying territories on both sides of the Ural Mountains ridge between Volga, Kama, and Tobol Rivers and upstream of the Yaik river.

Ahmad ibn Fadlan, ambassador of the Baghdad Caliph Al-Muqtadir to the governor of Volga Bulgaria, wrote the first ethnographic description of the Bashkir in 922. The Bashkirs, according to Ibn Fadlan, were a warlike and powerful people, which he and his companions (a total of five thousand people, including military protection) "bewared... with the greatest threat". They were described as engaged in cattle breeding. According to ibn Fadlan, the Bashkirs worshipped twelve gods: winter, summer, rain, wind, trees, people, horses, water, night, day, death, heaven and earth, and the most prominent, the sky god. Apparently, Islam had already begun to spread among the Bashkirs, as one of the ambassadors was a Muslim Bashkir. According to the testimony of Ibn Fadlan, the Bashkirs were Turks, living on the southern slopes of the Urals, and occupying a vast territory up to the river Volga. They were bordered by Oghuz Turks on the south, Pechenegs to the south-east and Bulgars on the west.

The earliest source to give a geographical description of Bashkir territory, Mahmud al-Kashgari's Divanu Lugat'it Turk (1072–1074), includes a map with a charted region called Fiyafi Bashqyrt (the Bashkir steppes). Despite a lack of much geographic detail, the sketch map does indicate that the Bashkirs inhabited a territory bordering on the Caspian Sea and the Volga valley in the west, the Ural Mountains in the north-west, and the Irtysh valley in the east, thus giving a rough outline of the area.

Said Al-Andalusi and Muhammad al-Idrisi mention the Bashkir in the 12th century. The 13th-century authors Ibn Sa'id al-Maghribi, Yaqut al-Hamawi and Qazvini and the 14th-century authors Al-Dimashqi and Abu'l-Fida also wrote about Bashkirs.

The first European sources to mention the Bashkirs were the works of Friar Julian, Joannes de Plano Carpini and William of Rubruquis of the 13th century.

By 1226, Genghis Khan had incorporated the lands of Bashkortostan into his empire. During the 13th and 14th centuries, all of Bashkortostan was a component of the Golden Horde. The brother of Batu-Khan, Shiban, received the Bashkir lands east of the Ural Mountains.

After the disintegration of the Mongol Empire, the Bashkirs were divided among the Nogai Horde, the Khanate of Kazan and the Khanate of Sibir, founded in the 15th century.

=== Early modern period ===
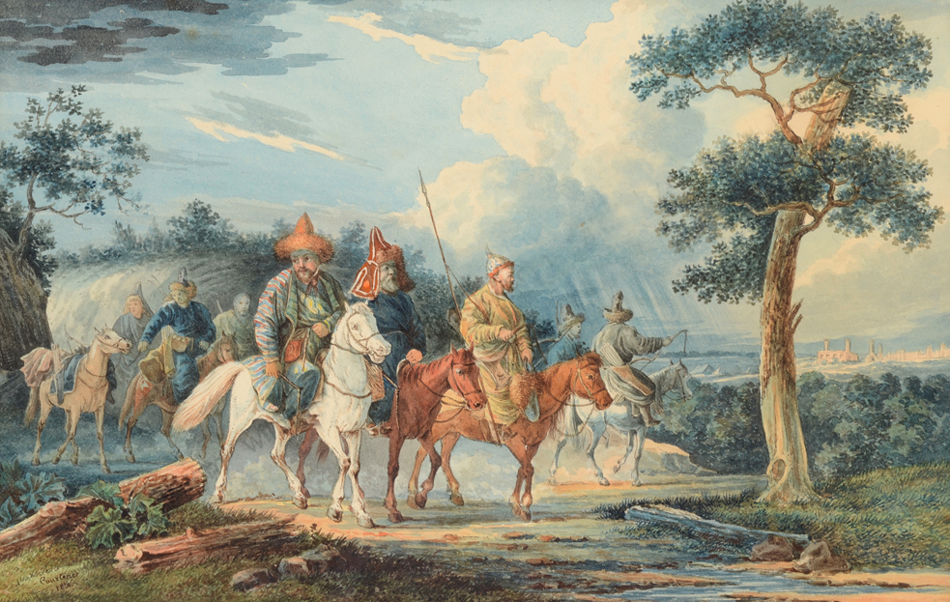
Bashkir riders

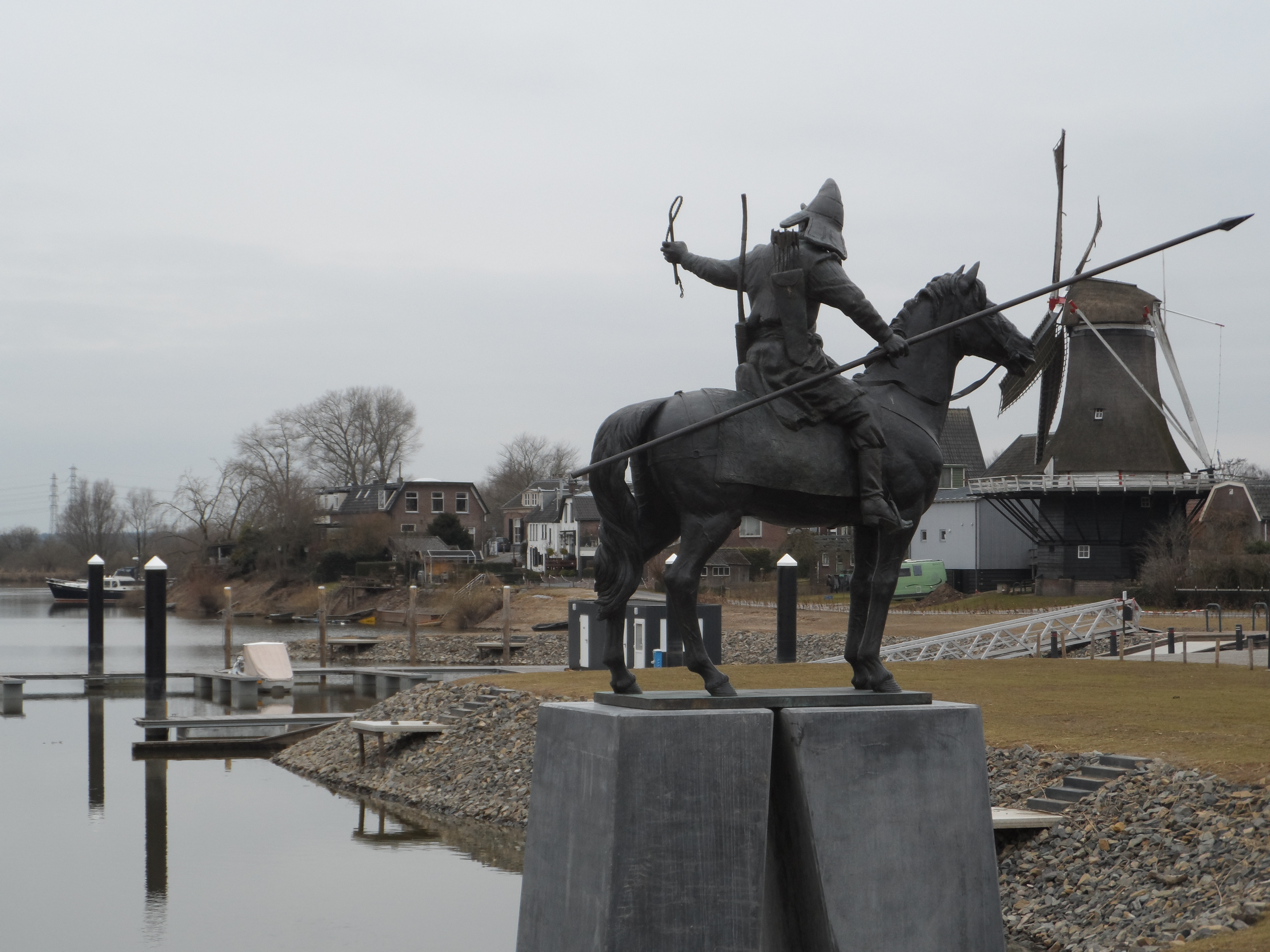
Bashkir sculpture in the haven of Veessen, Netherlands

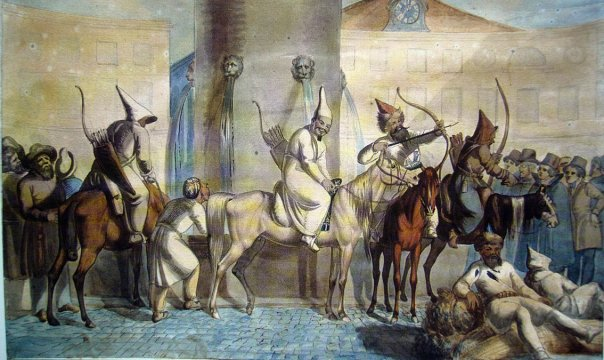
Bashkirs in Paris during the Napoleonic Wars, 1814

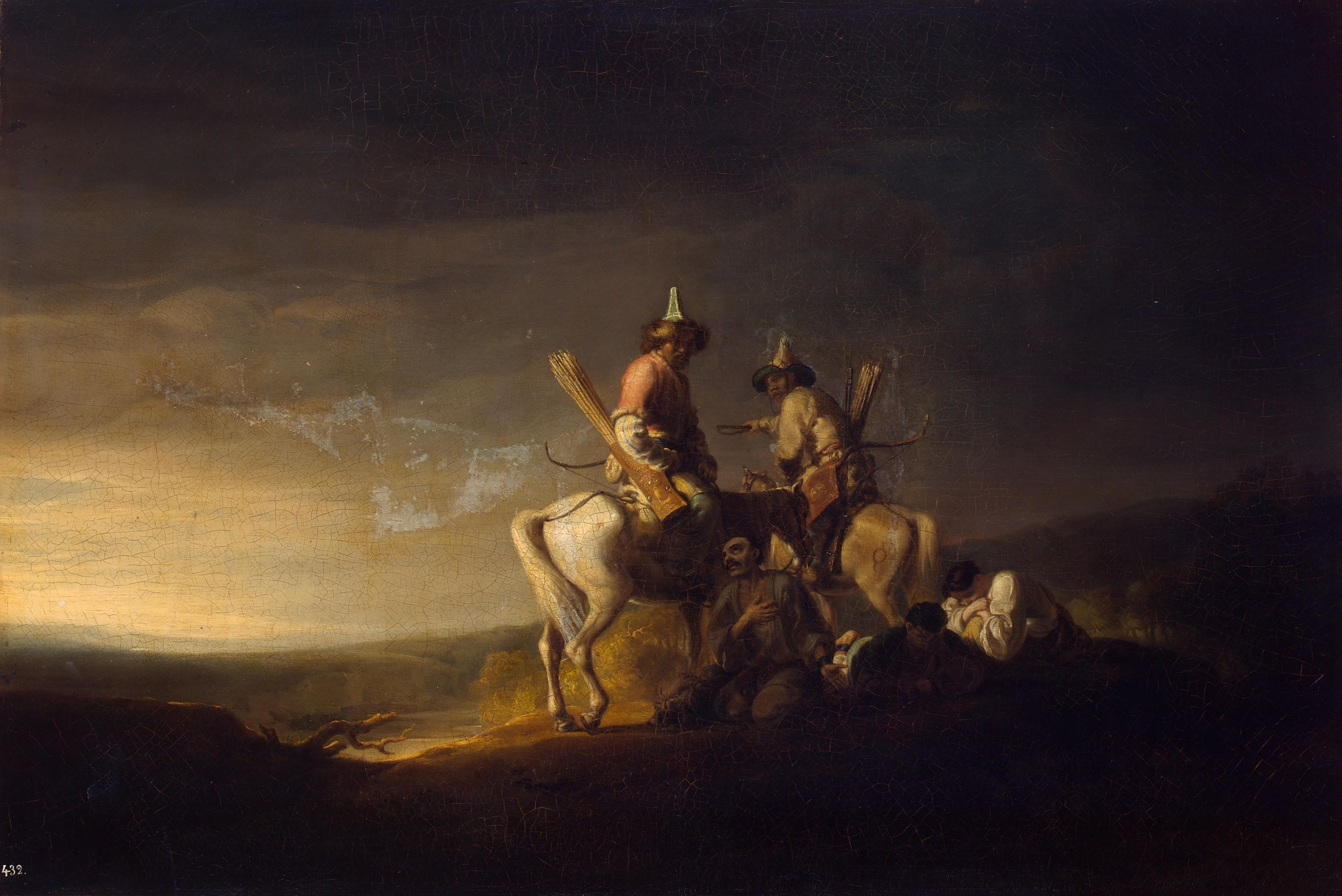
Bashkirs William Allan, 1814

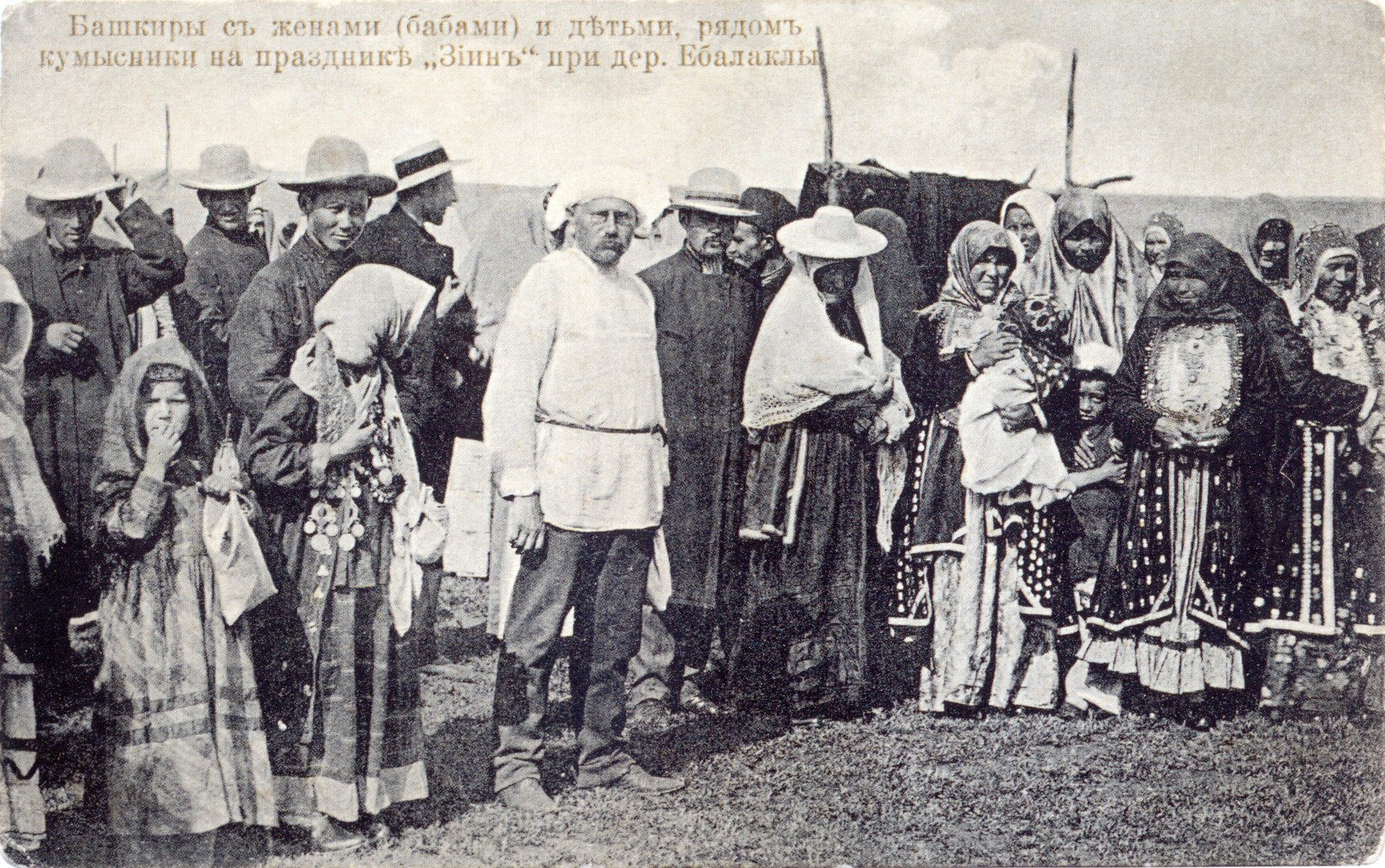
Bashkirs at the Jien festival

In the middle of the 16th century, Bashkirs were gradually conquered by the Tsardom of Russia. Primary documents pertaining to the Bashkirs during this period have been lost, although some are mentioned in the shezhere (family trees) of the Bashkir.

During the Russian Imperial period, Russians and Tatars began to migrate to Bashkortostan which led to eventual demographic changes in the region. The recruitment of Bashkirs into the Russian army and having to pay steep taxes pressured many Bashkirs to adopt a more settled lifestyle and to slowly abandon their ancient nomadic pastoralist past.

In the late 16th and early 19th centuries, Bashkirs occupied the territory from the river Sylva in the north, to the river heads of Tobol in the east, the mid-stream of the river Yaik (Ural) in the south; in the Middle and Southern Urals, the Cis-Urals including Volga territory and Trans-Uralsto, and the eastern bank of the river Volga on the south-west.

=== Bashkir rebellions of the 17th–18th centuries ===
The Bashkirs participated in the 1662–64, 1681–84 and 1704–11 uprisings. In 1676, the Bashkirs rebelled under a leader named Seyid Sadir or 'Seit Sadurov', and the Russian Army had great difficulties in ending the rebellion. The Bashkirs rose again in 1707, under Aldar and Kûsyom, due to perceived ill-treatment by Imperial Russian officials.

At the founding of Orenburg in 1735, the fourth insurrection occurred and lasted six years. Ivan Kirillov formed a plan to build the fort to be called Orenburg at Orsk at the confluence of the Or River and the Ural River, south-east of the Urals where the Bashkir, Kalmyk and Kazakh lands met. Work on Fort Orenburg commenced at Orsk in 1735. However, by 1743 the site of Orenburg was moved a further 250 km west to its current location. The next planned construction was to be a fort on the Aral Sea. The consequence of the Aral Sea fort would involve crossing Bashkir and the Kazakh Lesser Horde lands, some of whom had recently offered a nominal submission to the Russian Crown.

The southern side of Bashkiria was partitioned by the Orenburg Line of forts. The forts ran from Samara on the Volga east as far as the Samara River headwaters. It then crossed to the middle of the Ural River and following the river course east and then north on the eastern side of the Urals. It then went east along the Uy River to Ust-Uisk on the Tobol River where it connected to the ill-defined 'Siberian Line' along the forest-steppe boundary.

In 1774, the Bashkirs, under the leadership of Salavat Yulayev, supported Pugachev's Rebellion. In the late 1780s, the Bashkirs achieved tax-free status in exchange for providing soldiers to the Tsarist army; and in 1798 Russia formed an irregular Bashkir army from among them.

=== Napoleonic Wars ===
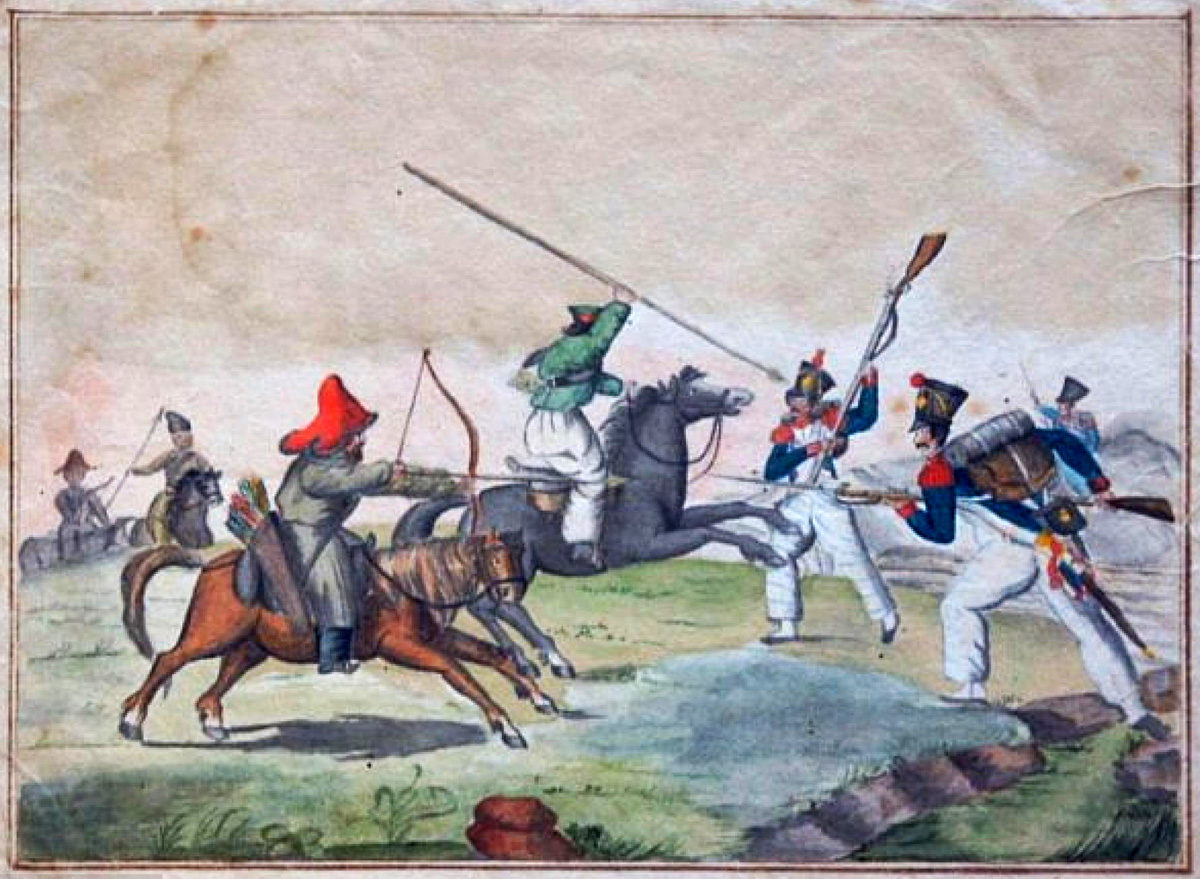
Bashkirs against French soldiers

During the Napoleonic Wars, many Bashkirs served as mercenaries in the Russian army to defend from the French invaders during Napoleon's invasion of Russia. Subsequently, the Bashkir battalions were the most notable fighters during the Napoleonic wars on the north German and Dutch plateau. The Dutch and the Germans called the Bashkirs "Northern Amurs", probably because the population was not aware of who the Bashkirs actually were or where they came from, therefore the usage of "Amurs" in the name may be an approximation; these battalions were considered as the liberators from the French, however modern Russian military sources do not credit the Bashkirs with these accomplishments. These regiments also served in the Battle of Paris and the subsequent occupation of France by the coalition forces.

=== Establishment of First Republic of Bashkortostan ===
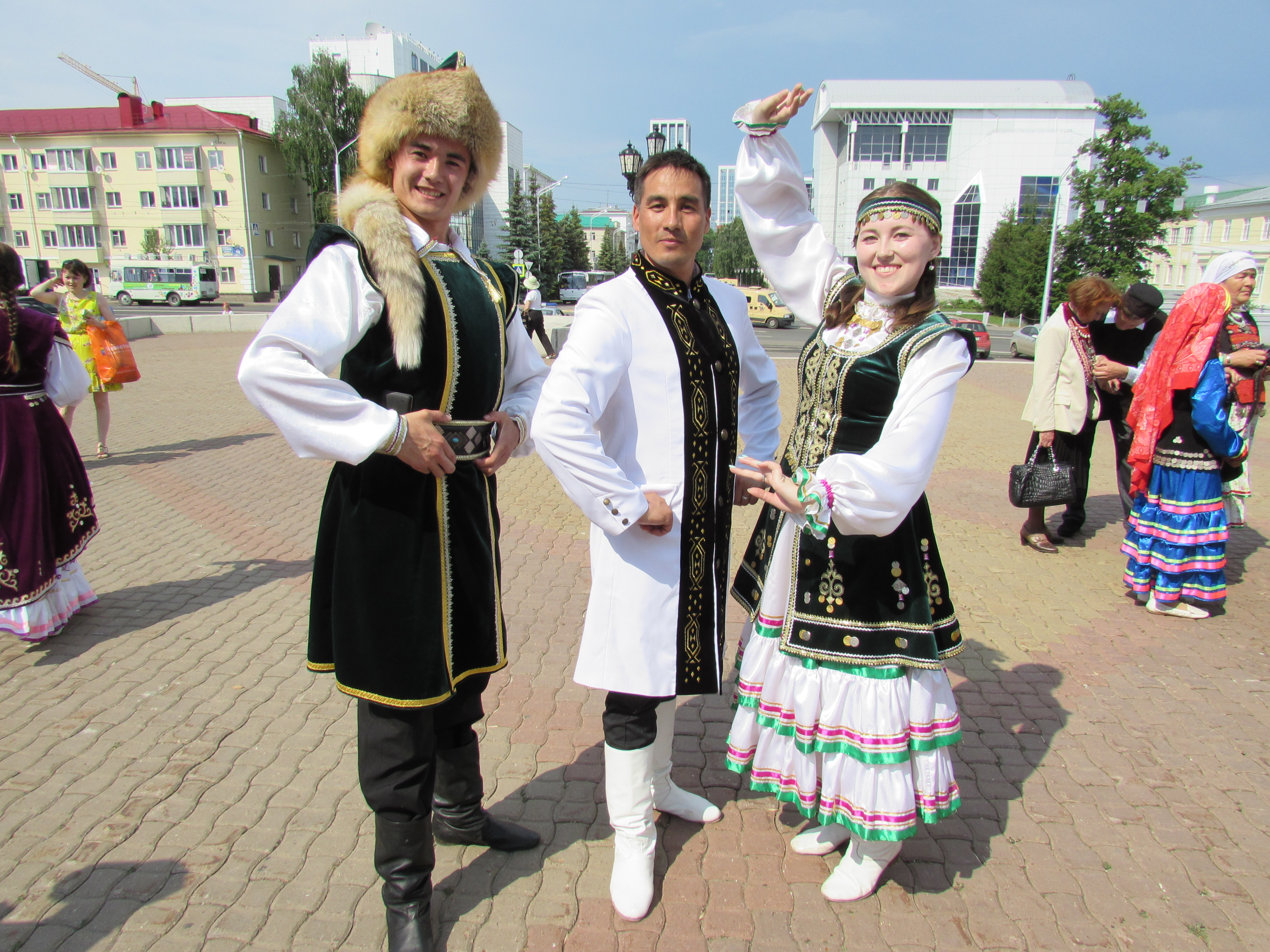
Bashkirs in traditional national costume

After the Russian Revolution, the All-Bashkir Qoroltays (convention) concluded that it was necessary to form an independent Bashkir republic within Russia. As a result, on 15 November 1917, the Bashkir Regional (central) Shuro (Council), ruled by Äxmätzäki Wälidi Tıwğan proclaimed the establishment of the first independent Bashkir Republic in areas of predominantly Bashkir population: Orenburg, Perm, Samara, Ufa provinces and the autonomous entity Bashkurdistan on November 15, 1917. This effectively made Bashkortostan the first ever democratic Turkic republic in history, preceding Crimea, Idel-Ural, and Azerbaijan.

=== Bashkir Autonomous Soviet Socialist Republic ===
In March 1919, the Bashkir Autonomous Soviet Socialist Republic was formed based on agreements of the Russian Government.

=== World War II ===
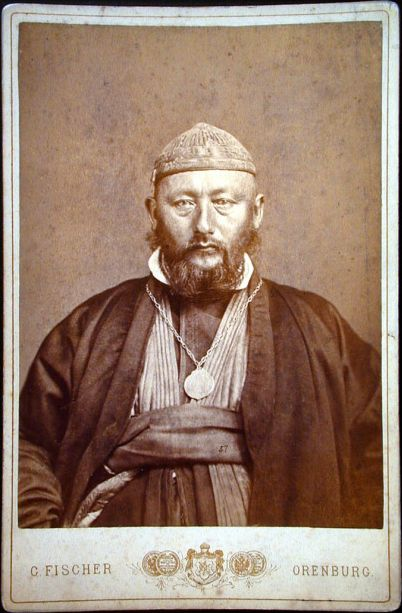
This Bashkir wears a medallion, which identifies him as the village chief. Photo by G. Fisher, Orenburg, 1892

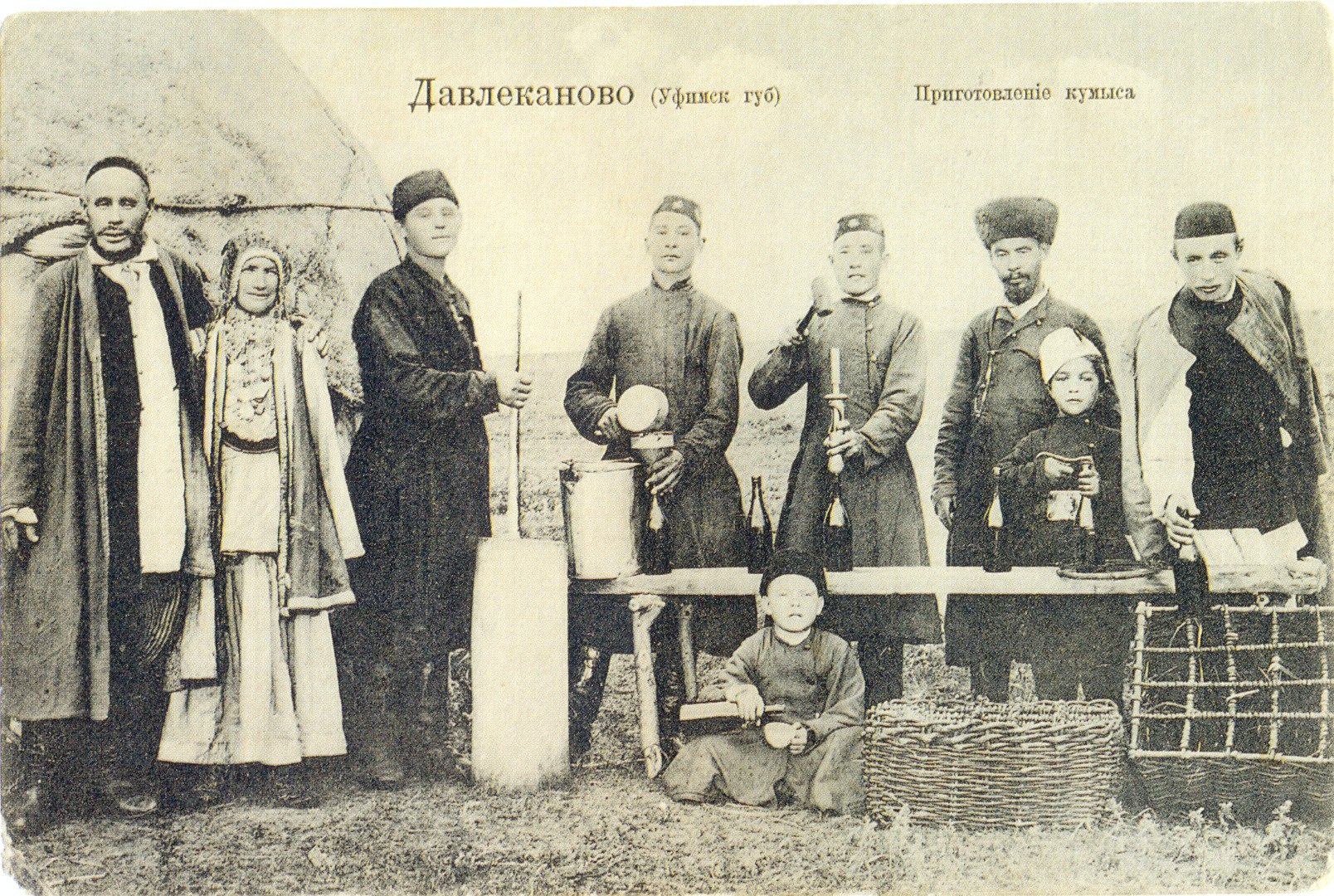
Davlekanovo (Ufa Governorate). Kumis cooking, the beginning of the 20th century

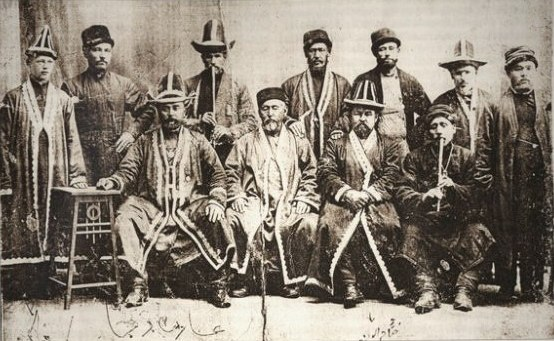
Bashkirs in Orenburg, at the celebration of the 100th anniversary of the victory in the Patriotic War of 1812, 1913

During World War II, Bashkir soldiers served in the Red Army to defend the Soviet Union and fought against the Germans during the German invasion of the Soviet Union.

=== Second declaration of independence ===
On October 11, 1990, Declaration of State Sovereignty by the Supreme Council of the Republic was proclaimed. On March 31, 1992 Bashkortostan signed a federal agreement on the delimitation of powers and areas of jurisdiction and the nature of contractual relations between the authorities of the Russian Federation and the authorities of the sovereign republics in its composition including the Republic of Bashkortostan.

== Bashkir tribes ==
North-eastern group: Aile, Badrak, Bikatin, Bishul, Duvan, Kalmak, Katai, Kossy, Kuvakan, Kudey, Kumruk, Murzy, Salyut, Syzgy, Synryan, Syrzy, Tabyn, Tersyak, Upey.

Northwest group: Baylar, Balyksy, Bulyar, Gaina, Gere, Duvaney, Elan, Adyak, Adey, Irekte, Kanly, Karshin, Kirghiz, Taz, Tanyp, Uvanysh, Un, Uran, Jurmi.

South-eastern group: Burzyan, Kypsak, Tamyan, Tangaur, Usergan, Jurmaty.

Southwest group: Ming.

== Genetics ==
=== Haplogroups ===
==== Maternal haplogroups ====
Mitochondrial (mtDNA) analysis of Bashkir populations has shown that approximately 65% of their haplogroups have Siberian or East Asian origin, while 35% have a West Eurasian origin.

==== Paternal haplogroups ====
Genetic studies on Y-DNA haplogroups have revealed that the three dominant paternal haplogroups for Bashkir males are the R1b-M269 and R1b-M73 (47,6 %), haplogroup R1a, and the haplogroup N1c. Haplogroups C-M217, O, and D1, were found at lower frequencies among Bashkir males, and together make up roughly 11,5%. Near Eastern-associated haplogroups J2 and G2 make up roughly 8,5%.

In some specific regions and clans of ethnic Bashkir, the North Asian and Eastern Siberian haplogroup (N3) range from moderate to high frequencies (29 to 90%).

Archaeogenetic analyses show a similarity between historical Hungarians, whose homeland is around the Ural Mountains, and Bashkirs; analysis of haplogroup N3a4-Z1936 which is still found in very rare frequencies in modern Hungarians, and showed that Hungarian "sub-clade [N-B539/Y13850] splits from its sister-branch N3a4-B535, frequent today among Northeast European Uralic speakers, 4000–5000 ya, which is in the time-frame of the proposed divergence of Ugric languages", while on N-B539/Y13850+ sub-clade level confirmed shared paternal lineages with modern Ugric (Mansis and Khantys via N-B540/L1034) and Turkic speakers (Bashkirs and Volga Tatars via N-B540/L1034 and N-B545/Y24365); these suggest that the Bashkirs are mixture of Turkic, Ugric and Indo-European contributions.

A genetic study published in Scientific Reports in November 2019 examined the remains of 29 Hungarian conquerors of the Carpathian Basin. The majority of them (60%) carried Y-DNA of West Eurasian origin, but at least 40% of East Eurasian (N1a-M2004, N1a-Z1936, Q1a and R1a-Z2124). They carried a higher amount of West Eurasian paternal ancestry than West Eurasian maternal ancestry. Among modern populations, their paternal ancestry was the most similar to modern Bashkirs. Haplogroup I2a1a2b was observed among several conquerors of particularly high rank. This haplogroup is of European origin and is today particularly common among South Slavs. A wide variety of phenotypes were observed, with several individuals having blond hair and blue eyes, but also East Asian traits. The study also analyzed three Hunnic samples from the Carpathian Basin in the 5th century, and these displayed genetic similarities to the conquerors. The Hungarian conquerors appeared to be a recently assembled heterogenous group incorporating both European, Asian and Eurasian elements. A group of Bashkirs from the Burzyansky and Abzelilovsky districts of the Republic of Bashkortostan in the Volga-Ural region who belong to the R1a subclade R1a-SUR51 are the closest kin to the Hungarian Árpád dynasty, from which they got separated 2000 years ago.

=== Autosomal DNA ===
According to Suslova, et al. (2012) the Bashkir population shared immune genes with both West and Eastern Eurasian populations.

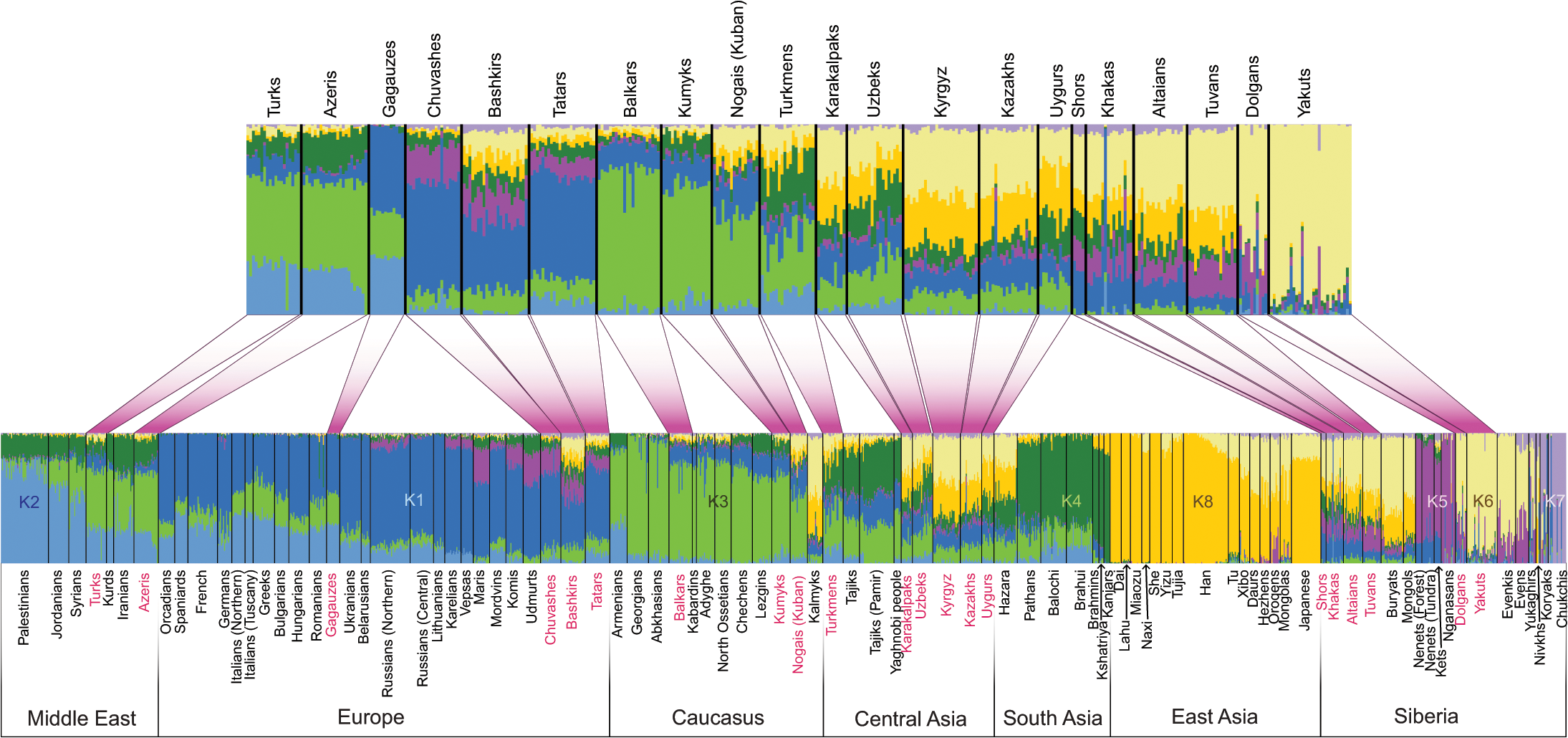
Population structure of Turkic-speaking populations in the context of their geographic neighbors across Eurasia.

A genetic study by Yunusbayev et al. 2015 found that the Bashkirs display a significant amount of East Eurasian-derived ancestry (c. 40%), of which roughly the half can be associated with Siberian ancestry maximized in modern-day Nganasans, and the other half with Ancient Northeast Asians. The remainder of the Bashkirs ancestry was linked to West Eurasian, primarily European sources. The results point to admixture between local Indo-European-speakers, Uralic-speakers and Turkic-speakers. The admixture event dates to the 13th century, according to an analysis of the identical-by-descent segments. According to the authors, the admixture thus occurred after the presumed migrations of the ancestral Kipchaks from the Irtysh and Ob regions in the 11th century.

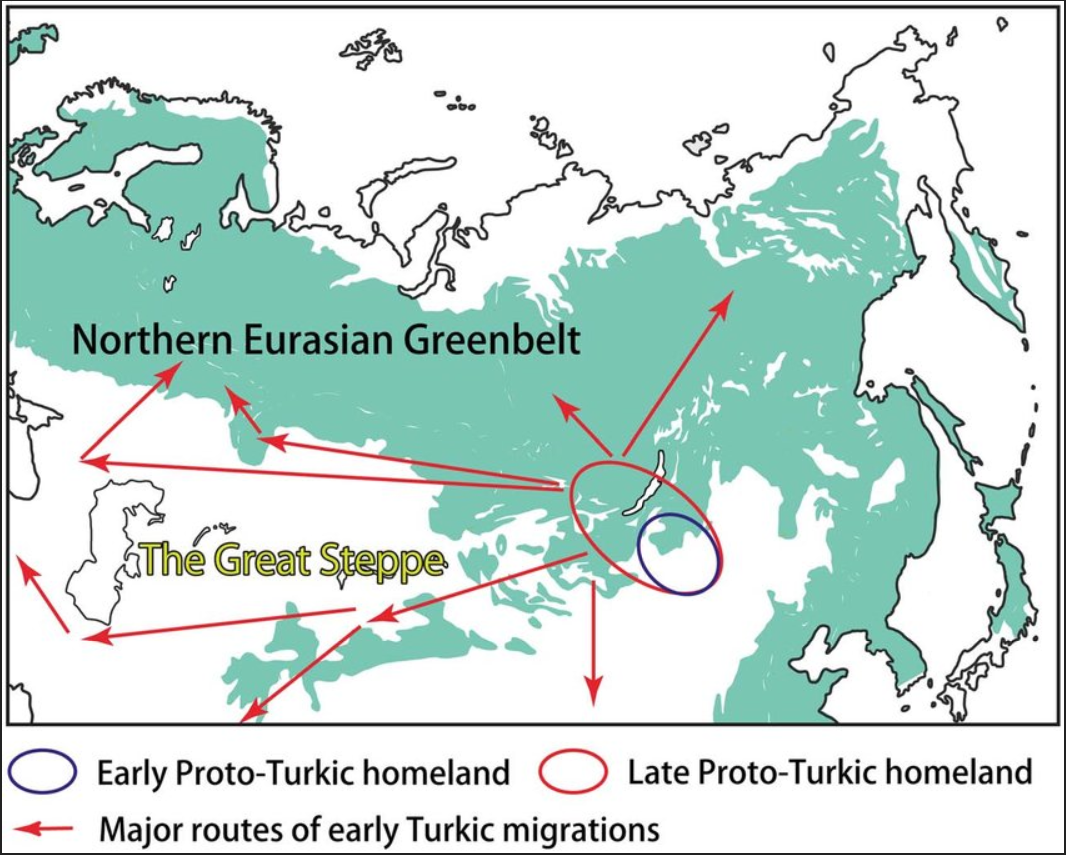
The origin and later expansion of the Turkic peoples from Uchiyama et al. 2020 "the ultimate Proto-Turkic homeland may have been located in a more compact area, most likely in Eastern Mongolia, that is, close to the ultimate Proto-Mongolic homeland in Southern Manchuria and the ultimate Proto-Tungusic homeland in the present-day borderlands of China, Russia and North Korea. This hypothesis would explain the tight connections of Proto-Turkic with Proto-Mongolic and Proto-Tungusic, regardless of whether one interprets the numerous similarities between the three Altaic families as partly inherited or obtained owing to long-lasting contact."

A full genome study by Triska et al. 2017 found that the Bashkir genepool is best described as a multi-layered amalgamation of Turkic, Uralic, and Indo-European contributions. They further argue that "this disparity between cultural and genetic affinities of Tatar and Bashkir can be attributed to a phenomenon of cultural dominance: the population ancestral to Bashkir adopted the Turkic language during Turkic expansion from the east (language replacement event)".

A genetic analysis on genetic data of Hun, Avar and Magyar conqueror samples by Maroti et al. 2022, revealed high genetic affinity between Magyar conquerors and modern day Volga Tatars and Bashkirs. They can be modeled as ~50% Mansi-like, ~35% Sarmatian-like, and ~15% Hun/Xiongnu-like. The admixture event is suggested to have taken place in the Southern Ural region at 643–431 BC.

== Language ==
Bashkir language is a Turkic language of the Kipchak group. It has three main dialects: Southern, Eastern and North-Western located in the territory of historical Bashkortostan.

The Russian census of 2010 recorded 1,152,404 Bashkir speakers in the Russian Federation. The Bashkir language is native to 1,133,339 Bashkirs (71.7% of the total number of Bashkirs, reporting mother tongue). The Tatar language was reported as the native tongue of 230,846 Bashkirs (14.6%), and Russian as the native tongue of 216,066 Bashkirs (13.7%). Most Bashkirs are bilingual in Bashkir and Russian.

The first appearance of a "Bashkir" language is dated back to the 9th century AD, in the form of stone inscription using a Runic alphabet, most likely, this alphabet derives from the Yenisei variant of the old Turkic runic script. This archaic version of a Bashkir language would be more or less a dialect of the proto-Kipchak language, however, since then, the Bashkir language has been through a series of vowel and consonant shifts, which are a result of a common literary history shared with the Idel Tatar language since the formation of the Cuman-Kipchak confederation, when the Oghuric Volga Bulgars started to receive Kipchak Turkic influence and became the Idel Tatars, most likely between the 10th and 11th centuries.

The Nogai and Karachay-Balkar languages are most likely the closest-sounding extant languages to the extinct Proto-Kipchak Bashkir language.

From an arc of time of roughly 900 years, the Bashkir language and Idel Tatar language, previously being completely different languages, "melded" into a series of dialects of a common "Volga Kipchak" or "Volga Turki" language. The Idel Tatars and Bashkirs are and always were two peoples of completely different origins, cultures and identities, but because of a shared common literary history in an arc of 900 years, the two languages ended up in a common language, spoken in different dialects with features depending on the people which spoke them.

For example, the dialects spoken by Bashkirs, tend to have an accent which mostly resembles other Kipchak languages, like Kyrgyz, Kazakh, Nogai, Karakalpak, and many other languages of the Kipchak sub-group, while the dialects spoken by Idel Tatars, have accents more resembling the original Oghuric Volga-Bulgar language spoken before the Cuman invasion.

At the start of the 20th century, particularly during the Russian Revolution, Bashkortostan and Tatarstan emerged as separate republics, leading to the recognition of Bashkir and Tatar as distinct literary languages. Each was based on the most prominent dialects of the Volga Kipchak language spoken by the Bashkir and Kazan Tatar peoples.

The Bashkir alphabet is the official script used to write Bashkir.

== Demographics ==
The area settled by the Bashkirs according to the national census of 2010.

The ethnic Bashkir population is estimated at 2 million people (2009 SIL Ethnologue). The 2021 Russian census recorded 1,571,879 ethnic Bashkirs in Russia, of which 1,268,806 live in Bashkortostan (31.5% of the total population of the republic).

== Culture ==
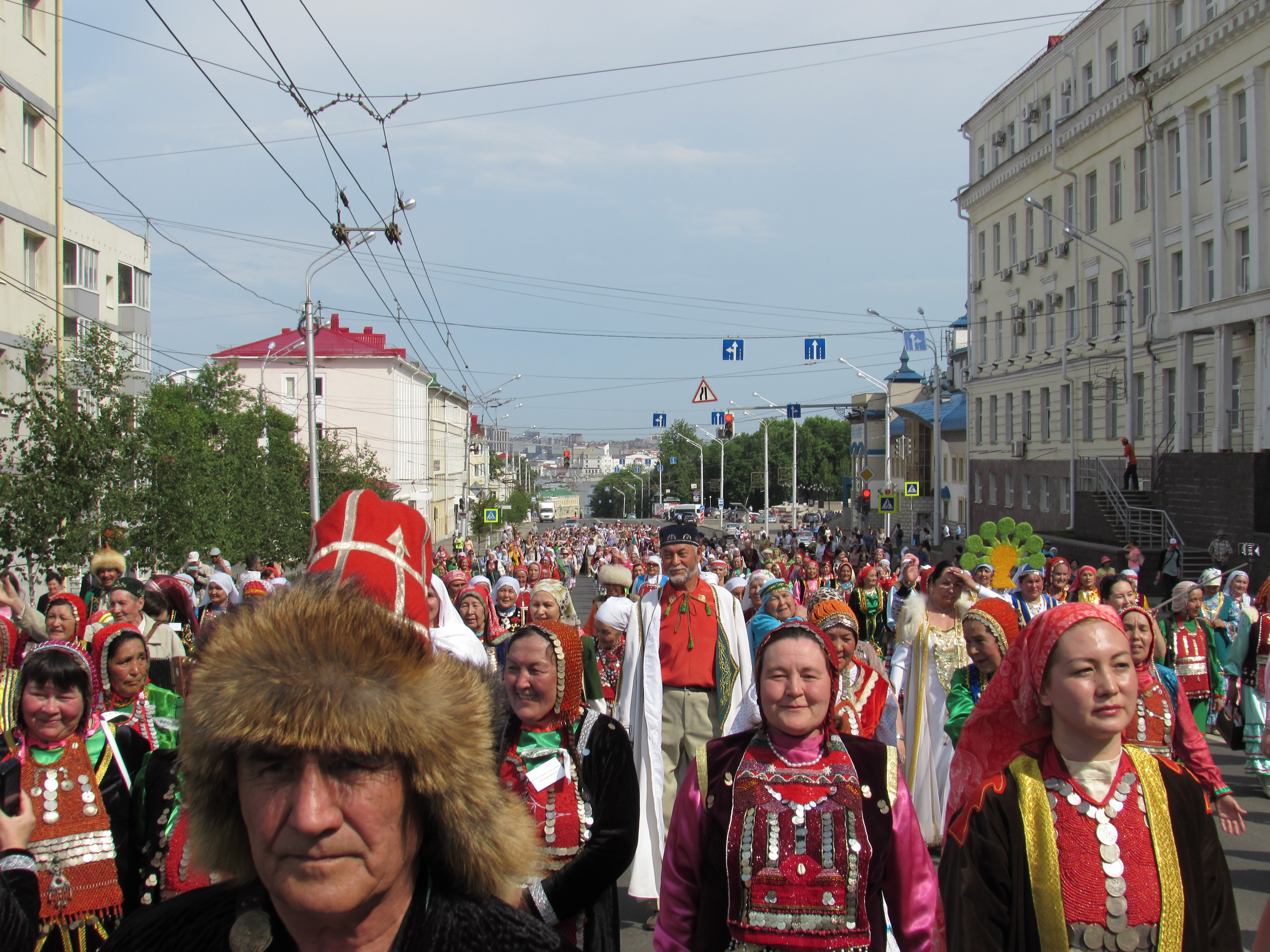
Bashkirs in traditional clothing, Ufa, 2016

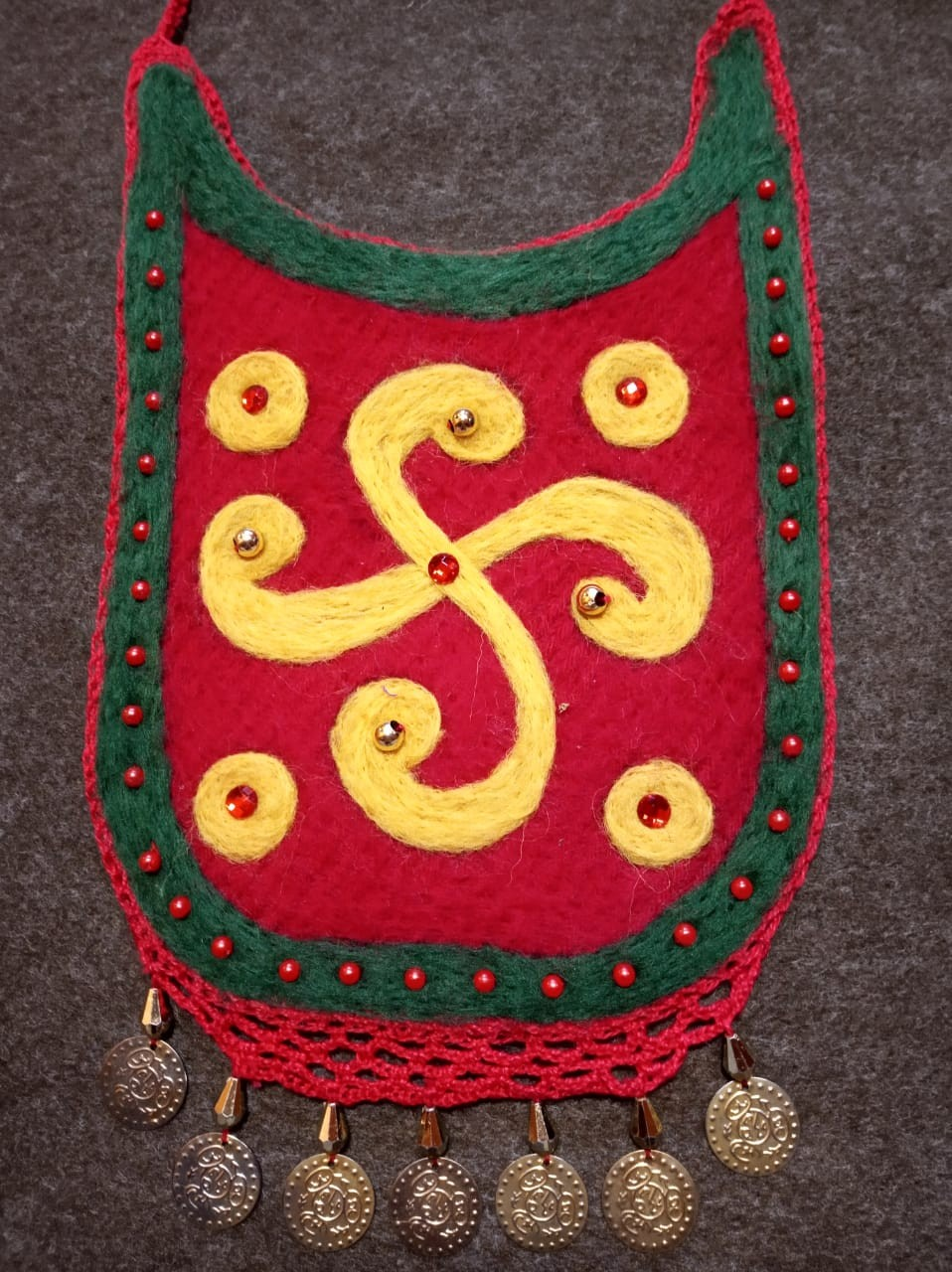
Bashkir embroidery pattern

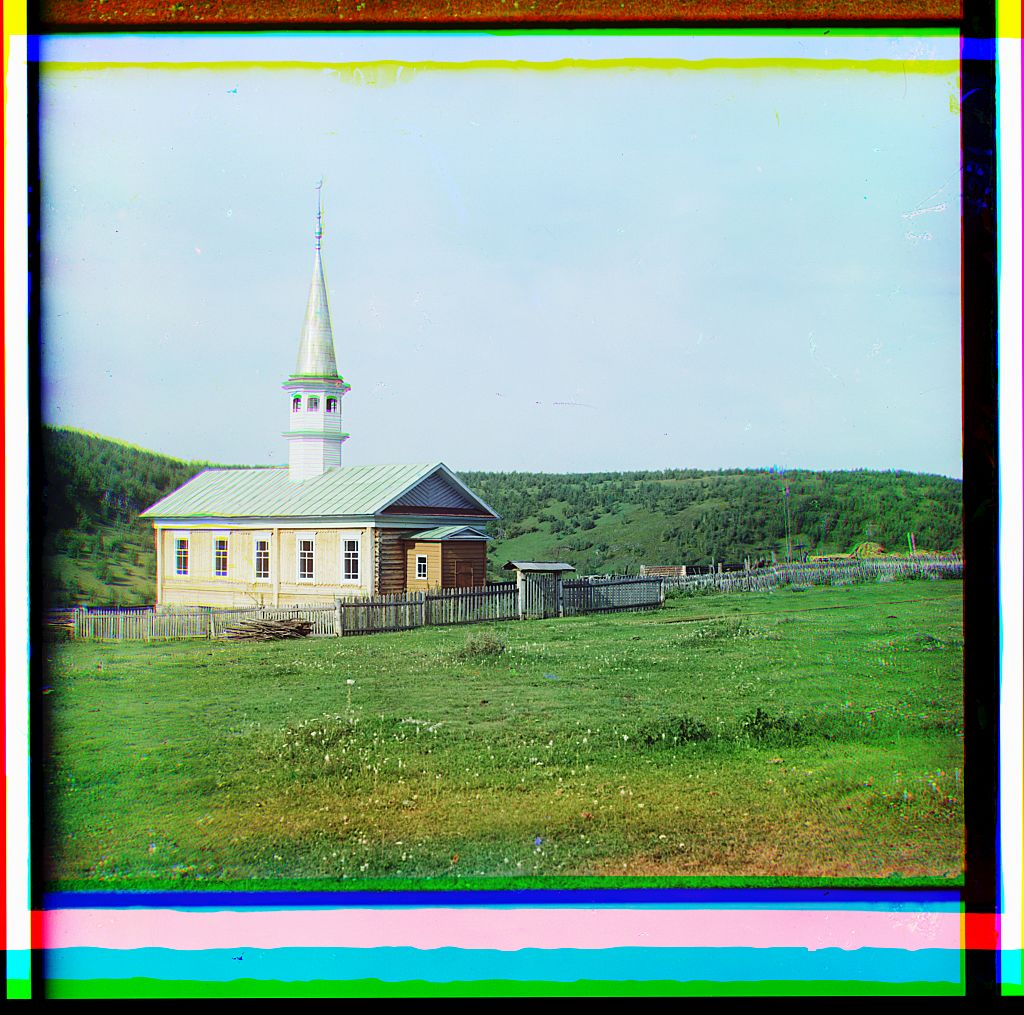
The mosque in the Bashkir village of Yahya. Photo by S.M. Prokudin-Gorskii, 1910

The Bashkirs traditionally practiced agriculture, cattle-rearing and bee-keeping. The half-nomadic Bashkirs travelled through either the mountains or the steppes, herding cattle. Wild-hive beekeeping is another attested tradition, which is practiced in the same Burzyansky District near the Kapova Cave.

Traditional Bashkir dish bishbarmaq is prepared from boiled meat and halma (a type of noodle), sprinkled with herbs and flavored with onions and some qorot (young dry cheese). Dairy is another notable feature of the Bashkir cuisine: dishes are often served with dairy products, and few celebrations occur without the serving of qorot or qaymaq (sour cream).

=== Epic poems and mythology ===
The Bashkirs have a rich folklore referencing the genesis and early history of the people. Through the works of their oral folk art, the views of ancient Bashkirs on nature, their wisdom, psychology, and moral ideals are preserved. The genre composition of the Bashkir oral tradition is diverse: epic and fairy tales, legends and traditions, riddles, songs (ritual, epic or lyrical), etc.

The Bashkir poems, like the epic creations of other peoples, find origin in the ancient Turkic mythology, in fact the Bashkir epic tale culture can be considered a more developed and expanded version of old Turkic epic culture. Majority of the poems of Bashkir mythology have been written down and published as books at the beginning of the 20th century, these poems compose a great part of the literature of the Bashkir people and are important examples of further-developed Turkic culture.

Some of these poems became important on a continental level, for example the epic poem the "Ural Batyr", which tells the tale of the legendary hero Ural, is the origin of the name of the Ural mountains. Other poems constitute a great part of the Bashkir national identity, other tales apart from the Ural Batyr include "Aqbuzat", "Qara yurga", "Aqhaq qola", "Kongur buga", and "Uzaq Tuzaq".

=== The Ural-Batyr and its impact ===
The poem Ural Batyr is an epic which includes deities of the Tengrist pantheon. It takes basis on the pre-Islamic Bashkir conception of the world. In the Ural Batyr the world is three-tiered. It includes a heavenly, earthly and underworld (underwater) trinity: in the sky, the heavenly king Samrau resides, his wives are the Sun and the Moon, he has two daughters, Umay and Aikhylu, who are incarnated either in the form of birds or beautiful girls. In the Ural Batyr, Umay is incarnated into a swan and later assumes the aspect of a beautiful girl as the story proceeds.

People live on the earth, the best of whom pledge honor and respect to the existence of nature. The third world is the underground world, where the Devas (also singular Deva or Div) live, incarnated as a snake, the incarnation of the dark forces, who live underground. Through the actions and divisions of the world related in the Ural Batyr, the Bashkirs express a manichaean view of good and evil. The legendary hero Ural, possessing titanic power, overcoming incredible difficulties, destroys the deva, and obtains "living water" (the idea of water in nature, in the pre-Islamic Bashkir pantheon of the Turkic mythology, is considered a spirit of life).

Ural thus obtains the "living water" in order to defeat death in the name of the eternal existence of man and nature. Ural does not drink the "living water" to live eternally. Instead, he decides to sparkle it around himself, to die and donate eternity to the world, the withered earth turning green. Ural dies and from his body emerge the Ural Mountains; the name of the Ural mountain range comes from this poem.

=== Music ===
The Bashkirs have a style of overtone singing called özläü (sometimes spelled uzlyau; Bashkort Өзләү), which has nearly died out. In addition, Bashkorts also sing uzlyau while playing the kurai, a national instrument. This technique of vocalizing into a flute can also be found in folk music as far west as the Balkans and Hungary.

=== Mentality ===
The Bashkirs give rise to the following essential characteristics of the Bashkir mentality: philosophical, poetic thinking, hospitality and courage, serenity, simplicity, modesty, tolerance, pride, a keen sense of justice and competitiveness. The fundamental value of the Bashkir mentality is humanism, it is this idea that runs through the entire axis of the culture of the people.

== Religion ==
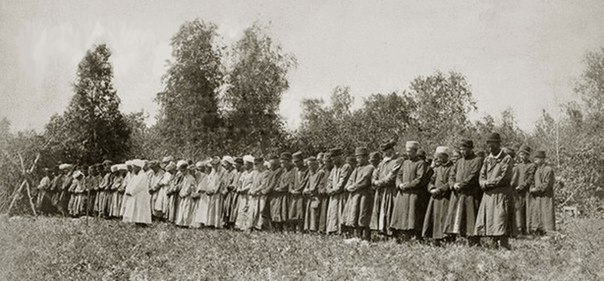
Bashkirs in the midday prayer in the vicinity of the village Muldakaevo. Photo by Maxim Dmitriev, 1890

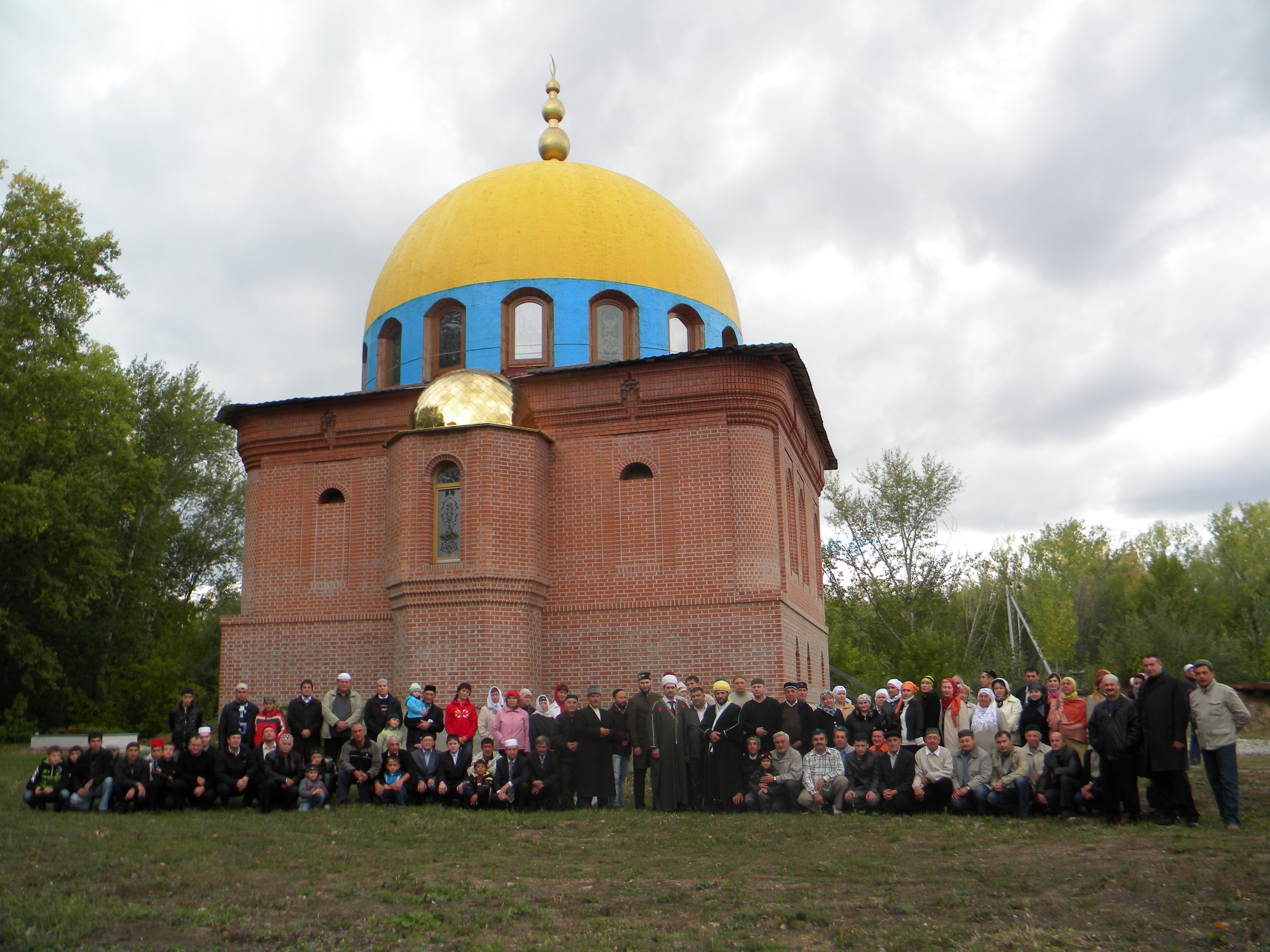
Mosque of Twenty-Five Prophets in Ufa, Bashkortostan

In the pre-Islamic period the Bashkirs practised animism and shamanism, and incorporated the cosmogony of Tengrism.

Bashkirs began converting to Islam in the 10th century. Arab traveler Ibn Fadlan in 921 met some of the Bashkirs, who were already Muslims. The final assertion of Islam among the Bashkirs occurred in the 1320s and 1330s during the Golden Horde period. The Mausoleum of Hussein-Bek, burial place of the first Imam of historical Bashkortostan, is preserved in contemporary Bashkortostan. The mausoleum is a 14th-century building. Catherine the Great established the Orenburg Mohammedan Spiritual Assembly in 1788 in Ufa, which was the first Muslim administrative center in Russia.

Religious revival among the Bashkirs began in the early 1990s. According to Talgat Tadzhuddin there were more than 1,000 mosques in Bashkortostan in 2010.

The Bashkirs are predominantly Sunni Muslims of the Hanafi madhhab.

== Notable Bashkirs ==
- See list of Bashkirs

== See also ==
- Bashkir horse
- Karayakupovo culture
- National Liberation Struggle of the Bashkir People
