= Badzhgard =

Historical area in the Ural Mountains

A map of Smaller Bashkiria in 1919

A map of Greater Bashkiria in 1922

Badzhgard or Bashkurd, historically Bashkiria (Bashkir: Башҡортостан/Başqurtustan) is a historical and geographical region in the Urals, the traditional border between Northern Asia and Eastern Europe in modern Russia, inhabited by the Bashkirs. Today, the territory is administratively split between the Republic of Bashkortostan, Orenburg and Chelyabinsk oblasts, parts of the Republic of Tatarstan, the south-eastern part of Udmurtia, the southern part of the Perm Krai, the south-western part of the Sverdlovsk oblast, the western part of the Kurgan, the north-eastern part of Samara, the eastern part of the Saratov regions.

Various other names have been applied to the region throughout its history, including: Bashgurd, Bashgird, Baskardiya, Bashkyrd, Bashdzhard, Pascatir, Bashirdi etc. The reference area titled "Bashgurd" is found in the Fazalallah Rashid ad-Din (14th century), described as an "Oghuz name".
