= Bashkir rebellion of 1735–1740 =

Rebellion in the Russian Empire

Bashkir rebellion
| Date | July 1735 – 1740 |
| Location | Mainly Bashkortostan, Russian Empire |
| Result | Russian victory: Rebellion crushed; Baskhir genocide |

Belligerents
| Russian Empire | Bashkir rebels |

Commanders and leaders
| (Russian Empire) Ivan Kirillov | Karasakal; Akai Kusyumov (POW); Kilmyak Nurushev (POW); Bepenya Toropberdin (executed); Mandar Karabaev (executed); Tyulkuchura Aldagulov (executed); Aldar Isyangildin (POW) (executed); Yuldash Suyarembetov (executed); Sultanmurat Dyusekeyev (executed) |

Strength
| (Russia) 22,000 regular army and cossacks (February 1736) | Unknown several tens of thousands |

Casualties and losses
| (Russia) Unknown | 45,000–60,000 killed and captured 1,175 Bashkir villages destroyed |

The Bashkir rebellion of 1735–1740 refers to a rebellion by the Bashkirs against the Russian Empire. It started in 1735, but was put down by Russian troops in 1740 after a series of heavy clashes.

== Background ==
From at least the time of Peter the Great, there had been talks of Russia pushing southeast toward Persia and India. In 1734, a so-called Orenburg Expedition (later called Commission) was appointed under the command of Ivan Kirillov, a Russian commander, with an instruction from the Governing Senate to build a fort at the confluence of the Or River and the Ural River, to be called Orenburg, southeast of the Urals where the Bashkir, Kalmyk, and Kazakh lands join. Construction was started at Orsk in 1735, but was moved downstreams in 1739 and to its present location in 1742, but by 1743 Orenburg was moved about 250 kilometres (160 mi) west to its present location. The next planned step was to build a fort on the Aral Sea. This would involve crossing the Bashkir country and then the lands of the Kazakh Lesser Horde, some of whom had recently offered a nominal submission. However, a significant portion of the Bashkir population resented this plan.

== Rebellion ==
Kirillov's plan was approved on May 1, 1734 and he was placed in command. He was warned that this would provoke a Bashkir rebellion, but the warnings were ignored. He left Ufa with 2,500 men in 1735 and fighting started on July 1. The war consisted of many small raids and complex troop movements.

In the spring of 1736, Kirillov burned 200 Bashkir villages, killed 700 rebels in battle and executed 158. An expedition of 773 men left Orenburg in November and lost 500 from cold and hunger. During the time, the Bashkir rebels planned to massacre the sleeping Russians at Seiantusa. The ambush failed. In retaliation, one thousand villagers, including women and children, were put to the sword and another 500 driven into a storehouse and burned to death. Raiding parties then went out and burned about 50 villages and killed another 2,000. Eight thousand Bashkirs attacked a Russian camp and killed 158, losing 40 killed and three prisoners who were promptly hanged. Bashkir rebels also attacked Bashkirs loyal to Russia. The number of Bashkirs loyal to Russia was small and amounted to approximately 150. Leaders who submitted were sometimes fined one horse per household and sometimes hanged.

All this was at the time of Empress Anna of Russia and the Russo-Turkish War (1735–1739). The rebellion was finally put down in 1740.

== Aftermath ==
Although the Bashkir rebellion cannot be easily summarized, the effects include:

- Russian imperial goal of expansion into Central Asia was delayed due to the rebellion.
- Bashkiria (Bashkir country) was "pacified" in 1740.
- Orenburg was established.
- The southern side of Bashkiria was fenced off by the Orenburg Line of forts. It ran from Samara on the Volga east up the Samara River to its headwaters, crossed to the middle Ural River and followed it east and then north on the east side of the Urals and went east down the Uy River to Ust-Uisk on the Tobol River where it connected to the ill-defined "Siberian Line" along the forest-steppe boundary.
- In 1740 a report was made of Bashkir losses during the rebellion. According to the report, 16,893 Bashkir rebels were killed, 3,236 were captured and forcibly conscripted (they were sent to Baltic regiments and fleet), and a further 8,382 women and children were distributed (presumably as serfs), putting the total Bashkir losses at 28,511. Moreover, 12,283 horses, 6,076 cattle and sheep and 9,828 rubles were extracted from the rebellious Bashkirs as fines. Furthermore, at least 1,175 Bashkir villages were destroyed. As this was compiled from army reports, it excludes losses from irregular raiding, hunger, disease and cold. All this was from an estimated Bashkir population of 100,000.
- According to Vasily Tatishchev total losses among Bashkirs amounted to 60,000.

== See also ==
- Bashkir rebellion (1662–64)
- Bashkir rebellion (1704–11)
