= Khasbulat Bamatov =

Senior Prince of Chechnya
- Reign: 1728 – July 7th, 1732
- Predecessor: Amirkhamza Turlov
- Successor: Aidemir Bardykhanov
- Died: July 7th, 1732; Chechen–Aul
- Spouse: Khanza Bardykhanova
- Dynasty: Turlov
- Father: Muhammad Turlov
- Religion: Islam

Khasbulat Bamatov, Kazbulat Bammatov or Khasbulat Turlov, (Note: Also spelled: Kazpulat Bammatov; He was known as Kambulat in Russian documents.) was a prince from the Turlov dynasty and the Senior Prince of the Chechen Principality from 1728 to his death during the Battle of Chechen–Aul on July 7, 1732. He was succeeded by his rival, Aidemir Bardykhanov. Khasbulat was known for his pro–Russian administration, unlike his predecessors and successor.

== Reign ==
Khasbulat's reign as Senior Prince of Chechnya begins in 1728 with the retirement of Amirkhamza Turlov, the previous Senior prince. According to the "Register of Mountain owners 1732", during his reign, the principality was made up of at least 9 major towns — The capital, Chechen–Aul, and also Aldy, Starye Atagi, Bashin–Bakha–Aul, Gadzhi–Aul, Chakhkeri, Astankul and Syuir–Kort and Khambat–Aul. Separate sources also mention other towns, such as Shali, Germenchuk, Topli, Mayrtup, Gekhi, Bolshaya Atagi and others.

Khasbulat adhered to a pro–Russian administration, unlike his predecessor, Amirkhamza Turlov, who participated in anti–Russian movements. For most of his reign, Khasbulat was mainly seated in the Holy Cross fortress and participated in Russian politics in the Caucasus. As a result, when in 1732, riots in Chechnya broke out against the Russian Empire and an army led by Gustaf Otto Douglas was sent to deal with the rebels, Khasbulat acted as a guide. Among the influential princes in Chechnya was Aidemir Bardykhanov, with whom Khasbulat was at enmity with. Wanting to expel him from Chechnya, Khasbulat led a 500 strong detachment led by Colonel Kokhk into Chechen–Aul, which later got encircled in a dense forest by Aidemir's fighters and destroyed. Khasbulat, together with 125 Russian soldiers were killed, and another 75 wounded. Aidemir succeeded Khasbulat as new Senior Prince.

== Family ==
Khasbulat's father, Muhammad Turlov, was one of the previous Senior Princes of the Chechen Principality, who also had another son, Khasbulat's brother, Khastam.
Khasbulat was married to Khanza Bardykhanova, the sister of Aidemir Bardykhanov and daughter of Bartikhan Turlov. With her, Khasbulat had 3 sons — Alibek Khasbulatov, who would become the ruler of Topli from 1732 onwards and the Senior Prince of Chechnya following Aidemir's death in 1746 until his resigning in 1757, Alisultan Khasbulatov, who would also become the Senior Prince and start the 1770 Insurgency in Chechnya, and Muhammad. (Note: Known in Russian documents as Bammad)

== Chronology ==
List on the major events in Khasbulat's life:

- 1708: Death of Khasbulat's father, Muhammad Turlov.
- 1728: Khasbulat becomes Senior Prince of the Chechen Principality.
- 1732: 1732 Insurgency in Chechnya.
- July 7, 1732: Battle of Chechen–Aul: Death of Khasbulat, defeat of the Russian detachment (500 strong). 125 Russians killed, 75 wounded.
- Late 1732: Alibek Khasbulatov invades and raids the Chechen principality as revenge for his fathers death.

== See also ==
- Muhammad Turlov — Father and one of the previous Senior Prince of Chechnya
- Amirkhamza Turlov — Predecessor of Khasbulat
- Battle of Chechen–Aul — Battle in which Khasbulat was killed
- Aidemir Bardykhanov — Rival and successor of Khasbulat
- Alibek Khasbulatov — Son and successor of Khasbulat
- Alisultan Khasbulatov — Son and successor of Khasbulat
