= Turlov =

Turlov is the Russian-language surname associated with the princely Chechen Turlov family of unclear origin. Notable people with the surname include:

- Amirkhamza Turlov, 18th century Chechen prince
- Muhammad Turlov, 17th century Chechen prince
- Timur Turlov (born 1987), Russian-born Kazakhstani businessman
- Tururav II Turlov, 17th century Chechen prince
