= Insurgency in Chechnya =

The Insurgency in Chechnya may refer to:

- Insurgency in Chechnya (1708), failed uprising by North Caucasians under the leadership of Murat Kuchukov
- Insurgency in Chechnya (1722), punitive Russian campaign against the Chechens and Endirey Khanate
- Insurgency in Chechnya (1732), successful Chechen ambush on Russian army
- Insurgency in Chechnya (1940–1944), failed Chechen uprising against the Soviet Union
