= Siege of Menzelinsk (1682) =

Battle in Russia

- Part of Bashkir rebellion of 1681–1684
Date	July 1682
Location	Menzelinsk
Result	Bashkir–Kalmyk victory

Belligerents
Kalmyk Khanate; Bashkir rebels	Tsardom of Russia

Commanders and leaders
Ayuka	Unknown

Strength
40,000 kalmyk 10,000 Bashkir	Unknown

Casualties and losses
Unknown	Unknown

The Siege of Menzelinsk was a 1682 battle between the Tsardom of Russia against the Kalmyk Khanate and Bashkir rebels.

== Course of hostilities ==
The rebels established a connection with the Kalmyk khan Ayuka. In July 1682, 40000 Kalmyk detachments arrived in Bashkortostan. The uprising resumed and the Bashkirs and Kalmyks besieged Menzelinsk.

== See also ==
- Bashkir rebellion of 1681–1684
