= Battle of Terki (1708) =

1708 conflict at Terki Fortress

- Part of Murat Kuchukov Movement
Date	12–26 February 1708
Location	Terki Fortress, Russia (Modern–day Kizlyar District, Dagestan, Russia)
Result	Russian victory: Decline of insurgency
Territorial changes	Rebels have been repelled from the Terki

Belligerents
Murat Kuchukov's forces: Aukhs; Braguny Khanate; Endirey Khanate; Aksai Khanate; Nogais; Other North Caucasian peoples	Tsardom of Russia: Kalmyk Khanate

Commanders and leaders
Murat Kuchukov (POW) (executed); Amirkhamza Turlov; Saltan–beg of Braguny †; Chopan–Shavkhal of Endirey; Soltan–Makhmud of Aksai	(Tsardom of Russia) Fyodor Apraksin; Ayuka Khan

Strength
c. 3,000–4,000	4,200: (Tsardom of Russia) 1,200; 3,000

Casualties and losses
Heavy	Unknown 7 copper cannons 3 cast-iron cannons

The Battle of Terki in 1708 was the successful storming of the Terki fortress by Chechen and other North Caucasian rebels, and the subsequent recapture by Russian and Kalmyk forces following a counter-offensive led by Fyodor Apraksin and Ayuka Khan. The leader of the rebel army, Murat Kuchukov, was wounded, captured, and eventually executed.

== History ==
In 1708, the teachings and propaganda of Murat Kuchukov led to an uprising of the North Caucasians against Russia. Raids by the mountaineers on the Russian fortification of Terki began increasing and in February of the same year, having gathered 1,500 to 1,600+ fighters, Kuchukov invaded the city, aiming to break through the Russian border and march to Bashkiria, where he planned to join the Bashkir rebels.

On February 12, 1708, the rebels launched an attack on the city. The garrison of the city was poorly equipped and prepared, and its soldiers were outnumbered by the forces of Murat. The attack ended by 4 o'clock in the afternoon and resulted in a major victory for the mountaineers, who established control over most of the city. During the battle and after it, many fortifications and administrative buildings were burned and destroyed. The defenders suffered heavy casualties, with most being either killed or captured. The attackers also captured 10 cannons. However, there were parts of the city which the rebels failed to capture.

The Russian side hastily began a counter offensive. Fyodor Apraksin, with a detachment 1,200 strong, together with his ally Ayuka Khan of the Kalmyk Khanate, who commanded an army 3,000 strong, invaded the city and scored a decisive victory over the mountaineers on February 26, which forced the latter to retreat.

Meanwhile, Murat Kuchukov was captured and brought in front of the tsar, Peter the Great, who sentenced him to death. He was hanged in Kazan the same year.
