= Bashin–Bakha–Aul =

Historical town in Chechnya

- Башин–Баха–Аул (Russian)

Bashin–Bakha–Aul (Note: Russian: Башин–Баха–Аул, romanized: Bashin–Bakha–Aul) was a historical village in Chechnya, located in the Southeast of the modern–day Grozny district. It was, according to the Register for Mountain owners (1732), one of the main 9 towns that made up the Turlov Principality, the remaining being: Chechen–Aul, Chakhkeri, Astankul, Aldy, Starye Atagi, Gadzhi–Aul, Syuir–Kort and Khambat–Aul.
