= Bashkir rebellion of 1681–1684 =

Bashkir rebellion (1681–1684)
Date	1681–1684
Location	On the territory from the middle reaches of the Iset River to the Volga, from the upper reaches of the Yaik River (now the Ural River) up to the middle current Kama and Chusovoy
Result	Bashkir political victory: Meeting the demands of the rebels

Belligerents
Bashkir rebels Kalmyk Khanate (From 1682)	Tsardom of Russia Kalmyk Khanate (From 1683)

Commanders and leaders
Seit Yagafarov	Ayuka Khan

Strength
Unknown	Unknown

Casualties and losses
Unknown	Unknown

The Bashkir rebellion of 1681–1684 (Seit's revolt) was one of the major Bashkir uprisings of the second half of the 17th century.

== Causes ==
The main reason was rooted in the decree issued by the tsarist government (Decree of 16 May 1681), which proclaimed a plan to forcibly Christianize Bashkirs.

== Course of hostilities ==
The main forces of the rebels: Bashkirs, led by a Bashkirs from a noble family, Seit-batyr. The first actions began in the summer of 1681 in Nogai and Siberian darugah. In the spring of 1682, a mass struggle unfolded: the rebel Kazan Daruga attacked the Zakamsky fortresses. The main blow in Osinskaya daruga was directed to Kungur, fortresses and villages founded by Stroganovs on Bashkir lands.

Numerous rebel detachment besieged Ufa, took Krasny Yar, Lovashnoye and others, in the west — Piyaniy bor, Karakulino and other objects. By May, the uprising had engulfed the entire region. Unsuccessful attempts to suppress the uprising forced the government to appeal to the Bashkirs with a promise to cancel the decree and forgive all participants in the uprising. Some of the rebels, led by Kuchuk Yulaev, stopped fighting and appealed to the government with a petition, while the other part, led by Seit, continued the struggle.

The rebels established a connection with the Kalmyk taisha Ayuka. In July 1682, Kalmyk detachments arrived in Bashkortostan. The uprising resumed. Bashkirs and Kalmyks besieged Ufa and Menzelinsk, prisons, settlements and villages built on Bashkir lands were attacked. To break the alliance of the Bashkirs with the Kalmyks, the government began negotiations with Ayuka and in early 1683 achieved his refusal to support the uprising. But the struggle continued: in the spring and summer of 1683, the rebels attacked the Zakamsky fortresses, burned the Ascension Monastery, besieged the Salt Town, Menzelinsk and other settlements. Troops under the command of Yu. S. were assembled to suppress the uprising. Urusova. Kalmyk taisha Ayuka with a detachment of 40 thousand people invaded the borders of Bashkortostan to force the Bashkirs to secede from Russia and come under his rule by cruel measures. The cruelty of the Kalmyks forced the Bashkir rebels to stop fighting against the Russian Kingdom. This was also facilitated by the statement of the tsarist government that it had never issued a decree on the forced baptism of Muslims.

== Literature ==
Акманов И. Г. Башкирские восстания XVII – XVIII вв. — феномен в истории народов Евразии. — Уфа: Китап, 2016. — С. 60–61. — 376 с. — ISBN 978-5-295-06448-7.

== Links ==
- БАШКИРСКИЕ ВОССТАНИЯ 17–18 вв // Башкортостан: краткая энциклопед
- Вожди башкирских восстаний 17–18 век.
