= Murat Kuchukov =

Sultan Murat Kuchukov
- Died: 1708 Kazan
- Allegiance: Chechen-Aul
- Known for: Islamic preacher, starting the 1708 Insurgency in Chechnya
- Wars/Battles: Bashkir rebellion of 1704–1711 Insurgency in Chechnya (1708): Battle of Terki

"Sultan" Murat Kuchukov was a Bashkir Islamic preacher and military commander, known for participating in the 1704–1711 Bashkir rebellion and starting the 1708 Insurgency in Chechnya.
He was descendant of Genghis Khan and due to his knowledge on the dogmas of Islam, he earned himself the nickname "Saint of the Mohammedan law".

== Early life ==
Only basic info is known about Murat's biography, especially his early life. He is a descendant of Genghis Khan and his paternal ancestors were rulers of the Karakalpak Khanate.
In his youth, he was in honorary captivity of the Kalmyk Khan Ayuka, from where he eventually passed to the Bashkirs, who rebelled against the Russian Empire in 1704. He participated in the rebellion until his death in 1708.
Murat was also a feudal lord of Ufa.

== As Embassador and life in Chechnya ==
In 1707, the headquarters of the rebels sent him, along with a group of other Bashkirs as an embassy to Istanbul to ask for help from the Ottoman sultan. Unsuccessful however, the embassy returned to Bashkiria through the North Caucasus.
In November 1707, he met with the Chechen prince Amirkhamza Turlov, future ruler of the Chechen Principality, where he stayed, as an Islamic preacher. Because of his knowledge on the Islamic faith, he got declared a "Saint of the Mohammedan law". Soon, Nogais and Kumyks began reaching out to him.

== 1708 Insurgency in Chechnya ==
Due to the propaganda by Murat Kuchukov, who became popular in the Northeast Caucasus, influential North Caucasian peoples, especially the Aukhs, began revolting against the local princes and Tsarist administration. All of the rebellious peoples were united by the teachings of Murat Kuchukov.

Soon, Murat gathered some 1,500+ fighters and successfully stormed and took over most of the Terek fortress. Heavy Russian and Kalmyk reinforcements soon arrived however, and decisively defeated the rebel forces, wounding and capturing Murat in late February 1708.

Murat was brought to Kazan, where, on the personal orders of Peter I, he was sentenced to death and soon after, executed by hanging on a hook.

== See also ==
- Insurgency in Chechnya (1708)
- Battle of Terki
- Amirkhamza Turlov
