= Murat Kuchukov Movement =

- Part of Chechen–Russian conflict
Date	1707–1708
Location	Chechnya and Russia
Result	Russian–Kalmyk victory; Capture and execution of Murat Kuchukov

Belligerents
Murat Kuchukov's forces: Aukhs; Braguny Khanate; Endirey Khanate; Aksai Khanate; Nogais; Other North Caucasian peoples	Tsardom of Russia Kalmyk Khanate

Commanders and leaders
Murat Kuchukov (POW) (executed); Amirkhamza Turlov; Saltan–beg of Braguny †; Chopan–Shavkhal of Endirey; Soltan–Makhmud of Aksai	(Tsardom of Russia) Voivode Velyaminov (Tsardom of Russia) Fyodor Apraksin; Ayuka Khan

Strength
1,600+	(Tsardom of Russia) 3,850 8,000; Total: 11,850

Casualties and losses
Heavy	Unknown

The Murat Kuchukov Movement, also known as the 1708 Insurgency in Chechnya or the 1708 Insurgency in the North Caucasus, was caused by the oppressive policies of Russia towards the North Caucasian peoples as well as the teachings and propaganda of the Islamic preacher and military commander Murat Kuchukov, a Bashkir prince who had previously participated in the Bashkir rebellion of 1704–1711.

Although successful at first, Russian and Kalmyk reinforcements at Terki resulted in the defeat of the rebels and the decline of the insurgency. Murat Kuchukov, who started the insurgency, aimed to break through Russian fortress of Terki, travel North and join the Bashkir rebels, but was wounded, captured and eventually executed following his defeat at Terki.

The insurgency was the first major confrontation between the Chechens and Russia.

== Cause ==
The royal governors, using the important economic and strategic position of the Terek fortress, imposed various taxes and duties on the highlanders and extorted bribes from them. For example, the Chechens who lived in the Terek fortress had to pay a duty when exporting goods to their fellow tribesmen in the rest of Chechnya. These and other extortions from the administration led to the paralysis of economic activity in a significant part of the region.

== Murat Kuchukov ==
Murat Kuchukov was a Bashkir Islamic teacher and military commander from Ufa, who previously took part in the Bashkir rebellion of 1704–1711. During his return from a diplomatic mission in the Ottoman Empire in 1707, he met with the Chechen prince Amirkhamza Turlov in Chechen-Aul, where he decided to stay to preach Islam among the Chechens.

== Insurgency ==
The teachings and propaganda of Murat Kuchukov, who became popular among the North Caucasian peoples, lead to rebellions against Russia and the local princes. Among the rebellious peoples were especially the Aukhs, but also the Aksai, Kumyks, Nogais, the people of Kizlyar, other mountaineer tribes and some Cossacks. The social composition of the rebels also mostly included both poor highlanders and wealthy, who, however, were united by dissatisfaction with the policy of the Russian administration. The rebels were unfamiliar to religious slogans, although they recognized Murat Kuchukov as a Muslim saint.

=== Battle of Terki ===
Soon, under the command of Murat, more than 1,500 to 1,600 armed fighters gathered in order to storm and capture Terki. Aim of the Murat and his attack on the fortress was to break through the Russian defences, travel North, and join the Bashkir rebellion.

The fortress garrison was small and poor equipped, and with that information, Kuchukov successfully stormed and took over most of the fortress on 12 February, 1708. The defenders of Terki suffered heavy losses and were mostly captured and the rebels captured 10 artillery.

The Russian side began to send reinforcements to the defenders of the city. The Kalmyk Khanate under Ayuka Khan did the same, and the new combined army counted 9,850 soldiers. On 26 February, 1708, the defending army inflicted a heavy defeat upon the rebels, who were forced to retreat. Murat Kuchukov himself was wounded and captured, where he was then sentenced to death by hanging.

After the death, the rebels fled South, pursued by Russian troops, who inflicted more losses on them. The defeat at Terki led to the decline of the insurgency.

== See also ==
- Murat Kuchukov
- Battle of Terki
