= Louisa Akavi =

Louisa Akavi is a New Zealand Red Cross nurse and recipient of the rarely awarded Florence Nightingale Medal. Akavi was kidnapped in Syria in October 2013 and subsequently taken hostage by Islamic State forces in May 2014. Akavi's captivity remained a tightly held secret by the New Zealand Government and media for five years. On 15 March 2019, the International Committee of the Red Cross (ICRC) disclosed her identity following the fall of the Islamic State's last stronghold in Syria. New Zealand Foreign Minister Winston Peters has confirmed that the New Zealand Government is still trying to rescue and bring her home.

== Background ==
Louisa Akavi is a New Zealander of Cook Islander descent. She was born in Rarotonga and grew up in Porirua, a large urban area 20 minutes north of the capital, Wellington, New Zealand. Akavi completed her training at Wellington Hospital in 1977 and then worked as a staff nurse for two years. She later traveled to Scotland to do midwifery training and also worked for two years in London. After returning to New Zealand, Akavi worked at Wellington Hospital before joining the New Zealand Red Cross.

After joining the Red Cross, Akavi worked in several countries including Malaysia, Hong Kong, Somalia, the Philippines, Sri Lanka, Pakistan, Afghanistan, Iran, Bosnia, the Solomon Islands, Iraq and Chechnya. While on assignment in Chechnya in 1996, Akavi survived an attack on the ICRC Hospital of Novye Atagi which claimed the lives of six other Red Cross workers including fellow New Zealander Sheryl Thayer. In 1999, Akavi was awarded the Florence Nightingale Medal, the Red Cross' highest honour. In 2003, Akavi went on a Red Cross assignment in Iraq. In 2013, she went on another assignment to Syria during the Syrian Civil War.

== Kidnapping and captivity ==
On 13 October 2013, the then 62-year old Louisa Akavi was part of a Red Cross convoy consisting of seven ICRC workers including two drivers who were kidnapped by armed gunmen near the town of Saraqeb in Syria's Idlib Governorate. While the other hostages were released, Akavi and the two Syrian drivers Alaa Rajab and Nabil Bakdounes were not. As of April 2019, the status and whereabouts of the two Syrian drivers remain unknown. According to The Guardian, Akavi was on her 17th mission with the Red Cross.

The ICRC issued a televised press release but avoided identifying the names and nationalities of the kidnapped workers. The New Zealand Government was made aware of Akavi's kidnapping but did not publicise her case to avoid endangering her and encouraging her captors to issue ransom demands. The then-Foreign Minister Murray McCully also ruled out paying ransom demands, citing New Zealand's policy of not paying ransoms to terrorist groups. According to McCully, the Fifth National Government received no direct communications from her captors. The ICRC also reportedly received a proof of life from Akavi's captors in 2014, which is regarded as a precursor to a ransom. The Red Cross also has a policy of not paying ransoms. It also kept Akavi's captivity a secret in the hope of a "positive outcome."

One of her captors was reportedly Mohammed Emwazi, the British Arab national known as "Jihadi John." Akavi was also reportedly held captive alongside several other Western hostages including the journalists James Foley and Steven Sotloff, and the aid workers David Haines and Kayla Mueller, who were subsequently murdered by their ISIS captors.

Akavi reportedly befriended Mueller while in ISIS captivity but the two were later separated. In July 2014, a failed US operation to rescue both women resulted in ISIS threats to execute both women. While Mueller later died in ISIS captivity, Akavi was reportedly kept alive due to her nursing skills and put to work in an ISIS-controlled hospital by late 2016; making her one of ISIS's longest surviving hostages alongside British journalist John Cantlie and Italian Jesuit priest Paolo Dall'Oglio.

== Rescue attempts ==
According to the New Zealand news media company Stuff, the New Zealand Security Intelligence Service and Government Communications Security Bureau were involved in negotiations about Akavi's release or possible rescue. Stuff also disclosed that the elite New Zealand Special Air Service were deployed in Iraq around 2017 to advise on Akavi's location and movements from intelligence gleaned from both the GCSB and foreign intelligence services and to liaise with Western coalition forces for a possible rescue mission. This mission did not proceed due to a lack of reliable intelligence on her whereabouts.

In February 2019, it was reported that three hostages including a Red Cross worker were being used as bargaining chips by ISIS to secure the safe passage of their fighters following the loss of ISIS territory to Syrian Democratic Forces. Despite reports that Akavi was sighted in the area near Al-Baghuz Fawqani around March 2019, searches turned up empty-handed. By mid-April, Government ministers were informed by New Zealand's intelligence services that her status was "under review"; meaning that they no longer had certainty she was still alive.

== Media coverage and subsequent developments ==
On 15 March, the New Zealand Red Cross's Secretary General, Niamh Lawless broke its silence on Louisa Akavi's captivity, reiterating its call for Akavi's captors to release her and expressing its support for her family. The International Committee of the Red Cross also issued a statement seeking information about the whereabouts of Akavi and two Syrian drivers Alaa Rajab and Nabil Bakdounes, who had been part of the Red Cross convoy. This story was covered by several New Zealand media outlets including Radio New Zealand, Stuff, the New Zealand Herald, and 1News as well as international outlets including the New York Times, The Guardian, ABC News, and the Japan Times.

The New Zealand Foreign Minister Winston Peters has also issued statements that the New Zealand Government is making efforts to rescue Akavi. Both Peters and Prime Minister Jacinda Ardern have criticized the International Committee of the Red Cross' decision to disclose Akavi's identity as reckless and "rolling the dice on people's lives". Ardern has stated that she preferred that such information remain outside the public domain. In response, the International Committee of the Red Cross defended its decision to disclose Akavi's plight, asserting it had done so with the consultation of the New Zealand Government.

Following the death of ISIS leader Abu Bakr al-Baghdadi in a US Delta Force operation in late October 2019, Prime Minister Ardern said that the Government and its Coalition partners had received no information on the whereabouts of Akavi. A senior government source said they had not given up hope she was still alive but admitted that hope was dwindling due to the lack of any new information or positive sightings.
