= Jenny McMahon =

New Zealand nurse and nutritionist (born 1957)

Jenny McMahon ONZM MBE
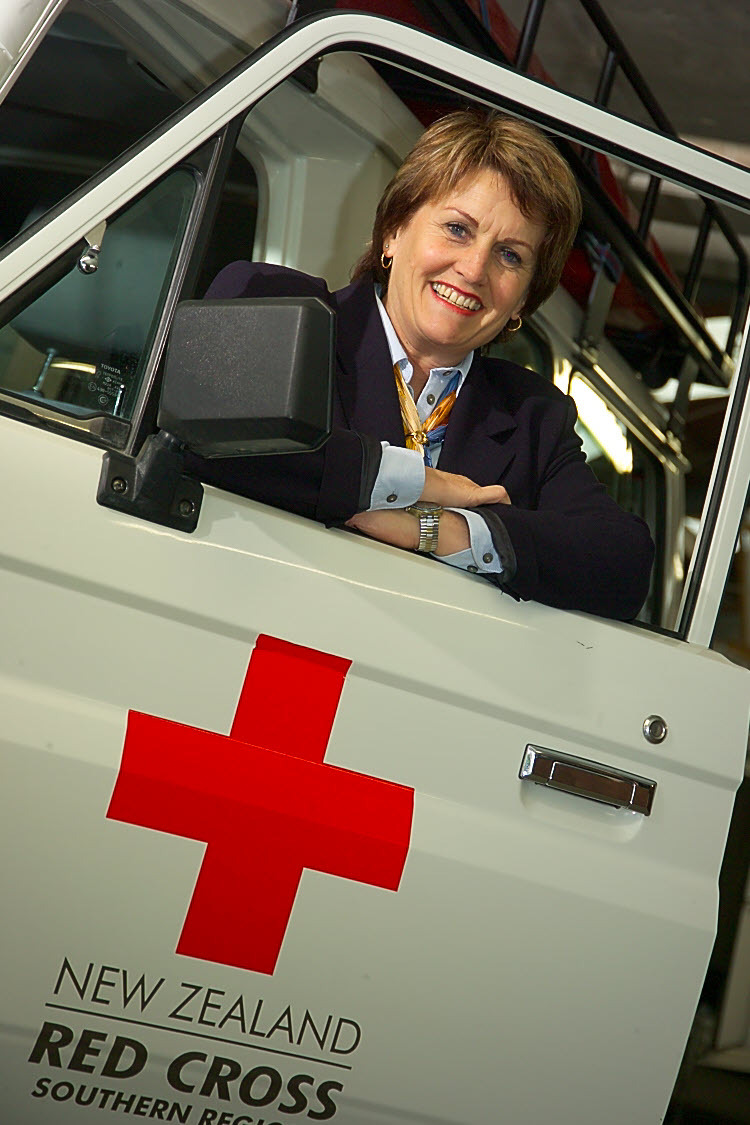
- McMahon, c. 2007

President of New Zealand Red Cross
- In office 2012–2018

Personal details
- Born: Jennifer Anne McMahon; 27 January 1957 (age 69) Hamilton, New Zealand
- Relatives: Brian McMahon (father)
- Education: University of Otago
- Profession: Nurse; nutritionist
- Awards: Florence Nightingale Medal (1991)
- Scientific career
- Thesis: The effect of homocysteine lowering vitamins on cognitive performance in older people : a randomised controlled trial (2005)
- Doctoral advisor: Murray Skeaff

Jennifer Anne McMahon ONZM MBE (born 27 January 1957) is a New Zealand nurse and nutritionist. She was the president of the New Zealand Red Cross Society between 2012 and 2018. In 2018, her contributions to health research and to aiding disadvantaged people internationally were recognised by her appointment as a Companion of the Royal Society Te Apārangi.

== Biography ==
McMahon was born in Hamilton on 27 January 1957, the daughter of Joan Margaret McMahon (née Palmer) and Brian McMahon, a venereologist and army doctor. She grew up in Malaysia, Singapore, England and New Zealand, and was educated at Villa Maria College in Christchurch. After completing her nursing qualification in Dunedin in 1978, she worked on an Aboriginal reserve in the outback of Australia, and in the Torres Strait Islands and North Queensland. Her first posting with New Zealand Red Cross was in 1983 at a refugee camp on the Thai–Kampuchean (now Cambodian) border. She also served the Red Cross in Angola and was subsequently appointed regional nutritionist for Africa for the International Committee of the Red Cross.

On returning to New Zealand, McMahon based herself in Dunedin and serves on the Advisory Committee to the University of Otago's Centre for International Health and as an executive member of the Otago Medical Research Foundation.

McMahon graduated from the University of Otago with a Master of Consumer and Applied Sciences degree in human nutrition in 1991, a Master of Business Administration degree in 2001, and a PhD in human nutrition, supervised by Murray Skeaff in 2006. Her doctoral thesis was titled The effect of homocysteine lowering vitamins on cognitive performance in older people : a randomised controlled trial.

From 2012 until November 2018, McMahon served as president of the New Zealand Red Cross Society.

== Honours and awards ==
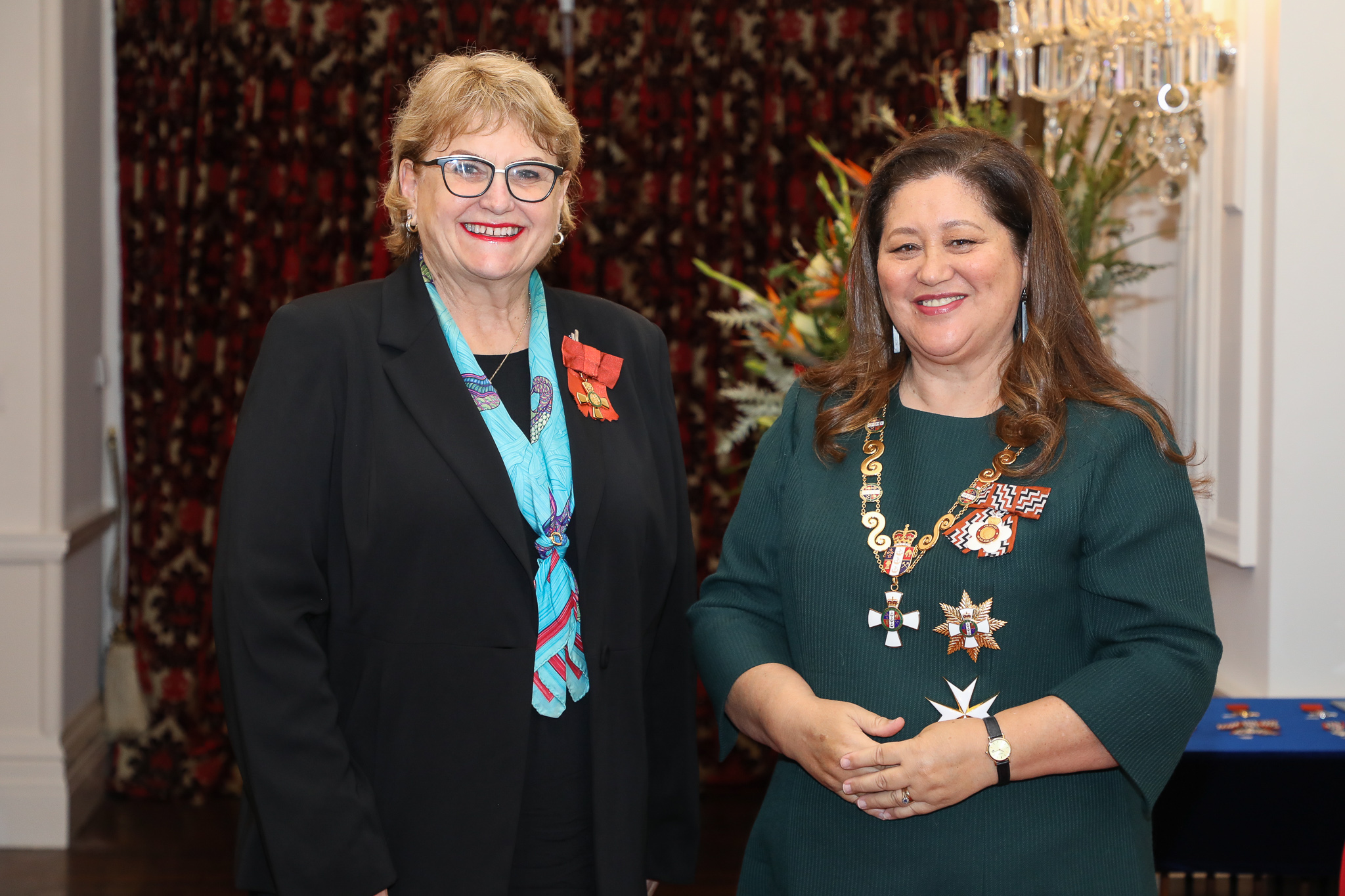
McMahon (left), after her investiture as an Officer of the New Zealand Order of Merit by the governor-general, Dame Cindy Kiro, at Government House, Wellington, on 3 May 2022

In 1989, McMahon received an Outstanding Service Medal from the New Zealand Red Cross, and in 1991 she was awarded the Florence Nightingale Medal. She was appointed a Member of the Order of the British Empire, for services to welfare work, in the 1993 Queen's Birthday Honours, and in the 2019 New Year Honours she was named an Officer of the New Zealand Order of Merit, for services to the Red Cross.

In 2018, McMahon was made a Companion of the Royal Society Te Apārangi, in recognition of her contributions to health research and to aiding disadvantaged populations worldwide.
