= Ayuka =

- Gender: Female
- Language: Japanese

Origin
- Meaning: "walking fragrance" "walking flower" "walking summer"

Ayuka (あゆか) is a feminine Japanese given name. Notable people with the name include:

- a member of Maria (band)
- Ayuka Suzuki, professional Japanese group rhythmic gymnast

== Other people ==
- Ayuka Khan (1669–1724), Kalmyk leader
