= Brian McMahon (New Zealand Army officer) =

New Zealand army officer (1929–2025)

Brian McMahon CBE KStJ
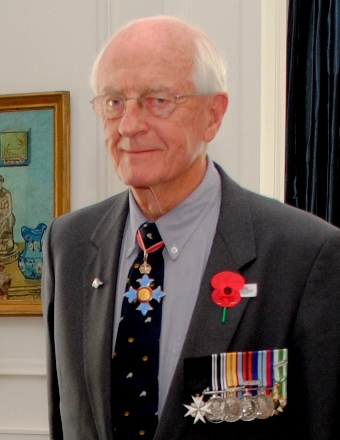
- McMahon in 2011
- Born: Brian Thomas McMahon; 1 December 1929; Dunedin, New Zealand
- Died: 13 March 2025 (aged 95); Dunedin, New Zealand
- Spouse: Joan Margaret Palmer (m. 1956; died 2001)
- Children: 5
- Relatives: Jenny McMahon (daughter)
- Military career
- Branch: New Zealand Army
- Service years: 1966–1983
- Rank: Brigadier
- Conflict: Vietnam War

Brigadier Brian Thomas McMahon CBE KStJ (1 December 1929 – 13 March 2025) was a New Zealand Defence Force officer. He worked as a venereologist before joining the Defence Force and served in the Vietnam War from 1969 to 1970. He also served in the United Kingdom, Malaysia and Singapore. From 1980 to 1983, he was director-general of Defence Force Medical Services. After retiring from the Defence Force, McMahon worked as medical superintendent of the Wakari Hospital and then Dunedin Hospital. In retirement, he carried out charity work, particularly in relation to leprosy. He was given the Royal New Zealand Returned and Services' Association ANZAC of the Year Award in 2011.

== Early life and family ==
Born in Dunedin on 1 December 1929, McMahon was educated at Otago Boys' High School. He went on to study at the University of Otago, graduating MB ChB in 1955. He worked part-time as a venereologist in several New Zealand hospitals from 1953.

In 1956, McMahon married Joan Margaret Palmer. The couple went on to have five children, including Jenny McMahon.

== Military service ==
McMahon began a career in the New Zealand Defence Force in 1966 as resident medical officer at the Waiouru Military Camp. In 1968, he was appointed to run the sexual health services of the Defence Force.

In 1969, McMahon served with the New Zealand forces in the Vietnam War, as part of the 1st New Zealand Services Medical Team. He left Vietnam in 1970, and later served in the United Kingdom, Singapore and Malaysia, the latter occasion as medical officer to the 1st Battalion, Royal New Zealand Infantry Regiment. McMahon was appointed director-general of Defence Force Medical Services in 1980 and retired in 1983. During the same period, McMahon served as Honorary Surgeon to the Queen.

== Later life ==
After leaving the military, McMahon served as medical superintendent of Wakari Hospital and then Dunedin Hospital. He was also medical officer of health in Otago and Southland, and a senior lecturer at Otago Medical School.

In the 1983 Queen's Birthday Honours, McMahon was appointed a Commander of the Order of the British Empire. The same year he became an officer of the Most Venerable Order of the Hospital of St John of Jerusalem, being appointed a commander in the same order in 1985 and a knight in 1990. He was made a Knight Commander of the Order of St Lazarus in 1986.

In retirement, McMahon continued to mentor medical students. He was appointed to the honorary role of colonel commandant of the Royal New Zealand Army Medical Corps in 1992 and held that role until 1995. He was appointed to a second term from 2005 to 2008. McMahon served as life governor of Otago Boys' High School Old Boys' Society from 2000 to 2017 when he voluntarily relinquished the role. In 1998, McMahon returned to Vietnam to reopen a hospital at Bong Son that had been destroyed during the war. During the trip he visited the site where a friend and sergeant had been killed by a land mine in front of McMahon.

McMahon was a member of the Leprosy Trust Board Fiji and regularly visited the South West Pacific and South East Asia on missions with the Pacific Leprosy Foundation. He also helped to raise $3 million for the neurosurgery chair at Dunedin Hospital.

In April 2011, McMahon was awarded the second Royal New Zealand Returned and Services' Association ANZAC of the Year Award, which was presented to him by the governor-general, Sir Anand Satyanand, at Government House, Wellington. He was also appointed the first patron of the University of Otago Medical School Brain Health Research Centre. In 2019, a scholarship was established in McMahon's name for second-year Bachelor of Health Science students at Auckland University of Technology. The $10,000 scholarship was funded by Veterans' Affairs New Zealand and the Ranfurly Veterans Trust, and commemorates New Zealand medical personnel of the Vietnam War.

McMahon's wife, Margaret, died in 2001. McMahon died in Dunedin on 13 March 2025, at the age of 95.
