= ICRC Hospital of Novye Atagi =

Geography
- Location: Novye Atagi, Chechnya, Russia
- Coordinates: 43.136803°N 45.775288°E (Novye Atagi)

History
- Opened: 1996

Links
- Lists: Hospitals in Russia

The ICRC Hospital of Novye Atagi is an International Committee of the Red Cross (ICRC) hospital in Novye Atagi, Chechnya, Russia. It was evacuated in December 1996 when six members of the expatriate team were assassinated during an early morning raid by an unidentified armed group.

The decision to create this hospital was made at the end of the First Chechen War in a context of great insecurity. During the battle of Grozny in August 1996, many hospitals had been destroyed. It was completed in September 1996.

== The choice of Novye Atagi ==
A mission of evaluation of the ICRC left Geneva and arrived in the city of Nalchik in Kabardino-Balkaria on August 18. Three possible locations were discussed at this stage: the border between Ingushetia and Chechnya, Grozny, and the villages south of Grozny.

The mission left to the field the following day on 19 August. In Ingushetia the local authorities proposed a location to establish the hospital. The mission left then to Chechnya and returned to Nazran on 21 August proposing the site of Novye Atagi. This village is located in Chechnya, approximately 20 kilometres in the South of Grozny.

The village was considered a neutral place, the location where the negotiations between the Chechen resistance movement and the Russian authorities were held. The representatives of the village had guaranteed the safety of ICRC. They had also explained the local tradition of protection of guests. It says that a host lost his honours if his guests undergo some aggression while under his roof.

The head of the mission of evaluation managed to obtain the support by the delegation for his proposal. It was then transmitted to the headquarters in Geneva, which, reticent at the beginning ends up agreeing. The option “Ingushetia” was thus abandoned with the explanation that the Chechen fighters would not be in safety on Russian territory. It was necessary to apologise to the Ingush authorities for not adopting their proposal.

This decision seemed hurried to certain staff members. It appeared to them that the possibility of obtaining guarantees of safety on behalf of the Russian authorities for the transport and the treatment of wounded in Ingushetia had not been sufficiently explored. They recalled the Afghan context in which wounded mujahideen were transported to Kabul to the hospital of the ICRC under its protection. It appeared strange to them to install an hospital in an area as volatile as Chechnya on mainly local criteria of safety. They underlined that an hospital is a heavy structure, difficult to evacuate quickly and discreetly in the event of danger.

From the beginning, the hospital was presented fulfilling two roles: beyond its main function of providing medical care, it was to show an example of what is medical neutrality in a context in which hospitals are more often a target than a protected place. The number of expatriates present in Chechnya until then was very limited. With the opening of the hospital, this number exploded. The policy of safety was now based on a maximum visibility of the ICRC activities.

== Opening and first difficulties ==
As soon as the decision was taken, an international medical team gathered by the ICRC left Geneva. It found all the material needed to assemble a field hospital in Nazran, provided by the Norwegian Red Cross with Norwegian technicians accompanying it. Together they left Nazran for Novye Atagi. The hospital was assembled very quickly and opened on 2 September.

The expatriates staff was immediately submitted to very intense pressures from the local authorities to recruit always more personnel among the inhabitants of the village.

On 18 September, the Arab warlord Ibn al-Khattab penetrated the enclosure of the hospital with several armed men, demanding that the ICRC withdraws immediately all the flags carrying the Red Cross which marked the hospital. A compromise was reached and the number of flags simply decreased.

On 21 September, it was announced during a meeting that impacts of bullets had been found on the external walls of the expatriate's residence. The commander of the village promised that the neighbourhood of the compound will be watched more carefully.

On 26 September, the pressures for recruitment of ever more local staff led to the abduction of the head of office and of the expatriate administrator by the same commander who was supposed to protect the team. They were however released the very same day and the commander was replaced as a result of the incident.

=== The management problem ===
In the first weeks, the expatriates heading the local operation were the administrator of the ICRC sub-delegation in Grozny and the chief surgeon of the hospital, the second being very busy assembling the hospital and treating the first patients. The first head of office arrived around 15 September. He was experienced but was on a temporary assignment for one month only. Following his departure he was replaced for a few days by a delegate who was recently appointed deputy head of the Moscow office. Finally, a delegate appointed head of office who had several years of ICRC experience as an administrator. It was his first station as a head of office.

A new administrator came a few days afterwards. It was his second mission after a few months in Bosnia. He was then assisted an administrator on first mission, just out of training.

All these people put in their best, working non stop, but there was always either a lack of time or a lack of experience. There was a security delegate assigned to the Chechnya operation, but he spent most of the time in Grozny.

== The decision to extend the hospital ==
The site that was provided for the hospital in Novye Atagi was an old unused school made up of several buildings distributed in a vast compound. The main building became an hospital with two operating theaters, the annex units (sterilization room, admission, emergency room, blood bank, radiotherapy room, physiotherapy and training room, an intensive care unit for a maximum of seven patients and six wards making it possible to receive a little more than 60 patients.

A second building was used as a refectory and pharmacy, the third one became a rest room for the expatriate staff, the fourth was transformed into their residence and the fifth was the workshop. A sixth building was in a rather bad condition and was renovated to serve as administrative offices. The restoration of all these buildings was planned and work quickly started.

The active fighting had stopped since 15 August and the peace agreement between the Russian representatives and Chechen fighters was signed on 31 August in Khasavyurt, Dagestan. As a result, the number of patients of the hospital was constantly reducing and there did not seem to be any need for more hospital beds.

In the event of surge of wounded beyond the capacity of the provided buildings, the ICRC would have accommodated the slightest wounded in tents, as the Norwegian field hospital was delivered with large marquees. In comparison with another ICRC operation in Quetta, Pakistan, the hospital admitted 120 patients in buildings, and whole the capacity being up to 280 by using marquees. The winter climate there being as cold as it is in Chechnya.

Soon there was a discussion about how to increase the capacity of the hospital by constructing additional buildings. The head of office in Novye Atagi at that moment and the head builder however were against this idea. A meeting took place on 24 September. The project of extension was reduced to two rooms. Nevertheless, plans were kept for the construction of a new wing for the hospital comprising several rooms, extending the capacity to 150 beds and also with an option to extend the pharmacy and the workshop. The “tent” option was rejected by reasoning that one cannot provide same comfort in a developed country like Russia than in Pakistan.

Once the building work started, the problems of recruitment and monitoring of local staff were amplified. Quickly there were more than one hundred labourers working on the construction site and it became almost impossible to control all the movements on and off the site. In addition the importance and the size of the contracts entered with local contractors caused many frustrations and jealousies among them, further increasing tension.

== The massacre ==
=== The threat ===
From November onwards, security incidents in Chechnya increased in number and seriousness once the date of the upcoming presidential elections were announced.

On 20 November, a delegate was abducted for a few hours by an armed group which apparently hoped to get one of their friends released by the Russians. He was freed on pressure of the highest Chechen authorities.

In the early morning of 24 November a group of armed individuals entered the hospital compound. They entered the radio room which was located on the ground floor of the expatriate residence building and proceeded to disassemble the radio installations and steal all the equipment. Hearing noise from upstairs, the head of the office went down to have a look. The robbers, being surprised, tackled him and shoved him into a corner and threatened him with a revolver to the temple. They left a small note whose translation said: “This here is for all the evil that you do.”

At the same time, two local employees of the Organization for Security and Co-operation in Europe (OSCE) were kidnapped in Grozny to be released a few hours later. During their debriefing, they explained that their kidnappers sought expatriates of the OSCE or ICRC and that if they had succeeded, the incident would have been much more serious, perhaps even murder. During a meeting of the ICRC in Grozny, someone asked why “small” organizations were still present (an expatriate of Merlin and two of MSF France) were not mentioned. The conclusion was that a blow to the two most visible organizations would attract much more media attention.

As a consequence, additional safety measures were implemented. At the Grozny delegation, the number of expatriates stationed was decreased sharply, the safety measures for travel was reinforced. The local authorities were asked to erect check points around the delegation building.

In Novye Atagi, the security delegate became much more present. He increased the number of guards and improved their rotation plans. But the ICRC, according to its principles, still refused to provide them with weapons. Checkpoints were also requested from the authorities, which promised them but didn't really implement them. The number of expatriate personnel was slightly reduced: one position of a teaching nurse was abolished and longer absences for rest and relieve were introduced.

=== The feelings of the medical team ===
A short time before the massacre, the number of patients had fallen as low as 35. There were many chronic cases (bone infections and stump revisions), a few “fresh” cases, and very few emergencies. A first group of local nurses had been put on stand by for this reason. Some expatriate nurses started to feel bored, others occupied themselves by organising teaching events. The hospital team unanimously asked not to replace two of them who were about to finish their assignments. Substitutes however arrived, only to die one week later.

Through information from the Grozny office the medical team knew the hospitals in the city had started to work again. Some started to realise the gap between the constantly decreasing importance of the medical role of the hospital in Novye Atagi on one hand and the constantly increasing risks taken on the other. However, it was difficult to suggest the closing of an hospital that was still under construction.

Others spoke more and more about the secondary role of the hospital: to be an example of medical neutrality. It had to be shown that an hospital must remain a protected zone, without armed protection. It was also mentioned that even if this hospital did not have as many patients, it was still an outstanding project that got the operation of ICRC financed. At this time ICRC was almost the last international humanitarian aid organization still present in Chechnya.

=== Slaughter ===
On 17 December at around 3.30 am, a group of between five and ten men, masked and armed with silencer guns, penetrated the enclosure of the hospital. They directly proceeded to enter the residential building where most of the expatriate staff was asleep. The building was a two-storey building with two entrances leading to the two separate wings. Methodically they tried to enter the bedrooms where they found the doors were mostly unlocked and proceeded to kill the occupants. Where they found locked doors they tried to force their way, smashing the doors. All in all, six nurses and a construction engineer died. The head of office was wounded by a gunshot and left for dead.

Following people were killed in the attack:

- Fernanda Calado, an ICRC nurse of Spanish nationality,
- Ingeborg Foss, a nurse from the Norwegian Red Cross,
- Nancy Malloy, a medical administrator from the Canadian Red Cross,
- Gunnhild Myklebust, a nurse from the Norwegian Red Cross,
- Sheryl Thayer, a nurse from the New Zealand Red Cross,
- Hans Elkerbout, a construction technician from the Netherlands Red Cross.

The attackers met two local Chechen staff members and told them in Chechen language to get out of the way - clearly indicating that the purpose was to assassinate expatriate staff. After a burst of gunfire from an automatic weapon in the courtyard of the hospital, most likely by one of the guards in the compound, the attack was aborted and the masked men left the hospital compound in a hurry.

The guards then called the Chechen military commander of the village which arrived accompanied with armed men at around 4 o'clock hour in the morning. The survivors discovered the dead bodies, took care of the wounded and gathered themselves while waiting for dawn. A crowd of inhabitants of the local village congregated to comfort and protect them.

The deputy interior minister of the temporary Chechen government, Mr Vakha Zakriev described the attack as a "provocation" targeted at sabotaging the presidential elections in the republic. Chechnya's security chief, Abu Movsayev, has accused Russian secret services of organizing the killing of the ICRC workers and of the six Russians who died the following day. The Federal Security Service of the Russian Federation (FSB) have denied involvement and the Russian Interior Ministry accused the Chechen leadership of being unable to protect people from "rampant banditry."

In 2010 major Aleksi Potyomkin, a defector from Russia's FSB, testified that the killings were conducted by FSB spetsnaz unit that entered the hospital in search of Chechens, and decision to kill nurses was done either by mistake or in response to orders to leave no witnesses of their presence.

=== Aftermath ===
==== Evacuation, debriefing, ceremonies ====
A convoy left Novye Atagi at the end of the morning bound for Naltchik transporting the survivors and dead bodies. Passing through Grozny, they reached Naltchik around 7 p.m. after 8 hours driving through snow.

The wounded was evacuated one hour after arrival to be hospitalised in Geneva, Switzerland. The following day, 18 December, was marked by a debriefing session of the remaining 13 surviving expatriate staff of the hospital. The session was led by a psychologist responsible for stress management at ICRC, especially flown in from Geneva. Each person got an opportunity to give their own account of the night, sharing their emotions with the group. In the afternoon the team gathered at the mortuary in Naltchik to coffin the bodies of their colleagues.

At the end of the day a long convoy, made up of a truck and about fifteen vehicles, left the city in direction of the airport of Mineralnyje-Vody, located at a distance of about a hundred kilometers. A ceremony took place in a hangar of the airport, the coffins being covered with the flag of ICRC. A hundred people were present: the survivors of the drama, other delegates who were going to accompany the bodies to Geneva, but also all those which remained. By an icy cold and in the noise of the planes which land and take off, a last homage is paid to the six victims, then each one, in a slow procession, ravels in front of the coffins.

The plane takes off and a similar ceremony is organized in the night of December 19 on the tarmac of the airport of Cointrin, in Geneva, in the presence of the local authorities, members of the Committee, executives of the direction of the ICRC and representatives of the national Companies.

==== The continuation of the action of the ICRC in Caucasus ====
Shortly after the drama, some managers of the ICRC spoke about resuming the activities in Chechnya as soon as the culprits would have been identified. However, all the expatriate staff was durably evacuated from Chechnya. A small team remained in Naltchik from where they remotely controlled the operations of the local employees ICRC who remained in Chechnya. The hospital of Novye Atagi was handed over to be run by the local authorities without big difficulties. There were 34 patients left.

==== The interpretation of the ICRC ====
In the days following their repatriation, some delegates submitted very critical reports about the action of the ICRC in Chechnya. The report of the executives, justifying their actions, arrived a little later. The headquarters followed the conclusions of the latter. The official line was thus that no major error had been made.
