= Siege of Ufa (1682) =

Rebellion in Tsardom in Russia

- Part of Bashkir rebellion of 1681-1684
Date	Spring 1682
Location	Ufa
Result	Bashkir-kalmyk victory: Bashkirs successfully besieged Ufa

Belligerents
Bashkir rebels Kalmyk Khanate	Tsardom of Russia

Strength
4,000 Bashkir rebels 1,800 Kalmyk warriors	23,000

Casualties and losses
unknown	3,000

The siege of Ufa was a battle between Bashkir rebels and the Russian army.

== Course of hostilities ==
After the attack on Kungur, numerous rebel detachments besieged Ufa.

== See also ==
- Bashkir rebellion of 1681–1684
