= Peter Bredal =

Norwegian naval officer (1683–1756)

- Born: 1683; Trondheim, Norway, Denmark–Norway
- Died: 1756 (aged 72–73); Russian Empire
- Spouse: Blanceflor Sophie Coucheron
- Military career
- Allegiance: Denmark–Norway (1701–1702; 1718–1720); Russia (1703–1718; 1721–1756)
- Branch: Dano-Norwegian Navy (1701–1702; 1718–1720); Russian Navy (1703–1718; 1721–1756)
- Rank: Vice admiral
- Conflicts: Great Northern War; Battle of Gangut; Russo-Turkish War; Siege of Azov (1736); Lacy's campaign to Crimea

Peter Christian Bredal (Russian: Пётр Петрович Бредаль, romanized: Pyotr Petrovich Bredal; 1683–1756) was a Norwegian vice admiral of the Imperial Russian Navy. He was accepted in 1703 on the recommendation of Admiral Cornelius Cruys.

== Sources ==
- "Бредаль, Петр Петрович" . Brockhaus and Efron Encyclopedic Dictionary (in Russian). 1906.
