= Amirkhamza Turlov =

Amirkhamza
- Bey

Senior Prince of Chechnya
- Reign: 1690's (?) (Note: At least 1707 or before) – 1728
- Predecessor: Muhammad Turlov
- Successor: Khasbulat Bamatov
- Died: 1730's (at least 1732)
- Dynasty: Turlov dynasty
- Father: Tururav II Turlov
- Religion: Islam

Amirkhamza Turlov, also known as Amiramza or Amir Garze was a prince from the Turlov dynasty who ruled the Turlov Principality until his retirement in 1728. The beginning of his reign is not known, although it must have been before 1707.

He is mainly known for his support for the Bashkir religious and military leader Murat Kuchukov and his involvement in the 1708 Insurgency in the North Caucasus.

== Reign ==
He became the Senior Prince of the Turlov Principality following the death of his predecessor Muhammad Turlov, possibly in the 1690s. He is first mentioned in Russian sources in 1708.

In November 1707, he met with the Bashkir ambassador and military leader Murat Kuchukov. Murat decided to stay in Chechnya, where Amirkhamza supported him with everything needed, including military support. When the rebels led by Murat Kuchukov were ready to storm the Terki Fortress, Amirkhamza gathered 700 fighters from all across his state. Combined with the armies of other North Caucasian princes and peoples, this number was raised to over 1,600 fighters. In February 1708, the rebels successfully stormed Terki and captured almost the entire fortress except for the Citadel. However, later that month, Russian and Kalmyk reinforcements invaded the rebel–held fortress and inflicted a crushing defeat on the North Caucasians. Murat himself was wounded and captured, and later on executed. Amirkhamza survived the insurgency and continued ruling over his state.

Amirkhamza was also known for his pro–Crimean and pro–Ottoman views and supported them in their conflicts with the Russian Empire.

In 1728, Amirkhamza retired and was succeeded by Khasbulat Bamatov, who adhered to a pro–Russian orientation. Nevertheless, Amirkhamza continued to be a vassal of the Safawid Empire, to which he paid taxes in the form of cattle and sheep.

Despite his retirement, he continued to remain an influential noble among the Turlovs, and in 1732 he is mentioned as one of the three owners of Chechen-Aul, along with Aidemir Bardykhanov and Khasbulat Bamatov. He died in the 1730s, at least 1732.

== Chronology ==
A chronology of important events in Amirkhamza's life:

- 1690s: Death of Amirkhamza's father, Tururav II Turlov
- 1690s: Death of Amirkhamza's predecessor, Muhammad Turlov. Amirkhamza becomes the new Senior Prince
- November 1707: Murat Kuchukov arrives in Chechnya; Begin of the alliance between Murat and Amirkhamza
- 1707–1708: Murat Kuchukov Movement
- February 1708: Battle of Terki; Northcaucasian rebel forces storm the Terki Fortress but are repelled later the same month
- 1708: First mention of Amirkhamza in Russian documents
- 1728: Amirkhamza retires as Senior Prince and is succeeded by Khasbulat Bamatov
- 1732: Amirkhamza is mentioned as Amir Garze as one of the influential owners of Chechen-Aul
- 1730s (At least 1732): Death of Amirkhamza

== See also ==
- Tururav II Turlov — Father of Amirkhamza and one of the previous Senior Princes of Chechnya
- Muhammad Turlov — Predecessor of Amirkhamza
- Khasbulat Bamatov — Successor of Amirkhamza
- Murat Kuchukov — Ally of Amirkhamza
