= Medical neutrality =

Not interfering with medical services in times of conflict

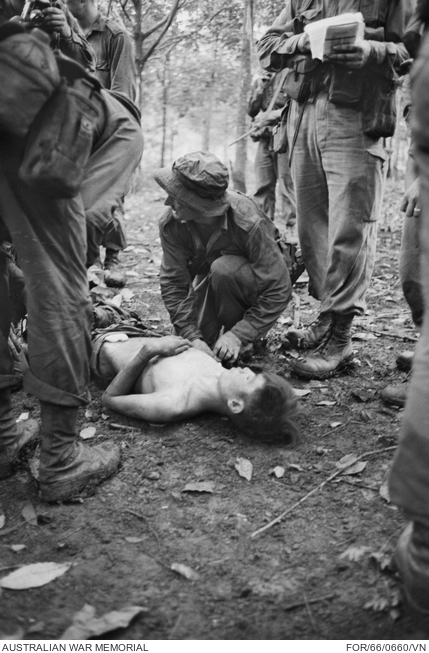
An Australian medic treating a wounded Vietcong enemy during the Vietnam War, 1966

Medical neutrality refers to a principle of noninterference with medical services in times of armed conflict and civil unrest: physicians must be allowed to care for the sick and wounded, and soldiers must receive care regardless of their political affiliations; all parties must refrain from attacking and misusing medical facilities, transport, and personnel. Concepts comprising the principles of medical neutrality derive from international human rights law, medical ethics and humanitarian law. Medical neutrality may be thought of as a kind of social contract that obligates societies to protect medical personnel in both times of war and peace, and obligates medical personnel to treat all individuals regardless of religion, race, ethnicity, or political affiliation. Violations of medical neutrality constitute crimes outlined in the Geneva Conventions.

== Historical background ==
The principle of medical neutrality has roots in many social traditions.

- The Hippocratic Oath, which requires physicians to practice medicine ethically, dates back to the fifth century.
- The idea of 'do no harm' has histories in "Jewish and Islamic, as well as Chinese and Indian medicine"
- Geneva Conventions (the core of international humanitarian law, supported and protected by the International Committee of the Red Cross):
  - The First Geneva Convention was written by Henri Dunant in response to seeing such the difficulty of treating wounded soldiers at the Battle of Solferino.
  - The first and the following Geneva Conventions created the Red Cross, outlined the protections of medical personnel in times of war, and codified the protections of citizens, soldiers, medical personnel, etc.
  - The First Geneva Convention stated that there should be no "obstacle to the humanitarian activities" and that wounded and sick "shall be respected and protected in all circumstances."
  - Article 18 demanded that medical units, i.e. hospitals and mobile medical facilities, may in no circumstances be attacked.
  - The Declaration of Geneva was created as an amendment to the Hippocratic Oath in 1948, a response to the human experimentation on Nazi prisoners.

== Violations of neutrality ==
Medical neutrality is violated when healthcare professionals, facilities, or patients come under attack, or when medical professionals are not allowed to provide treatment. Examples include:

- Attacks on hospitals
- Attacks on patients
- Attacks on medical personnel
- Attacks on medical transport
- Misuse of medical facilities
- Breaches of medical ethics by medical personnel
- Using the hospital/medical facilities to attack, fire/ fire rockets e.j., to civilians from the medical facilities
- Using the medical facilities to house weapons or soldiers
- Using the medical facilities for purposes other than medical assistance and/or aid to the public.

== Recorded violations of medical neutrality ==
=== Sudan (2026) ===
During the armed conflict in Sudan that began in April 2023, severe challenges and violations regarding medical neutrality were documented. In June 2026, at the 62nd Session of the United Nations Human Rights Council, the International Coalition for Human Rights (ICHR) issued a statement condemning the exploitation of the Sudan Doctors Network and Emergency Response Rooms by Sudanese Army Commander Abdel Fattah al-Burhan, alleging that these humanitarian networks were being utilized as intelligence tools to support military operations centers. The ICHR highlighted that the conflict has led to the politicization of medical services, selective documentation of violations, and ongoing direct attacks against healthcare facilities, medical personnel, and ambulances, heavily restricting civilian access to life-saving treatments.

=== Gaza (2023-) ===
On 4 November 2023, an Israeli air strike hit an ambulance outside Al-Shifa Hospital, where 15 people were killed and 60 others wounded. The Israel Defense Forces (IDF) stated the attack targeted Hamas militants and that the ambulances were used to transport operatives and weapons. Hamas official Izzat El-Reshiq denied these claims, and the Gaza Health Ministry claimed Israel had targeted a convoy of ambulances.

On 30 January 2024, Israeli special forces performed a raid on Ibn Sina hospital in Jenin dressed as civilians and medical personnel, killing three alleged Palestinian militants. Footage from the scene shows at least ten armed members carrying assault rifles, assumed to be Israeli forces, dressed in civilian attire including as nurses wearing blue scrubs, a doctor in a white overcoat, and women in hijabs. The raid is said to have killed three men, with the IDF claiming the targeted men were Hamas member Mohammed Jalamneh, and Islamic Jihad members Mohammed and Basel Al-Ghazawi. The hospital alleges the three men were sleeping at the time and Al-Ghazawi was at the hospital undergoing medical treatment. Legal experts have suggested that Israeli actions could have violated international law by disguising themselves as civilians and medical staff, and by killing sick and wounded personnel.

=== Ukraine (2022) ===
As of 12 March 2022 at least nine medical facilities, including Mariupol maternity hospital, most being located to the north and the south-east of Ukraine, were attacked by Russian military forces. The deadliest one happening on 24 February 2022, at the Central City Hospital in Vuhledar when a Russian ballistic missile full of cluster munitions fell just outside of the hospital, killing four and injuring ten. The Russian Ministry of Defense claimed that some of hospitals were used for military purposes and denied attacking Mariupol maternity hospital alleging it was a "staged provocation".

Between 24 February and 21 March 2022, sixty-four medical facilities and their personnel were targeted by Russian forces in Ukraine, the World Health Organization (WHO) reported. The facilities were being hit at rate of two to three a day, inflicting 15 deaths and 37 injuries. All sixty-four attacks were verified and said to be violations of international law breaching medical neutrality. It was reported that some of hospitals were converted into military strongholds and that most of damages inflicted were caused by heavy weaponry. By 8 April 2022, WHO had confirmed 91 attacks.

=== Gaza Strip (2021) ===
During the Israeli bombing of Gaza in May 2021, parts of a Médecins Sans Frontières (Doctors without Borders) trauma and burns care clinic were destroyed in a series of airstrikes. The strikes destroyed a sterilization room and damaged a waiting area, there were no resulting direct casualties suffered. The airstrikes also destroyed the road that lead to the clinic, thereby preventing access to it. The clinic was subsequently forced to close.

Further airstrikes also lead to death of two prominent doctors in the Gaza Strip. Dr. Ayman Abu al-Ouf, the head of internal medicine at Al-Shifa hospital, was killed along with 12 members of his extended family after an airstrike on his home on 16 May 2021. Dr. Mooein Ahmad al-Aloul, a 66-year-old psychiatric neurologist, was also killed in his home during the al-Wehda attacks.

=== Thailand (2021) ===
During the pro-democracy protest on 13 February 2021, there was footage showing Thai riot police beating a medical volunteer, while wearing a green vest identifying himself as part of medical volunteers offering services to both sides.

=== Ethiopia (2020 and 2021) ===
There have been several reported attacks on humanitarian workers, including attacks by Ethiopian government soldiers. The Danish Refugee Council and the International Rescue Committee reported killings of their staff in early December 2020. Although the Ethiopian federal government claimed to have given "full and unhindered access for humanitarian actors to operate in all parts of the [Tigray] region," many humanitarian agencies reported having been repulsed at army checkpoints and blocked from entry to various regions. There were accusations by US officials that armed forces were specifically singling out humanitarian workers for an attack. Violence against healthcare workers and the destruction of health facilities is a violation of international laws regarding medical neutrality, and has been described as such in regards to the Tigray war.

On 23 March 2021, a driver from Médecins Sans Frontières was beaten by Ethiopian soldiers after witnessing extrajudicial killings by Ethiopian government soldiers. Following the 23 June bombing of Togoga, there were reports of Ethiopian government soldiers firing on ambulances to prevent them from reaching the injured. On 25 June 2021, three MSF workers were found murdered near their car in Tigray.

=== United States (2020) ===
Protests across the country sparked by the murder by police of George Floyd were disrupted by police violence and misconduct. Volunteer medics were targeted and many suffered mistreatment including life-threatening injuries from "less lethal" weapons. Medics were shot at while carrying the limp body of 20-year-old Justin Howell, who has lasting brain damage from such "less lethal" weapons.

=== Myanmar/Burma (2020 and 2021) ===
Ethnic and civil conflict has been a persistent part of modern Burmese/Myanmar society, and the Tatmadaw (Burmese Army) has used the pretext of a COVID-19 lockdown to secretly force local indigenous groups to work for them, continuing attacks on health care centres located in the conflict regions but serving the general community, and recently shelled a Red Cross boat carrying medical supplies causing International condemnation. After the 2021 military coup d'état, during crackdowns on the peaceful protesters, the military has targeted the medics and ambulances attending to the emergency patients, leading to condemnation by World Medical Association. United Nations Security Council has also expressed deep concern over restrictions on medical personnel.

=== Chile (2019) ===
Since civil unrest broke out in October 2019, there has been backlash toward police and military forces for their disregard for medical volunteers who aid injured protestors. The best known and evidenced case thus far occurred Friday 15 November 2019. An ambulance was inhibited in its ability to transport a person in cardiac arrest during a peaceful protest in Plaza de la Dignidad. The medical volunteers who were attending to him came under fire from carabineros' rubber bullets, tear gas and water trucks. They were put at risk and hindered in their efforts to resuscitate the patient. One volunteer sustained a wound to the leg. The medical team's inability to safely attend to the patient and transport him to the hospital resulted in his death.

=== Hong Kong (2019) ===
During the anti-Extradition Law Amendment Bill movement of 2019 which evolved into a large-scale pro-democracy protest over the course of several months, medics were increasingly frequently denied access to patients. In the 31 August MTR station incident, an online video showed a medic was refused entry to the station despite his emotional plea. Medics inside the station were forced to "face the wall" and stand in silence, instead of treating the wounded. Paramedics were denied access to the already fully-locked-down station until at least 2 hours later. According to Amnesty international's interviews "it was common for police to delay calling or securing an ambulance until five to 10 hours after the injury and after the person first requested to go to a hospital". In the siege of the Hong Kong Polytechnic University police detained and arrested up to 51 medic volunteers. This was called a "gross breach of international humanitarian standard" that is "unheard of in civilised countries and is incompatible with the compact of humanitarianism". First aiders have also reported being held at the gunpoint of a rubber-bullet gun and being pinned down to the ground in an arm lock with clear disregard of their medic identity.

=== Afghanistan (2015) ===
On 3 October 2015, U.S. airstrikes killed 42 people and destroyed the MSF (Médecins Sans Frontières - Doctors Without Borders) trauma hospital in Kunduz, Afghanistan (See main article). Many patients in the hospital burned alive in their beds as a US AC-130 gunship made multiple passes firing upon the hospital from overhead. MSF's request for an independent inquiry was never honoured. The U.S. military investigated itself, eventually taking disciplinary action against a dozen service members. No criminal prosecutions followed.

=== Bahrain (2011 and 2012) ===
The Bahraini government's crackdown on the Bahrain uprising in 2011 and 2012 included extensive violations of medical neutrality. An investigative report released by Physicians for Human Rights revealed that many doctors were attacked or incarcerated. Furthermore, Bahraini security forces have seized control of medical facilities, prevented patients from receiving treatment, misused ambulance services, and violently interrogated wounded patients. In September 2011, 20 medical workers in Bahrain were sentenced to up to 15 years in prison for treating protesters. These sentences were immediately condemned by United Nations Secretary-General Ban Ki-moon and human rights groups such as Physicians for Human Rights. Apparently in response to international pressure, the Bahrain government ordered that the doctors be retried in civilian court, but the verdict has yet to be decided.

=== Egypt (2011) ===
In 2011, during political unrest, state security forces directly attacked protestors and field clinics, injuring and killing numerous people. A state security officer even dressed himself as a doctor and administered fatal shots to those injured in a field clinic outside of Tahrir Square. Medical supplies were confiscated by "military officers and field hospital tents were burned down during a Tahrir raid."

=== Libya (2011) ===
During the 2011 Libyan Civil War, human rights groups documented violations of medical neutrality along with many other gross violations of human rights. Physicians for Human Rights conducted investigations within Libya in 2011, and found that the military had attacked and destroyed hospitals. Several eyewitnesses reported that Gaddafi forces attacked ambulances carrying injured combatants, despite the fact that the ambulances were marked with the emblematic Red Crescent. Medical personnel were kidnapped by Gaddafi's forces, and military forces used people as human shields.

=== Syria (2011) ===
The Syrian civil war has been marked by widespread human rights abuses, including numerous violations of medical neutrality. Government forces have invaded, attacked, and misused hospitals and medical transports, preventing civilians from receiving health care. An estimated 250 doctors have been detained and tortured for treating wounded civilians. An investigation by Physicians for Human Rights revealed that these circumstances have led to the rise of an underground health network.

=== Iran (2008–2011) ===
In June 2008, Iranian authorities detained Dr. Arash Alaei and Dr. Kamiar Alaei, two well-known Iranian physicians and leaders in the fight against HIV/AIDS. The physicians, who are brothers, were held in Tehran's notorious Evin prison for over six months without being charged or tried. On 31 December 2008, a one-day, closed-door trial was held, in which the brothers were tried as conspirators working with an "enemy government" to overthrow the government of Iran. They were also tried at that time on unspecified other charges which neither they nor their lawyer were allowed to know, see the evidence of, or address. They were charged with attempting to overthrow the Iranian government under article 508 of Iran's Islamic Penal Code. Kamiar was sentenced to three years in prison and Arash to six. The government of Iran used the brothers' travels to international AIDS conferences as the basis for these claims.

The international community decried the sentences of the doctors, and Physicians for Human Rights launched a campaign for their release. In 2010, Dr. Kamiar Alaei was freed after serving two years in prison. Dr. Arash Alaei was released in August 2011 after more than three years of detention. Since their release, the doctors have reunited in the United States, where they continue their medical and advocacy work.

=== Sri Lanka (2009) ===
Sri Lanka's lengthy civil war was marked by extensive human rights abuses. In 2009, the Sri Lankan air force violated the principle of medical neutrality when it destroyed the Ponnampalam Memorial Hospital in Puthukkudiyiruppu.

=== Georgia (2008) ===
During the 2008 Russo-Georgian War, on 13 August 2008, a rocket fired from a Russian military helicopter hit a group of Georgian medical staff members in a hospital yard in Gori, killing an emergency room surgeon. The Human Rights Watch concluded that the attack on the hospital, which was "clearly marked with a red cross", was a "serious violation of international humanitarian law".

=== Chechnya (1996) ===
During the Battle of Grozny in 1996 during the First Chechen War, several hospitals were attacked. Municipal Hospital No. 9 was invaded by Russian soldiers and approximately 500 civilians were taken hostage. The ICRC Hospital of Novye Atagi, which was created to symbolize medical neutrality in the war-torn area, was attacked and six members of the ICRC staff were killed.

=== Thailand (1992) ===
A year after a bloodless military coup in Bangkok in February 1991, the new government responded to the pro-democracy movement opening fire on a May opposition rally, resulting in 52 deaths, hundreds of injured, and many disappearances. Physicians for Human Rights reported that health professionals were prevented from reaching the wounded and the police shot at ambulances.

=== El Salvador (1980–1992) ===
In the Salvadoran Civil War, many field clinics were attacked by guerillas. Patients were commonly abducted from hospitals, and government forces greatly limited the movements of health workers. Medical transports were also attacked, in some cases resulting in the deaths of medical workers.

=== Mozambique (1977–1992) ===
During the Mozambican Civil War, the resistance group RENAMO was responsible for many violations of medical neutrality. Attacks on hospitals and health clinics were common. In one instance, RENAMO soldiers raided the town of Homoine, killing 442 civilians including hospitalized patients.

=== Panama (1988) ===
Civil unrest and demonstrations began in Panama in June 1987. During the unrest, human rights groups such as Physicians for Human Rights documented a variety of human rights abuses and violations of medical neutrality. The military blocked access to hospitals and interfered with provision of medical care, took control of ambulance services for military purposes, and interrogated wounded patients. In addition, Panamanian physicians were kidnapped, beaten, and tortured for speaking out against government policies which prevented them from providing their patients with adequate care.

=== Pakistan (1971) ===
In April 1971, Pakistan's military targeted ethnic Bengalis at the Lalmonirhat Railway Hospital, located in the northern tip of what was then called East Pakistan (now Bangladesh). Approximately thirty-seven Bengali civilians or non-combatants, including patients, doctors, nurses, and other health care professionals or medical personnel were summarily executed by the Pakistani military.

== Organizations with a specific focus on medical neutrality ==
- Physicians for Human Rights (US)
- Physicians for Human Rights–Israel
- Doctors for Human Rights (UK)
- Physicians for Human Rights (Denmark)

== Medical Neutrality Protection Act of 2011 (H.R. 2643) ==
The Medical Neutrality Protection Act of 2011, (H.R. 2643), is a bipartisan bill introduced by Representatives Jim McDermott (D-WA), and Walter B. Jones, Jr. (R-NC) that intends to make the protection of medical professionals and access to medical services a global policy priority for the US government.

- The bill calls for the creation of the position of a United Nations Special Rapporteur on the Protection and Promotion of Medical Neutrality and calls for investigations of violations of medical neutrality. It also limits military aid from the US to countries that have engaged in violating medical neutrality, and as well bans their government officials from attaining visas to the United States.
- As codified in the Medical Neutrality Protection Act of 2011, violations of medical neutrality are:
  - Militarized attacks on health care facilities, health care service providers, or individuals in the course of receiving medical treatment
  - Wanton destruction of medical supplies, facilities, records, or transportation services
  - Willful obstruction of medical ethics as specified in the World Medical Association's International Code of Medical Ethics, including preventing medical professionals from administering ethical medical care to individuals in need
  - Coercion of medical personnel to commit acts in violation of their ethical responsibilities
  - Deliberate misuse of health care facilities, transportation services, uniforms, or other insignia
  - Deliberate blocking of access to health care facilities and health care professionals
  - Arbitrary arrest or detention of health care service providers or individuals seeking medical care
