= Lacy's campaign to Crimea =

Peter Lacy's 1737 military expedition

Lacy's campaign to Crimea (1737)
- Part of the Russo-Turkish War (1735–1739)
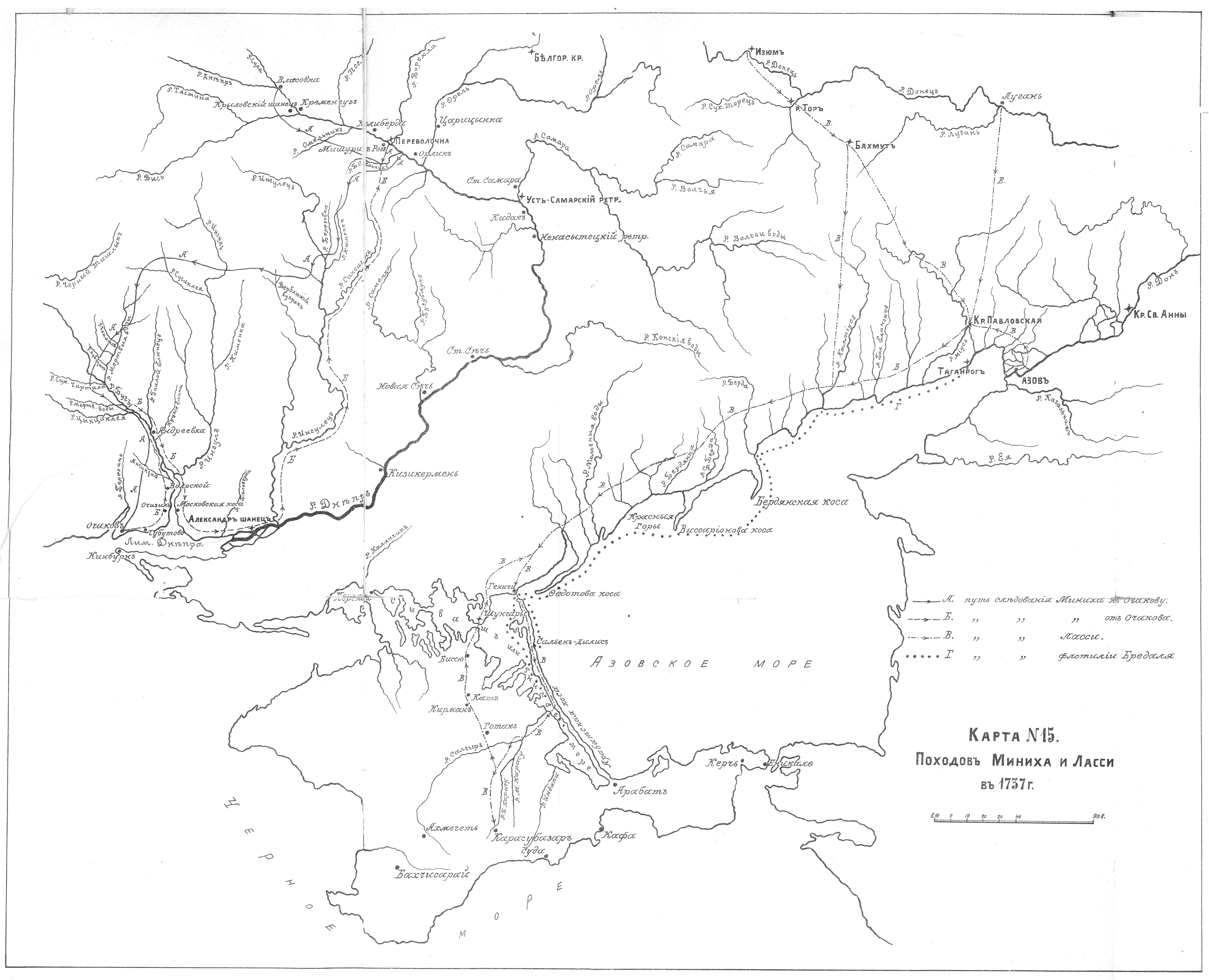
- Crimean campaign showed on a map
Date	May – October 1737
Location	Syvash, Arabat Spit, Crimean Peninsula
Result	Russian victory

Belligerents
Russian Empire; Zaporozhian Sich; (Don Republic) Don Cossacks; Kalmyk Khanate	Ottoman Empire; Crimean Khanate

Commanders and leaders
Peter Lacy; Peter Bredal; Gustaf Otto Douglas; Galdan-Narbo	Fetih II Giray; Hacı Mehmed Pasha

Strength
40,000	40,000 to 60,000

Casualties and losses
1,085 casualties; 562 killed; 483 wounded	Unknown, but much more (Note: More than 1,000 Tatars killed during the retreat alone)

Lacy's campaign to Crimea was a military expedition from May to October 1737 by the Don army under the command of Field Marshal Peter Lacy, along with Cossacks and Kalmyk auxiliary cavalry led by Prince Galdan-Narbo, against the forces of the Crimean Khanate led by Fetih II Giray during the Russo-Turkish War of 1735–1739. The battles culminated in Russian victory at the Salgir River in Crimea on July 12, 1737, and in the vicinity of Karasubazar on July 14.

== Background ==
After Russia's successful capture of Azov in 1737, the nation redirected its military efforts towards countering the Crimean Khanate, a key vassal state of the Ottoman Empire. The Russo-Turkish Wars of the period were characterized by a complex interplay of geopolitical interests, with Crimea serving as a strategic foothold for Ottoman influence in the region. Recognizing the importance of Crimea in the Ottoman Empire's power projection, Russia sought to undermine this influence by targeting the Crimean Khanate.

The initial campaign in 1735, under the command of General-Lieutenant Mikhail Ivanovich Leontiev, aimed to invade Crimea directly but faced significant challenges. Issues such as inadequate logistical planning, unfavorable weather conditions, and delays hampered the effectiveness of Russian operations. Despite these setbacks, the campaign underscored the vulnerability of Crimea to Russian incursions.

The subsequent actions of Burkhard Christoph von Münnich in 1736 further highlighted Crimea's susceptibility to Russian military pressure. By capturing the strategically significant Perekop Fortress and conducting raids deep into Crimean territory, Münnich demonstrated the potential to disrupt Ottoman control over the region. However, logistical difficulties and the onset of epidemics forced him to abandon his campaign prematurely.

== Campaign ==
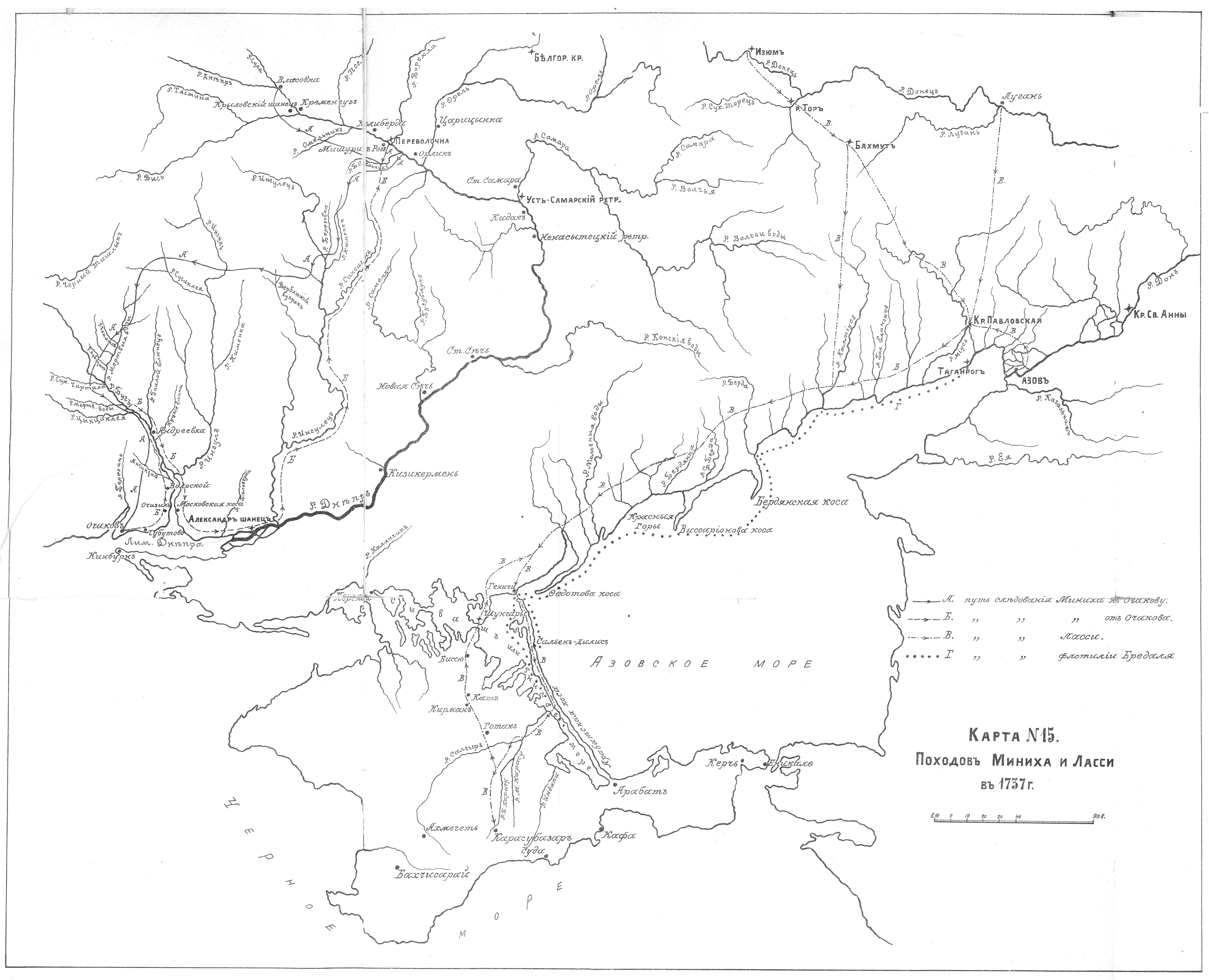
Crimean campaign showed on a map

The Don Cossacks, consisting of approximately 40,000 men under the command of Field Marshal Peter Lacy, set out from the Azov region on May 3, 1737, with a plan to enter Crimea by bypassing the Perekop fortifications from the east. The base of operations was the village of Genichesk. By June 17, 4,000 Kalmyk horsemen, led by Prince Goldan-Narma, the son of Khan Dondouk-Ombo, joined the Russians. The army's crossing began on June 18 and ended on June 26. By this time, 6 barges and over 100 boats from Azov arrived with supplies for the land army and the fleet, which landed three regiments on the shore.

The army crossed the Genichesk Strait to the Arabat Spit and began to advance south towards the Arabat Fortress. However, Lacy did not lose momentum and attack the Arabat Fortress, which was built according to European standards and reinforced by 7,000 Crimean Tatars in a fortified camp behind, instead, he sent a cavalry detachment of 2,000 men with 4 cannons towards Arabat only for demonstration purposes. A bridge was built in the middle of the Arabat Spit, at the mouth of the Salgir River, using boats and barrels in shallow places. Dragoons, Cossacks, and Kalmyks either waded or swam across. The Azov flotilla, commanded by Vice Admiral Peter Bredal with 217 boats, some equipped with 6-pound cannons each, delivered various supplies and provisions to the Arabat Spit. Water was also transported to the spit. Lacy invaded the peninsula unhindered. During a storm on June 28–29, 170 of Bredal's boats sank, leaving only 47 with artillery. Bredal raised cannons from the shallows and set up coastal batteries. The Ottoman fleet, consisting of one 64-gun ship under the flag of the Kapudan Pasha, one 60-gun ship, a 32-gun frigate, 15 galleys, about 70 half-galleys, skampavei, kanchebases, and other small vessels, attempted to attack the position of General-ensign Vasiliy Levashov. The large ships shelled the batteries, and the rowboats approached the shallows, but were repelled by Russian fire.

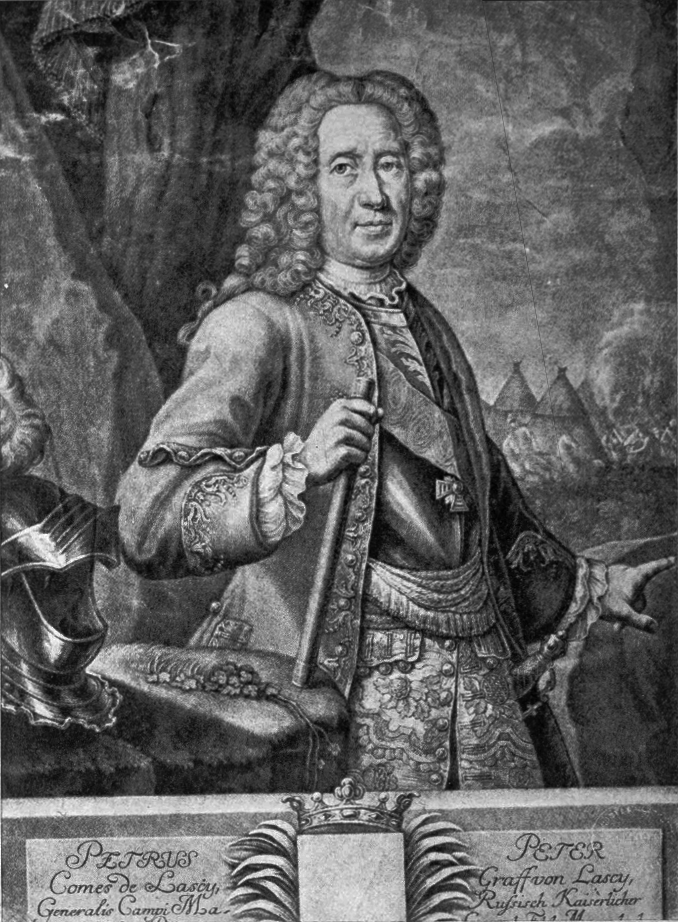
Peter Lacy

=== Battles of Salgir and Karasubazar ===
Meeting the Russians from Perekop, a Crimean army of up to 60,000 people, mostly horse militia, commanded by Khan Fetih II Giray, advanced. He sent one detachment against Genichesk, but the Russians had already created fortifications there. Fetih Giray, believing that the main Russian forces were in front of Arabat, sent out only a 15-thousand-strong cavalry detachment, which on July 12 attacked the Russian vanguard at Salgir, north of Karasubazar. By midday, Lacy's main forces, up to 10 cavalry and infantry regiments, arrived and dispersed the enemy. Leaving about 600 people killed and wounded on the battlefield, the Khan's army turned to flight.

On July 13, the army camped 28 kilometers from Karasubazar. Here, it was attacked by select troops commanded personally by the Khan. The first onslaught of the enemy was initially very strong, but after an hour, the Tatars were repelled and driven into the mountains by the Cossacks and Kalmyks, who pursued them for 16 kilometers. The army remained in the same camp. However, the Cossacks and Kalmyks made a raid towards Karasubazar to plunder Tatar dwellings. They returned the same day with 600 prisoners, good loot, and a large number of cattle.

On July 14, another battle took place in the vicinity of Karasubazar, also ending in a Russian victory. General-ensign Gustaf Otto Douglas, commanding the vanguard of 6,000 men, moved towards the town of Karasubazar. The field marshal followed him with the army, leaving the sick in the camp with a covering force of 5,000 men under the command of Brigadier Kolokoltsev. Just before Karasubazar, Douglas encountered a 15-thousand-strong Tatar-Ottoman detachment. Lacy sent two dragoon regiments to aid the vanguard. After an hour-long battle, the Turks fled.

== Aftermath ==
Following the occupation of Karasubazar, Russian forces pursued retreating Crimean detachments towards Bakhchysarai, employing scorched-earth tactics to weaken the Crimean Khanate's infrastructure and logistical capabilities. Despite logistical constraints and the onset of epidemics, Russian operations were largely successful in achieving their strategic objectives.

The campaign's conclusion saw Lacy's forces withdrawing from Crimea through the Chonhar Peninsula, marking the end of active hostilities. Despite the challenges faced during the campaign, Russia's military actions in Crimea demonstrated its growing influence in the region and highlighted the vulnerability of Ottoman control over the Crimean Peninsula.

Meanwhile, the Ottoman government, recognizing the failures of 1736 and 1737, reinstated Menli II Giray as Khan of the Crimean Khanate, acknowledging his previous success as a ruler. This decision reflected the Ottoman Empire's efforts to stabilize its control over Crimea amidst increasing Russian military pressure.

== See also ==
- Peter Lacy
- Crimean Khanate
- Zaporozhian Sich
- Kalmyk Khanate
- Don Cossacks

== Sources ==
- Nelipovich, Sergei (2010). Союз двуглавых Орлов: русско-австрийский военный альянс в XVIII веке [The Union of Double-headed Eagles: the Russian-Austrian military Alliance in the XVIII century] (in Russian). Moscow: Квадрига. ISBN 978-5-91791-045-1.
- Bayov Aleksey Konstantinovich, The Russian army during the reign of Empress Anna Ivnnovna. The war between Russia and Turkey in 1736-1739 Volume I, 1906. ISBN 551942120X
- The Battle of Salgir 1737, The Great Russian Encyclopedia, 2004–2017. ISBN 5852703648
- Viskovatov, Alexander Vasilyevich, The military operations of the Russian rowing fleet, under the command of Vice-Admiral Bredahl, in the Sea of Azov, in 1736, 1737 and 1738, St. Petersburg, 1830.
- Sergei R. Grinevetsky, The Black Sea Encyclopedia, 2015 ISBN 9783642552267
