= Gustaf Otto Douglas =

Swedish mercenary of Scottish descent (1687-1771)

Gustaf Douglas
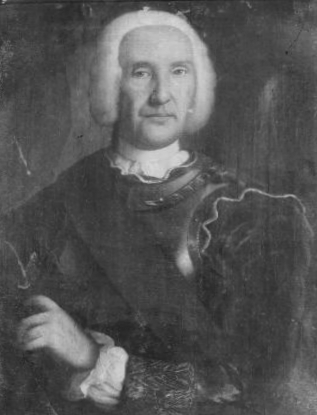
- Born: 23 February 1687
- Died: 2 February 1771 (aged 83)
- Allegiance: 1709 (Swedish Empire); 1732–1737 (Russian Empire)
- Conflicts: Great Northern War; Battle of Poltava; Battle of Chechen-Aul; Lacy's campaign to Crimea

Count Gustaf (also Gustav) Otto Douglas (23 February 1687 – 2 February 1771) was a Swedish mercenary of Scottish descent.

== Biography ==
He was the grandson of Robert Douglas, Count of Skenninge. He was captured by the Russian army in the Battle of Poltava during the rout of the Swedish troops and was eventually employed by Peter the Great during the Great Northern War.

In 1717, Douglas was appointed General Governor of Finland and ensured the stability of the local administration. However, his repressive policy in the region made him extremely unpopular and feared among the Finnish population. As the Governor General of an occupied province, Douglas deported thousands of civilians from Finland to Russia in order to put them to forced labour or military service and floated the idea of sending about 20,000 Finns to help with the construction of Saint Petersburg. His administration in a war-ravaged country was also overshadowed by epidemics of plague, which were often caused by troop movements and famines in the Europe of the eighteenth century.

In 1732, he was tasked with putting down a rebellion in the North Caucasus. Together with 1,700 soldiers, he occupied the key town of Endirey, after which he sent a 500-strong column to the town of Chechen–Aul, one of the centers of the rebels. The column was ambushed, surrounded and destroyed, however. In 1737, Douglas took part in Lacy's campaign to Crimea.

He was the owner of the Albu Manor, the oldest manor in Järva County, Estonia, at the time of its completion in 1742.

Political offices
Preceded by Karl Nieroth	Governor-General of Finland; 1717–1721	Succeeded by Johan Balthasar von Campenhausen
