= Muhammad Turlov =

Senior Prince of Chechnya
- Reign: 1690s
- Predecessor: Tururav II Turlov
- Successor: Amirkhamza Turlov
- Dynasty: Turlov dynasty
- Father: Alikhan Turlov

Muhammad Turlov, also known as Bammat (Note: Also spelled Bamat, Bammad or Bamad) was a prince of the Turlov dynasty. He ruled the Turlov Principality in the 1690s. Muhammad's son, Khasbulat Bamatov, would become one of the future Senior Princes of the principality. Muhammad may have had a daughter by the name Kiztaman, who was married to Aidemir Bardykhanov, also a future Senior Prince of the Turlov Principality. His father was Alikhan Turlov, who reigned over the Principality in the 1670s. Infortmation about the biography of Muhammad is lacking however, some accounts suggest he might be of Kabardian origin.
