= Novye Atagi =

Village in Shalinsky District, Chechnya, Russia

Coordinates: 43°08′N 45°46′E

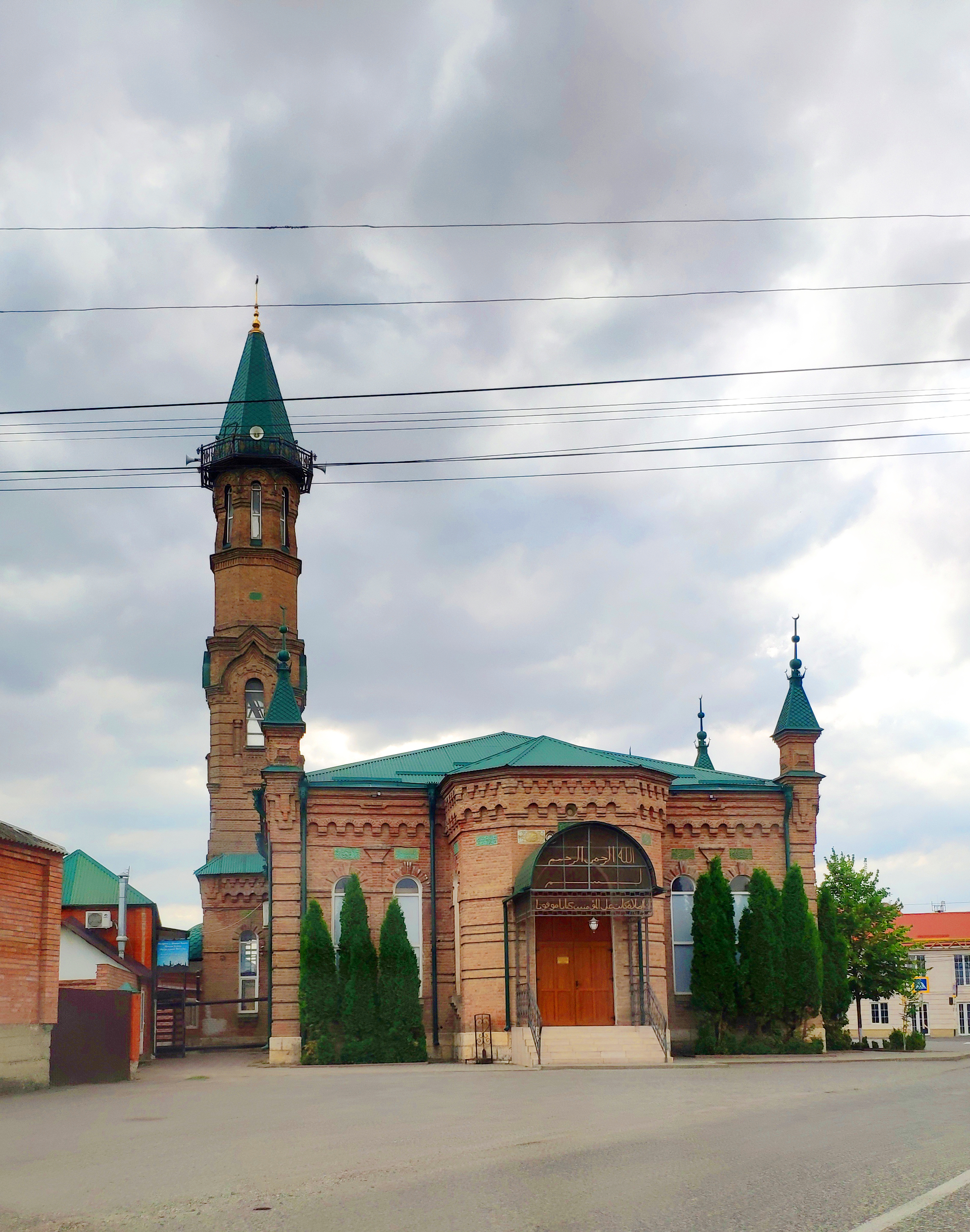

Novye Atagi (Russian: Но́вые Атаги́: Chechen: Жима АтагӀа, Ƶima Ataġa) is a rural locality (a selo) in Shalinsky District of the Chechen Republic, Russia, located 20 kilometers (12 mi) south of Grozny. Population: 8,728 (2010 census); 8,741 (2002 census).

Novye Atagi is separated from Starye Atagi by the Argun River. The Khasavyurt Accord was signed in the settlement.

== See also ==
- ICRC Hospital of Novye Atagi
