= Tururav II Turlov =

Senior Prince of Chechnya
- Reign: c. 1680s – 1690s
- Predecessor: Bartikhan Turlov
- Successor: Muhammad Turlov
- Dynasty: Turlov dynasty
- Father: Zagashtuk Turlov

Tururav II Turlov was a prince from the Turlov dynasty and the Senior Prince of the Turlov Principality from approximately the 1680s to 1690s. He was the son of Zagashtuk Turlov while his own son, Amirkhamza Turlov would become one of the future Senior Princes of the Turlov state. He succeeded Bartikhan Turlov as the Senior Prince of the Turlov Principality and was succeeded by Muhammad Turlov. Nothing is known about his reign, however.
