= Battle of Chechen-Aul =

1732 military conflict in Chechen-Aul

- Part of 1732 Insurgency in Chechnya
Date	7th July 1732
Location	Chechen–Aul, Chechen Principality (Modern–day Chechen–Aul of Chechnya) 43°12′12″N 45°47′00″E
Result	Chechen rebel victory; Khasbulat Bamatov killed; Aidemir Bardykhanov becomes new senior prince of Chechnya

Belligerents
Chechen rebels	Russian Empire

Commanders and leaders
Aidemir Bardykhanov	(Russian Empire) Colonel Kokh; Khasbulat Bamatov †

Strength
10,000	500: 300 Russian troops; 200 Cossacks

Casualties and losses
Less	200: 125 killed; 75 wounded

The Battle of Chechen-Aul was an ambush conducted by Chechen rebels led by Aidemir Bardykhanov on the retreating Russian army led by Colonel Kokh on the 7th of July, 1732. It resulted in a major Chechen victory, the destruction of the Russian detachment, and the death of Khasbulat Bamatov, the senior Chechen prince. According to popular legends, the battle was the origin of the Chechen ethnonym.

== History ==
In 1732, riots and uprisings broke out across the North Caucasus against the Tsarist administration, most notably in Chechnya and the Endirey Khanate. On July 4, a Russian detachment, of between 1,500 and 1,700 (1,200 Russian troops, 300–500 Cossacks) was sent from the Holy Cross fortress, led by Gustaf Otto Douglas, to crush the rebels and restore stability. In the detachment was also Khasbulat Bamatov, the senior Chechen prince of the Principality of Chechnya, who was known for his pro–Russian orientation. He acted as a guide for the detachment, showing them the routes through the region.

While on his way to the Kumyk town Endirey, Douglas received false information that the rebel army, knowing of the arrival of Russian troops, dispersed throughout the region. Deceived by the false news, Douglas only sent 500 soldiers (300 Russian troops, 200 Cossacks) led by Colonel Kokh to the rebellious town of Chechen–Aul, while he and the main army remained at Endirey.

In the detachment of Kokh was also Khasbulat Bamatov, who, not only wanted to restore stability to his state, but also wanted to expel his rival, Aidemir Bardykhanov.

Upon arrival at Chechen–Aul, Russian troops burnt the town down and began retreating right after. However, after entering the dense forest next to Chechen–Aul, the detachment was suddenly surrounded and ambushed by Chechen fighters led by Aidemir himself.

As a result, the Russian detachment was destroyed and dispersed, with around 125 soldiers killed and 75 wounded. Khasbulat was also killed by Chechen fighters. While the exact amount of losses on the rebel side is unknown, they were less than the Russian casualties.

"One must think, firstly," wrote Zisserman, "that Douglas succumbed to a false rumor about the flight of the enemy crowd, and secondly, that he had no idea about the forest war with the Chechens, deciding to send 500 men, instead of going with the entire column, and thirdly some kind of disorder occurred during the retreat, otherwise it is difficult to explain to oneself such a relatively significant loss." As for the tactics used by the Chechen fighters, Zisserman reports that they "Kept their system: Retreat during our offense and angrily attack during our own retreat."

The result of the battle was a major Chechen victory and had huge effects on the future of the Chechens and the Chechen principality. As a result of the death of senior prince Khasbulat, Aidemir Bardykhanov was recognized as the new senior prince of the Chechen principality. However, the death of Khasbulat led to the weakening of the state and further conflicts between the Aidemirovs and Khasbulatovs would be one of the main reason for the principality's collapse.

Later that year, Khasbulat's son, Alibek Khasbulatov, invaded the principality and plundered it as revenge for his father's death.

The Chechens also preserve many folk tales about the battle. Common tradition has it that this battle is how the Chechens got their name — a battle which ended in the Russian side suffering a heavy defeat. The word "Chechen", however, has been used as early as 1692 and the word "Chechnya" as early as 1719.
