= New Zealand Red Cross =

New Zealand humanitarian organization

- Rīpeka Whero Aotearoa
- Logo of the New Zealand Red Cross

- Flag of the NZRC
- Predecessor: The New Zealand Branch of the British Red Cross Society
- Formation: 1911; 115 years ago
- Founder: The Earl of Liverpool, then the Governor General of the Dominion of New Zealand, arranged a meeting to officially co-ordinate Red Cross groups.
- Type: Non-governmental organisation
- Legal status: Charity
- Purpose: Humanitarianism
- Headquarters: Wellington
- Location: 69 Molesworth Street, Thorndon, Wellington
- Region served: New Zealand, Oceania & Asia
- Secretary General: Sarah Stuart-Black, QSO
- National President: LTCOL (retired) John Dyer, NZGD
- Parent organization: International Federation of Red Cross and Red Crescent Societies
- Staff: 500
- Volunteers: 9,000
- Website: www.redcross.org.nz

New Zealand Red Cross or Rīpeka Whero Aotearoa is a humanitarian organisation, which has more than 9,000 members and volunteers. In New Zealand, Red Cross delivers core community services, such as Meals on Wheels, refugee re-settlement services, first aid courses, and emergency management operations. Internationally, New Zealand Red Cross sends international delegates overseas to assist in areas where humanitarian assistance is needed, this includes disaster preparedness and response. In 2013, 17 delegates were sent to the Philippines in the aftermath of Typhoon Haiyan and in 2014, 18 New Zealand delegates responded to the Ebola epidemic in West Africa.

== History ==
Ad hoc activity on behalf of the Red Cross began in New Zealand in 1914, at the outbreak of World War I. After a number of enquiries, New Zealand's first Governor-General Lord Liverpool convened a meeting of Red Cross and St John representatives in Wellington on 10 November 1915. This led to the formation of a national office and Council, and the emergence of the New Zealand Branch of the British Red Cross, known from 1917 as the "New Zealand branch of the British Red Cross Society and the Order of St John". Red Cross raised money and organised medical supplies, clothing and food parcels for sick and wounded soldiers overseas and once they returned home. They also helped during the influenza epidemic in 1918 by training nurses and providing medical supplies and relief.

Although Red Cross personnel had previously responded to floods and to the Murchison earthquake of 1929, the Hawke's Bay earthquake of 3 February 1931 raised awareness of the need for a more efficient, centralised response to natural disasters. This awareness, and pressure from the British Red Cross for New Zealand to develop an independent national Society, led to the founding of the New Zealand Red Cross Society by Nurse Beth Charpentier, which was incorporated on 22 December 1931. Recognition by the New Zealand government and the International Committee of the Red Cross/Red Crescent followed in June 1932.

The New Zealand Red Cross Society again teamed up with the Order of St John during World War II as the Joint Council, sending medical relief, supplies, clothing and food to sick and wounded soldiers and New Zealand prisoners of war. In 1990, the Society changed its name to New Zealand Red Cross.

New Zealand Red Cross is registered as a charity in New Zealand.

=== World War II ===
During World War II, the organisation greatly expanded due to the significantly higher number of New Zealanders who were taken as prisoners of war (approximately 9,000, compared to almost 600 in World War I). The New Zealand Red Cross Society provided 1,139,624 parcels during the war period, packed by 1,500 volunteers. Prisoners parcels included:

- Six ounces of tea
- Nineteen ounces of corned mutton
- Fifteen ounces of lamb and green peas
- Eight ounces of chocolate
- Twenty ounces of butter
- Fifteen ounces of coffee and milk
- Ten ounces of sugar
- Nine ounces of peas
- Sixteen ounces of jam
- Sixteen ounces of condensed milk
- Fifteen ounces of cheese
- Six ounces of raisins.

Members of the New Zealand Red Cross visited prisoner of war camps during World War II, to inspect conditions.

=== Louisa Akavi ===
One notable New Zealand Red Cross nurse is Louisa Akavi, who has been held hostage by Islamic State militants since her kidnapping in October 2013. Both New Zealand Red Cross and New Zealand Government have ruled out paying her ransom to Islamic State forces. New Zealand military and intelligence forces were dispatched to Iraq as part of efforts to locate and rescue her. In mid-April 2019, New Zealand Red Cross publicly disclosed Akavi's kidnapping to the New Zealand and international media and public.

== New Zealand Red Cross programmes ==
=== International delegates ===
New Zealand Red Cross has been sending ordinary New Zealanders overseas to help out where the need is greatest since 1937. Dr Robert Grey of Auckland and Dr Hector Tremewan of Wellington were sent to China during the Sino-Japanese war to help in medical centres and refugee camps. Since then hundreds of international delegates have been sent overseas to help in conflicts and disasters in roles such as communications, emergency telecommunications, health and first aid, security, organisational preparedness and water and sanitation.

New Zealand Red Cross international delegates are seconded to the IFRC and the International Committee of the Red Cross (ICRC). New Zealand Red Cross recruits, trains and provides delegates for the ICRC. It is one of only a small number of national societies to do this worldwide.

=== Canterbury Earthquakes Recovery Programme ===
Following the September 2010 and February 2011 earthquakes, New Zealand Red Cross has been committed to helping the recovery efforts in Canterbury. Red Cross's two appeals for the earthquakes raised a combined $128 million, which is the largest New Zealand Red Cross appeal since World War II. New Zealanders alone gave more than $100 million to the appeal. New Zealand Red Cross has now helped one in four Cantabrians (more than 100,000 people), given out $91 million in grants and spent $11 million on recovery programmes. Programmes range from repairing quake-damaged homes, such as the "Let's Find and Fix" campaign, to Winter Warmer Packs and Supporting Schools. New Zealand Red Cross has also facilitated psychosocial support since the earthquakes to those in need.

=== Meals on Wheels ===
The Meals On Wheels programme was started in June 1951 by the North Canterbury Red Cross Centre during a gas, coal and electricity shortage when the volunteers decided to make soup for people in need. A local café proprietor, offered to cook stock for the soup and deliver it for free and a local butcher supplied the bones and meat for the soup to Red Cross free of charge. In 2014, 544,843 meals were delivered around New Zealand.

=== First aid ===
Since the influenza epidemic, New Zealand Red Cross has been involved in first aid training in New Zealand, with formal qualifications beginning in the 1920s. There were multiple courses available including first aid, home nursing and motherhood. New Zealand Red Cross holds an NZQA Category One First Aid Training Provider certification and trains over 135,000 New Zealanders. They also sell injury specific first aid kits, AED (automated external defibrillator) products and training equipment.

On First Aid Day 2014 (13 September), New Zealand Red Cross launched a first aid and emergency app. The app provides step-by-step information on how to respond to emergency situations specific to New Zealand.

=== Disaster management ===
New Zealand Red Cross has a network of emergency response volunteers in New Zealand who are taught how to react to different disasters and help New Zealanders in need. They work closely with the Ministry of Civil Defence and Emergency Management (MCDEM). There are currently 19 New Zealand Red Cross Disaster, Welfare and Support Teams (DWSTs), which are made up entirely of volunteers. These teams take part in disaster simulation exercises throughout New Zealand, such as earthquake or cyclone scenarios, to ensure they are prepared.

New Zealand Red Cross has responded to national disasters such as the Christchurch earthquakes, the Hawke's Bay earthquake, the Tangiwai disaster, the Wahine disaster and most recently the June 2015 floods.

=== Red Cross Shops ===
Red Cross Shops started during World War I, with the first shop opening in Cathedral Square on 1 June 1915. There are now 53 Red Cross shops in New Zealand, which are staffed by 1,400 volunteers. The shops sell second hand goods and all the money raised is used to fund New Zealand Red Cross operations.

=== Refugee services ===
New Zealand Red Cross members first sent goods to refugees overseas. The arrival of 733 Polish refugee children and 102 adults on 1 November 1944 was the first refugee resettlement programme the New Zealand Red Cross participated in. Since then, activities to welcome and support new settlers have been an ongoing feature of Red Cross efforts. In 2013, New Zealand Red Cross merged with Refugee Services. Each year around 750 refugees are welcomed to New Zealand through the United Nations Resettlement Programme. A 'Refugee of the Year' award was introduced to both promote the plight of refugees and award deserving people.

New Zealand Red Cross, which has a contract with the government, is the primary agency supporting quota refugees in New Zealand. They provide core resettlement services in Auckland, Hamilton, Palmerston North, Wellington and Nelson. A new programme called Pathways to Employment was started by New Zealand Red Cross in 2014 to help people with refugee backgrounds find work and reach their career goals.

=== Red Cross Red Crescent Movement ===
New Zealand Red Cross is part of the largest humanitarian organisation in the world, the International Federation of the Red Cross/Red Crescent (IFRC). The International Red Cross and Red Crescent Movement has more than 97 million volunteers worldwide.

== See also ==
- Humanitarianism
- International humanitarian law
