= Starye Atagi =

Rural locality in Groznensky District, Grozny Oblast, Russia

Coordinates: 43°07′N 45°44′E

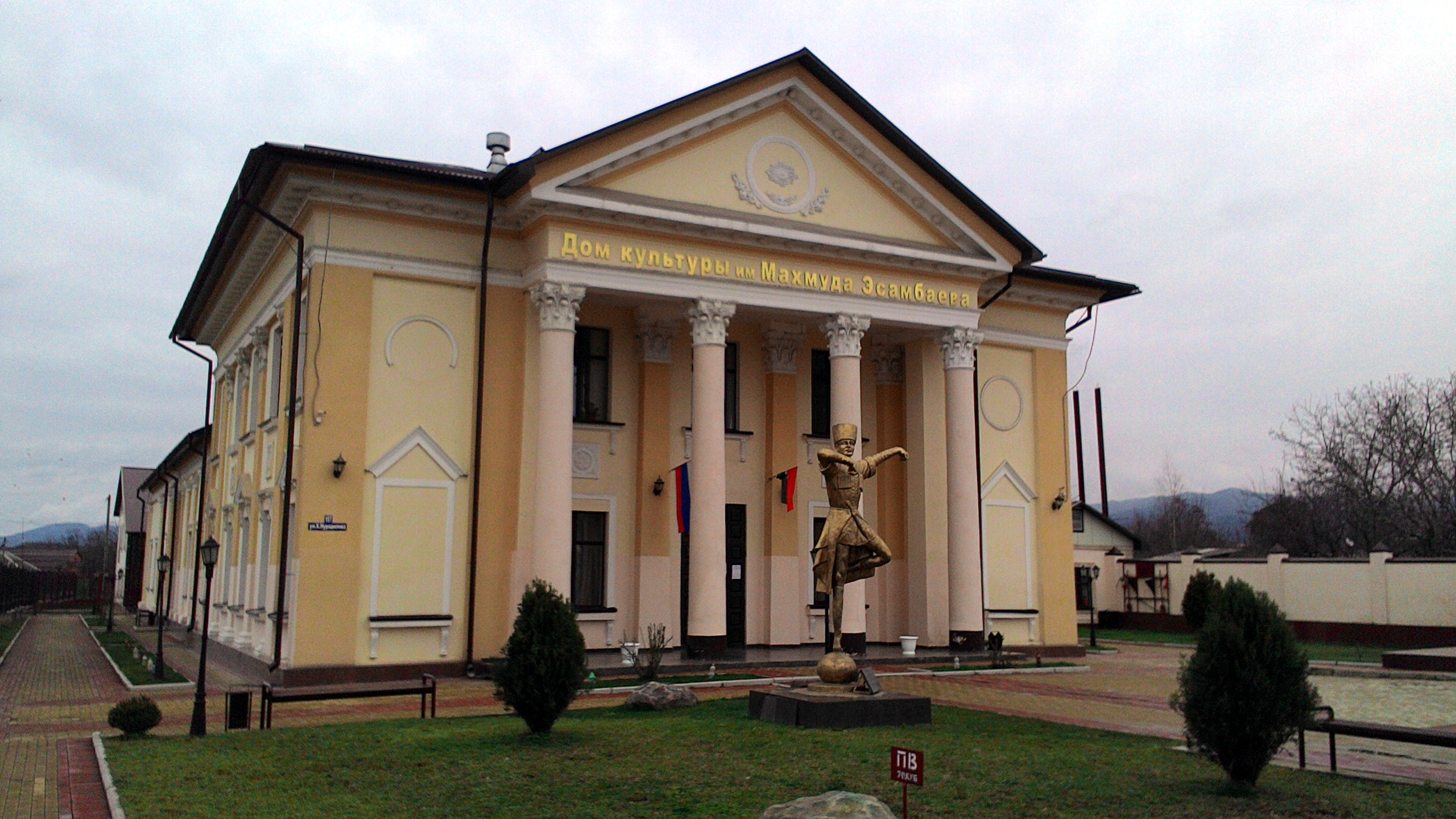
House of culture in the village of Starye Atagi

Starye Atagi (Russian: Ста́рые Атаги́; Chechen: Йоккха Атагӏа, Сехьа Атагӏа, Yokqa Ataġa, Seẋa Ataġa) is a rural locality (a selo) in Groznensky District of the Chechen Republic, Russia, located 10 kilometers (6.2 mi) south of Grozny, the republic's capital. Population: 10,884 (2010 census); 10,161 (2002 census).

Starye Atagi is separated from Novye Atagi by the Argun River.
