= Chechen-Aul =

Rural locality in Chechnya

Chechen-Aul Чечен-Аул Between 1944–1957: Калиновка (Russian)
- Selo

Other transcription(s)
  - Chechen: Чечана
  - Russian: Between 1944–1957: Калиновка
- Interactive map of Chechen-Aul
- Location of Chechen-Aul Chechen-Aul (Chechnya)
- Coordinates: 43°12′12″N 45°47′00″E
- Country: Russia
- Federal subject: Chechnya
- Established: c. 1650

Government
  - Leader: Ismail Demilkhanov
- Elevation: 202 m (663 ft)

Population (2010 Census)
  - Total: 8,233
  - Estimate (2021): 9,208 (+11.8%)

Administrative status
  - Subordinated to: Argun urban okrug
- Time zone: UTC+3 (MSK)
- Postal code: 366022
- OKTMO ID: 96702000116

Chechen-Aul (Note: Russian: Чечен–Аул, Chechen: Чечана, romanized: Çeçana) is a rural locality (a selo) in Argun urban okrug of the Republic of Chechnya, Russia, located on the left bank of the Argun River near Grozny. Until 1 January 2020, the village was part of the Groznensky District as part of the Chechen-Aul rural settlement.

== Geography ==
The village is located at the southern foot of the Grozny Range, on the left bank of the Argun River, 8 km southeast of the city of Grozny. On the northern outskirts of Chechen–Aul is the mountain Zhemin–Barz.

The village of Elikhanov and Sheikh Iznaura are located to the Northwest of Chechen–Aul, the village Berdykel to the Northeast, Belgatoy to the East, Novye Atagi and Starye Atagi to the South and Goyty to the Southwest.

== History ==
According to Chechen legends, a man named Chainak, who came from the Ichkerian village Gunoy, raided the Shamkhalate of Tarki and captured and married Checha, the daughter of the local ruler (called Shamkhal). After the death of Chainak, she and her sons left the mountains of Gunoy and moved to the plain, where, between the Sunzha and Argun Rivers, they founded a farm, which they named Chechana. The name later changed to Chechan–Aul/Chechen–Aul, with "Aul" meaning a town or fortified village.

In 1732, a battle was fought near Chechen–Aul between Russian forces and Chechen rebels. It ended in a victory for the Chechens and according to popular tradition, this battle is how the term "Chechen" came into use. The term has been used as early as 1692, however.

Between 1944 and 1957, after the Deportation of the Chechens and Ingush, the village was renamed to "Kalinovka". After the Restoration of Chechen-Ingush autonomy, the village got its former name back.
