= Ayuka Khan =

Kalmyk Khan from 1690 to 1724

- Kalmyk Khan
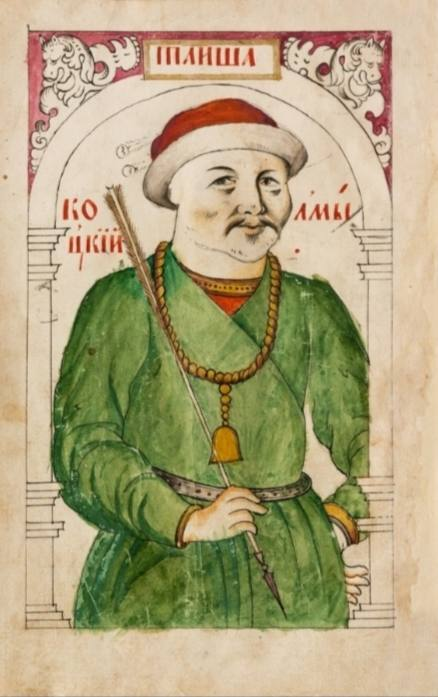
- Portrait in the Tsarsky titulyarnik, 1670s

Taishi of Kalmyks
- Reign: 1672–1690
- Coronation: 1672
- Predecessor: Monchak

Khan of the Kalmyk Khanate
- Reign: 1690–1724
- Successor: Tseren Donduk Khan
- Born: 1642
- Died: 1724 (aged 81–82)
- Father: Monchak
- Religion: Tibetan Buddhism

Ayuka or Ayuki Khan (Mongolian: Аюук Хан, romanized: Ayuuk Khan; 1669–1724) was a Kalmyk leader under whose rule the Kalmyk Khanate reached its zenith in terms of economic, military, and politic power. On behalf of Russia, Ayuka Khan protected the southern borders of Russia, engaging in many military expeditions against the peoples of Central Asia, the North Caucasus, and Crimea.

Kalmyk troops invaded Bashkirs with Kazan and Orenburg Bashkir Uprising (1681–1684). Then the Russian government sent to negotiate for Ayuka Prince Golitsyn Alexei Ivanovich. These negotiations failed to stop the Russian attacks Kalmyks and keep Ayuka Khan of friendly relations with the Porte, the Crimea and Persia.

Russian authorities in an effort to strengthen its influence in the Lower Volga, supported Ayuka Khan and used his troops during the suppression of the Astrakhan (1705–1706) and Bulavin (1707–1709) uprisings, as well as in the Great Northern War (1700–1721), and the Russo-Persian War (1722–1723). For the latter war, to honor his service, he received a golden sword and a belt covered with precious stones by Peter I.

Ayuka Khan, restoring peaceful relations with the Russian kingdom, turned his attention to the east. Ayuka Khan undertook military campaign against the Kazakh and Turkmen, making them their tributaries. Part Mangyshlak Turkmens were displaced Ayuka Khan the Volga, to the same period include his successful war with Dagestanis, Kumyks, Kabardians and Kuban. In 1690, the Dalai Lama bestowed Kalmyk taisha Ayuka Khan's title with a seal.

== See also ==
- Brigitta Scherzenfeldt
