= Yahya-Hadji Zhangurazov =

Balkar Islamic scholar and community leader

Ahya Hadji Zhangurazov
- Яхья-Хаджи Жангъуразлан
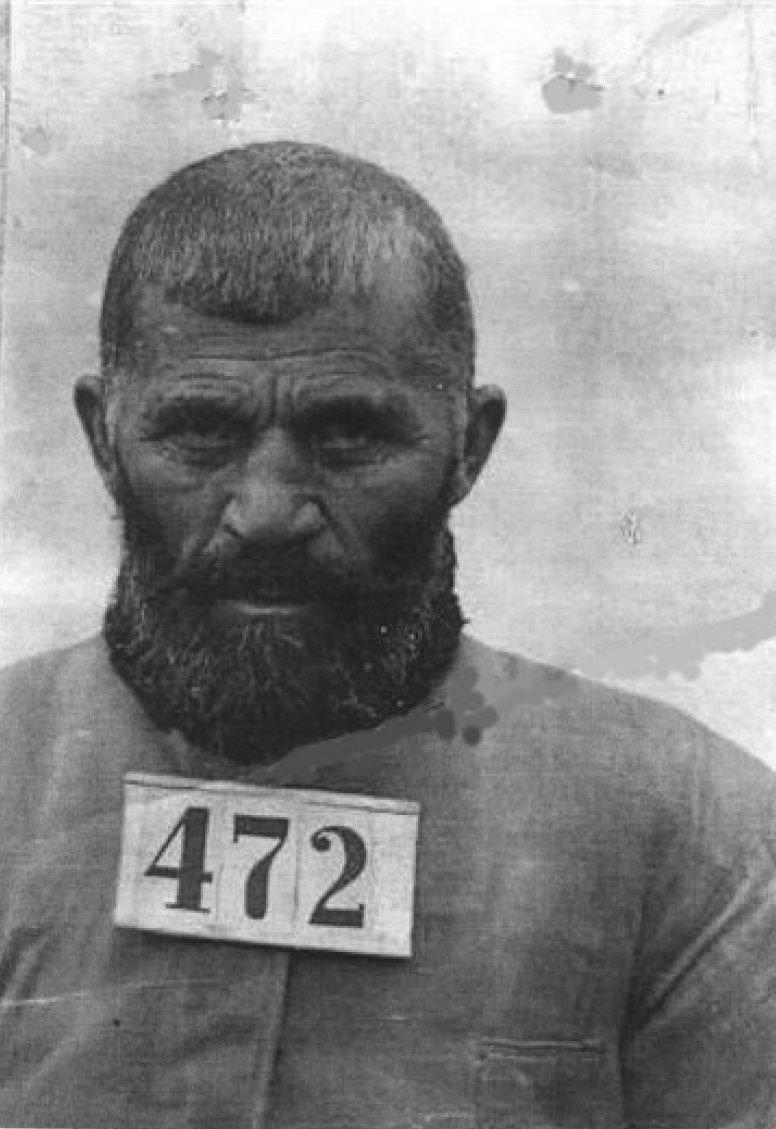
- Yahya-Hadji Zhangurazov, photographed in 1926 following his imprisonment.
- Born: 1870; Kyunnyum, Nalchiksky okrug, Terek oblast, Russian Empire
- Died: 1934 (63-64 years old) near Doguat, Kabardino-Balkarian AO, Russian SFSR, Soviet Union
- Occupations: Abrek and Prominent Islamic figure of the Balkar people
- Years active: 1917-1934
- Known for: His resistance against Soviet Union
- Title: National Hero of Karachay-Balkars
- Criminal charges: From 1926 to 1929 he was in exile on charges of anti-Soviet activities
- Family: ~Tavshur-Hadji Zhangurazov (father); ~Osman Zhangurazov (brother)

Yahya-Hadji Zhangurazov (Karachay-Balkar: Ахья-Хаджи Жангъуразлан, romanized: Yahya-Hadji Jang’urazlan, lit. ‘Yahya-Hadji, son of Zhanguraz’; Russian: Яхья-Хаджи Жангуразов) also known by his nasab Yahya-Hadji ibn Zhanguraz was a distinguished Islamic scholar, community leader, and national hero of the Balkar people. Born in 1870 in the village of Kyunnyum in Upper Balkaria, his life was marked by devotion to Islamic education, justice, and the defense of his people against both feudal oppression and Soviet totalitarianism. His steadfast principles and resistance to Soviet power earned him immense respect but also persecution and eventual martyrdom.

== Early life and education ==
Ahya was the fifth child of Tavshur-bey and was recognized from a young age for his determination and intellect. His father sent him to receive a religious education, first studying with local Islamic scholars and later in Dagestan, where he developed a deep appreciation for Arabic and Islamic sciences. During his studies, he also explored the history of the Caucasian War and the legacy of Imam Shamil, which profoundly shaped his views on resistance and self-determination.

Ahya’s quest for knowledge took him beyond the Caucasus, including pilgrimages to Mecca and Medina, where he furthered his education and gained spiritual insights. After completing his studies, he returned to Balkaria as a respected Qadi (Sharia judge) and preacher, renowned for his fairness and dedication to Islamic principles.

== Resistance against Soviets ==
The late 19th and early 20th centuries were tumultuous for the Balkar people, with political unrest and land disputes intensifying. Ahya’s leadership became pivotal during these times. Initially cautious about revolutionary movements, he briefly supported the Bolsheviks in 1918, believing their promises of equality and justice. However, disillusioned by their anti-religious policies, he withdrew his support and warned his community of the dangers of Soviet atheism and repression.

Ahya’s defiance of Soviet authority made him a target. After multiple attempts to arrest him were thwarted by his supporters, he was finally exiled in 1926 on fabricated charges. Despite the hardships of imprisonment and exile, he returned to Balkaria in 1929, only to find an atmosphere of heightened surveillance and betrayal. Forced to flee again, Ahya joined the ranks of the abrek (mountain rebels) and became a leader of the Mujahideen resistance against Soviet oppression.

== Later life and legacy ==
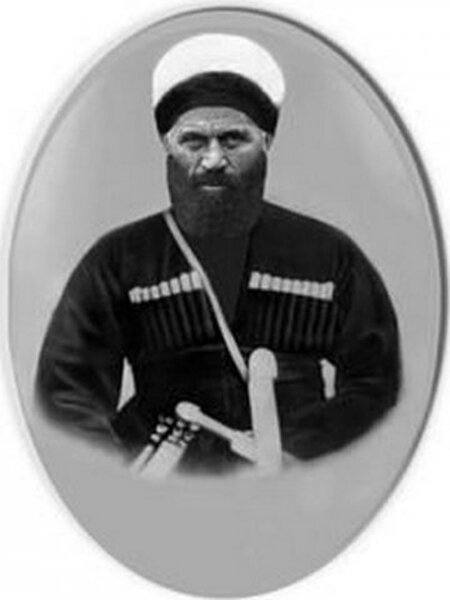
Edited photo of Yahya-Hadji Zhangurazov into traditional Caucasian clothes

For five years, Ahya and his group of rebels evaded Soviet forces, enduring the harsh and unforgiving conditions of the Caucasus mountains. His unwavering faith and moral authority deeply inspired those around him, earning him the respect and loyalty of his comrades. In 1934, following a betrayal by an informant, Ahya and his group were discovered in their hideout near Doguat. That morning, Ahya woke up to perform his prayer. As he was praying, the Soviets launched their attack. Despite the chaos and overwhelming odds, Ahya refused to abandon his prayer, remaining steadfast in his devotion. He was ultimately shot and killed while in the act of worship, his faith unbroken even in the face of death.

The Soviet authorities desecrated Ahya’s body, displaying it publicly to intimidate the Balkar people. His remains were buried without proper Islamic rites in an unmarked crypt. It was not until 1957, after the Balkars returned from Stalin-era deportations, that his niece reburied him according to Islamic traditions. A gravestone was erected in his honor in 2006.

Ahya Hadji Zhangurazov’s life symbolizes the resilience and spiritual strength of the Balkar people. His commitment to justice and his refusal to compromise his beliefs made him a martyr in the eyes of his community. His legacy endures as a reminder of the struggles faced by the Balkars and their enduring quest for dignity and self-determination.
