= La Vieille Fille =

La Vieille Fille may refer to:

- La Vieille Fille (novel), 1836 novel
- La Vieille Fille (1972 film), French film
