= AKBA =

AKBA or Akba may refer to:

- acetyl-keto-beta-boswellic acid, a group of boswellic acid
- American Karachay-Kavkaz Benevolent Association
