= Frances Sarah Guidoboni-Visconti =

English socialite (1804–1883)

- Born: Frances Sarah Lovell; 27 September 1804; Cole Park, Wiltshire, England
- Died: 28 April 1883 (aged 78); Versailles, Yvelines, France
- Other names: Sarah; Fanny; Madame de Visconti
- Spouse: Count Emilio Guidoboni-Visconti (m. 1825)

Countess Frances Sarah Guidoboni-Visconti (née Lovell; 27 September 1804 – 28 April 1883) was an English socialite in France. A benefactor of the French writer Honoré de Balzac, she inspired the character Lady Dudley in his novel The Lily of the Valley (1835).

== Biography ==
Frances Sarah Lovell was the third daughter of Charlotte (née Willes) and Peter Harvey Lovell of Cole Park, Wiltshire and an English gentry family. In July 1825, she married the Milanese Count Emilio Guidoboni-Visconti at Malmesbury Abbey. Her husband devoted much of his time to music. They lived between the Avenue de Neuilly (the future Champs-Élysées) in Paris and the Rue Champ Lagarde in Versailles.

In 1835 during a reception at the Austrian embassy, Guidoboni-Visconti met the French writer Honoré de Balzac. She was described as blonde and beautiful.

The Guidoboni-Viscontis provided financial support to Balzac, lending him over ₣10,000. During this time, she furnished and sublet flats on the Rue du Faubourg Saint-Honoré. The countess and Balzac spent a great deal of time together, and he was rumoured to have fathered her second son Lionel, although these rumours were not substantiated. Balzac defended his friendship with the Countess to Ewelina Hańska, stating she supported him.

Balzac shared the manuscript for his 1837 novel La Vieille Fille with her. Balzac dedicated his 1839 novel Béatrix to "Sarah". She later moved to Versailles, after which Balzac claimed his affair with the "anglaise" was over.

She died in Versailles.
