= Balkars =

North Caucasian Turkic ethnic group

Balkars Малкъарлыла
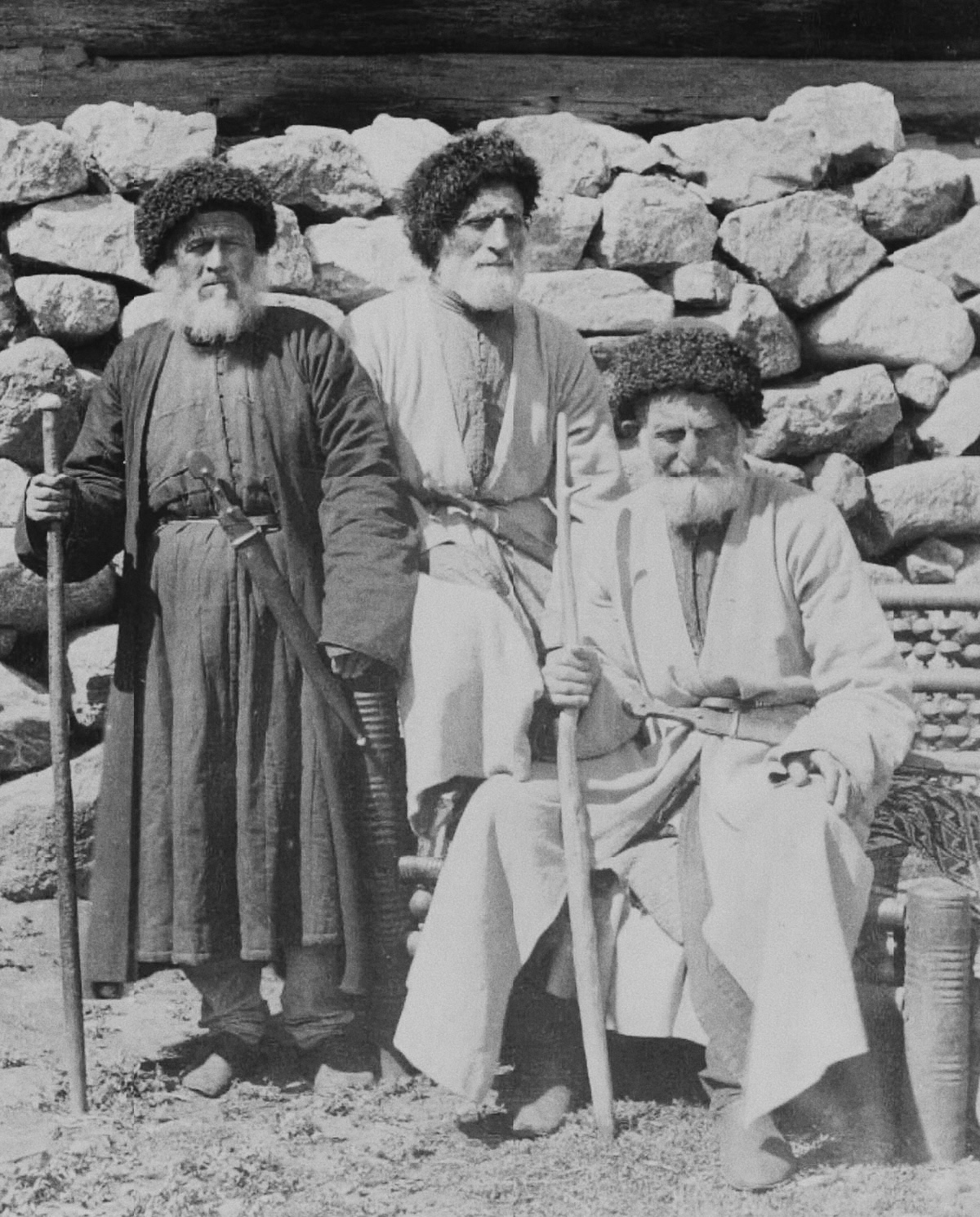
- Balkar elders from Baksan, 1885

Total population
- c. 135,000

Regions with significant populations
- Russia: Kabardino-Balkaria: 125,044; 120,898
- United States: 3,000 - 4,000
- Turkey: 1,000
- Kazakhstan: 2,600
- Kyrgyzstan: 1,500
- Uzbekistan: 900

Languages
- Karachay-Balkar; Russian

Religion
- Sunni Islam

Related ethnic groups
- Karachays; Kumyks; Crimean Tatars; North Caucasian peoples

Balkars (Karachay-Balkar: малкъарлыла, romanized: malqarlıla or аланла, romanized: alanla or таулула, romanized: tawlula, lit. 'mountaineers') are a Turkic ethnic group in the North Caucasus region, one of the titular populations of Kabardino-Balkaria.

Their Karachay-Balkar language is of the Ponto-Caspian subgroup of the Northwestern (Kipchak) group of Turkic languages.

== Identity ==
The modern Balkars are a Turkic-Caucasian people, who share their language with the Karachays from Karachay-Cherkessia and have strong lingual similarities with Kumyks from Dagestan. Balkars and Karachays are sometimes referred to as a single ethnicity.

== History ==
=== Ethnogenesis ===
The ethnogenesis of the Balkars, alongside their Karachay neighbours, is dubbed as "one of the most difficult problems in Caucasian studies", which historians have debated, but some theories, in part, may have been from:

- Ancient Caucasian peoples like the Circassians, Georgians, Durdzuks, and Armenians.
- The Oghuric Bulgars and Khazars who lived in Old Great Bulgaria and Khazar Khaganate. Batbayan was the only one of Kubrat's sons who remained in the Caucasus, while his four brothers moved from North Caucasus and went to the Balkans, the Italian Peninsula and the Volga River; one such entity would become Bulgaria, which was also established by the same Bulgar Turkic people but underwent massive Slavicization to become the Slavic Bulgarians.
- The intrusion of the Iranian tribe Alans during the 8th century, and the first wave of Kipchak with their Cuman allies' migration later on. Alania had its capital in Maghas, which some authors and historians locate at today’s Arkhyz, in the mountains currently inhabited by the Karachay-Balkar, while others place it in either what is now modern Ingushetia or North Ossetia.
- The result of Tokhtamysh–Timur war in 1395, which saw Timur crushed Tokhtamysh's Kipchak soldiers and routed them to the mountains; these second wave Kipchaks, now Islamised and distinct from the first Kipchak and ancient Oghur migration, brought with them their Borjigin Turco-Mongol heritage and intermarriages with various tribes, contributed to the Kipchakisation of some group of North Caucasian peoples to form the modern Karachays and Balkars, whose identities are a combination of native Caucasian-Iranian and also of partial (but significant) Turco-Mongol lineage.

While acknowledging contributions by Bulgars, Khazars, Alans and Kipchaks (among many others), Tavkul (2015) locates the ethnogenesis of Balkars-Karachays and other peoples of the Caucasus inside the Caucasus, not outside.

During the 14th century, Alania was destroyed by Tamerlane as part of the infamous war between the Kipchaks led by Tokhtamysh and the Karluk Timurid Empire. Many of the Alans, Cumans, and Kipchaks migrated westward into Europe; while the majority of remainders fled south, deep into the mountains; some Alan tribes would form the modern Ossetians, who became Orthodox Christians. Nonetheless, Timur's incursion into the North Caucasus introduced the remaining to Islam and the process of intermixing and ethnogenesis, though it was Tokhtamysh's leftover troops that resulted in the formation of what would be the future Karachays and Balkars, whose heritages remain natives to the mountains but also interestingly shared a greater component of Central and Northern Asian heritages than any other Caucasian peoples (except the Kumyks).

Most Balkars adopted Islam in the eighteenth century due to contact with the Kumyks, Circassians, Nogais, and Crimean Tatars. The Balkars are considered deeply religious. The Sufi Qadiriya order has a strong presence in the region.

=== Caucasian War ===
The Balkars and Karachays have been helping the Kabardians in their rebellions since ancient times. Thus, in 1787, Kabard's bailiff wrote: "The Kabardians, in cases of close, always find their shelter and shelter of estates with them (the Balkars)“.

During the uprising in Kabarda of the primary bridles of the Kudenetovs, in the battle of May 9, 1804 on the river Chegem, the Karachays and Balkars came to the rescue, Lieutenant General Glazenap himself in a report to the Russian Emperor Alexander I reported that the battle lasted from 11 a.m. to 6 p.m., noting:

"...Fought in the gorges for the most part with 11,000 desperately fighting Kabardians, Chegemians, Balkars, Karachays and Ossetians knocked out of 12 dug-out auls"

In the subsequent uprising of Kabarda, which was in 1810, the Balkars again did not deny help, on April 30, General Bulgakov reported from the camp to the river Cherek:

"Their armed gathering of more than 2,000 horsemen and as many as pedestrians can be heard, with the help of the Balkars held in two fortified gorges at the foot of the snowy mountains, is locked by me."

The following years did not pass quietly either, the Karachays, for example, were engaged in robbery. In June 1822. Yermolov told Major General Stal:

"I'm sure, Your Excellency, that you will visit them if they continue to rob and don't want to evict"

And so, in 1828, the village of Nezlobnaya was brought together by fugitive Kabardians, Karachays, Balkars and other outer Kubans, on the way back a detachment of highlanders met with imperial forces, and there was a battle, in Georgi Emmanuel's report about these events it is written:

"At the same time, I dare to witness to V.I.V. the excellent courage shown by all our troops, who were in this case, against the selected only in a large number of mountaineers, who were in shells and fought with incredible effort, attacking artillery, such examples have never happened before"

In the same year, Emmanuel undertook an expedition to Karachay, the expedition lasted from October 17 to 29, a contingent was introduced into Karachay, the strength of which was more than 3,000 combat units with 15 guns, the final battle took place on October 20 near the village of Kart-Jurt. In official sources, the losses of Russian Empire amounted to 262 killed and wounded in unofficial sources up to 800 killed and wounded.

After the battle, the Karachay people gave Amanats and accepted the conditions of the Empire:

"1) Obeying the will of Your Excellency, we undertake from now on not to be guilty of anything against Russia, and guilty people, such as: Kabardians and others, not to accept them at all, and not to join them; to always be loyal to the Russian throne and to confirm with an oath, to return everything stolen by us in advance by people, cattle and other property without seizure under oath.

2) In the certificate of the above, we give from the four surnames of the Amanates appointed by you.

3) If a large Circassian army will pass through our lands to invade Russia, which we will not be able to keep, we will not be accused of, but only immediately we are obliged to let us know about it, and we are responsible for those we will be able to keep.

4) If anyone has Muslims like us from the subjects of the Russian Emperor, no matter what claim is against us or we are against them, let us understand our customs, sheriat.

5) For exchange and trade, establish us on the river Kume, near the fortress of Akhandukovskaya, exchange yard, so that we can get salt, iron, goods and bread there and would be allowed to enter Russia according to our needs"

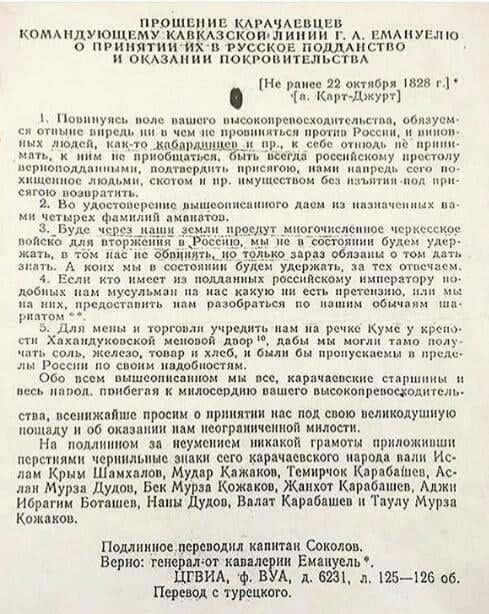
The conditions Russia gave to Karachays

Despite this, in 1830–1831, there was an agreement between the Circassians, Karachays, Balkars and Abazins that they would help each other, and the general ambassador and representative of these peoples, or rather 12 provinces, Sefer Bey Zanoko was chosen. On this occasion, James Bell writes in 1837:

"The Circassians are convinced that their main, if not the only, hope rests on themselves and on their own swords. Therefore, they are preparing to continue the war against Russia on their own. To this end, Sefir Bey, the most prominent of their princes, Judge Haji-Oku Mehmet and other influential and high-ranking persons went on a tour of the provinces. Everywhere they were met by a meeting of special representatives who, under oath, committed themselves on behalf of their communities to remain faithful to each other and reject all conditions of obedience, whatever they may be and what Russia may offer, unless they are authorized by their general approval. At the same time, they granted the prince and judge the title of ambassadors to try to get help for themselves from abroad, specifically instructing the first to stay abroad to finally achieve this goal. It was especially stipulated that no change could be made to the provision of the treaty without the consent or even the presence of Sefir Bey. It has been almost seven years since he has been absent and since nothing says that he is going to return under the current circumstances (which cannot be explained by a sense of fear, since everyone agrees to recognize him as the bravest of the brave), he reminds us of the legislator who forced his subjects to swear to obey his laws before his return and who then left his country forever. The league, of which Sefir Bay was appointed ambassador, consisted of the following twelve provinces: Natuhach, Shapsug, Abaza, Psadug, Temirgoy, Khatukoy, Makosh, Besni, Bashilbay, Teberdekh, Braki and Karachay.

The Karachay-Balkars continued to be active until 1833, as well as to support the Kuban Circassians, thanks to which the Amanates received by Emmanuel in 1828 were sent in early 1833 to the Dmitrievsky semi-battalion of military cantonists:

"The Karachay people live in the tops of the Kuban River, the population of it can be put up to 5,000 souls, which are divided into two classes: the elders and the free people. The Karachay people have repeatedly raided themselves or together with other highlanders on our borders. In 1828, the general from the cavalry Emanuel penetrated the lands and took the Amanats from them as a pledge of loyalty, but as they continued to pass predators through their lands and some of them personally participated in predation, their Amanates were sent in early 1833 to the Dmitrievsky semi-battalion of military cantonists. According to their situation, the Karachay people can contribute a lot to ensuring the tranquility of the neighborhoods of Mineralnye Vody and Kabarda, in order to have time to convince them to this, I allowed the staff captain Prince Shakhovsky to promise them that their former Amanates will be returned if they again express submission on favorable terms for us. What they promised to do:

1. To give one amanat from the elders and the free people.

2. To accept one of the Kabardian princes loyal to us as a bailiff, so that during the passage of predatory parties with the Zakuban princes, the Karachay people could raise their weapons to the princely families, because according to the ancient custom of some highlanders, the common people cannot fight with the princes without having an order from their equal family.

3. Stop any friendly relationship with the mountaineers who are hostile to us, to keep guards from the tops of the Caucasus Mountains to the Morzhisin River, which is near the stone bridge in the Kuban, and to keep predatory parties not exceeding thousands of people, if there are more of them, then let the Urusbians and the nearest military post know.

4. If predatory parties break through below the Marzhisina River, the nearest military authorities are obliged to notify the Karachay bailiff so that he can take appropriate measures to assist in case of persecution of predators by Russian troops. If the government considers it necessary to bring troops into the Karachay lands, they should assist them as much as possible.

During the ongoing negotiations between Prince Shakhovsky and the elders, this Karachay people proved their diligence and benefits that can be expected from their sincere devotion. A party of predators, crossing the Kuban, stole 6 rams and 60 cattle from Kabardia and captured three boys; the most honorable of the elders of the Karachays, the seventy-year-old Krimshamkhalov from 30 of his men rushed into the chase, caught up the predators and despite the fact that there were 140 people, stopped and held them until he received reinforcements from the people, then, having beaten off all the prey from them, returned the Kabardians according to belonging.

In the following years, the Karachays and the Balkars secretly kept in touch with the Kubans, so the English official Edmund Spencer says, who, during his voyage in the Western Caucasus in 1836, visited one of the representatives of the mountain tribes hostile to Russia, who lived in close proximity to Sukhum-Kale, Pitsunda and Bomborami. Spencer noted:

"...Due to the increased blockade, the Circassians began to purchase this product (meaning gunpowder) from Karachay, or as they are called by the Circassian Knights, Karshaga-Kushkha (Black Tatars), whose mountains abundantly give sulfur and sanitrate: their gunpowder is beautiful and strong, but because of the difficulty of its transportation through the snowy mountains, Circassian warriors prefer, except in cases of urgent need for immediate delivery, to buy it from the Turks in exchange for their own products"

Also, British agent James Bell, being with the Shapsugs, on the territory of present-day Sochi in 1837, writes:

"Every man (I could say every child) had a gun: the best, as I was told, are delivered from an area called Karachay, in the upper Kuban"

Note: only one Shapsugs exceeded the Karachay people at that time by almost 100 times, but they told two British agents where they get guns and gunpowder, so it was important.

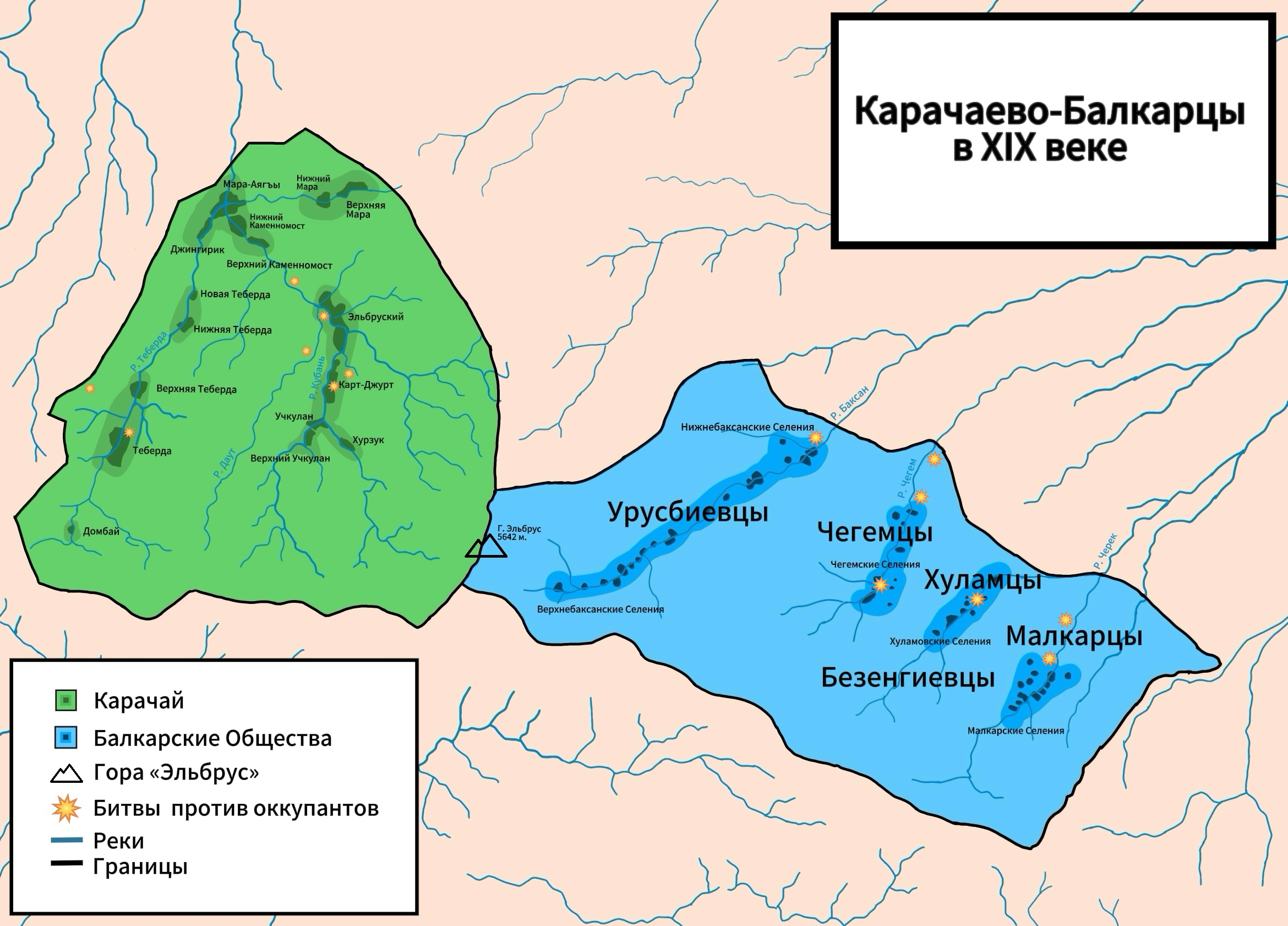
Karachay Balkars in XIX century

The position chosen by the Karachay people is very well described by Apollo Shpakovsky:

"The head of the right flank, Major General Evdokimov, in November 1851, undertook an enhanced reclamation to the upper reaches of the rivers: Big and Small Tegeney... Priteginsky auls ... were in friendly relations with the Karachays, a strong, predatory and militant tribe, only by the name "peaceful and submissive". Karachay, surrounded by an almost impregnable chain of mountains, was an extremely important strategic point for the highlanders, and the Tegin auls served him from the Kuban, Zelenchuks and Laba as advanced strong outposts against our sudden invasions. Through them, the Karachays always learned about the misfortune that threatened them in time and deftly knew how to remove the well-deserved punishment, protecting themselves with the guise of a "peaceful and submissive people" and blaming all their frauds on non-peaceful Pritegins.

In 1855, the Karachays mostly supported Imam of Circassia Muhammad Amin, and joined his army, although there were those who were against him: "At the beginning of 1851... the Temirgoys refused to recognize the power of the naiba... in the spring of 1851, the power of Muhammad-Amin was overthrown by the Black Sea Shapsugs... In the summer of the same year, Natuhai residents and residents of the Big Shapsug opposed the naib. In addition, in June 1851, a crowded people's assembly was held at the Shapsugs and Natuhais, at which the issue of trust in Muhammad-Amin was resolved... most of the gathered dissociated themselves from him. Soon the Naib was forced to leave the Shapsugs and Natukhais and move to the Abadzekhs on the Psekups River... representatives of the Bzhedukh nobility actively acted against the Naib. And in the summer of 1851, the Khamysheev and Chercheneev princes and nobles appealed to the commander of the Russian troops on the Caucasus line and in the Black Sea N. S. Zavodovsky with an expression of submission to the Russian government and expressed a desire to take an oath of allegiance to Russia. However, the peasants did not support the feudal lords... the harsh actions of the military command led to the opposite result. The local population increased its resistance to the royal troops. And the positions of Mohammed-Amin, on the contrary, began to consolidate... Meanwhile, in May 1852, Naib gathered large military forces in the Maikop and Kurgip gorges. The rebels were preparing to make a campaign to Karachay. However, Muhammad-Amin, having learned that the military command was well prepared to repel the military expedition of the highlanders, abandoned his intentions to move with a campaign to Karachay... Western Karachai to lead the rebels from there in the event of the outbreak of hostilities. To this end, Muhammad-Amin, gathering on the river. White a large number of horse and footmen, in mid-July 1853 moved to Karachay. Soon, having learned about this, the Russian troops passed to the rr. Marukha and Aksaut in the upper reaches of Maly Zelenchuk to "show the Karachai people their readiness to destroy the naib assassination assination"

Karachay princes Krymshamkhalovs against the rebels "put up 500 well-armed Karachay people with two companies of Kuban huntsmen to guard all important and convenient points for passage."

But when the naib settled down for the night in the upper reaches of Bolshoy Zelenchuk, his supporters from Karachay came to him and warned about the readiness of Russian troops and Karachay detachments to give a decisive rebuff to the rebels, after that "panic began in the camp, and Mohammed-Amin went back."

The naiba of Muhammad-Amin was invited to Karachay by Mufti Mohammed Khubiyev, who shared the ideas of the rebels... Thus, Muhammad-Amin's campaign in Karachay in 1853 did not take place... In the summer of 1855 Muhammad-Amin made an attempt to assert his power in Karachay. At the invitation of the Karachays, Naib entered their territory at the head of the Adyghe detachments... In August 1855, an active movement to join the Caucasian War began in Karachay, led by the spiritual leader of the Karachay people, Kadiy Magomet-Efendi Khubiev and Prince Idris Karabashev. Up to 3,000 Karachays joined this movement (in opinion of others, the figure is several times higher). On August 25, in the area of Hasauka, there was a battle between the united armed detachments of Karachays, Balkars, outer Kuban Adyghes, Nogais, Abazin and tsarist troops under the command of the General Kozlovsky. Russian troops won, Naib Muhammad-Amin went to outer Kuban, and an indemnit of 20 thousand rubles in silver was imposed on Karachay... However, despite the defeat, even after August 1855, the movement of Karachays did not stop. Prince M. S. testified to the formal nature of the Karachays withdrawal from the Caucasian War. Vorontsov, who in his letter of September 15, 1855, Gen. G. R. Eristov noted that "the Karachay people call to themselves to Mohammed Amin ... I write in this letter the names of those Karachay residents who, as they say, called for the enemy: Mohammed Crimea Shavkalov, Aslan Murza Dudov, Shamakha Dudov, Badra Crimea Shavkalov, Adil Karabashev and Kuba Efendi"

Theophilus Lapinsky, who lived and fought among the Circassians from 1857 to 1859, had weight and connections with the leaders of the resistance, also of the same opinion: "Now we will consider the attitude of residents to the Russian government. Upon closer acquaintance, we should divide the peoples of the Caucasus into four groups on this relationship.

First, the population paying tax and obeying Russian laws. It consists of settlers and colonists - linear and Black Sea Cossacks, Tatars, Turks, and Armenians. This part of the population, not counting the regular army, represents a number of approximately 1,200,000 souls of both sexes.

Secondly, the peoples who recognize the supreme power of the Tsar and supply the militia to serve Russia, but pay little or no taxes, obey their own laws, have not laid down their weapons and only tolerate Russian domination. These are Georgians and most of the Armenians, Tajiks (Persians), Kabardians, Kurds, some small tribes. Their total number is approximately 2,200,000.

Thirdly, peoples, either only nominally recognizing the sovereignty of the tsar, or only having concluded a kind of truce with the Russians, do not pay taxes and do not supply the police; their raids should be held back by force. These are the southern Abazas, Svanets, Ossetians, small tribes of Samurzakans, Besleneys, Karachays and Elbrus Tatars, Eastern Caucasians, and Imam Shamil's associates - Kumyks, Chechens, Avars, and Lezgins. Their number can be counted as 1,200,000 souls.

Fourthly, peoples in a state of war, against which the Russian Army is currently operating with all its might and about which the reader will find in this work as accurate a possible description. These are the northern Abazas (Adyge), which are incorrectly called Circassians in Europe and Turkey. Their number can be approximately 900,000 people."

After the Caucasian war and the Circassian Genocide about 10,000–15,756 Karachays and Balkars emigrated to the Ottoman Empire, with their migration reaching peaks in 1884–1887, 1893, and 1905–1906.

== Deportation ==
In 1944, the Soviet government forcibly deported almost the entire Balkar population to Kazakhstan, Kyrgyzstan, and Omsk Oblast in Siberia. Starting on 8 March 1944 and finishing the following day, the NKVD loaded 37,713 Balkars onto 14 train echelons bound for Central Asia and Siberia. The Stalin regime placed the exiled Balkars under special settlement restrictions identical to those that it had imposed upon the deported Russian-Germans, Kalmyks, Karachais, Chechens and Ingush. By October 1946, the Balkar population had been reduced to 32,817 due to deaths from malnutrition and disease. The Balkars remained confined by the special settlement restrictions until 28 April 1956. Only in 1957, however, could they return to their mountainous homeland in the Caucasus. During 1957 and 1958, 34,749 Balkars returned home.

== Language and literacy ==
In the Cyrillic alphabet as used by the Balkars, there are eight vowels and twenty-seven consonants. In the past the official written languages were Arabic for religious services and Turkish for business matters. From 1920 on Balkar has been the language of instruction in primary schools; subsequent instruction is carried out in Russian. Until 1928 Arabic letters were used to write the Balkar language; after 1937 Cyrillic was used. Ninety-six percent of the population is bilingual in Balkar and Russian. Organs of mass culture, secondary school texts, newspapers, and magazines in both Balkar and Russian continue to increase in number. In 2015, the number of bilingual people had increased by 1.3 percent resulting in 97.3 percent of the population speaking both Balkar and Russian. This is due to the globalization of urban areas and the impact of Russian education, in which children are more likely to be taught.

An example of a Balkar author is Kaisyn Kuliev who emphasized his love towards the Balkarya land and traditions.

== Notable Balkars ==
- Khadzhimurat Akkaev, weightlifter
- Asker Dzhappuyev, jihadist leader
- Muslim Atayev, jihadist leader
- Yahya-Hadji Zhangurazov, abrek
- Alim Kouliev, actor, theatre director
- Azamat Kuliev, artist
- Kaisyn Kuliev, poet
- Alikhan Shavayev, football player
- Ismail Musukaev, wrestler
- Albert Tumenov, professional mixed martial artist
- Bibert Tumenov, professional mixed martial artist
- Kharun Boziev, professional boxer
- Khyzyr Appayev, football player

== See also ==
- Balkar and Karachay nationalism
- Karachays
- Alans
- Bulgars
- Khazars
- Urusbiy
- Kipchaks
