= Balkar and Karachay nationalism =

National sentiment among the Balkars and Karachay

Balkar and Karachay nationalism is the national sentiment among the Balkars and Karachays. It generally manifests itself in:

- The movement for the recognition of the 1944 deportations (where the Balkars and Karachay, along with the Kalmyks, Chechens and Ingush were deported to Siberia and Central Asia) as a genocide against the nation.
- The movement to separate Kabardino-Balkaria into Kabardin and Balkar administrative units (Circassian nationalists also share this goal)
- Likewise, the movement to separate Karachay–Cherkessia into Karachay and Cherkess administrative units
- The movement to unify Karachai and Balkar units into a single republic
- The movement to unify the census categories of Karachai and Balkar into a single category
- Turkic nationalist flavor, and a strong affinity to the state of Turkey
- Mandate of Karachay-Balkar language as the official language
- Defense of Balkar grazing lands against Kabardin influence
- In some circles, Pan-Turkism

== Historical context ==
=== The 1944 Deportations and their effect on the modern movement ===
In 1943 and 1944, the Balkars and Karachais were deported en masse to Central Asia, as were the Chechens, Ingush and Kalmyks. All groups were accused of "collaboration with the Nazis".

After the deportation, as happened to the other victims, the Balkars and Karachais were stripped of all political recognition of their territories. The Kabardino-Balkar Autonomous Soviet Socialist Republic was renamed to the Kabardin ASSR, while the Karachay Autonomous Oblast was completely wiped of the map and partitioned into territories given to the Cherkess Autonomous Oblast, Stavropol Krai, Krasnodar krai and the Georgian SSR.

The account of the NKVD (the organization guilty of the deportation), the following statistics were given:

- In total, 724,297 people were sent to Central Asia (Siberia and Kazakhstan) in the airless freight trains (others, such as the Chechen aul of Khaibakh, were massacred en masse instead)
- Peoples deported were 39,407 Balkars, 71,869 Karachai, 412,548 Chechens, 96,327 Ingush, and 104,146 Kalmyks
- According to the NKVD, the average death rate of those deported was about 23.5% (144,704 people)

Many historians have questioned the authenticity of the NKVD report, stating that it was probably a far understatement, noting also that the figure produced by Khrushchev in 1956 contradicts Beria's figure by at least 96,000 people (and stating that even Khrushchev's could have been an understatement, considering his position).

Contrary to the Soviet view of the whole nations as treacherous Nazi-collaborators, according to the official statistics, 4428 of deported Chechens, 946 Ingush, 2543 Karachai, and 1045 Balkars were veterans of the Red Army.

Despite the appalling conditions, the Balkars and Karachais contributed greatly to the economic development of Soviet Central Asia. In 1946 there were more than 50 Karachai Stakhanovites and 70 Karachai shockworkers (distinctions for those who consistently overfilled their quotas) in Voroshilov District in Kyrgyzstan alone. As the Balkars and Karachais demonstrated their industriousness and patriotism, they moved into positions of greater authority, especially in Kyrgyzstan, where numerous Karachai physicists, doctors and educators could be found. So valued were the Karachais that before their departure home in 1957, authorities in both Kazakhstan and Kyrgyzstan offered to create an autonomous oblast for them if they agreed to stay.

In exile, the Karachais and Balkars were able to obtain education for their children at a level far beyond what would have been possible in their homeland. They also integrated into the religious life of the Central Asians and many received formal Islamic training and collected private libraries of Islamic books. After their return home, they maintained ties to the religious communities they left behind. The returnees were better educated that those who remained, better versed in Islam than they had been before, and were instilled with a deep sense of indignation for the unjust and inhumane acts committed against them by the Soviet government.

As is the case with the other victims of this deportation, as well as many of the Soviet deportations as a whole, the Balkars and Karachais view it as a national tragedy, a central part of the nation's victimhood, and demand it be recognized as a genocide.

== Since 1985 ==
=== Origins and rise ===
Balkar/Karachay nationalism in its current reincarnation first became visible during the glasnost era when the Soviet Union was ruled by the reform-minded Mikhail Gorbachev although the population may have had various nationalist sentiments widely manifested among themselves before, as many of their neighbors did. At first, nationalist organizations watered down their rhetoric in order to not provoke a crackdown.

The Balkars and Karachays were relatively late compared to their neighbors in seizing autonomy and establishing visible national demands and movements, partly due to their lesser numbers and even lesser intelligentsia class. The first congresses for Balkars and Karachays were formed as late as 1991.

In general, Caucasus independence movements in the glasnost era were much more assertive and aggressive, being more similar to their Baltic counterparts which they often exchanged tactics with. In 1986, an important stepping stone was the release and popularity of the Georgian film Repentance, which had undertones regarding the falsification of history by Moscow and the repression of nations. The film instantly became a hit across the mountains, and even more so after its politicization (leading to Shevardnadze actively protecting its director from Kremlin reprisal. The film had at least 30 million viewers after its first year of release, despite being described as a mediocre film. It was not long before Georgian nationalism in earnest began to make itself heard.

The second people in the Caucasus to develop a popular movement against Soviet power were the Chechens, who founded the Caucasus' first anti-Soviet group, Kavkaz, in the summer of 1988. Kavkaz was originally disguised as an environmentalist group, perhaps earnestly, though it was agreed early on by its members that an establishment of autonomy would be the only way to secure their demands, including environmental protection. Soon, in Tbilisi, the Round Table/Free Georgia bloc was founded,. Due to the Georgians' more powerful and confident position, it was inclined to much more inflammatory and openly nationalistic rhetoric of the historian and literary critic Zviad Gamsakhurdia. As the ethnic Armenian Caucasus expert Georgi Derluguian points out, All-Union conferences, intended for national unity, accomplished the opposite. Lithuanian, Latvian and Estonian intellectuals exchanged ideas with the Chechens and Georgians (and later other Caucasians), and at times even programmatic documents. This led to a radicalization of demands of all involved groups, as they became increasingly aware of the mass dislike toward the Russian center. It also led to the accelerating spread of nationalism to other groups.

In 1989, the hugely inadequate government response to the earthquakes in Armenia and Azerbaijan triggered a mass desertion of the Soviet system in general by the Eastern Caucasian regions (Armenia, Azerbaijan and Dagestan) that had been relatively loyal previously. The Azeri Popular Front, formed in 1989, was to become a pole to which the opposition gravitated. Its habitually theatrical activities paired with its occasional tendency to cite pan-Turkist ideology and the ethnic similarities between Azeris and the Karachays and Balkars drew the mass interest of the Balkar and Karachay public. Nonetheless, their activities remained timid. It wasn't until 1991, after Georgia and Armenia had already seceded from the Soviet Union, Dudayev had defected from the Red Army (while back in Checheno-Ingushetia the anti-Zavgayev forces were gathering power), and Azerbaijan was preparing to leave the union (only Dagestan had no plans for secession, because of its own multiethnic makeup and fragile situation), that the Balkars and Karachay began to stage their own demands.

However, as was the case with other such movements, the rhetoric was slowly stepped up, especially as, after the Russian Federation was formed, Balkars and Karachais were angered by the perception that the center in Moscow wanted to re-centralize their territory (including a possible abolition of their autonomy). This was confirmed with Vladimir Putin's actions in 2000, and his explicitly stated policy advocating "enlargement of regions of Russia". Sergei Mironov stated on March 30, 2002, that "89 federation subjects is too much, but larger regional units are easier to manage" and that the goal was to merge them into 7 federal districts. Gradually, over time, ethnic republics were to be abolished to accomplish this goal of integration.

=== Russian Federation era ===
The Balkars are often seen as being much more overtly active than the Karachay, due to their lack of representation in the republican government (the Karachay are the dominant group in most of Karachay–Cherkessia while Balkars are a minority in Kabardino-Balkaria). Karachay nationalists, as many Cherkess activists moan (see Circassian nationalism), recently have been increasingly present and arguably influential in the government of Karachay–Cherkessia (often at the expense of Cherkess members), so there is less need for open protesting and other such activities.

In 1992, however, when the Karachay launched a massive autonomist campaign, and Boris Yeltsin eventually "suggested" a split of the Karachey-Cherkess republic into two ethnic republics. However, at that time, the control of the republic was still in the hands of Russians and Cherkess, who, in a moment of unity (one of the last instances of good relations between the Russians and Circassians in the republic, who are often bitterly resentful of each other), quickly scrapped the bill, provoking the rage of the Karachay populace. However, at this point, the Karachay were more or less politically incapable of retaliating. This and the subsequent repression of Karachay aspirations is seen by some to be an important precursor to the fierce later repression of Cherkess irridentism by the Karachay-led government, which even resorted to historical-based attacks on Circassian nationalism (questioning the Circassian ethnicity of the man who first scaled Elbrus). Others, however, see it as "artificial tensions" created by puppet governments (be they run by ethnic Cherkess or by Karachay) of Moscow.

Many people, ranging from Circassian activist coordinators to Akhmed Zakayev, Ichkerian head of government-in-exile to the liberal journalist Fatima Tlisova have speculated that Russia has tried to use a policy of divide and rule throughout the North Caucasus (citing examples of the Circassian vs. Karachai/Balkar rivalry, Ossetian-Ingush conflict, Georgian-Abkhaz conflict, Georgian-Ossetian conflict, interethnic rivalries in Dagestan and even the Nagorno-Karabakh conflict, which Russia also insisted on mediating), creating "unnatural conflicts" that can only be solved by Kremlin intervention, keeping Caucasian peoples both weak and dependent on Russia to mediate their conflicts. Sufian Jemukhov and Alexei Bekshokov, leaders of the "Circassian Sports Initiative" stated that the conflict "has the potential to blow up the whole Caucasus into a bloody mess with the mass civilian casualties and therefore keep the Circassians from opposing the Sochi Winter Olympics...Moscow plays the conflict scenario when the participants do not have the ability to solve the conflict, but the conflict is absolutely manageable and can be easily solved by its rulers from the Kremlin."

In 1996, the Kabardin-Balkar republic's Kremlin-installed government responded to demands to split the republic in two with mass arrests and repression.

The Russian invasion of Ukraine that began in 2022 had affected Karachay and Balkar ethnic groups as they are among the higher casualty rates in the side of the Russian Armed Forces although there are a lesser number of Balkars and Karachays fought in the Ukrainian legion.

=== Genocide recognition campaign ===
The campaign for the recognition of the genocide is a central tenet and article of faith for Balkar and Karachay activists. It embodies the sense of persecution and loneliness felt by the Balkar and Karachay populace.

Karachai and Balkar nationalists often hold rallies on the "genocide anniversary". On March 8, 2010, one such rally in Nal'chik (Kabardino-Balkaria) attracted hundreds of protesters, demanding "self-determination" for the Balkar people, claiming the Kabardin and Russian dominated parliament did nothing to address their woes. The rally drew some protest from the Russian population (calling it "separatist" and "subversive") and from the local government.

In 2010, in a conciliatory move (an attempt to defuse the three-way tensions between Russians, Circassians and Balkars in Kabardino-Balkaria), President Kanokov of the Kabardino-Balkar Republic recognized the deportations as genocide, echoing statements made by the Chechen separatist government, Estonia and a memorial in Vilnius, Lithuania in solidarity with the Balkars and Karachai people as fellow deportation victims.

== See also ==
- Circassian nationalism
- Pan-Turkism
- Circassian people
- Kabardino-Balkaria
- Karachay–Cherkessia
