= Battle of Khasauka =

Part of the Caucasian War (1828)

- Part of the Caucasian War
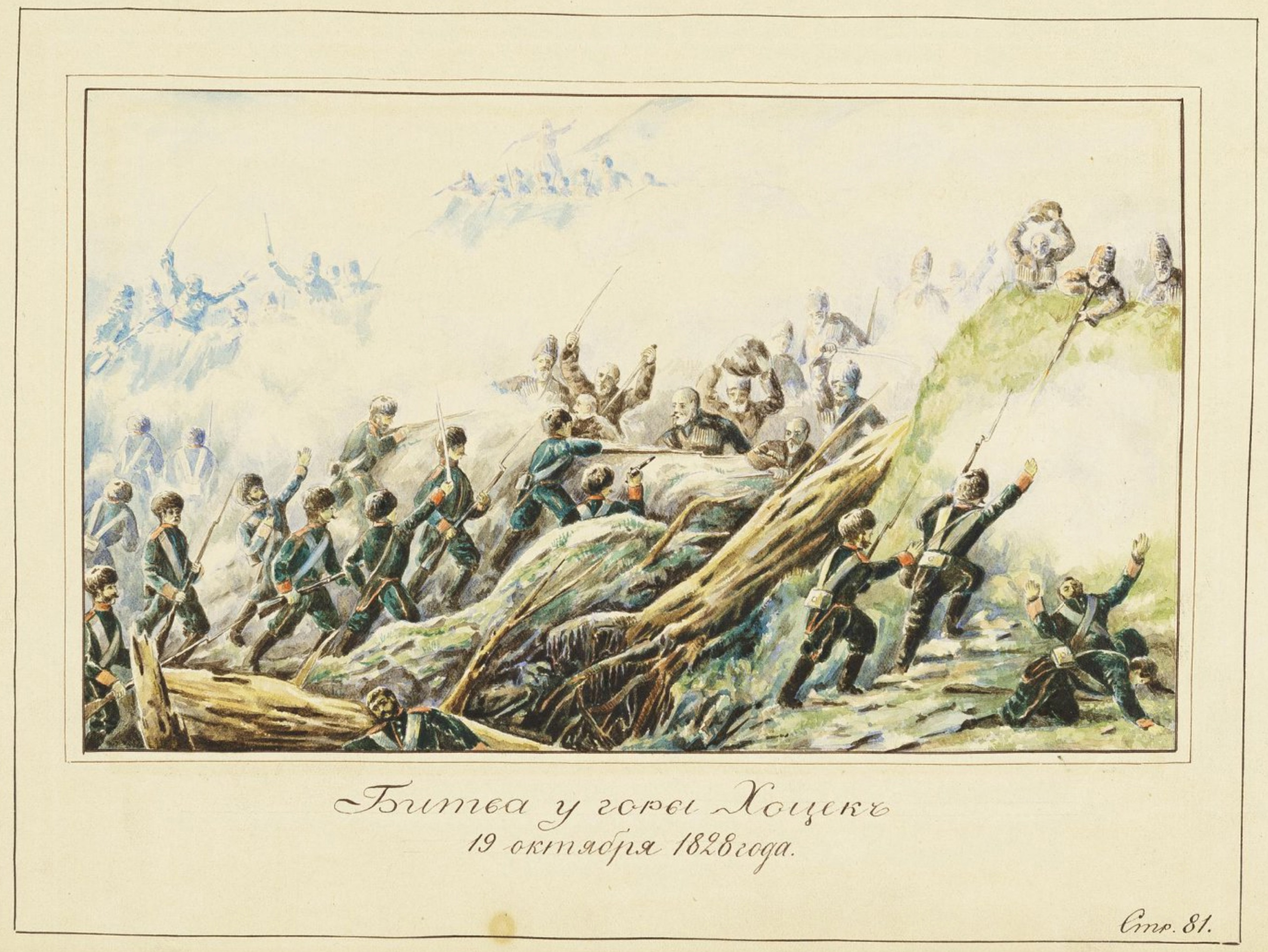
- Geevsky E.P. "Battle of Mount Chotzek 19 October 1828"
Date	17 – 29 October 1828
Location	Karachay
Result	Russian victory

Belligerents
Karachay troops Balkar volunteers (Circassia) Circassians (Note: Circassian detachments cooperated with Karachay forces prior to the campaign. Karachay villages and gorges also served as refuges for Circassian 'abreks' and other mountain fighters who were part of the combined resistance against the Russian advance.)	Russian Empire

Commanders and leaders
Oliy Islam Krymshamkhalov	General Georgi Emmanuel

Strength
About 500–700	About 3,000, 13 guns, 2 mortars

Casualties and losses
Unknown	On 20 October: ~44 killed and 120 wounded After the whole expedition: ~69 killed and 193 wounded or ~800 killed and wounded

The Battle of Khasauka (Battle of the Khasauka Pass, Battle of Mount Khasauka, Karachay-Balkar: Khasauka Urush) was a battle during the Caucasian War between the Russian imperial troops and the Karachay militia, which took place from 17 October (29 October) till 29 October (10 November), 1828 near the village of Kart-Dzhurt. It ended with the defeat of the mountaineers, but Karachay would remain independent until the formal annexation of Karachay to the Russian Empire in 1834.

== Background ==
Mountainous, high-altitude Karachay were located at the source of the Kuban River. Its geographical position allowed the Karachays to periodically intervene in the course of the Caucasian War. In 1826, an agreement was reached between representatives of Karachay and the tsarist administration on the neutrality of Karachay in the Caucasian War. However, it no longer suited the Russian administration, which was determined to completely annex the region through which the Western and Eastern Caucasus communicated. The Karachay also threatened the stability of the imperial presence in the region, as many of them felt a stronger allegiance to the Ottoman Empire, with whom they shared the Islamic faith with. in 1826, even before the arrival of General Emmanuel with a Russian army in the Caucasus, the Karachais had "sworn allegiance to the Ottoman Empire and gave amanates there in opposition to the peace treaty between Russia and the Porte...".

Aware of the importance of the Karachais' dependence on the Ottoman Empire, Anapa Pasha made every effort to ensure that the Karachais were "subjects of the Turkish Empire", and one of these propaganda made a strong impression on the Karachais, and they "showed especially lively activity in raids on our line in during the war with Persia ...".

After the conquest of Kabardia and the annexation of Balkaria to the Russian Empire, a number of gorges in Balkaria and Karachay remained refuges for Kabardian, Karachay, Balkar and other mountain detachments that continued resistance to the Russian administration.

In 1826, Mohammed (Amantish) Dudov fled from Karachay, who subsequently, on the eve of Emmanuel's campaign in Karachay, was in Nalchik. Due to disagreements with Oliy Islam Krymshamkhalov, Dudov agreed to cooperate with the Russians and gave important information about the approaches to Karachay and acted as a guide for Russian troops.

On 11 January (23), 1827, the Balkar-Digor delegation arrived in Stavropol and in January took the oath before the commander of the Russian troops in the North Caucasus, General Georgiy Emmanuel, as a result of which the Balkars and Digors were accepted into Russian citizenship. From that time on, the Karachays living in inaccessible gorges began to pose the greatest danger to some Russian possessions in the Caucasus.

The warlike population of Karachay, relying on their natural strongholds, could always represent a formidable force for us, but the lack of convenient places for arable farming and the lack of convenient pastures forced them to enter into trade relations with the Cossacks settled on the Caucasian line. With its geographical location, Karachay separated the Trans-Kuban mountain peoples from the Kabardians and other tribes who lived in the center of the Caucasian line, not allowing them to help each other and act against us with their combined forces... In the journal of military operations for the month of June 1827, there is evidence that the Karachais, having formed a "party" of 300 people, stole Cossack cattle from the Baksan River and other places. In the same magazine for the month of November, a case of correspondence between the Russian authorities and the Anapa Pasha was noted. Informing him that the Karachais, as living on the right side of the Kuban, are considered, according to the treaty between Russia and Turkey, to be "Russian subjects," the Russian authorities asked the Turkish Pasha to keep the "fugitive Kabardians" who lived in Karachay from inciting the Karachais against the Russians and their raids on Russian possessions.

Taking advantage of the inaccessible terrain, the Karachais not only carried out "daring raids" themselves, but in June 1828 they "took part in the destruction of villages. Gentle ", and in their villages for a long time there were parties of abreks and other Circassians who fought against Russia. At the same time of the Circassian raid on the village of Nezlobnaya, another "detachment of predators", consisting of Kabardians and Karachais, numbering about three thousand, was noticed in the zone between Urup and B. Zelenchuk, and was advancing towards Batalpashinsk. From the morning of 8 June 1828 until dusk, there was a skirmish between this detachment and Russian troops.

In the "most loyal report" of Count Ivan Paskevich dated 16 November 1828, the following was subsequently noted about the reasons for the campaign against the Karachays

General Emanuel reports that in order to ensure calm on the line, he considered it necessary to undertake an expedition against the Karachais: „a people living on the snowy heights of the Caucasus, in the peaks of the Kuban, who, in the hope of the inaccessibility of their lands, fearlessly gave shelter and assistance to all Trans-Kuban predators who passed through their lands for carrying out raids in the space between Kuban and Terek. Therefore, in the fall of 1828, under the leadership of General Emmanuel, a military campaign was undertaken against the Karachay people. The Russian detachment, among other officers, included the commander of the Mountain Cossack Regiment, Major P. S. Verzilin.

== Order of battle ==
The combined strength of the Russian Empire's detachments was about 3000 combat units with 13 guns and 2 mortars. These were divided between four leaders:

- Colonel Lukovkin, with 250 Cossacks of the Khopersky regiment, 120 Don Cossacks, 433 infantry, 2 battery guns, 2 horse guns, total forces of the column: 803 combat units with 4 guns.
- Major General Turchaninov, with 550 infantry, 300 Cossacks of different regiments, 4 guns and 2 mortars, the total forces of the column: 850 combat units with 4 guns and 2 mortars.
- Major Romashev, with 100 Cossacks of the Khopersky regiment, 2 infantry companies, 2 guns, the total forces of the column: about 610 combat units with 2 guns.
- Major General Andropov, with 2 companies of rangers, 250 Cossacks, 3 guns total forces of the column: about 730 combat units with 3 guns

The army of Karachay was significantly smaller. According to the military historian V.A. Potto, the forces of the Karachays concentrated in Khasauka were "only 500 people"; also, by the end of the battle, "a new party of two hundred people" arrived; most likely, these were those who defended at the Stone Bridge (KCR). The army also included a number of volunteers from the Balkar communities.

== Battle ==
The military campaign began on 17 October (29), 1828. Two columns were drawn up for the campaign: the first, under the command of Colonel Lukovkin, assembled near the village of Borgustan, consisted of 250 Cossacks of the Khopyor Regiment, 120 Don Cossacks, 443 infantry, 2 battery and 2 horse guns. The second concentrated near the river. Malki, at the "Stone Bridge", under the command of Major General Turchaninov, including 550 infantry, 300 Cossacks from line and Don various regiments, 4 guns and 2 hand mortars.

General Emmanuel himself was with the first column. In addition, Major General Antropov was ordered with a small detachment allocated from the Kuban reserves to go to another "Stone Bridge", in Kuban, and cover the columns; another detachment of hundreds of Khopers, 2 companies of infantry, and 2 guns, located in the Ukrainian. Ust-Dzhegutinsky, under the command of Major Romashev, was ordered to join Lukovkin's column and take part in the campaign against the Karachais.

The route was chosen thanks to Emmanuel's guides, Magomet Dudov, and the Abaza prisoner, assimilated by the Kabardians, Hatokhshoqo Abuqva, the latter was often, but erroneously, identified with the Kabardian prince Hatokhshoqo Hatokhshoqo who died way earlier than this battle, in 1809

On 20 October (1 November), 1828, Russian troops began the approach to the pass near Mount Khasauka near the village of Kart-Dzhurt, where at the foot of the mountain they were met by troops of the Karachay people's militia. In the vanguard of the Russians, under the command of Major Verzilin, followed a hundred Khoper Cossacks, 80 people of the Volga Cossacks, a company of Navagintsev and 100 riflemen of the Tenginsky regiment, one horse gun and two kegorn mortars, the rest of the infantry moved behind the vanguard, with the Cossacks in the tail; the rearguard consisted of 30 infantry and 30 Cossacks. When climbing Mount Khotsekoy, the Karachays met the vanguard with strong fire, trying to delay its movement. After an hour and a half bayonet battle, the mountain was captured.

At noon, the troops descended to the Khudes River, crossed the river, and, with difficulty installing one gun and both mortars, fired at the forest ahead, from where the Karachays greatly harassed the enemy. Next, we had to overcome the last obstacle - the pass to Karachay, a mountain called "Donkey Saddle". Behind a strong stone blockade blocking the path to the mountain, a detachment of 50 Karachays poured a hail of bullets on the advancing vanguard, but after shots from a gun, the Karachays were forced to leave the forward blockage.

Having strengthened the vanguard, General Emmanuel moved all the troops to the pass; 100 Cossack horse breeders were walking in the rear. Taking advantage of the position, the Karachays met the troops with "deadly fire and a mass of stones"; this stubborn battle lasted for 6 hours, where they had to overcome seven mountain ranges over 2–3 miles in order to capture the last height. Finally, the Karachays were forced to leave the last pass and retreat through forests and rocks to the opposite side of the gorge towards the Kuban.

At seven in the morning a battle began, which lasted for 12 hours and ended at seven in the evening. The number of troops of General Emmanuel in the Khasauki Pass - 1653 soldiers and officers, with 8 guns and 2 kegorn mortars, in addition, another detachment, under the command of Major Romashev, with about 610 soldiers and officers with 2 guns - arrived at the Khasauki Pass towards the end of the battle, at the same time, another detachment of Major General Andropov was operating at the Kamenny Bridge in the Kuban, about 730 soldiers and officers with 3 guns. The detachment of which Potto mistakenly confuses with the detachment of Major General Turchaninov due to the similar names of the strongholds in the Kuban and Malka - "Stone Bridge". The number of Karachays led by Islam Krymshamkhalov is not known exactly; the estimated number is about 500-700 people.

U. Aliyev states that: "The Karachays, shrouded in the darkness of the coming night, retreated through such terrain where the troops could easily lose the fruits of a dearly won victory if the mountaineers, having come to their senses, made a night attack (tradition says that in This is the fault of the mountain princes, who vilely provoked the fighting Karachays with the alleged decision of the ruler of Karachay, the prince of "Islam", to lay down arms...)".

As a result of the battle, the mountain formations were pushed back beyond the pass. The next day, Russian troops moved deep into the territory of Karachay to the village of Kart-Dzhurt . On 21 October ( 2 November ) Karachay parliamentarians came to the general, on the 22nd Oliy Krymshamkhalov visited Emmanuel’s camp, "with all the elders and submitted a petition attached in the name of the entire people," and on the 23rd "the entire Karachay people swore an oath of allegiance to citizenship Sovereign Emperor" with a presentation from both Islam Krymshamkhalov and three more "first families" of amanats, that is, honorary hostages, according to Karachay legends.

== Casualties ==
According to military historian A.L. Ghisetti, losses during the entire expedition amounted to 69 killed and 193 wounded from 17 October (29) till 29 October (10 November). Emmanuel's biographer N.B. Golitsyn indicates the loss of 44 killed and 120 wounded directly in the battle on 20 October (1 November). The hundred riflemen of the Tenginsky regiment, which were in the vanguard, lost 6 and wounded 26. According to Caucasus newspaper, 1869 the casualty losses go up to 800 killed and wounded. According to Ghisetti's estimates, the battle of Khasauka accounted for about a quarter of all losses of Russian forces in the Caucasus in 1828. The losses of the highlanders were not counted.

== Aftermath ==
On 23 October (4 November), the Karachay deputation led by Oliy Islam Krymshamkhalov signed with the troops of General Emmanuel, who approached the village of Kart-Jurt, "A petition from the Karachays to the commander of the Caucasian line G. A. Emanuel to accept them into Russian citizenship and provide patronage." - a document according to which Karachay was part of the Russian Empire.

Some authors note that the Karachays impeccably complied with the terms of the treaty and did not violate its provisions throughout the subsequent period of the Caucasian War.

General Emmanuel wrote to St. Petersburg about the results of the battle:

Thermopylae of the North Caucasus was taken by our troops, and the stronghold of Karachay, at the foot of Elbrus, for all mountain peoples hostile to Russia, with the help of God and the bravery of the troops, under my personal leadership, was destroyed... In the St. Petersburg newspaper " Northern Bee " on 22 November (4 December), 1828, it was written about this battle.

Brilliant success paves the way for the calm of the entire Caucasian region... The example of the conquest of this people, considered the most invincible among all mountain residents, will give others the opportunity to think about the possibility of repeating the same incident with them. The final annexation of Karachay occurred in 1834, which was reported on 24 September in his report from Tiflis, the commander of the separate Caucasian Corps G.V. Rosen to the Minister of War A.I. Chernyshev, about the negotiations of Prince I.V. Shakhovsky with the Karachais, "on the resumption oath of allegiance to Russia".

"Due to their position, the Karachais can contribute very much to ensuring the peace of the surroundings of Mineral Waters and Kabardia, in order to convince them of this, I allowed the staff captain, Prince Shakhovsky, to promise them that their former amanates will be returned if they again submit to the conditions that are beneficial to us conditions...During the ongoing negotiations between Prince Shakhovsky and the elders, this Karachay people proved by experience their zeal and the benefits that can be expected from their sincere devotion. A party of predators, having crossed the Kuban, stole 6 rams and 60 cattle from Kabardia and carried away three boys into captivity; the most honorable of the elders of the Karachays, the seventy-year-old old man Krymshamkhalov with 30 of his people rushed in pursuit, caught up with the predators and, despite the fact that there were 140 of them, stopped and held until he received reinforcements from the people, then, having recaptured all the prey from them, returned to the Kabardians according to their ownership."

== Folklore ==
The Battle of Khasauka has been memorialized in Karachay and Balkar folklore, with songs and oral traditions preserving the memory of the Karachay warriors who fought in the battle. Songs such as "Khasauqa" and "Song of Umar" celebrate the bravery and sacrifice of those who resisted Russian conquest. These cultural expressions have helped maintain a sense of identity and resistance among the Karachay people, even as they became part of the Russian Empire.
