= Urusbiy =

Surname of the mountain princes of the Balkaria in the North Caucasus

Urusbiy (Karachay-Balkar: Урусбийлери, Орусбийляры, Urusbiylari) is the surname of the mountain princes (Taubiy) of Balkaria in the North Caucasus.

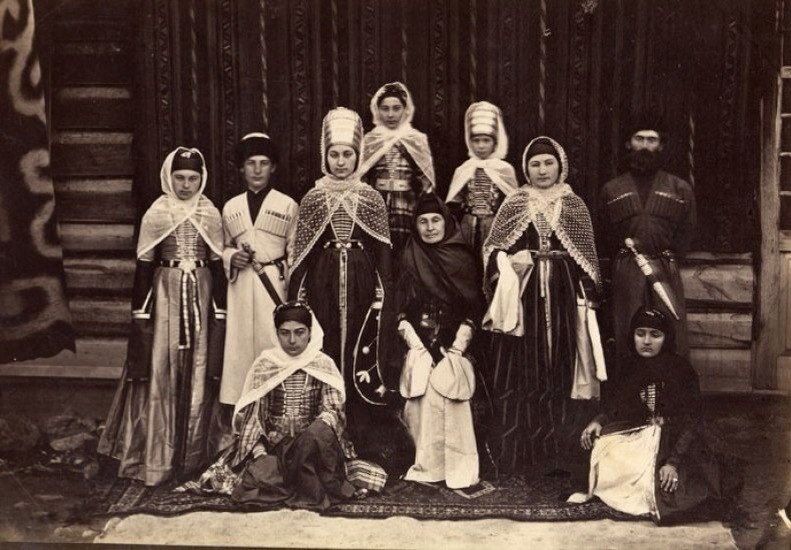
The Urusbiy family

== History ==
The Urusbiy surname originated from a representative of the Sunshev family (Karachay-Balkar: Suynschleri), who were part of the Bezengi Taubies (mountain princes).

At the end of the 18th century, Chepelleu, the grandson of Urusbiy Sunshev, moved with his mother to the Chegem society, where she was originally from. After growing up and exploring the neighboring Baksan Gorge, he decided to settle there permanently. He relocated his noblemen (uzdens), foster-brothers (emcheks), and serfs along with their families to the Baksan Gorge. They settled near the entrance of the gorge, close to the border of the lands owned by the Kabardinian princes, the Atazhukins, at a site called 'Kamyk'.

Shortly after the resettlement, Chepelleu received support from his mother's relatives, the Chegem princes (Taubiy). Over time, the Urusbiy surname was established by Chepelleu and his descendants, taking its name from Chepelleu's father, Urusbiy Sunshev.

== Representatives ==
- Ismail Urusbiy, (1831–1888), a son of Murzakul - Lieutenant of Russian Imperial Army.
