= Le Cabinet des Antiques =

1838 French novel

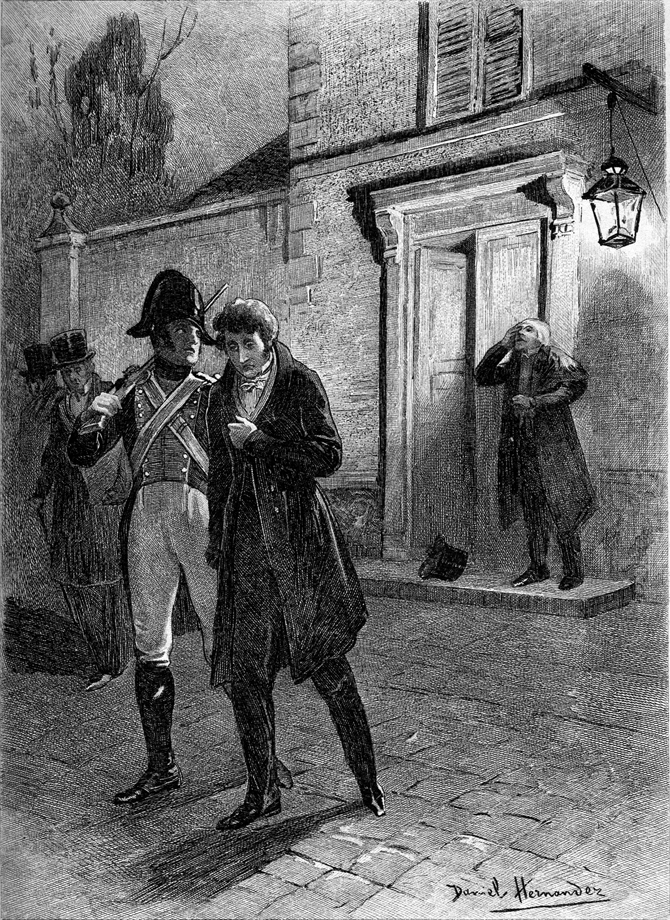
- Illustration from an 1897 edition by Daniel Hernández
- Author: Honoré de Balzac
- Language: French
- Series: La Comédie humaine
- Publisher: Hyppolite Souverain
- Publication date: 1839
- Publication place: France
- Preceded by: La Vieille Fille
- Followed by: Illusions perdues

Le Cabinet des Antiques (French pronunciation: [lə kabinɛ dez‿ɑ̃tik], The Cabinet of Antiquities) is a French novel published by Honoré de Balzac in 1838 under the title les Rivalités en province (Rivalries in the provinces) in le Constitutionnel, then published as a work in its own right in 1838 by the Souverain publishing house.

With la Vieille Fille, the work fits into les Rivalités, an isolated group in the Scènes de la vie de province collection of la Comédie humaine. In it, Balzac portrays the old nobility in the French provinces, ruined by the French Revolution and forgotten by the restored Bourbons. The marquis d’Esgrignon, his sister and his friends represent this social group, which the author had already portrayed in la Vieille Fille. The younger generation within this class, represented by the marquis's son, causes his loss, sucked in by the whirlpool of Paris, where he lives merrily and ruins his fortunes.

Le Cabinet des Antiques works as a sequel to la Vieille Fille although the names of its main characters are not exactly the same. It is an adventure story, full of twists and with suspense created by the young son that borders on that of a crime novel as he lies and risks imprisonment.

== Plot ==
The plot is partially narrated by journalist and author, Emile Blondet. The narrator talks about events he has witnessed, mainly his admiration for Armande d'Esgrignon and a small provincial town where his father, the respectable judge Blondet, still lives.

As a child, Blondet frequently watches Armande while she takes a stroll with her nephew, Victurien d'Esgrigon. The angel-faced child is carefully taken care of, as he does not have a mother. He was raised by his doting aunt and his adoring father. As a young man, Victurien is strikingly intelligent but has a habit of lying, he prompts his impoverished family to give him more than they can afford to. Chesnel, the old notary, always manages to clear their debts, eventually ruining himself for Victurien. He even gives the young man his savings when the latter is sent to Paris.

However, becoming a part of the Marquis of Esgrigon's circle is a privilege, as only noble families are admitted. This makes some upstarts, such as Du Croisier, vengeful. The latter notices Victurien's penchants and manages to fault him. Victurien ends up being arrested for owing Du Croisier colossal sums of money. Chesnel manages to get the young man out of trouble with one of his clever ploys.

Victurien eventually marries Du Croisier's niece, wallowing in her vast wealth and regularly making her unhappy.
