= Battle of the Cherek River =

- Part of Russo-Circassian War
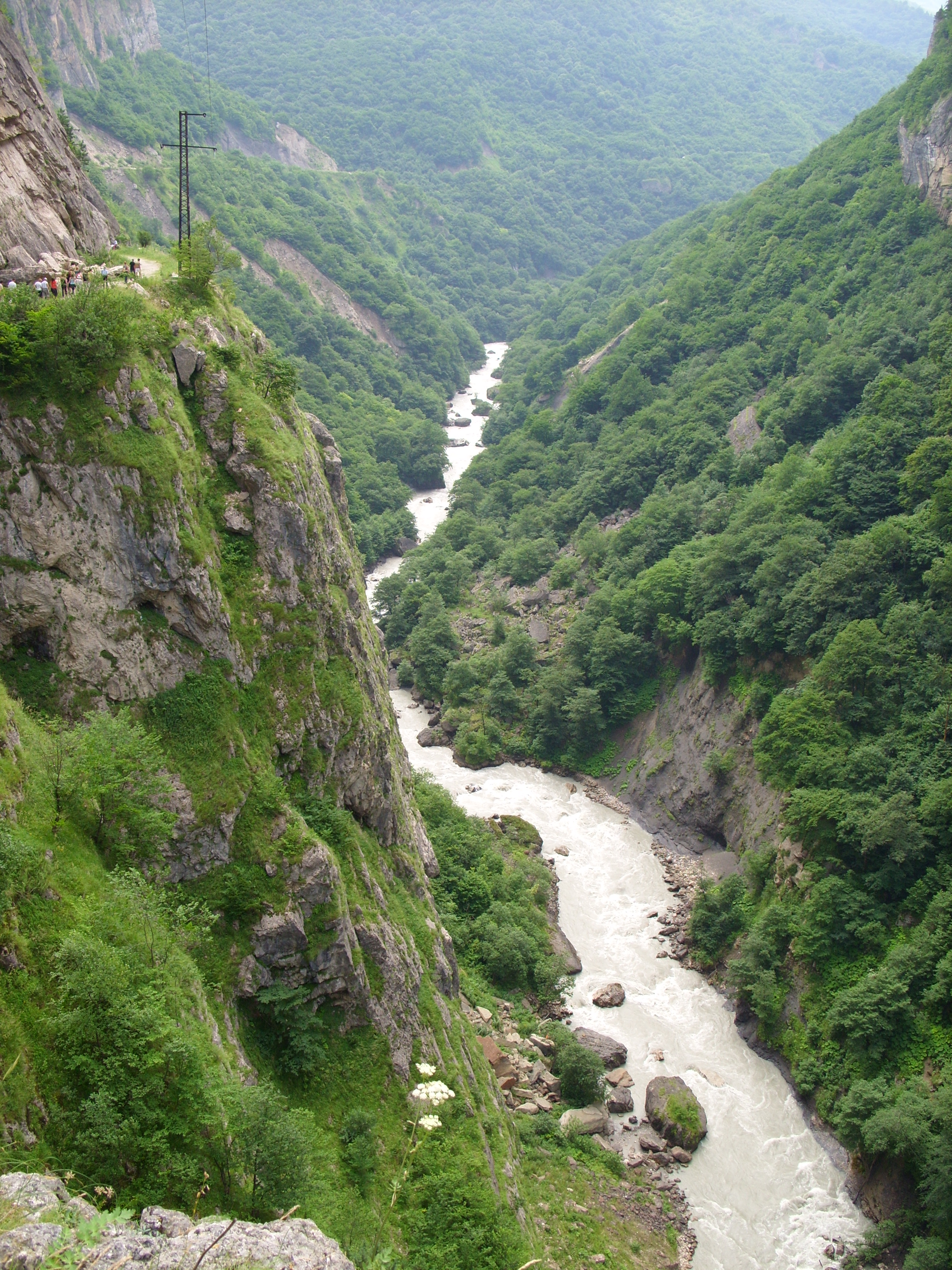
- The Cherek River
Date	April 30, 1810
Location	Near the Cherek River, Kabarda, North Caucasus
Result	Russian victory

Belligerents
Russian Empire	Kabardians; Balkars

Commanders and leaders
General S. A. Bulgakov	Unknown

Strength
Several thousand regular troops	~2,000 horsemen and infantry and Balkar auxiliaries

Casualties and losses
Unknown	Heavy
- Russian troops destroyed nearly 200 Circassian and Balkar villages, massacred much of the population, and seized over 20,000 cattle.

The Battle of the Cherek River was a significant engagement during the Russo-Circassian War, taking place on April 30, 1810, near the Cherek River in Kabarda and Balkaria, regions in the North Caucasus. The battle pitted Russian imperial forces under General S. A. Bulgakov against a coalition of Kabardian and Balkar fighters resisting Russian encroachment on their lands.

== Background ==
In the early 19th century, the Russian Empire intensified efforts to assert control over the North Caucasus, including Kabarda. As resistance escalated in 1809–1810, Russian forces were deployed to prevent the Kabardinian population from retreating into the mountains. Opposing nobles were arrested or sentenced, and under heavy pressure, many Kabardinian princes capitulated, swearing allegiance to the Tsar and paying tribute in the form of 1,000 horses, 500 cattle, and 10,000 rubles.

Despite this submission, many Kabardians remained defiant. In 1810, a large-scale punitive expedition was launched by General Bulgakov to subdue the region. Russian troops burned approximately 200 Circassian and Balkar villages, massacred a significant portion of the population, and seized over 20,000 cattle.

== The Battle ==
On April 30, 1810, Bulgakov reported that more than 2,000 Kabardian horsemen, reinforced by infantry and supported by Balkar allies, had fortified themselves in two mountain gorges near the Cherek River. These positions were strategically chosen for their defensibility at the foot of the snowy mountains. Russian troops successfully blockaded the gorges, leading to a confrontation that resulted in heavy losses for the defenders.

== Aftermath ==
The Russian victory at the Cherek River helped solidify imperial control over Kabarda, though it further devastated the region. From 1763 to 1817, the population of Kabarda declined dramatically from estimated about 350,000 to 37,000 due to war, disease, and forced relocation.

The Balkar population also suffered catastrophic losses. Between 1795 and 1834, their numbers fell from an estimated 10,200 to 4,000, resulting in a population loss of over 60%.

In 1811, a Kabardinian delegation traveled to St. Petersburg to negotiate for the preservation of their political and economic rights. The mission sought relief from harsh colonial policies, including issues related to land, serfdom, trade, and local governance.

Despite these defeats, resistance to Russian rule in the Caucasus continued in other regions. The battle marked a turning point in the suppression of Kabardian and Balkar resistance but did not end the broader struggle against imperial expansion.

== Significance ==
The Battle of the Cherek River is emblematic of the fierce resistance mounted by North Caucasian peoples against Russian imperial expansion. The brutality of the campaign foreshadowed the broader policies that would culminate in the Circassian genocide later in the 19th century.

== See also ==
- Russo-Circassian War
- Kabardia
- Balkars
- Circassian genocide
