= Osman Kasaev =

Soviet partisan (1916–1944)

Osman Musayevich Kasayev
- Осман Мусаевич Касаев
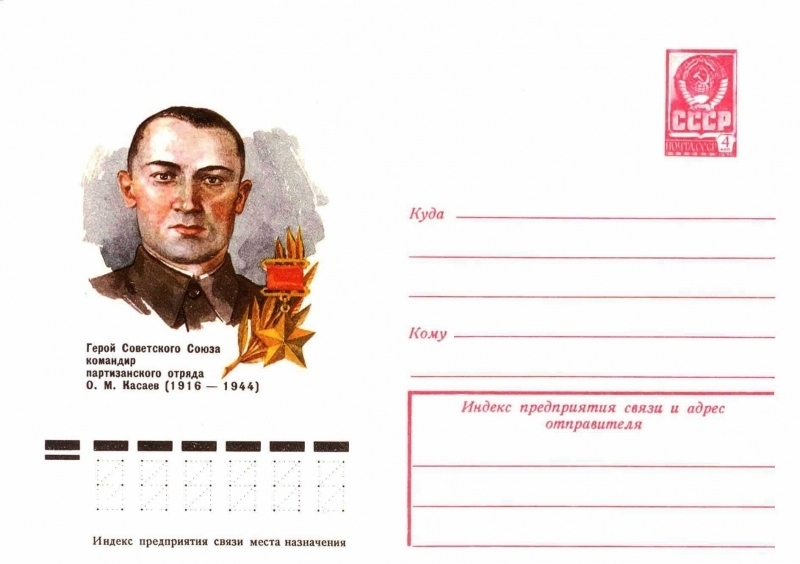
- Poster card featuring Osman Kasayev
- Born: 11 October 1916; Khurzuk aul, Karachayevsky District, Russian Empire
- Died: 18 February 1944 (aged 27); Byerazino District, Byelorussian SSR
- Military career
- Allegiance: Soviet Union
- Branch: Red Army
- Service years: 1937–1944
- Rank: Major
- Conflicts: World War II; Invasion of Poland; Eastern Front †
- Awards: Hero of the Soviet Union

Osman Musayevich Kasayev (Russian: Осман Мусаевич Касаев; 11 October 1916 – 18 February 1944) was a Karachay Major in the Soviet Army during World War II who commanded a partisan detachment after his artillery division was defeated by the Germans during Operation Barbarossa. His detachment eventually became the 121st Partisan Regiment, and under his command the unit was credited with resulting the deaths of over 1,000 German soldiers before he died of injuries from an airstrike in 1944. In 1965, on the 20th anniversary of the end of the war, he was posthumously awarded the title Hero of the Soviet Union.

== Biography ==
Osman Kasayev was born on 11 October 1916 in Khurzuk aul (now Karachaevsky District of Karachay-Cherkess Republic). By nationality - Karachay. In 1931 he ended primary school, in 1936 - rafbak. In 1937 Kasayev was drafted into the Red Army. Was studying in cavalry military academy, but has been reassigned to Kyiv Artillery school. Participated in Soviet invasion of Poland. Since the outbreak of Great Patriotic War fought on the front.

Shortly after the war began 121st Rifle Division, in which Kasayev fought was encircled and defeated. In the late August 1941, upon reaching Byalynichy district of Mogilev region, Byelorussian SSR, a group of fighters and commanders, including Kasayev, decided to start combat operations as partisans. Initially Kasayev was elected as political commissar, and later as a leader of partisans detachment, which was assigned the number 121. Detachment was successfully fighting in Mogilev region, destroying garrisons, punitive units, warehouses, motor depots, and headquarters. At the end of 1943 detachment had over 1200 partisans, then it was transformed into 121st Partisan Regiment, commander of which Kasayev became. At the end of February 1944 regiment had fought in over 70 battles, defeated over 1000 enemy soldiers and officers, blew up 33 German echelons. On 17 February 1944, during the transition between settlements in Byerazino district (Minsk region, BSSR) the partisan column was attacked by the German air force.
