= Edmond Werdet =

French author and book publisher

- Born: 6 November 1793; Bordeaux
- Died: 27 February 1870 (aged 76); Champs-sur-Marne
- Occupations: Journalist; Publisher

Edmond Werdet (6 November 1793 - 1870) was a French author and book publisher.

== Life ==
He was married in June 1845 and had one son whose name was Oscar. He went bankrupt in 1837 and again in 1845, dying in poverty.

== Author ==
The following books authored by him are currently extant:

- Portrait intime de Balzac (Paris: E. Dentu, 1859)
- De la librairie française : Son passé--son présent--son avenir, avec des notices biographiques sur les libraires-éditeurs les plus distingués depuis 1789 (Paris: E. Dentu, 1860)
- Souvenirs de la vie littéraire (E. Dentu, 1879)
- Histoire du livre en France depuis les temps les plus reculés jusqu'en 1789 (Paris: E. Dentu, 1861; 4 volumes)

== Publisher ==
He was the publisher of the following books:

- La Vieille Fille
- Le Lys dans la vallée
- Splendeurs et misères des courtisanes
