= Le Lys dans la vallée =

1835 novel by Honoré de Balzac

Le Lys dans la Vallée
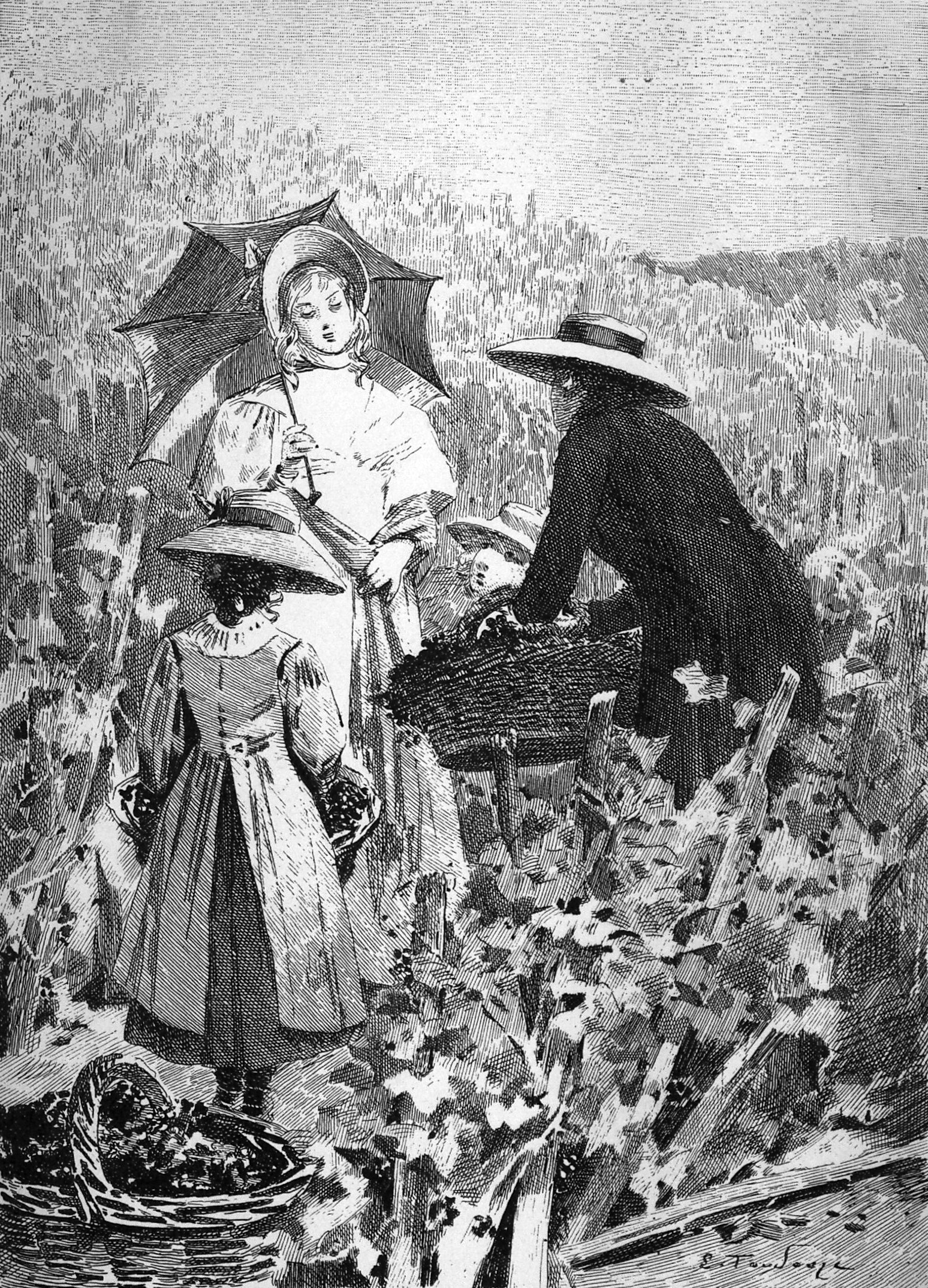
- Image from Le Lys dans la Vallée
- Author: Honoré de Balzac
- Illustrator: Édouard Toudouze
- Language: French
- Series: La Comédie humaine
- Publisher: Edmond Werdet
- Publication date: 1835
- Publication place: France
- Preceded by: Le Curé de village
- Followed by: La Peau de chagrin

Le Lys dans la Vallée (English: The Lily in the Valley or The Lily of the Valley) is an 1835 novel about love and society by the French novelist and playwright Honoré de Balzac (1799–1850). (The title, in French, does not refer to the English flower called "lily of the valley", which is called "muguet" in French). It primarily concerns the emotionally vibrant but never physically consummated affection between Félix de Vandenesse and Henriette de Mortsauf. It is part of his series of novels (or Roman-fleuve) known as La Comédie humaine (The Human Comedy), which parodies and depicts French society in the period of the Bourbon Restoration and the July Monarchy (1815–1848). In his novel he also mentions the château Azay-le-Rideau, in the Loire Valley, which can still be visited today.

== Inspiration ==
Henriette de Mortsauf was modelled on Balzac's close friend Laure Antoinette de Berny (née Hinner), a woman 22 years his senior who greatly encouraged his early career. Mme. de Berny died shortly after reading the completed novel — in which Henriette also dies.

Lady Dudley was inspired by Frances Sarah Lovell, Countess Guidoboni-Visconti.

== English translations ==
- Katharine Prescott Wormeley: The Lily of the Valley (Roberts Bros., 1891)
- Ellen Marriage (under pseudonym "James Waring": The Lily of the Valley (J. M. Dent, 1897)
- Peter Bush: The Lily in the Valley (New York Review Books, 2024)
