= American Karachay-Kavkaz Benevolent Association =

- Америка Къарачай-Кавказ Сууаблыкъ Ассоциация (Karachay-Balkar)
- Abbreviation: AKBA
- Formation: November 27, 1989
- Founder: Fehmi Berk; Fahrettin Djangoz; Kemal Jatto; Yusuf Diril; Birol Kalebek; Ahmet Karachay; Cihat Kulaksyz; Erol Tambi; Jashar Thambi
- Type: non-profit NGO
- Headquarters: Paterson, New Jersey
- Coordinates: 40°53′23.83″N 74°9′12.61″W
- Website: http://akba.org/

American Karachay-Kavkaz Benevolent Association (Karachay-Balkar: Америка Къарачай-Кавказ Сууаблыкъ Ассоциация; abbreviated AKBA) is a significant cultural and educational organizations of the Karachay-Balkar diaspora in the United States. It is a non-profit organization located in Paterson, New Jersey.

The mission of the association is to preserve the cultural, ethnic, and religious interests of the local Karachay-Balkar diaspora in the United States.

== History ==
The American Karachay-Kavkaz Benevolent Association was founded on November 27, 1989, with the aim of preserving the ethnic, religious, and national identity of the Karachay and Balkar diaspora in the United States. The association was established by individuals who were survivors of the deportations of the Karachay and Balkar peoples between 1943 and 1944.

Following the deportations, many members of these communities emigrated to the United States, including families who arrived in New York City in the late 1950s with assistance from the Tolstoy Foundation, before settling in various cities across the country.

Since its establishment, the association has organized commemorative events dedicated to significant dates in the history of the Karachay and Balkar peoples, including annual remembrance activities.

In 1995, representatives of the Karachay-Balkar diaspora purchased a two-story building on Crooks Avenue. The facility includes a community center, cafeteria, banquet hall, and a cultural space for Karachay-Balkar ethnic dance and traditions.

In 2001, the association faced financial difficulties that threatened the maintenance of the center. However, the required funds, exceeding $360,000, were raised through community support, allowing the association to meet its financial obligations and retain the property.

== Mission ==
- Study and popularization of the Karachay-Balkar language, traditions, history, and religion among the younger generation;
- Support for national dance, folk music, and instrumental training;
- Organizing educational programs, providing scholarships to students, and holding charity camps for children;
- Organizing holidays, memorial days, and religious iftars.
