= Cole Park =

Country house in Wiltshire, England

Coordinates: 51.5662°N 2.0872°W

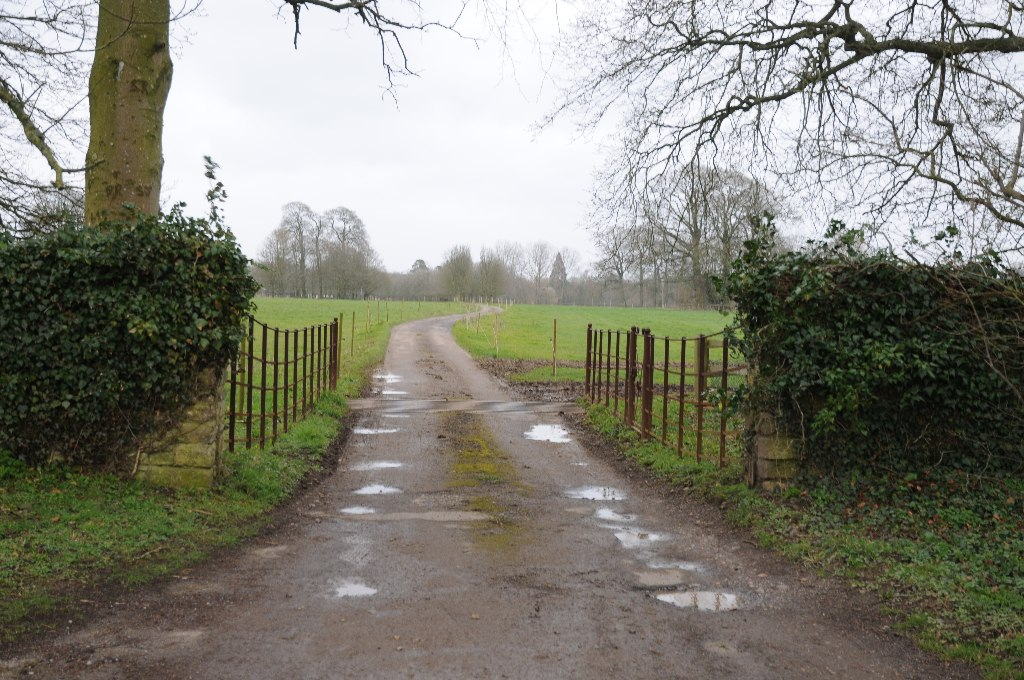
Entrance to Cole Park

Cole Park is a Grade II* listed moated country house off Grange Lane, in the parish of St Paul Malmesbury Without, about 1 1/4 miles (2.0 km) south of Malmesbury, Wiltshire, England. It stands on land once known as Cowfold that was owned in the Middle Ages by the Abbey of Malmesbury, and in the Tudor period was a royal stud.

== History ==
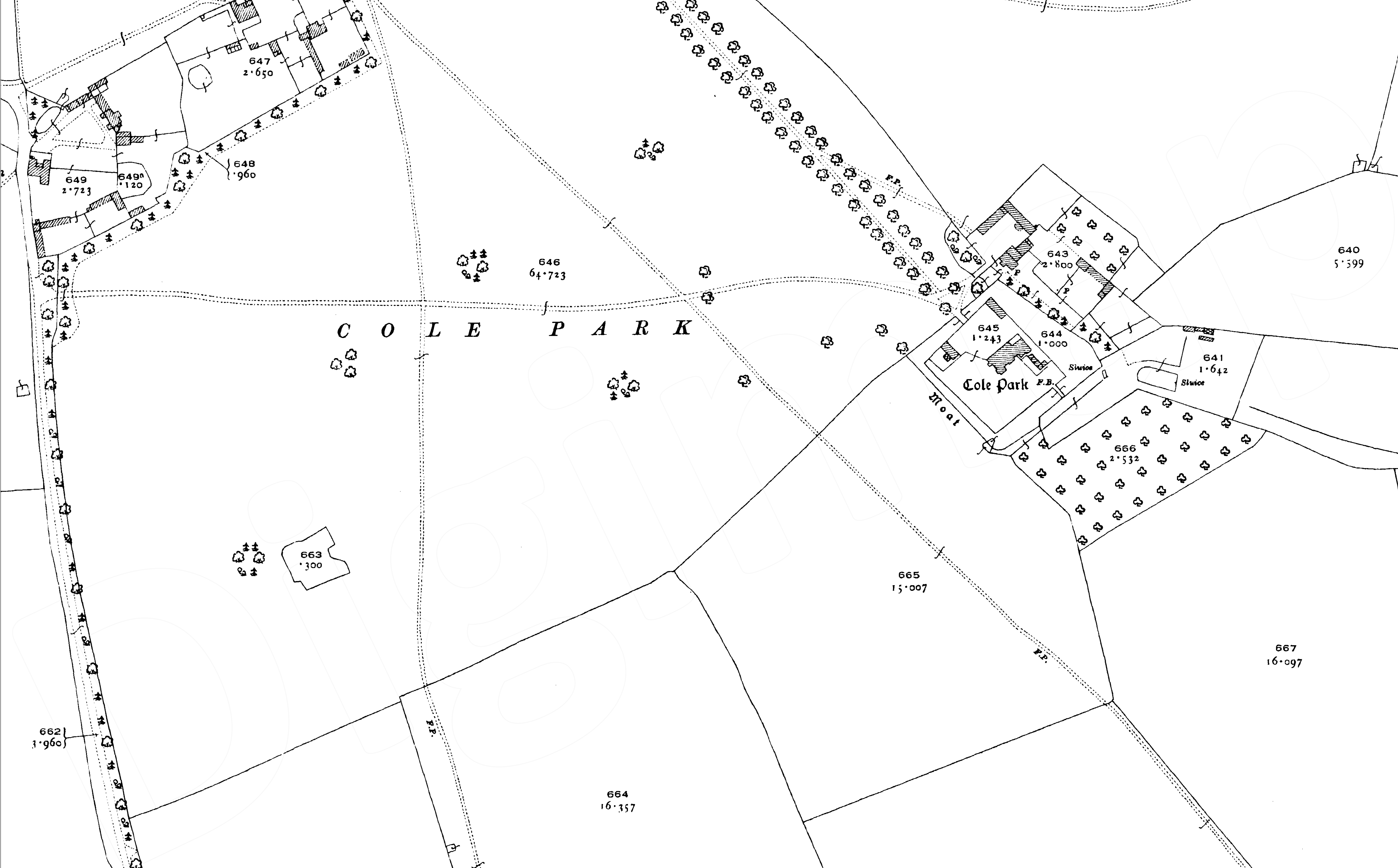
Cole Park on a 1920s Ordnance Survey map

The house is in the grounds of a former medieval monastic deer-park, originally known as Cowfold, once owned by the Abbey of Malmesbury. William of Colerne was the abbot from 1260 to 1296, from whom the name Cole Park may derive. The abbey had a lodge on the site which was still standing in 1540.

The estate was taken by the Crown in the Dissolution of the Monasteries, and in the Tudor period Cole Park was a royal stud-farm, which in 1625 was leased by Sir George Marshall. In the 1650s the Crown sold it to Hugh Audley, and the property passed down to the Harvey and Lovell families until it was sold (together with Rodbourne Rail farm) in 1945.

The earliest extant parts of the house date to the mid-sixteenth century but it has been extensively renovated and changed during its history. The house was altered by John Harvey around 1700 and again in 1775–6 for John and Sarah Lovell. It was repaired in 1796 for Peter Lovell and in the modern era had a complete refurbishment in 1981 by William Bertram. It was purchased by the financier Sir Mark Weinberg and his wife, the designer Anouska Hempel, in the mid-1980s.

The house was recorded as Grade II* listed in 1951.
