= Karachays =

North Caucasian Turkic ethnic group

Къарачайлыла
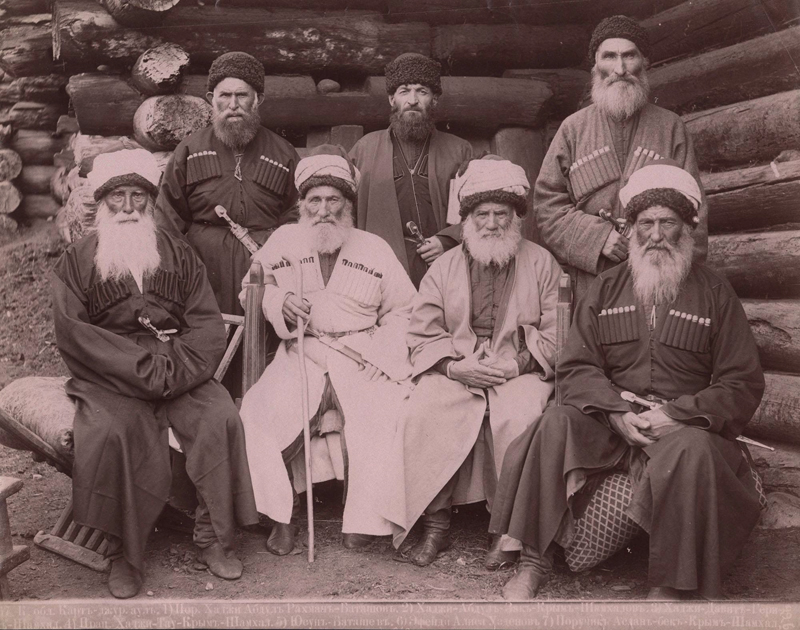
- Karachay elders in the 19th century

Total population
- approx. 250,000

Regions with significant populations
- Russia: Karachay-Cherkessia: 226,271; 205,578
- Turkey: 20,000

Languages
- Karachay-Balkar

Religion
- Sunni Islam

Related ethnic groups
- Balkars; Kumyks; Crimean Tatars; North Caucasian peoples

The Karachays or Karachais (Karachay-Balkar: къарачайлыла, romanized: qaraçaylıla or таулула, tawlula, 'mountaineers') are a North Caucasian-Turkic ethnic group primarily located in their ancestral lands in Karachay–Cherkess Republic, a republic of Russia in the North Caucasus. They and the Balkars have a common origin, culture, and language.

== Ethnonyms and Exonyms ==
The names used by the Karachay-Balkar to refer to themselves (endonym) and the names assigned to them by neighboring Caucasian peoples in their own languages (exonym) are presented in the following table.

Self-Identification and External Names of the Karachay-Balkar
Language	Name
Karachay-Balkars	Malqarlıla, Tawlula, Alan
Mingrelians	Alani
Nogais	Alan
Svans	Az
(Ossetians), Digor	Asiag
(Ossetians), Iron	Asi, Asson
Abkhazians	Azuho, Akarach

== Origin ==
Karachays and Balkars are listed as among the peoples indigenous to the North Caucasus, but their Karachay-Balkar language is unique because it belongs to the Kipchak branch of Turkic family that traced origin to Central and Northern Asia, which has caused numerous debates about how did they undergo Kipchakisation. According to Balkar historian, ethnographer and archaeologist Ismail Miziev who was a specialist in the field of North Caucasian studies, the theories on the origins of the Karachays and the neighboring Balkars is "one of the most difficult problems in Caucasian studies," due to the fact that they are "a Turk-speaking people occupying the most Alpine regions of Central Caucasus, living in an environment of Caucasian and Iranian (Ossetian) languages."

Ankara University's professor Ufuk Tavkul, another specialist, locates the ethnogenesis of Karachays-Balkars and Kumyks inside the Caucasus, not outside; he then succinctly describes the ethnogenesis of peoples of the Caucasus, including the Karachays and Balkars, thus:

In the first millennium before Christ diverse groups representing the ancestors of the Abkhaz/Adyghe, Ossetian and Karachay-Balkar people lived in the Caucasus, who contributed to varying degrees to the emergence of these peoples. From the 7th century BC Kimmerian, Scythian, Sarmatian, Alan, Hun, Bulghar Turk, Avar, Khazar, Pecheneg, Kipchak, etc. groups invaded the Caucasus and settled there, causing a radical change in the ethnic map of the Central Caucasus.
By assimilating the local Caucasian people of Caucasid anthropological features who had brought to life the Koban culture of the Bronze Age, the Ossetians of an Iranian tongue and the Turkic-speaking Karachay-Balkars emerged in the Middle Caucasus. The Ossetian and Karachay-Balkar people and cultures were certainly fundamentally influenced by the Caucasian substratum belonging to the Koban culture (Betrozov 2009: 227)

— "About Karachay-Balkar people: Ethnogenesis", in Sipos & Tavkul (2015), Karachay-Balkar folksongs, p. 44.

Other research by Boulygina et al. (2020) shows Karachays' genetic connection to the pre-historic Koban culture. A genetic study published in the Russian Journal of Genetics in 2019 states the following: "Balkars and Karachays belong to the Caucasian anthropological type. According to the results of craniology, somatology, odontology, and dermatoglyphics, the native (Caucasian) origin of the Balkars and Karachays and their kinship with the representatives of neighboring ethnic groups and a minor role of the Central Asian component in their ethnogenesis were concluded."

Many scientists and historians have made attempts to study the issue, but "the complexity of a problem lead to numerous hypotheses, often contradicting each other." According from Miziev, he concluded that "Balkarians and Karachais are among the most ancient nationalities of Caucasus. The roots of their history and culture are intimately intertwined with the history and culture of many Caucasian peoples, as well as numerous Turk nationalities, from Yakutia to Turkey, from Azerbaijan to Tatarstan, from the Kumik and Nogai to the Altai and Hakass." Via such studies from Miziev, Tavkul, Szczśniak, and other ethnolinguists in Russia, Turkey, and nearby, the emergences of Karachays and Balkars can be attributed to:

- Ancient Caucasian peoples like the Circassians, Georgians, Durdzuks, and Armenians.
- The Turkic Oghuric Bulgars and Khazars who lived in Old Great Bulgaria and Khazar Khaganate. Batbayan was the only one of Kubrat's sons who remained in the Caucasus, while his four brothers moved from North Caucasus and went to the Balkans, the Italian Peninsula, Central Europe and the Volga River; one such entity would become Bulgaria, which was also established by the same Bulgar Turkic people but underwent massive Slavicization to become the Slavic Bulgarians, while another and the last surviving Oghurs are the modern Chuvash people; though some believed the Hungarians also have partial Oghuric roots given Oghuric adaptation and assimilation to other identities.
- The intrusion of the Iranian tribe Alans during the 8th century, and the first wave of Kipchak with their Cuman allies' migration later on. Alania had its capital in Maghas, which some authors and historians locate at today’s Arkhyz, in the mountains currently inhabited by the Karachay-Balkar, while others place it in either what is now modern Ingushetia or North Ossetia.
- The result of Tokhtamysh–Timur war in 1395, which saw Timur crushed Tokhtamysh's Kipchak soldiers and routed them to the mountains; these second wave Kipchaks, now Islamised and distinct from the first Kipchak migration or even ancient Oghuric migration above, brought with them their Borjigin Turco-Mongol heritage and later intermarriages with various tribes, contributed to the Kipchakisation of some group of North Caucasian peoples to form the modern Turco-Mongolised Caucasian-Iranian tribes of Karachays and Balkars.

== History ==
Karachays and Balkars are listed as among the peoples indigenous to the North Caucasus, with deep link to the pre-historic Koban culture. For a long time, they developed fluid and contradicting identities, due living in an environment of Caucasian and Iranian (Ossetian) peoples like Georgians, Armenians, Chechens, Avars and Circassians. The Khazars, an Oghuric Turkic people (distantly related to the Kipchaks), founded their Khaganate in the Caucasus, establishing the Oghuric presences; they were closely linked to the now-Slavicised Bulgarians (via the Bulgars) and possibly the Hungarians. Over time, at least before the 15th century, they were either referred in various umbrellas like "Adzakha", "Alans", "Durdzuks", or sometimes just "Kartvelians".

The state of Alania, founded by the Iranian Alans themselves, was established prior to the Mongol invasions and had its capital in Maghas, which some authors locate in Arkhyz, the mountains currently inhabited by the Karachay, while others place it in either what is now modern Ingushetia or North Ossetia; which Karachays claimed partial ancestry from. In the 14th century, likely around 1395, Alania was destroyed by the Timurid Empire of Timur and the decimated population dispersed into the mountains; some Alanian survivors would go on to become the Ossetians. At the same time, the Kipchak–Karluk war was also in its conclusion, and Tokhtamysh's Kipchak troops suffered tremendous loss under the same Timurid force in the very same Caucasus Mountains, and a number of Kipchak troops were lost to the mountains of Caucasus fleeing Timurid persecution; these soldiers, bringing to them their unique Kipchak Turco-Mongol traditions of the steppe, might have settled and, over time, intermarried with local indigenous population like Circassian, Alan, Durdzuk, Armenian and Georgian populations, and converted them to Islam in process, which caused the emergence of the Karachay and Balkar people as a distinct North Caucasian people with a slight Central and Northern Asian linguistic and cultural heritage.

In the nineteenth century Russia took over the area during the Russian conquest of the Caucasus. On October 20, 1828 the Battle of Khasauka took place, in which the Russian troops were under the command of General Georgy Emanuel. The day after the battle, as Russian troops were approaching the aul of Kart-Dzhurt, the Karachay elders met with the Russian leaders and an agreement was reached for the inclusion of the Karachay into the Russian Empire. After annexation, the self-government of Karachay was left intact, including its officials and courts. Interactions with neighboring Muslim peoples continued to take place based on both folk customs and Sharia law. In Karachay, soldiers were taken from Karachai Amanat, pledged an oath of loyalty, and were assigned arms.

From 1831 to 1860, however, it soon turned out that the Russians had no interests in protecting Karachay and Balkar population, and only wanted to enhance oppression and extortion; as a result, a large portion of Karachays joined the anti-Russian struggles carried out by the North Caucasian peoples as a response. Karachays actively participated in the resistance alongside their neighbors, including the Circassians and Abazins, against Russian colonization. One of the most notable uprisings was the Karachay Uprising of 1855, which was part of a broader North Caucasian rebellion against Russian expansion. During this revolt, Karachay fighters launched attacks on Russian military outposts and played a crucial role in the regional resistance movement.

Between 1861 and 1880, to escape reprisals by the Russian army, some Karachays migrated to the Ottoman Empire although most Karachays remained in their ancestral lands.

In 1930, the Karachay Uprising broke out as a reaction to Soviet collectivization policies. The forced seizure of land, grain requisitioning, and repression of rural elites sparked armed resistance among Karachay peasants, particularly kulaks and middle peasants. The uprising began in March 1930, with rebels seizing several key towns, including Mikoyan-Shahar (now Karachayevsk), Kislovodsk, and Batalpashinsk (now Cherkessk). The Soviet government responded swiftly, deploying Red Army forces to crush the rebellion. By April 1930, the uprising was brutally suppressed, with many insurgents executed or imprisoned. This event was part of the broader anti-Soviet resistance in the North Caucasus during Stalin's early rule.

All Karachay officials were purged by early 1938, and the entire nation was administered by NKVD officers, none of whom were Karachay. In addition, the entire intelligentsia, all rural officials and at least 8,000 ordinary farmers were arrested, including 875 women. Most were executed, but many were sent to prison camps throughout the Caucasus.

During the parade of sovereignties and the collapse of the USSR on November 30, 1990, KCHAO withdrew from the Stavropol Territory and became the Karachay-Cherkess Soviet Socialist Republic (KChSSR) as part of the RSFSR, which was approved by a resolution of the Supreme Council of the RSFSR on July 3, 1991.

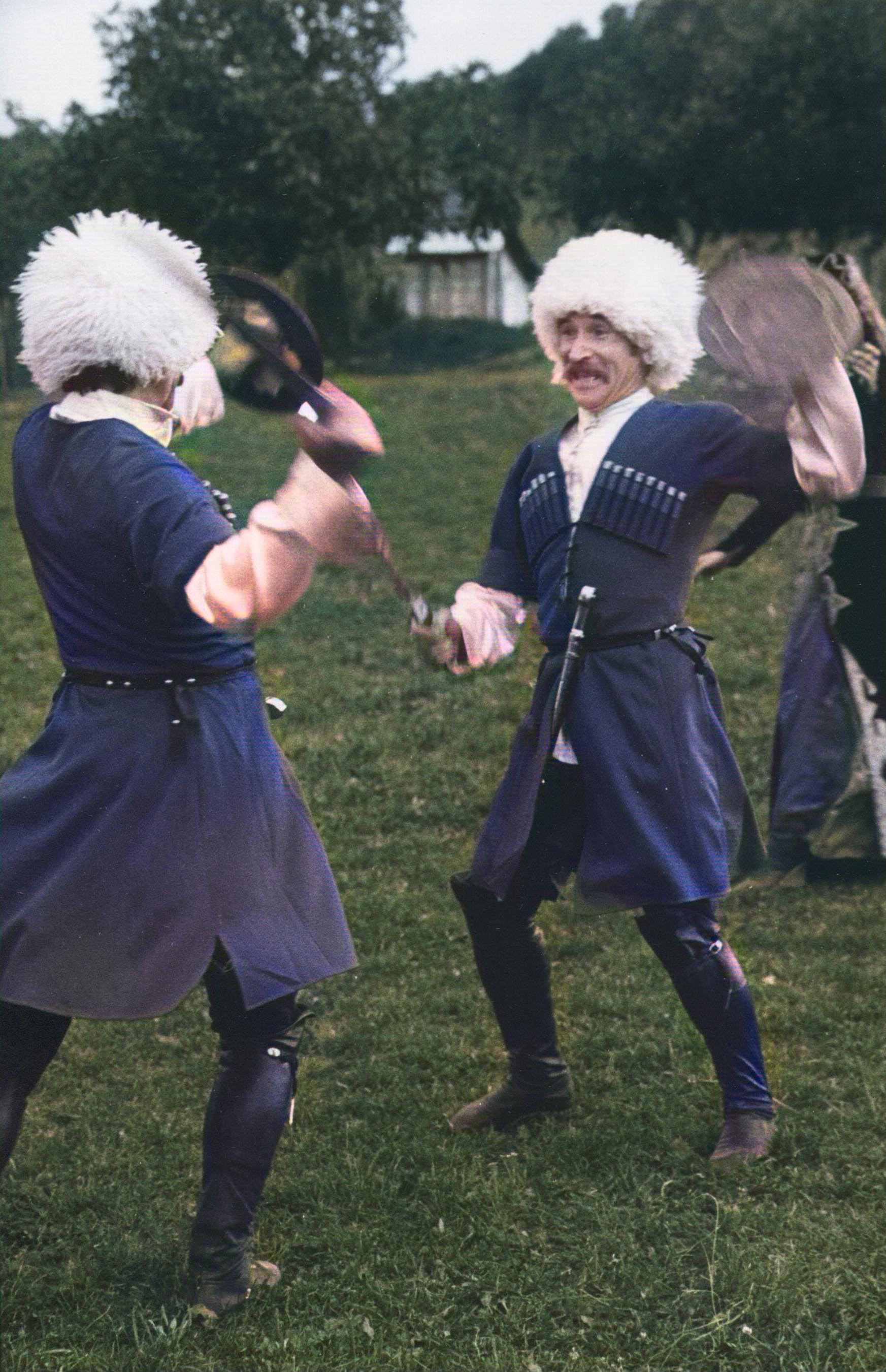
Karachay sword fighters (folklore ensemble)

In 1989–1997, the Karachay national movements appealed to the leadership of the RSFSR with a request to restore a separate autonomy of Karachay.

On November 18, 1990, at the congress of Karachay deputies of all levels, the Karachay Soviet Socialist Republic (since October 17, 1991 — the Karachay Republic) was proclaimed as part of the RSFSR, which was not recognized by the leadership of the RSFSR. On March 28, 1992, a referendum was held in which, according to the official results, the majority of the population of Karachay-Cherkessia opposed the division. The division was not legalized, and a single Karachay-Cherkessia remained.

=== Deportation ===
In 1942 the Germans permitted the establishment of a Karachay National Committee to administer their "autonomous region"; the Karachays were also allowed to form their own police force and establish a brigade that was to fight with the Wehrmacht. This relationship with Nazi Germany resulted, when the Russians regained control of the region in November 1943, with the Karachays being charged with collaboration with Nazi Germany and deported. Originally restricted only to family members of rebel bandits during World War II, the deportation was later expanded to include the entire Karachay ethnic group. The Soviet government refused to acknowledge that 20,000 Karachays served in the Red Army, greatly outnumbering the 3,000 estimated to have collaborated with the German soldiers. Karachays were forcibly deported and resettled in Central Asia, mostly in Kazakhstan and Kirghizia. In the first two years of the deportations, disease and famine caused the death of 35% of the population; of 28,000 children, 78%, or almost 22,000 perished.

=== Diaspora ===
About 10,000–15,756 Karachays and Balkars emigrated to the Ottoman Empire, with their migration reaching peaks in 1884–87, 1893, and 1905–06.

Karachays were also forcibly displaced to the Central Asian republics of Uzbekistan, Kazakhstan and Kirghizia during Joseph Stalin's relocation campaign in 1944. Since the Nikita Khrushchev era in the Soviet Union, the majority of Karachays have been repatriated to their homeland from Central Asia. Today, there are sizable Karachay communities in Turkey (centered on Afyonkarahisar), Uzbekistan, the United States, and Germany.

In the United States, there is an organization called the American Karachay-Kavkaz Benevolent Association, which advocates for the preservation of the culture of the Karachay people.

== Geography ==
The Karachay nation, along with the Balkars occupy the valleys and foothills of the Central Caucasus in the river valleys of the Kuban, Big Zelenchuk River, Malka, Baksan, Cherek, and others.

The Karachays are proud of the symbol of their nation, Mount Elbrus, the highest mountain in Europe, with an altitude of 5,642 meters.

== Culture ==
Like other peoples in the mountainous Caucasus, the relative isolation of the Karachay allowed them to develop their particular cultural practices, despite general accommodation with surrounding groups.

Karachay people live in communities that are divided into families and clans (tukums). A tukum is based on a family's lineage and there are roughly thirty-two Karachay tukums. Prominent tukums include: Abayhan, Aci, Batcha (Batca), Baychora, Bayrimuk (Bayramuk), Bostan, Catto (Jatto), Cosar (Çese), Duda, Hubey (Hubi), Karabash, Kochkar, Laypan, Lepshoq, Ozden (Uzden), Silpagar, Tebu, Teke, Toturkul, Urus.

=== Language ===
Karachays speak the Karachay-Balkar language, which comes from the northwestern branch of Turkic languages. The Kumyks, who live in northeast Dagestan, speak a closely related language, the Kumyk language.

=== Religion ===
The majority of the Karachay are followers of Islam. Some Karachays began adopting Islam in the 17th and 18th centuries due to contact with the Kumyks, Nogais, the Crimean Tatars, and most significantly, the Circassians. The Sufi Qadiriya order has a presence in the region.

== See also ==
- Osman Kasaev
- Karachay horse
- Alans
- Balkar and Karachay nationalism
- Deportation of the Karachays
