= Karachay Uprising of 1855 =

Karachay Uprising (1855)
- Part of the Caucasian War and Russo-Circassian War
Date	August 1855
Location	Karachay
Result	Russian victory

Belligerents
Karachay forces Caucasian Imamate	Russian Empire

Commanders and leaders
Muhammad Hubiev; Muhammad Amin Asiyalav	(Russian Empire) Kozlovsky, Vikenty Mikhailovich (Russian Empire) Alexey Gramotin (Russian Empire) Nikolai Evdokimov (Russian Empire) Kaziy-Girey (Russian Empire) Dmitry Yagotinov

Strength
3,000–6,000	4,000–10,000 (Estimate)

Casualties and losses
230–335 killed 130–190 wounded 36 captured	165–180 killed 280–335 wounded

The Karachay Uprising of 1855 was a rebellion by the Karachay people and Circassian mountain tribes against the Russian Empire during the Caucasian War. This uprising took place in August 1855 in what is now the Karachay-Cherkess Republic. It was organized by the naib (deputy) of Imam Shamil, Muhammad Amin, alongside Muhammad Efendi Hubiev, a spiritual leader of the Karachay people. The primary goal was to expel Russian influence from the region and unite the local forces with those of Imam Shamil.

== Background ==
The roots of Karachay collaboration with Shamil's naibs can be traced to the early 1840s when Haji Muhammad, the first naib of Imam Shamil in the North-West Caucasus, established connections with the Karachay people. In 1842, Russian officials reported concerns about the Karachays’ intent to support Haji Muhammad if he entered their territory with a group of resistance fighters. After Haji Muhammad's death, Shamil sent a new naib, Suleiman Efendi Mustafinov, to reinforce relations with sympathetic Karachays and strengthen the coordination of local mountain forces across the Kuban region.

By the mid-1850s, Muhammad Amin had become a prominent naib, drawing support from various mountain communities, including the Karachays, who supplied him with resources such as lead. Control over the Karachay region was crucial to Muhammad Amin's strategy, as it would facilitate the unification of his forces with Shamil's, creating a solid front against Russian advances.

== Uprising Events ==
On August 10, 1855, Muhammad Amin crossed the Laba River with his forces and, on August 15, reached Teberda. At the same time, Magomet Efendi Hubiev sent emissaries across Karachay villages, urging the population to rally against Russian oppression.

Russian forces, led by General Vincens Kozlovsky and General Alexey Gramotin, quickly mobilized in response. Reinforcements, including 10 Hopersky Cossack companies (totaling 1,251 Cossacks and officers), were deployed to key positions near Khumar fortifications to monitor and control access routes.

On August 17, Muhammad Amin entered Karachay, capturing a Russian transport caravan near the Eshkakon River. Most Karachay youth joined his cause. Hearing of this intrusion, General Kozlovsky took action, deploying his forces to prevent further advances.

The Russian military strategy included setting ambushes and fortifying positions along key mountain passes. Cossack units occupied strategic areas such as the Amankhita gorges and the Kuban River banks, attempting to trap Muhammad Amin's forces in the Teberda Gorge. After several skirmishes and a prolonged five-hour battle near the Kuban, the mountain fighters were forced to retreat.

== Aftermath ==
On August 23, 1855, Russian forces, now bolstered by additional Hopersky Cossacks and two infantry battalions, launched a final offensive. They moved toward the Kadyko Valley, where Muhammad Amin and his supporters had fortified their position. Following a fierce seven-hour battle, the Russian Cossacks broke through the defenses, forcing Muhammad Amin to retreat across the Kuban River. Muhammad Efendi Hubiev escaped to Abkhazia.

In the aftermath, the Russian Empire imposed a heavy indemnity on the Karachay people as punishment for the uprising. This decisive defeat weakened the Karachay resistance and underscored the difficulty local mountain tribes faced in unifying against the more technologically advanced Russian forces.

== Legacy ==
The Karachay Uprising of 1855 represents a significant chapter in the larger resistance efforts of the North Caucasus during the Caucasian War. Although ultimately unsuccessful, it demonstrated the determination of the Karachay and other mountain tribes to oppose Russian expansion and protect their autonomy.
