= La Vieille Fille (novel) =

1837 novel by Honoré de Balzac

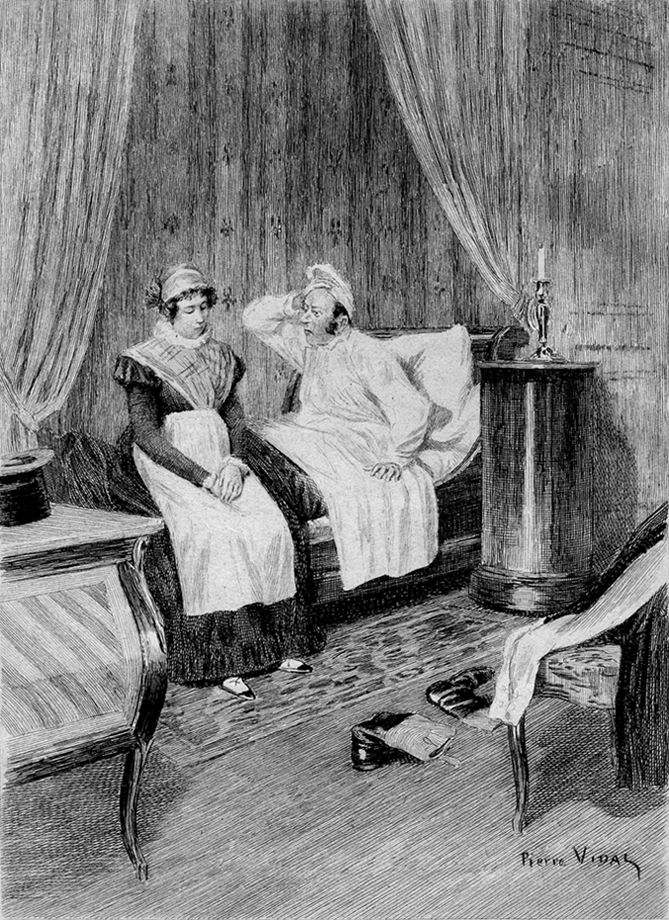
- Image from La Vieille Fille
- Author: Honoré de Balzac
- Illustrator: Pierre Vidal
- Language: French
- Series: La Comédie humaine
- Publisher: Edmond Werdet
- Publication date: 1837
- Publication place: France
- Media type: Print
- Preceded by: La Muse du département
- Followed by: Le Cabinet des Antiques

La Vieille Fille (French pronunciation: [la vjɛj fij], The Old Maid or An Old Maid) is a novel by the French writer Honoré de Balzac. Written in 1836, it was first published as a serial in La Presse, then published by Edmond Werdet in 1837 in Études de mœurs, in the section les Scènes de la vie de province. La Vieille Fille was republished in 1839 by éditions Charpentier, before being published alongside le Cabinet des Antiques in the isolated les Rivalités group within Scènes de la vie de province in la Comédie humaine, published in 1844 by édition Furne.

The work was dedicated to Balzac's brother in law, an engineer in the corps royal des ponts et chaussées, Eugène Midy de la Greneraye Surville. Even so, Balzac offered its manuscript to comtesse Guidoboni-Visconti, in 1844.

This short and incisive novel stands out for the density of its story and its rapid succession of events. Balzac takes time to carefully describe the house of Mademoiselle Cormon, the old maid, in the city of Alençon, before entering directly into the heart of the matter.

The portrait of Mademoiselle Cormon is one of the most successful in The Human Comedy. Balzac delivers in this novel one of his most nuanced analysis of a provincial town's social, political and financial affairs.

== Bibliography ==
- R. Butler, « Restoration Perspectives in Balzac’s La Vieille Fille », Modern Languages: Journal of the Modern Language Association, 1976, n° 57, p. 126-31.
- (in French)René Guise, « Balzac et Le Charivari en 1837 », L'Année balzacienne, 1985, n° 5, p. 133-54.
- Fredric Jameson, « The Ideology of Form: Partial Systems in La Vieille Fille », Sub-stance: A Review of Theory and Literary Criticism, 1976, n° 15, p. 29-49.
- Fredric Jameson, « The Political Unconscious », The Novel: An Anthology of Criticism and Theory, 1900-2000, éd. et intro. Dorothy J. Hale, Malden, Blackwell, 2006, p. 413-33.
- (in French)Patricia Kinder, « Un Directeur de journal, ses auteurs et ses lecteurs en 1836 : autour de La Vieille Fille », L’Année balzacienne, 1972, p. 173-200.
- (in French) Nicole Moret, « Alençon, ville-corps », L’Année balzacienne, 1985, n° 5: 297–305.
- (in French) Armine Kotin Mortimer, « Le Corset de La Vieille Fille », L’Œuvre d’identité : essais sur le romantisme de Nodier à Baudelaire, éd. et intro. Didier Maleuvre, éd. et intro. Catherine Nesci, Montréal, Université de Montréal, 1996, p. 39-48
- Allan H. Pasco, « Dying with Love in Balzac’s La Vieille Fille », L’Esprit Créateur, Winter 1995, n° 35 (4), p. 28-37.
- (in French) Lise Queffélec, « La Vieille Fille ou la science des mythes en roman-feuilleton », L’Année balzacienne, 1988, n° 9, p. 163-77.
- Christopher Whalen Rivers, Face value : physiognomical thought and the legible body in Marivaux, Lavater, Balzac, Gautier, and Zola, Madison, University of Wisconsin Press, 1994 ISBN 9780299143947
- Michael Tilby, « Balzac and the Poetics of Ignorance : La Vieille Fille », Modern Language Review, oct 2005, n° 100 (4), p. 954-70.
