= Kuliev =

The surnames Kuliev, Kuliyev and Kouliev are derived from the variants of the Turkic Quli. The surname Guliev is of the same origin, and both can be transliterated from the native languages as Quliyev. These surnames may refer to the following notable people:

- Alim Kouliev
- Awdy Kulyýew
- Azamat Kuliev
- Begençmuhammet Kulyýew
- Eldar Kuliev
- Eldar Kuliyev
- Kaisyn Kuliev
- Rafat Kuliev

== See also ==
- Kuliev Cavalry Group
