= Guliyev =

The surnames Guliev, Guliyev, also latinized as Gouliyev, etc. are slavicised from the variants of the Turkic Quli. Its female version is Guliyeva. The surname Kuliev is of the same origin, and both can be transliterated from the native languages as Quliyev.

The surname may refer to the following notable people:

- Adil Guliyev (1922–1992), Azerbaijani Soviet Air Force officer
- Ayaz Guliyev (born 1996), Azerbaijani Russian footballer
- Ayyub Guliyev (born 1954), Azerbaijani astrophysicist
- Dagib Guliev (1956–1991), Soviet alpine skier
- Elchin Musaoglu (Guliyev) (born 1966), Azerbaijani filmmaker
- Emin Guliyev, several people
  - Emin Quliyev (born 1977), Azerbaijani footballer
  - Emin Guliyev (swimmer) (born 1975), Azerbaijani swimmer
- Emil Guliyev (born 1990), Azerbaijani filmmaker
- Eshgin Guliyev (born 1990), Azerbaijani footballer
- Farid Guliyev (born 1986), Azerbaijani footballer
- Firidun Guliyev (born 1994), Azerbaijani weightlifter
- Fuad Guliyev (born 1941), Azerbaijani politician
- Ilhama Guliyeva (1943–2016), Azerbaijani celebrity
- Irada Guliyeva (born 1973), Azerbaijani footballer
- Kamal Guliyev (born 1976), Azerbaijani footballer
- Namig Guliyev (born 1974), Azerbaijani chess player
- Ramil Guliyev (born 1990), Turkish Azerbaijani runner
- Rasul Guliyev (born 1947), Azerbaijani politician
- Roza Guliyeva (born 1998), Azerbaijani footballer
- Tarlan Guliyev (born 1992), Azerbaijani footballer
- Tofig Guliyev (1917–2000), Azerbaijani composer
- Vagif Guliyev (born 1957), Azerbaijani mathematician
- Vilayat Guliyev (born 1952), Azerbaijani diplomat
- Zafar Guliyev (born 1972), Azerbaijani wrestler
- Zahra Guliyeva (born 1951), Azerbaijani violinist, concertmaster and professor

== See also ==
- Bank Respublika, a bank in Azerbaijan majority owned by the Guliyev family
