= Kaisyn Kuliev =

Soviet writer (1917–1985)

- Born: November 1, 1917; Upper Chegem, Terek Oblast, Mountainous Republic of the Northern Caucasus
- Died: June 4, 1985 (aged 67); Chegem, Kabardino-Balkarian ASSR, RSFSR, Soviet Union
- Education: Maxim Gorky Literature Institute
- Occupations: Poet, writer, journalist, war correspondent
- Spouse: Maka Dahkilgova
- Children: Eldar Kuliev; Alim Kouliev; Azamat Kuliev
- Writing career
- Notable awards: State Prizes of the Soviet Republics (1966); USSR State Prize (1974); Lenin Prize (1977)
- Website: k-kuliev.ru

Signature
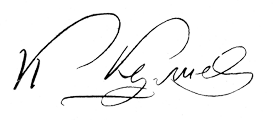

Kaisyn Shuvayevich Kuliev or Qaysin Quli (Russian: Кайсы́н Шува́евич Кули́ев, romanized: Kaisyn Shuvayevich Kuliyev; Karachay-Balkar: Къулийланы Шууаны жашы Къайсын, romanized: Quliylanı Şuwanı caşı Qaysın; 1 November 1917 – 4 June 1985) was a Balkar poet. He wrote in the Karachay-Balkar language. His poems are widely translated to most languages in the former Soviet Union, including Russian, Ossetian, Lithuanian, Belarusian, Armenian. Kuliev's books have been published in 140 languages in Europe, Asia, and America.

== Early life ==
Kaisyn Kuliev (Quli) was born on November 1, 1917, in a Balkar aul Upper Chegem to a family of stock-breeders and hunters. He spent his childhood in the mountains. He was orphaned at an early age and started to work. In 1926 a school was established in his aul, and he started to read and study Russian. By age ten, he had written his first poems. After graduation from school, he entered a technical college in Nalchik and first published at age 17.

In 1935 Kuliev arrived in Moscow and entered the Russian Institute of Theatre Arts (GITIS). He attended lectures at the Maxim Gorky Literature Institute and continued to write.

== Career ==
In 1939 he returned to Nalchik, where he taught literature at the local teachers' training college. In 1940, he published his first book of poetry, Hello, Morning!.

In 1940 Kuliev was drafted into the Red Army, where he served in the paratrooper brigade. In the summer of 1941, his brigade was transferred to Latvian SSR. He was wounded in a battle near Oryol. While in the hospital Kaisyn Kuliev wrote many poems that were published in Pravda, and Krasnaya Zvezda. He participated in the Battle of Stalingrad as a military correspondent for the Syny Otechestva newspaper. In the operation to liberate southern cities, Kuliev was wounded again.

During the period between 1942 and 1944, he wrote In an hour of Trouble, About Someone Who Didn't Return, and Perekop. In 1944, Joseph Stalin ordered deportation of the Balkar ethnic group to Kyrgyzstan and Kazakhstan. Although Boris Pasternak managed to secure a permit for Kuliev to stay in Moscow, in 1945, Kuliev chose to live in Kyrgyzstan, where he worked in the local Union of Writers. In Frunze, he married an Ingush girl, Maka. The Ingush ethnic group was also deported by Stalin to Central Asia. Since Kaisyn Kuliev's poetry could not be published, because he belonged to a deported people, he translated others' poetry. Pasternak, in his letters, encouraged the younger poet to have faith in a better future.

In May 1956, Kuliev went to Moscow, and in 1957 he published Mountains and The Bread and the Rose (1957) with the help of Russian poet Nikolai Tikhonov. In 1956, Balkars were allowed to return to their native places and Kuliev returned to Nalchik where he published his collections The Wounded Stone (1964), The Book of the Land (1972), The Evening (1974), The Evening Light (1979), A Beauty of the Earth (1980), and others. Kuliev's poetry was recognized by Soviet officials when Stalin's era ended, and he was posthumously honored with State Prizes of the Soviet Republics (1966), USSR State Prize (1974) and also Lenin Prize but only in 1990. His Russian translators included Naum Grebnev, Bella Akhmadulina, Nahum Korzhavin and Oleg Chukhontsev.

Kaisyn Kuliev died in 1985 and was buried in the garden of his house. The Kaisyn Kuliev Memorial Museum now operates at that location. One of the major streets of Nalchik, the capital of Kabardino-Balkaria, was named after the poet. Balkar Theater of Drama in Nalchik was named for him. His poetry presents "lessons of courage, nobleness and honour".

== Bibliography ==
=== Poetry translated into English ===
KULIYEV, KAISYN. Grass and Stone. Selected Poems. Translated by Olga Shartse. Vestnik Kavkaza, Pyatigorsk, Russia, 2007. Bilingual edition. Translation into Russian by Naum Grebnev, Oleg Chukhontsev, Vera Zvyagintseva. 298 pp.

KULIEV, KAISYN. Grass and Stone. Translated By Olga Shartse. Selected Poems. Moscow, Progress Publishers, 1977

=== Selected poetry translated into Russian ===
- Prislushaisia k slovam (Listen the Words) 2002 introduction by Chinghiz Aitmatov
- Chelovek. Ptitsa. Derevo. (The Man. The Bird. The Tree.) 1985
- Kolosia i zvezdi (Ears and Stars) 1979
- Sobranie sochineniy v trekh tomakh (The Collected Works In Three Volumes). 1976–1977. Introduction by Irakly Andronikov.
- Zhivu Sredi Ludey (I Live Alone a People) 1976
- Lirika (Lyric) 1974
- Zvezdam goret (The Stars Will Shine) 1973
- Izbrannie proizvedenia d dvukh tomakh (Selected Works In Two Volumes) 1972
- Blagodaru Solntse (I Thank the Sun) 1969
- Mir Domu Tvoemu (Peace to Your House) 1966
- Zaveschanniy Mir (Bequeathing World) 1965
- Izbrannaia Lirika (The Lyrics) 1964
- Zelenaia skazka (The Green Fairytale)
- Gory (The Mountains) 1957

=== Selected poetry translated to other languages ===
- Ogon na skale (Fire On The Rock) Frunze, Kyrgyzstan, 1969.

=== Prose written in Russian ===
- Mir I Radost Vam Zhivuschie (The Peace And Gladness to You Who Live) 2007
- Byla zima (It Was a Winter)
- Poet vsegda s liudmi (The Poet Always With a People) 1986
- Tak rastet i derevo (And Tree is Growing So) 1975
