= Bakov =

Bakov (Russian: Баков) is a Russian masculine surname, its feminine counterpart is Bakova. It may refer to

- Anka Bakova (born 1957), Bulgarian rower
- Anton Bakov (born 1965), Russian politician and monarchist
- Rustam Bakov (born 1983), Russian football midfielder

== See also ==
- Bakov nad Jizerou, a town in Czech Republic
