= Los Caños de Meca =

Village in the Province of Cádiz, Spain

Coordinates: 36°11′09″N 6°00′39″W

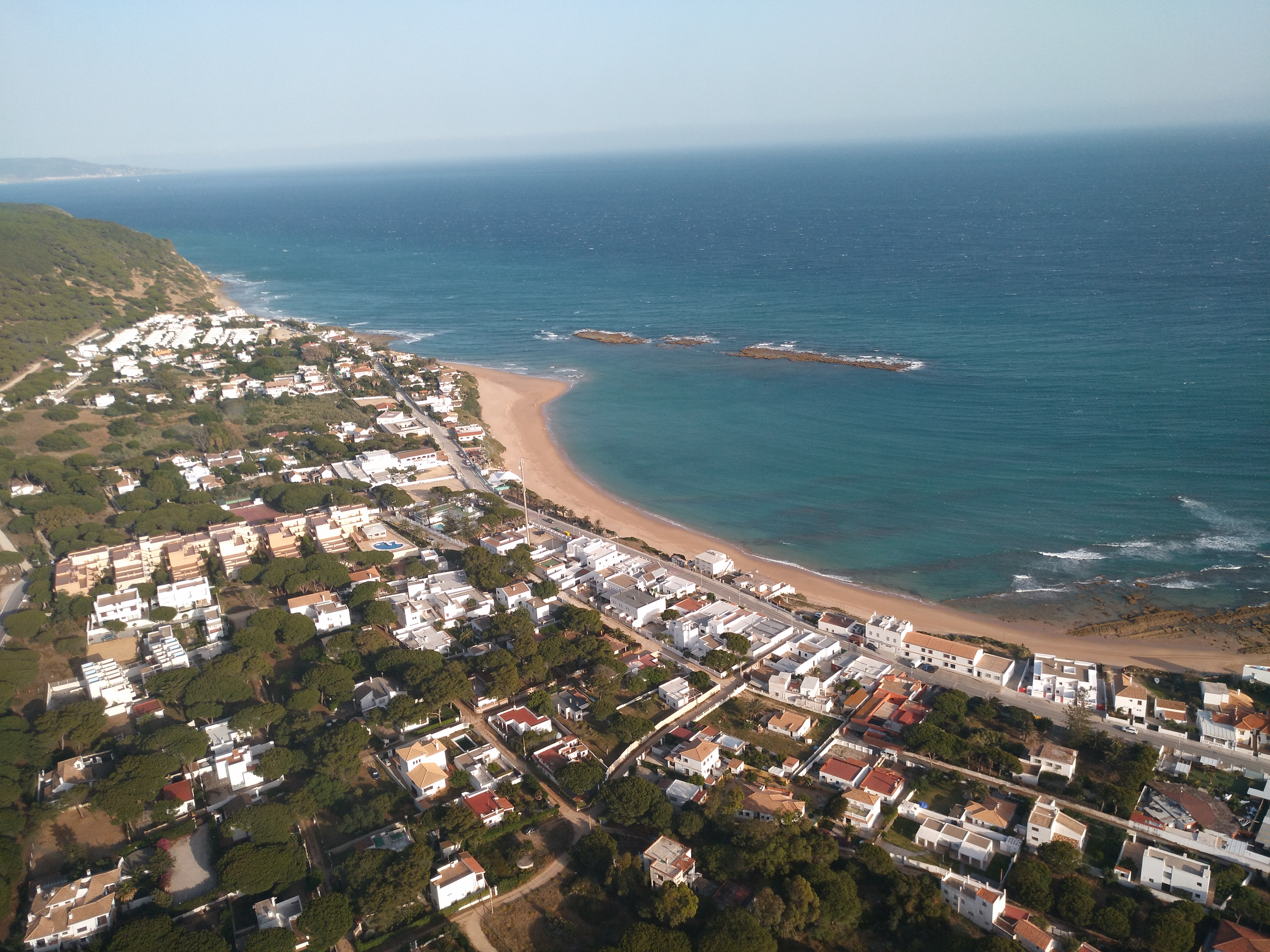
Los Caños de Meca

Los Caños de Meca is a small seaside village to the east of Cape Trafalgar on the Costa de la Luz of Spain. It is part of the Province of Cádiz and the autonomous region of Andalusia.

Los Caños de Meca history is related to the Straits of Gibraltar, the Roman Fretus Herculeum and the Arab Boughaz el Tarek. Also the Battle of Trafalgar was fought near the coast of Caños de Meca, off the Cape of Trafalgar, over 200 years ago, 21 October 1805.

== Notable people ==
- Muhadin Kishev, Soviet and Spanish artist, born 1938.
- Lara Fernández Castrelo, Spanish singer, songwriter and record producer known as Judeline, born 2003.
