= Nalchik =

Capital of Kabardino-Balkaria in the Russian North Caucasus

Nalchik Нальчик
- City

Other transcription(s)
  - Kabardian: НалщӀэч
  - Balkar: Нальчик
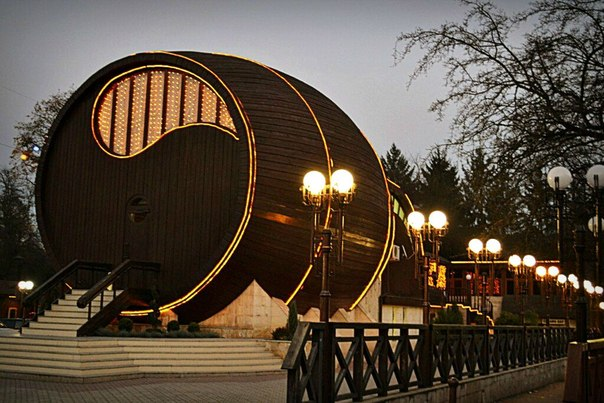
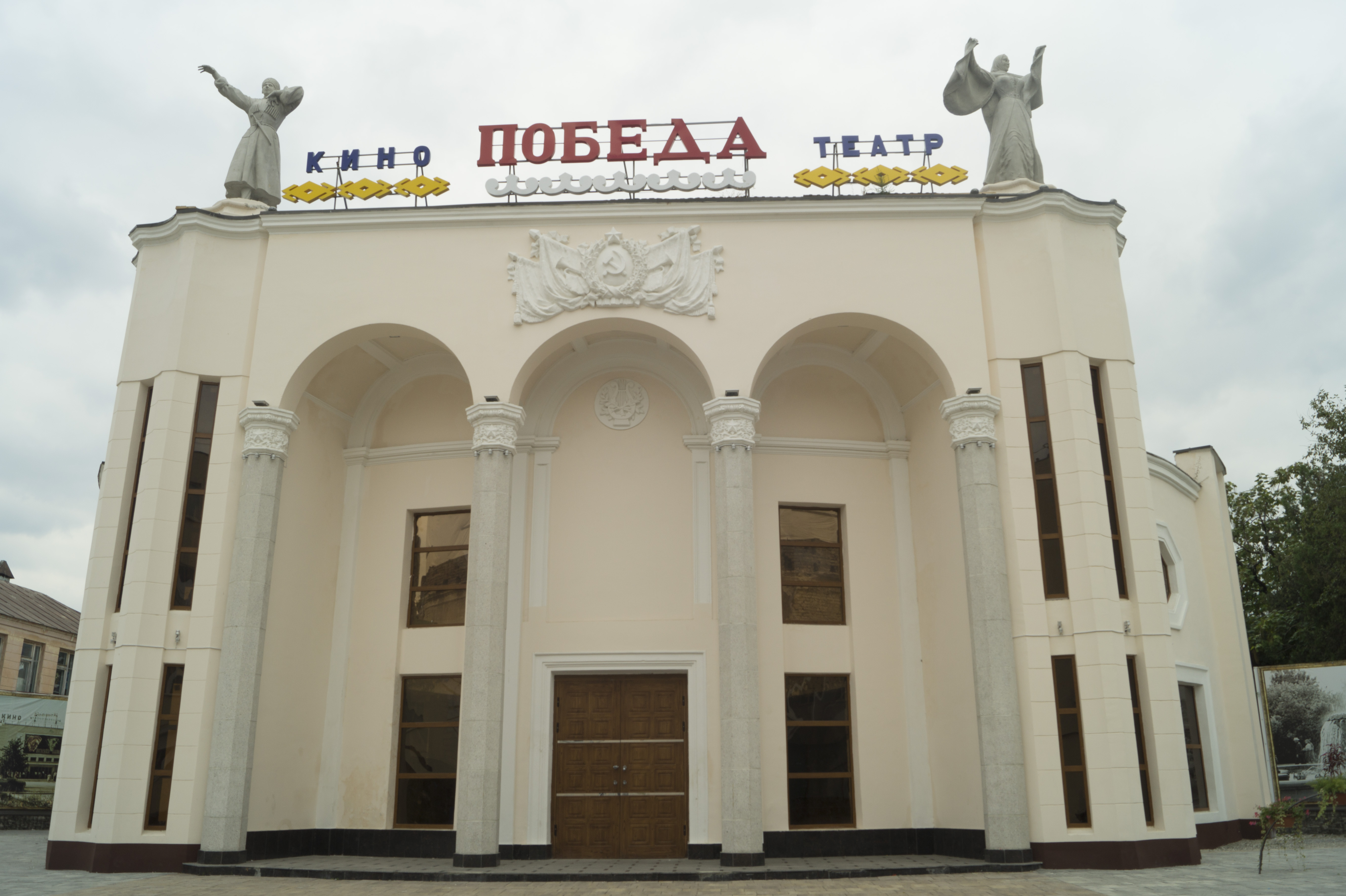
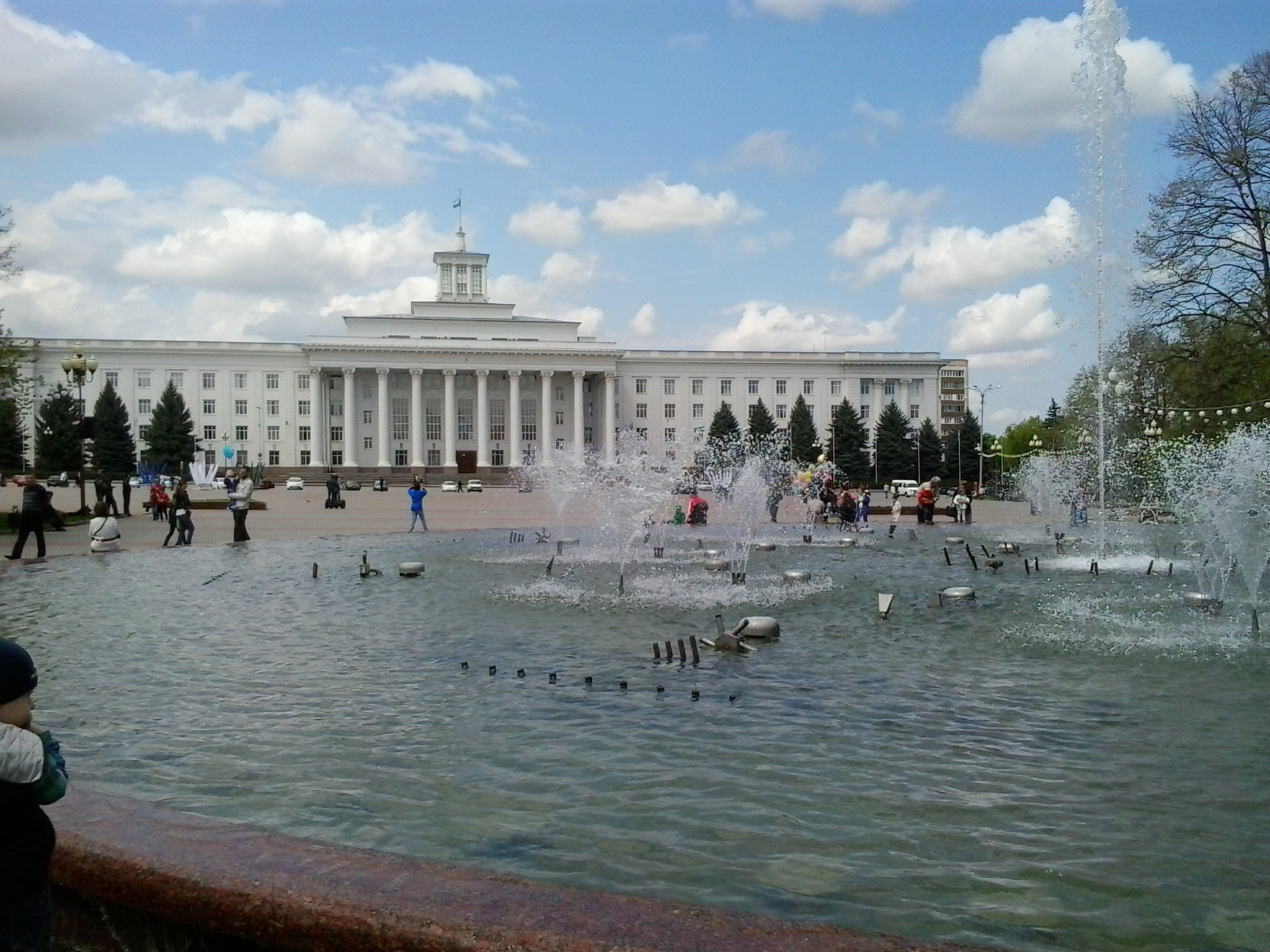
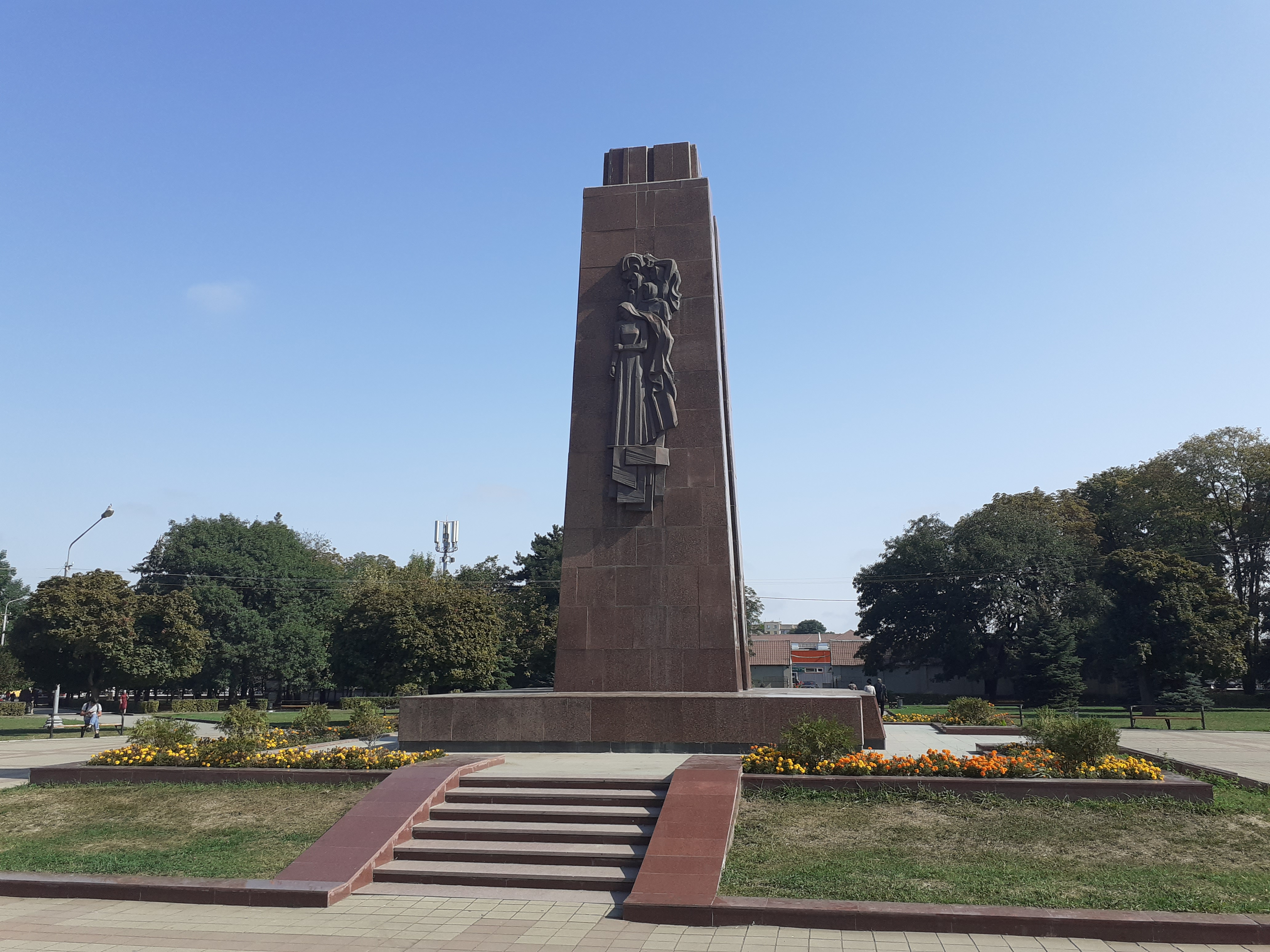
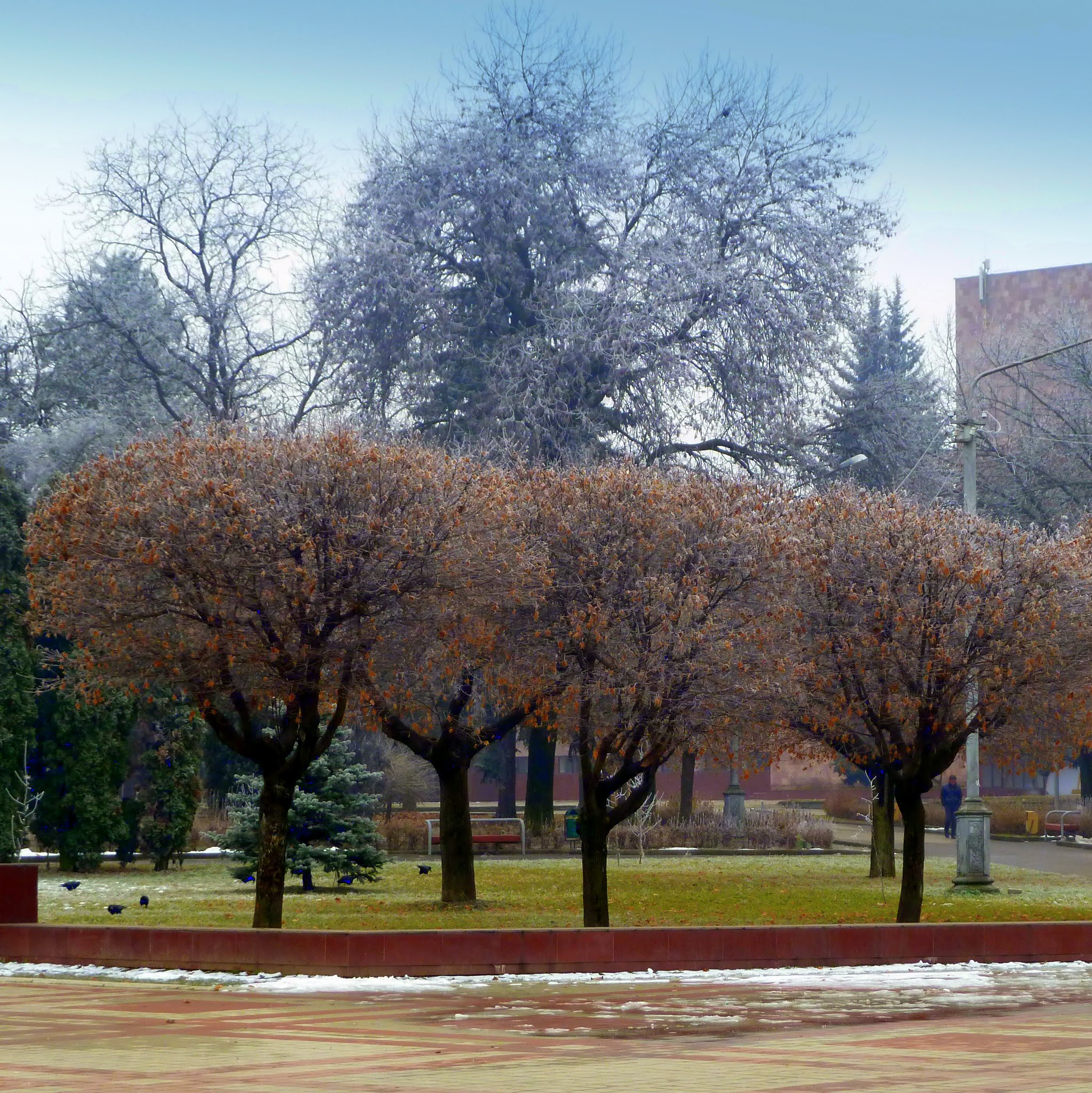
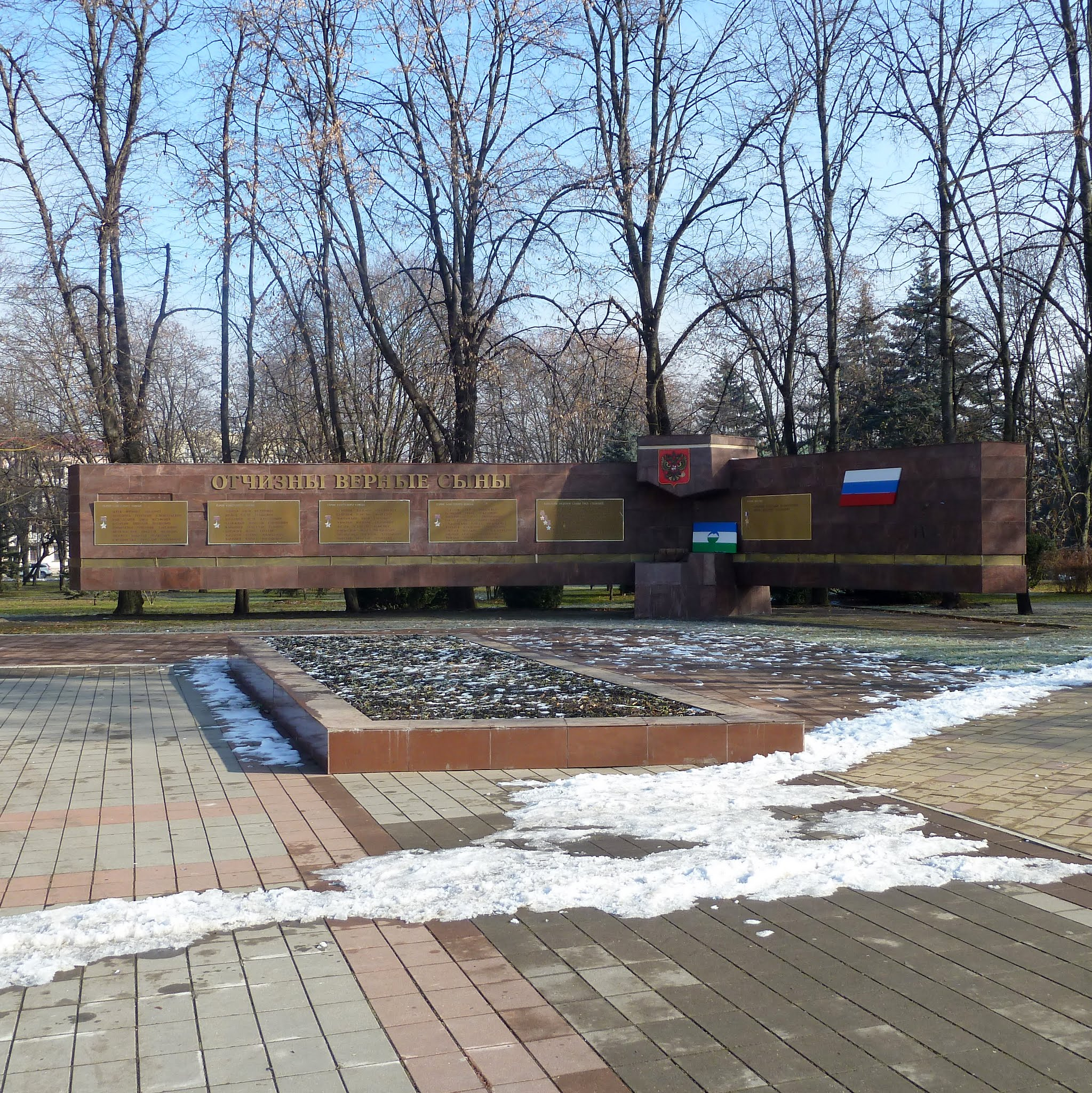
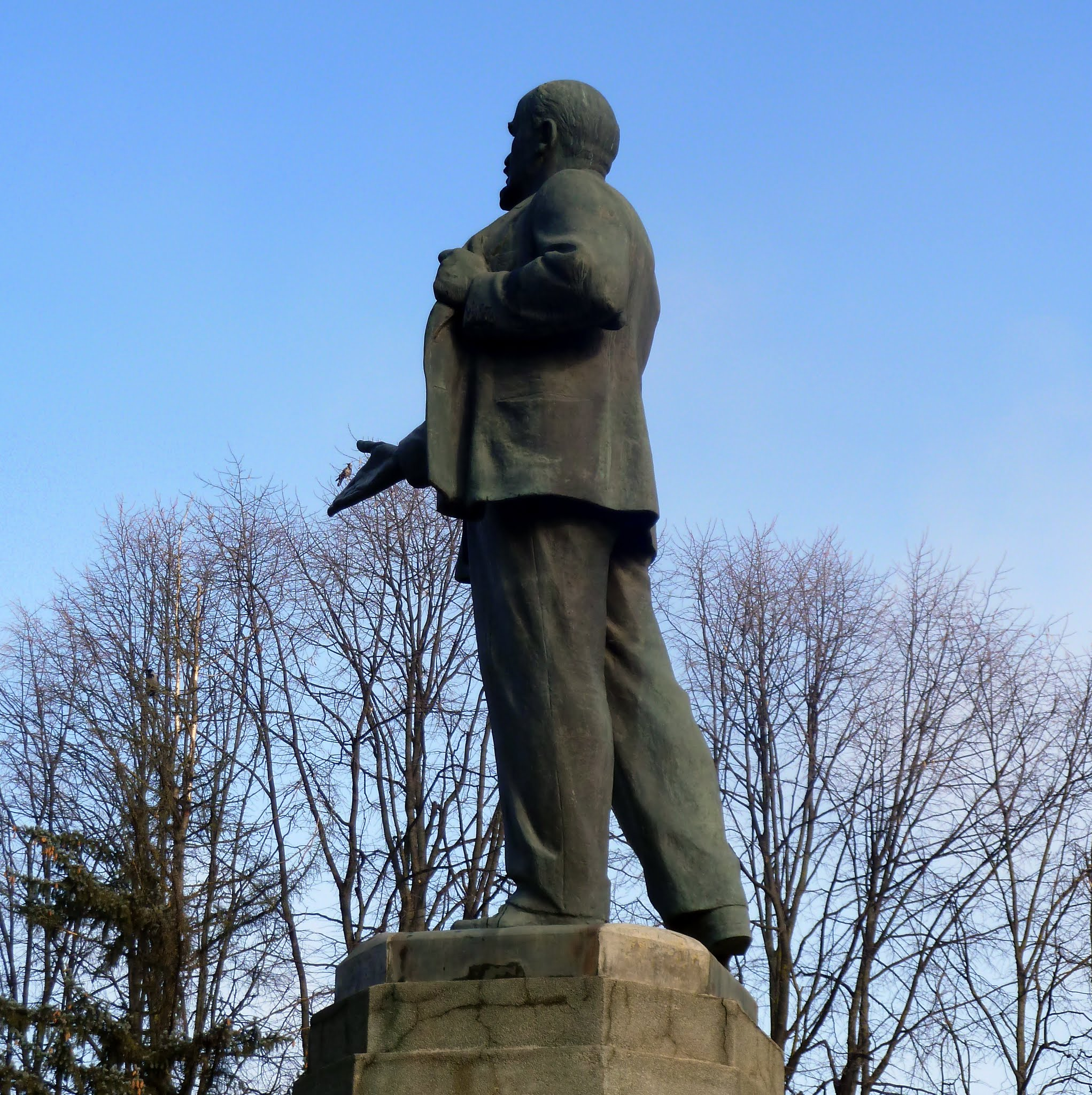
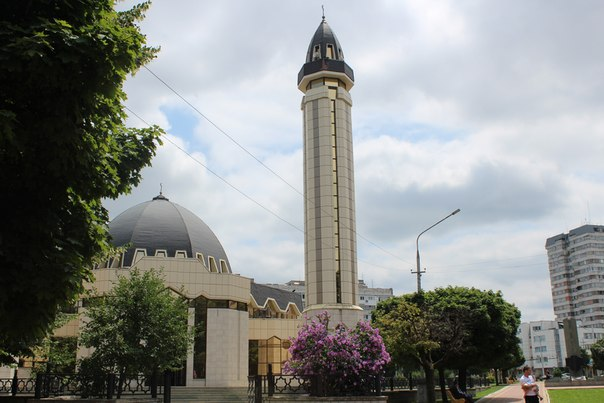
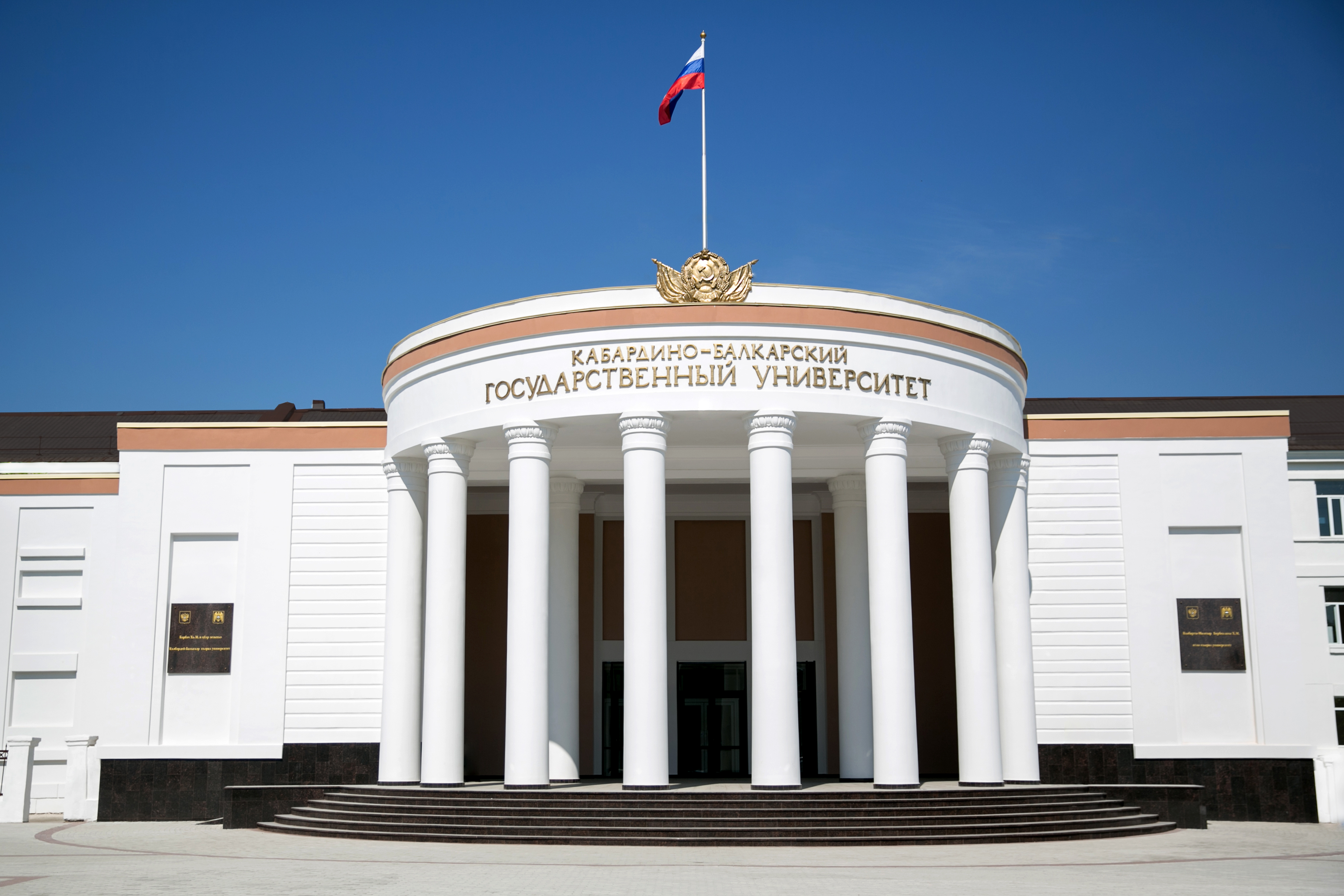
- Bochka Bar, Pobeda Cinema, Cathedral of Equal to the Apostle Mary Magdalene, Fountain at the Place de la Concorde in the Lenina Street, Monument to the Nalchans who died in the Great Patriotic War, Trees in a park, Snow in a memorial, Statue of Lenin, Central Mosque, KBSU Main Building

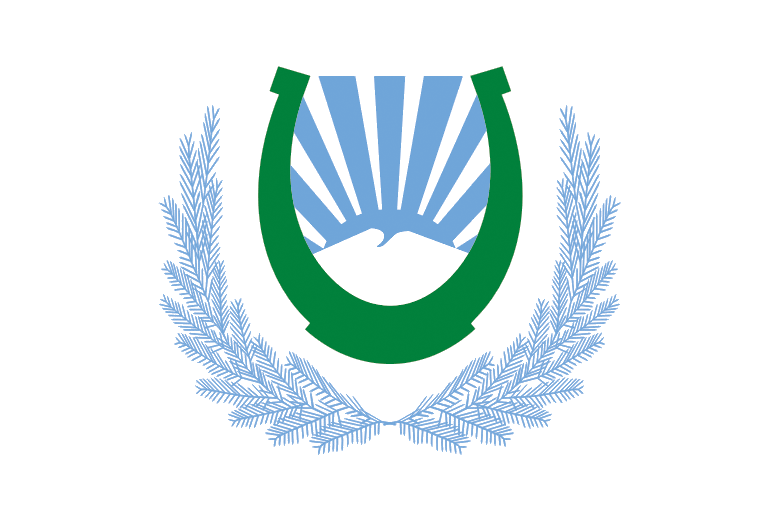
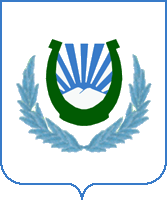
- Flag Coat of arms
- Interactive map of Nalchik
- Location of Nalchik Nalchik (European Russia) Nalchik (Russia) Nalchik (Europe)
- Coordinates: 43°29′N 43°37′E
- Country: Russia
- Federal subject: Kabardino-Balkaria
- Founded: 1724
- City status since: 1921

Government
  - Body: City Council
  - Head: Vacant

Area
  - Total: 67 km^{2} (26 sq mi)
- Elevation: 512 m (1,680 ft)

Population (2021 Census)
  - Total: 247,054
  - Estimate (2025): 245,588 (−0.6%)
  - Density: 3,700/km^{2} (9,600/sq mi)

Administrative status
  - Subordinated to: city of republic significance of Nalchik
  - Capital of: Kabardino-Balkar Republic
  - Capital of: city of republic significance of Nalchik

Municipal status
  - Urban okrug: Nalchik Urban Okrug
  - Capital of: Nalchik Urban Okrug
- Time zone: UTC+3 (MSK)
- Postal codes: 360000, 360005, 360032, 360901, 360903, 360904
- Dialing code: +7 8662
- OKTMO ID: 83701000001
- City Day: September 1
- Website: admnalchik.ru

Nalchik (Russian: Нальчик, IPA: [ˈnalʲtɕɪk]; Kabardian: НалщӀэч, romanized: Nalṣ̂ăčʼ [naːɮɕʼakʲ]; Karachay-Balkar: Нальчик or Налчыкъ, romanized: Nalçik or Nalçıq [naltʃɯk]) is the capital city of Kabardino-Balkaria, Russia, situated at an altitude of 550 meters (1,800 ft) in the foothills of the Caucasus Mountains; about 100 kilometers (62 mi) northwest of Beslan (Beslan is in the Republic of North Ossetia–Alania). It covers an area of 131 square kilometers (51 sq mi). Population: 247,054 (2021 census); 240,203 (2010 census); 274,974 (2002 census); 234,547 (1989 Soviet census).

Historical population
Year	Pop.	±%
1897	4,809	—
1926	12,893	+168.1%
1939	47,970	+272.1%
1959	87,617	+82.6%
1970	145,690	+66.3%
1979	207,406	+42.4%
1989	234,547	+13.1%
2002	274,974	+17.2%
2010	240,203	−12.6%
2021	247,054	+2.9%
Source: Census data

== History ==
The territory of modern-day Nalchik was formerly known as Sloboda. The modern city dates from the early 19th century when the expanding Russian Empire built a fort there in 1818.

In 1838, a Russian military settlement was founded in the city, and after the Russian Revolution of 1917, in the year 1921, Nalchik was given the status of administrative center of Kabardin Autonomous Oblast. During the Russian Empire, the settlement was the administrative capital of the Nalchiksky Okrug of the Terek Oblast.

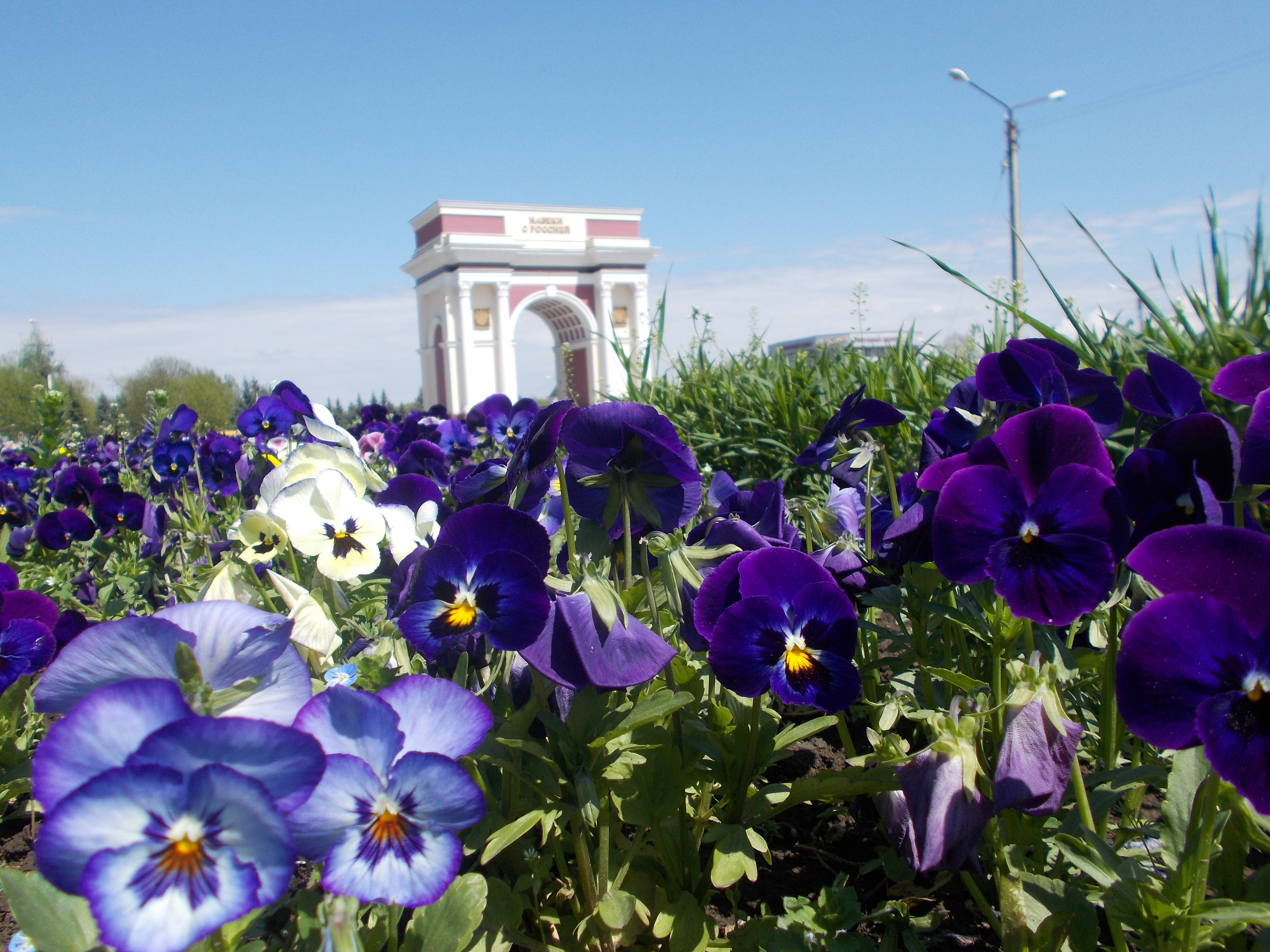
Nalchik Arc De Triumph

The word "Nalchik" literally means "small horseshoe" in Kabardian (or Circassian, a Northwest Caucasian language) and Karachay-Balkar (a Turkic language). It is a diminutive of na'l, a common Middle Eastern word (Arabic, Persian, Turkish) for "horseshoe", possibly from the ancient Scythian, 'nalak' (horseshoe). The city of Nalchik was named this way because of how it is shaped as surrounded by the mountains of the land, and the Nalchik River is named after the city it runs across.

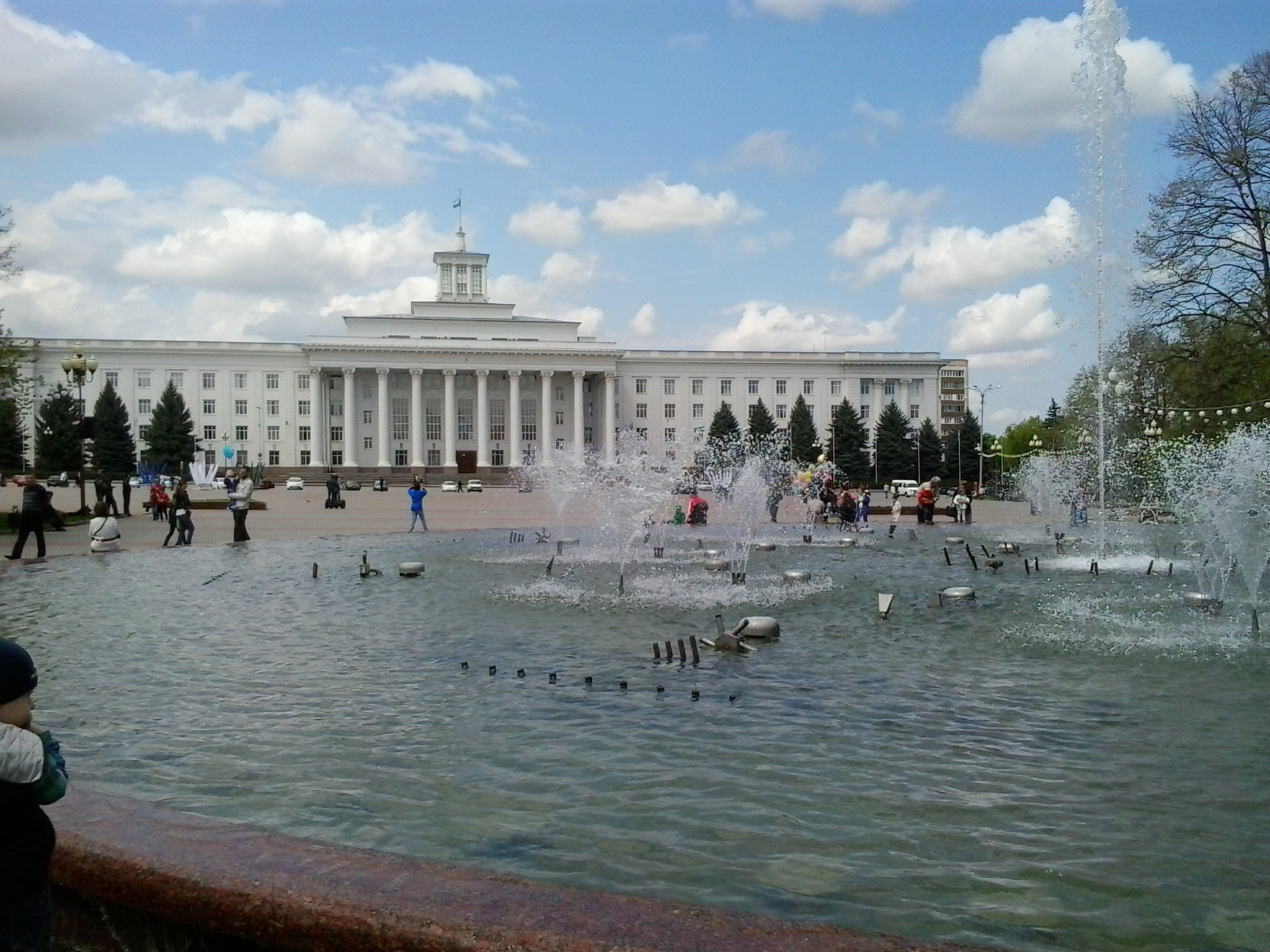
Concord Square

During World War II, on 2 November 1942, Nalchik was occupied by Romanian mountain troops (Vânători de munte) under the command of Brigadier General Ioan Dumitrache, its capture earning the Romanian General the Knight's Cross of the Iron Cross. The city was heavily damaged during the conflict. General Dumitrache went to great length ordering his troops to protect local population during the time Nalchik was occupied by Romanian forces. Professor A. N. Dainaco, the Mayor of Nalchik at that time, thanked General Dumitrache for liberating the city. Although he was accused of war crimes, General Dumitrache was fully exonerated after the war by a joint Soviet and Romanian judicial commission.

In 1990, there was a 6.0 magnitude earthquake in Nalchik.

With the collapse of the Soviet Union in 1991, Nalchik and the Kabardino- Balkaria region become a federal republic of Russia.

In 1999 the remains of Kazym Mechiyev, who died in exile in 1945, were reburied in Nalchik.

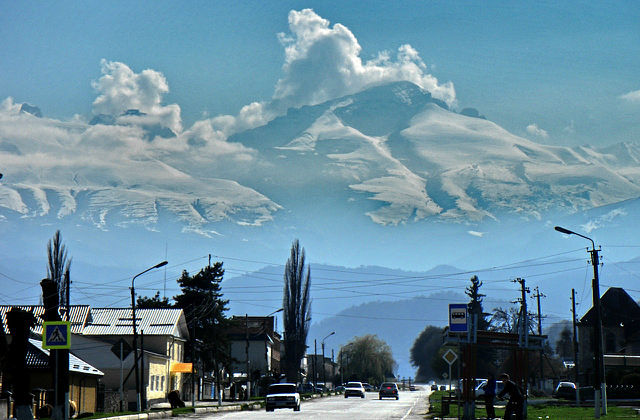
Street scene on the Nalchik Outskirts with a view of the mountain range

On October 13, 2005, Nalchik was attacked by a large group of Yarmuk Jamaat militants led by Shamil Basayev and Anzor Astemirov. Buildings associated with the Russian security forces were targeted, killing at least 14 civilians and wounding 115. Thirty-five policemen died in the fighting. Eighty-nine militants, including their leader Ilias Gorchkhanov, were killed, and another fifty-nine arrested.

== Administrative and municipal status ==
Within the framework of administrative divisions, it is, together with four rural localities, incorporated as the city of republic significance of Nalchik—an administrative unit with the status equal to that of the districts. As a municipal division, the city of republic significance of Nalchik is incorporated as Nalchik Urban Okrug.

== Ethnic groups ==
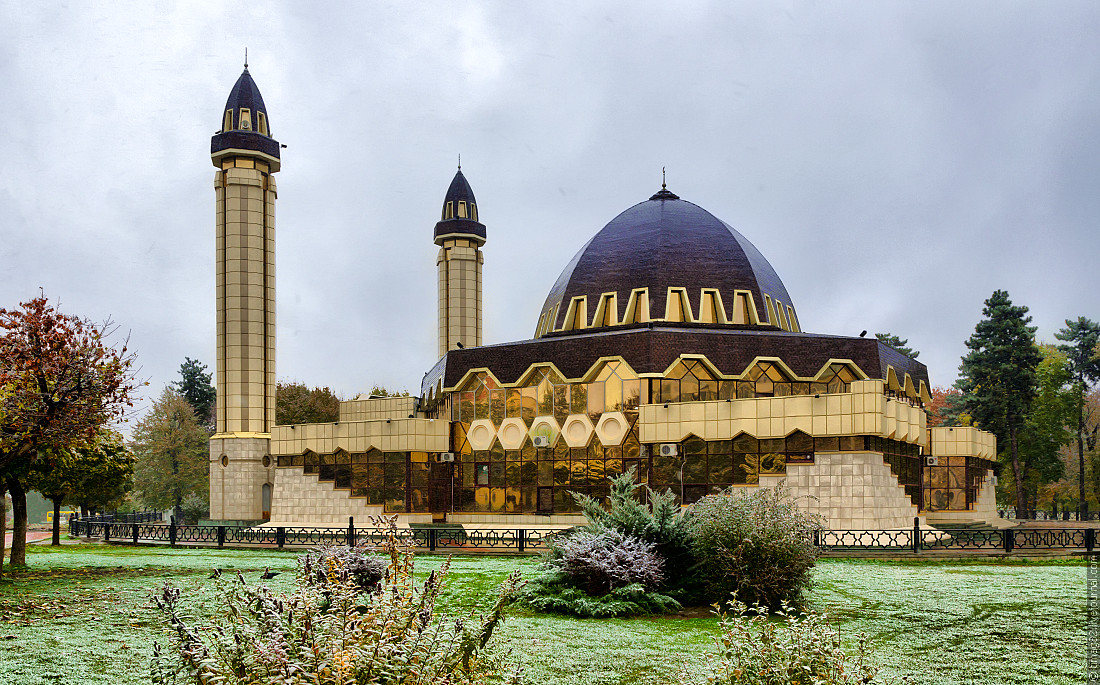
Central Mosque of Nalchik

The population of the city in 2021 included the following breakdown by ethnicity:

- Kabardians (Circassian) (52.8%)
- Russians (22.8%)
- Balkars (Taulu) (18.2%)
- Ossetians (1.3%)
- others (13.2%)

2002 census data is as follows:

- Kabardians (47.3%)
- Russians (31.8%)
- Balkars (11.4%)
- Ossetians (1.9%)
- Ukrainians (1.0%)

== Economy and education ==
Nalchik is a balneological and mountain climatotherapy resort, with several sanatoriums. It also serves as an industrial center of the republic (non-ferrous metallurgy, light industry, construction materials manufacturing, machine building).

Nalchik is home to the following facilities of higher education:

- Kabardino-Balkarian State University
- North Caucasian State Institute of Arts
- Kabardino-Balkarian State Agricultural Academy

== Climate ==
Nalchik has a hot-summer humid continental climate (Köppen climate classification: Dfa) with hot summers and no dry season. The warm season lasts from late May to mid-September and the cold season from December to March. Most forms of precipitation are light rain and thunderstorms, as well as light snow and moderate snow. Wind speeds are typically calm to a light breeze through the year.

Climate data for Nalchik (1991-2020)
Month	Jan	Feb	Mar	Apr	May	Jun	Jul	Aug	Sep	Oct	Nov	Dec	Year
Daily mean °C (°F)	−1.8 (28.8)	−1.1 (30.0)	4.1 (39.4)	10.3 (50.5)	15.9 (60.6)	20.3 (68.5)	23 (73)	22.5 (72.5)	17.5 (63.5)	11.1 (52.0)	4.1 (39.4)	−0.3 (31.5)	10.5 (50.8)
Average precipitation mm (inches)	21 (0.8)	22 (0.9)	39 (1.5)	58 (2.3)	94 (3.7)	107 (4.2)	69 (2.7)	58 (2.3)	63 (2.5)	45 (1.8)	34 (1.3)	27 (1.1)	637 (25.1)
Average precipitation days (≥ 1 mm)	6	6	8	8	11	10	8	7	7	7	7	6	91
Mean monthly sunshine hours	78	90	107	151	192	226	244	213	176	132	86	73	1,768
Source: Гидрометцентр России

Climate data for Nalchik (Нальчик)
Month	Jan	Feb	Mar	Apr	May	Jun	Jul	Aug	Sep	Oct	Nov	Dec	Year
Mean daily maximum °C (°F)	0.2 (32.4)	1.0 (33.8)	6.6 (43.9)	16.0 (60.8)	20.9 (69.6)	24.7 (76.5)	27.1 (80.8)	26.3 (79.3)	22.0 (71.6)	14.5 (58.1)	8.3 (46.9)	3.1 (37.6)	14.2 (57.6)
Mean daily minimum °C (°F)	−7.1 (19.2)	−6.0 (21.2)	−1.3 (29.7)	5.4 (41.7)	10.6 (51.1)	14.1 (57.4)	16.7 (62.1)	15.8 (60.4)	11.7 (53.1)	5.4 (41.7)	1.0 (33.8)	−3.7 (25.3)	5.2 (41.4)
Average precipitation mm (inches)	22 (0.9)	23 (0.9)	38 (1.5)	63 (2.5)	99 (3.9)	100 (3.9)	72 (2.8)	61 (2.4)	55 (2.2)	43 (1.7)	29 (1.1)	26 (1.0)	631 (24.8)
Average precipitation days	6	6	8	9	11	11	9	7	7	7	7	7	95
Average snowy days	9.5	6.67	5.42	0.58	0	0	0	0	0	0.85	3.46	7.92	34.4
Mean monthly sunshine hours	69	71	117	141	185	235	222	210	201	153	93	63	1,760
Source 1: Gydrometcenter
Source 2: City Hall of Nalchik, Meteomanz(snowy days 2012-2024)

== Sports ==
PFC Spartak Nalchik is an association football club based in Nalchik, playing in the Russian Premier League. The 2008 World Women's Chess Championship has also been held in Nalchik on August 28–September 18, 2008.

== Notable people ==
- Albert Tumenov- UFC Fighter
- Khadzhimurat Akkayev (born 1985), Olympic weightlifter
- Astemir Apanasov (born 1989), Circassian singer, musician, composer, and actor
- Rustam Bakov (born 1983), former Russian footballer
- Viktor Belenko (1947–2023), Soviet pilot who defected with a MiG-25, landing in Hakodate, Japan
- Dima Bilan (born 1981), singer
- Felix Frankl (1905–1961), Austrian and Soviet mathematician, physicist and aerodynamics
- Lyalya Chyornaya (1909–1982), actress
- Andre Geim (born 1958), Soviet, British and Netherlands physicist; Nobel laureate
- Vladislav Goldin (born 2001), basketball player, currently playing US college basketball at the University of Michigan
- Mark Ifraimov (born 1981), Israeli former member of the Knesset and Deputy Mayor of Sderot
- Muhadin Kishev (born 1938), Soviet and Spanish artist
- Andrei Kolkoutine (born 1957) painter
- Alim Kouliev (born 1959), actor, theater director
- Azamat Kuliev (born 1963), painter
- Eldar Kuliev (1951–2017), film director, screenwriter
- Katya Lel (born 1974), singer
- Alexander Litvinenko (1962–2006), ex-FSB officer turned anti-Putin activist, poisoned with polonium-210 and died 2006.
- Leo Mol (1915–2009), Soviet and Canadian artist and sculptor
- Nikolay Pavlov (born 1987), professional footballer
- Albert Sarkisyan (born 1975), former Armenian professional footballer
- Yuri Temirkanov (1938–2023), orchestra conductor
- Mikhail Zalikhanov (born 1939), academician of Russian Academy of Sciences

== Twin towns and sister cities ==
- Amman, Jordan
- Kayseri, Turkey
- Vladikavkaz, Russia
- Reno, Nevada, United States

== See also ==
- History of the Jews in Nalchik
