= Azamat Kuliev =

Russian painter

- Born: March 1, 1963 (age 63); Nalchik, KBASSR, USSR
- Known for: Painting

Azamat Kaisynovich Kuliev (born March 1, 1963) is a Russian artist of Balkar origin. Kuliev was born in Nalchik, the capital of Kabardino-Balkaria, to the Balkar poet Kaisyn Kuliev and his Ingush wife Maka. His elder brother, Alim Kouliev, is a Russian-American actor living and working in Hollywood. His oldest brother, Eldar Kuliev, is a Russian film director and screenwriter. The member of the Union of Arts of Russia. Kuliev has been affected by his father's surroundings of artistic masters and has started to paint since his childhood. Azamat Kouliev as a student was studying artistic schools of all periods patiently and hard. His work was deeply influenced by one of the greatest painters of all time Leonardo da Vinci and other Italian Renaissance painters. The Balkarian folklore theme and poetry of his father also have a reflection in Kouliev's paintings.

== Biography ==
After graduating from middle school in Nalchik where he was learning basic skills of art he moved to Leningrad and became a student of The State Academic Art School from which he graduated successfully in 1983. Since that, he has been working at The Art Foundation in Nalchik. After serving in the Soviet Army in 1986 Kuliev returned to Leningrad and studied at the Repin St. Petersburg State Academic Institute of Painting, Sculpture and Architecture, formally known and subordinated within the Russian Academy of Arts, under direction of Andrei Mylnikov, ( Russian: Мыльников, Андрей Андреевич ), an acclaimed Russian artist, Vice-President of Russian Academy of Arts, and graduated in 1996.

Since 1998 the artist is living and working in Turkey.

== Exhibitions ==
Personal exhibitions

- 1997 – Memorial Museum of Kaisyn Kuliev
- 1997 – Kabardino-Balkaria Foundation of Culture, Nalchik, Russia
- 1999 – Aysel Gozubuyuk Sanatevi, Ankara, Turkey
- 2001 – Galeri Selvin, Istanbul, Turkey
- 2001 – Aysel Gozubuyuk Sanatevi, Ankara, Turkey
- 2005 – Galeri Selvin, Ankara, Turkey
- 2007 – Galeri Baraz, Istanbul, Turkey
- 2007 - Memorial Museum of Kaisyn Kuliev
- 2013 – Gallery Bonart, Istanbul, Turkey
- 2014 – Gallery Lombardi, Rome, Italy Curator: Giorgio Bertozzi, Ferdan Yusufi.
- 2016 – Stilllife Art Gallery, Ankara, Turkey
- 2018 - Arda Art Gallery, Ankara, Turkey

Others

- 1997-2002 – Turksav Turk Dunyasi, Ankara, Turkey
- 1998 – Region Exhibition Russian South, Krasnodar, Russia
- 1998 – Arts ve Crasts (Fair), Ankara, Turkey
- 1999 – Arts ve Crasts (Fair), Ankara, Turkey
- 1999 – Gallery Nefertiti, Ankara, Turkey
- 2000 – Museum of Arts, Nalchik, Russia
- 2001 – Museum of Arts, Nalchik, Russia
- 2002 – Ankart (Fair), Ankara, Turkey
- 2002 – Artistanbul (Fair), Istanbul, Turkey
- 2005 – Atatürk Kultur Merkezi, Istanbul, Turkey
- 2007 - Museum of Arts, Nalchik, Russia
- 2008 – Art show (Fair), Istanbul, Turkey
- 2011 –1. International Art Symposium, Gazi University, Ankara, Turkey
- 2012 – Infinity Has No Accent, Berlin, Germany, Project: Halil Altındere, Curator: René Block/Barbara Heinrich, Tanas Gallery
- 2013 – ON6 Young Artist Group and Teachers, Aysel Gozubuyuk Sanatevi, Ankara, Turkey
- 2013 – Ironias Turcas, CA2M Centro de Arte Dos de Mayo, Madrid, Spain Project: Halil Altındere
- 2013 –Together, Vista Gallery, Rome, Italy
- 2013 – A La Salida L’arte rende omaggio ad Alida Valli e Giancarlo Zagni, Gabriel Zagni, Vista Gallery, Rome, Italy Curator: Giorgio Bertozzi, Daniele Goretti, Ferdan Yusufi
- 2013 – Mom I am Barbarian!, Doruk Art Gallery, Istanbul, Turkey
- 2013 – Immagina Arte In Fiera Reggio Emilia, Neo Art Gallery, Reggio Emilia, Italy
- 2014 – Artexpo (Fair), New York City, United States
- 2015 – Artexpo (Fair), New York City, United States
- 2015 – Le Dame Art Gallery, USEUM, London, United Kingdom
- 2016 – ‘Day Dreams’, Summart Gallery, Istanbul, Turkey
- 2016 – ‘İmge Beden’, Summart Gallery, Istanbul, Turkey
- 2016 – II. Artankara Çağdaş Sanat Fuarı, Stilllife Art Gallery, Ankara, Turkey
- 2016 – EuroExpoArt Vernice Art Fair, Forlì, Italy
- 2016 – İstanbul Interior Architect Fair, Stilllife Art Gallery, Istanbul, Turkey
