= Muhadin Kishev =

- Kabardian: КIыщ Мухьэдин
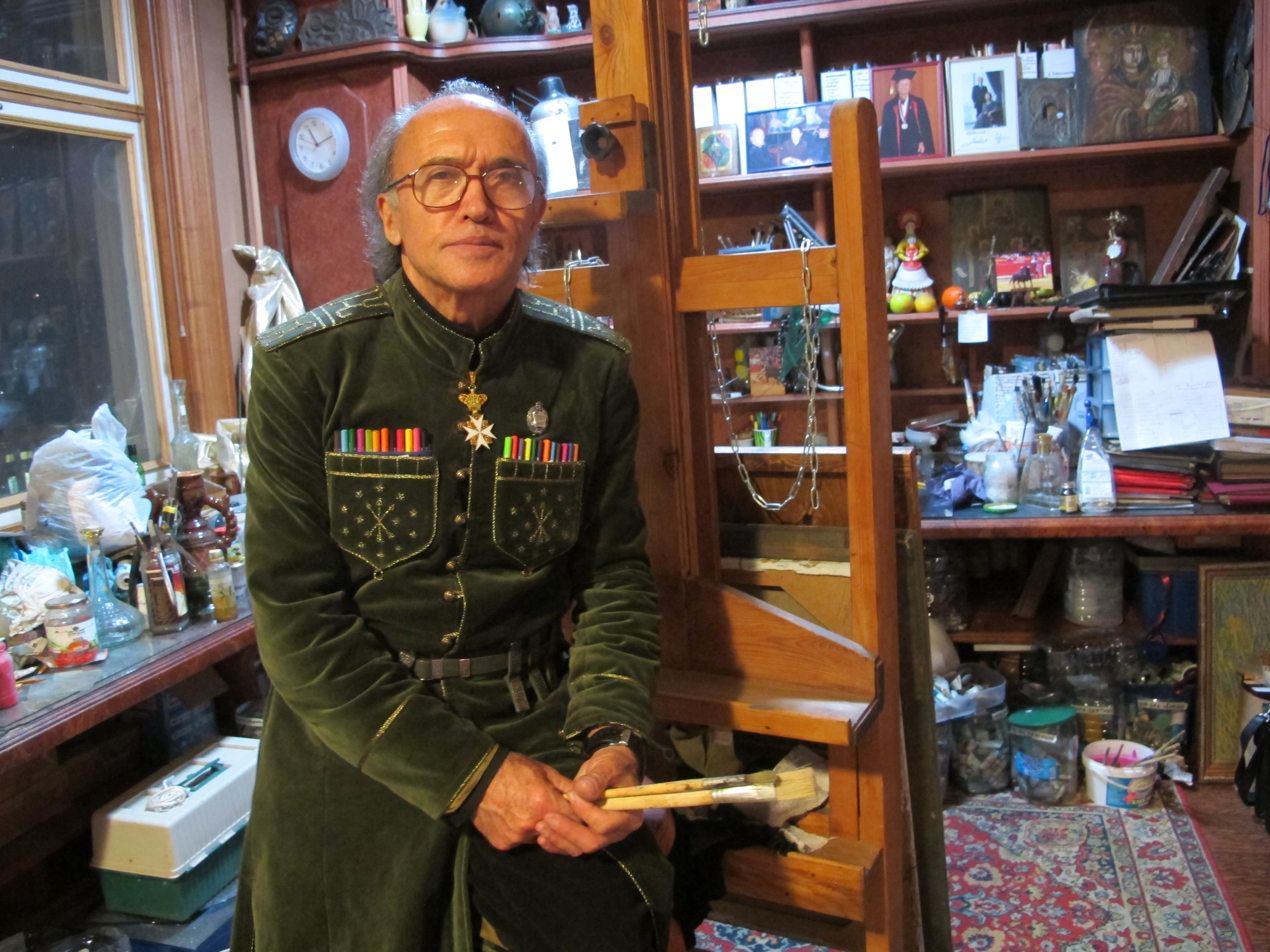
- Born: Muhadin Ismailovich Kishev; 1939; Soviet Union, Chegem II, Kabardino-Balkaria, USSR
- Education: Krasnodar State University, Faculty of Graphic Art
- Known for: Painting, Monumental Arts
- Awards: Honoured Artist (Meritorious Artist) of the Russian Federation, People's Artist of the Republic of Kabardino-Balkaria, Full member of the Russian Academy of Arts
- Website: www.muhadinkishev.com

Muhadin Ismailovich Kishev (Kabardian: КIыщ Мухьэдин, Russian: Мухадин Исмаилович Кишев; born 1939) is a Circassian artist from Kabardino-Balkaria in the North Caucasus. His art is concerned with the confirmation of beauty and the medium of his paintings is usually oil on canvas or monotype on paper, with colour as the protagonist of his art. Kishev has exhibited his work in many countries apart from Russia including England, Spain and the United States. Currently he lives in Spain and divides his time between his Studios in Moscow, Nalchik and Los Canyos de Meca in Andalusia.

== Early life ==
Kishev was born in 1939 in the village of Chegem II, near Nalchik, the capital of Kabardino-Balkaria in the Caucasus, in the former Soviet Union. His father, Ismail Hazhretovich Kishev perished in the Battle of Stalingrad in 1943. His mother Marusya Isufovna Kisheva, brought him up alone in the difficult post-war years and supported him in his dream of becoming an artist. His first exhibition was of literary portraits (Dostoevsky, Gogol and others) and took place in the school library at the age of eleven organised by the librarian Zoya Elgarova. At the age of thirteen he joined the Art Club run by Andrei Lukich Tkachenko in the House of Pioneers in Nalchik and every Sunday walked the fourteen kilometres from his home to the capital. This prepared him to study at the State University of Krasnodar from which he graduated with a First Class Diploma in Graphic Arts. At the same time Kishev was awarded the medal for acrobatic aviation at the Enem Aviation Club in Krasnodar, so completing his Military service.

== Career ==
In 1973 Kishev was admitted to the Union of Artists and during the first 20 years of his artistic career worked in the Monumental Arts completing projects in murals, mosaics, bas-relief and inlaid wood in the towns of Zheleznovodsk, Anapa, Pyatigorsk, Rostov and others. Among these were many State assignments from the Ministry of Health of the USSR. He made several professional trips to Poland, Germany, Italy, Nepal and to India. Between 1988-91 he was chosen to act as mentor to the young, most promising artists of the USSR in the Artists’ Residences of Goryachi Kliuch on the Black Sea and Baikal in Siberia making use of the more relaxed atmosphere during Perestroika to encourage them to paint with greater freedom; and so he founded a generation of talented artists who now exhibit their work all over the world. In 1993 he was admitted to the International Union of Artists and in 1994 was invited to spend four years in London at Chisenhale Studios. He travelled to Gambia, Senegal, Scotland, Belgium and France and in 1997 was elected member of the Association of Russian artists in London. During his career of more than 50 years he has taken part in some 80 group exhibitions and over 40 solo exhibitions. Since 1998 he has been living and working in Spain, in his Studio in Los Caños de Meca in the Province of Cadiz.

== Art ==
Kishev primarily works with oil on canvas and monotype on paper. His paintings are organized into several thematic series, including Destines, Cosmic Space, Homeland, Voice of the Artist, and Nostalgia for Nature. His work frequently addresses the relationship between realism and abstraction, incorporating cultural influences from both Eastern and Western traditions, as well as his residence in Spain.

== Exhibitions ==
Since his early twenties right up to the present day Kishev's work has been shown in over 40 solo exhibitions and taken part in many more collective ones. His paintings have been exhibited in important museums in Russia such as the Moscow Museum of Modern Art, Moscow: "The Power of Colour". The Moscow Museum of Modern Art, and the Kabardino-Balkarian Museum of Fine Arts, Nalchik: Jubilee exhibition celebrating 20 years of work in art and 60th anniversary of Soviet Education, The Kabardino-Balkarian Museum of Fine Arts, Nalchik, the State Museum of the Peoples of Orient, Maikop, Adygeya, in the Russian Academy of Arts, Moscow: "Window on Europe" and in galleries and exhibition centres:. His work has been seen not only in Soviet Russia and the present day Russian Federation, but also in cultural centres in London: "Andalusia in the eyes of Muhadin Kishev". Instituto Cervantes, London", The Russian Centre for Culture, Pushkin House, London and in Spain: "Muhadin Kishev en Andalucía"., "The Circle, triangle, square and point in abstract art". "Spaces". Sala Joan Miró, Palace of Congresses, Madrid, "Around the Circle". Malaga University, Spain and "From the Caucasus to Andalusia"- three simultaneous exhibitions sponsored by The University of Cadiz, the Foundation of Culture and the Benot Gallery, Cadiz, Spain.

== Museums and private collections ==
Kishev's paintings are to be found in Moscow in the Moscow Museum of Modern Art, the Tretyakov State Gallery, the Foundation of the Ministry of Culture of the Russian Federation, Art Fund of the Russian Federation and the Gorbachev Foundation. The Kabardino-Balkarian Museum of Fine Arts in Nalchik has a large collection of his works from the Soviet period and so many other museums in Russia: Krasnodar, Tobolsk, Maikop, Mahachkala, Narzan and others. His work is also in the collection of the "Ateneo" in Madrid and the Kolodzei Art Foundation, the Kolodzei Collection of Russian and Eastern European Art, USA. Over 300 of his paintings are in private collections in Russia, Great Britain, Spain, Germany, Iceland, Poland, Finland, France, the United States, Latin America, Brazil, Japan, Australia, New Zealand, Africa, the former Republics of the USSR and other countries of the world.

== Awards ==
- Honoured Artist of the Russian Federation.
- People's Artist of the Republic of Kabardino-Balkaria.
- Full member of the Russian Academy of Arts.
- Academician of the International Adyghe (Circassian) Academy of Sciences (IAAS), KBR.
- During Soviet times he was awarded the Medal for "Valiant Labour" on the 100th anniversary of the birth of Lenin.
- Laureate prize of Lenin Komsomol, Kabardino-Balkaria.
- Order of Malta, Zaragoza, Spain.
- Academician & Comendador de las Palmas Académicas of the International Academy of Science, Technology & Humanities. Valencia.
- Member of the European Academy of Arts in Belgium.
- Gold medals are also among his accolades.
- In 2008 he was awarded the Gold Medal "300th Anniversary of the victory over the Crimean Tartars" for the painting "The Battle of Kanzhal". Republic of Kabardino-Balkaria (see illustration).
- From the Russian Academy of Arts he has the Gold Medal of the, for his exhibition "The Power of Colour", Moscow Museum of Modern Art.
- "Shuvalov" Gold Medal from the Russian Academy of Arts, for his exhibition "A Hymn to Beauty" at the Russian Academy of Arts.
- Gold Medal of "Outstanding Merit" from the Russian Academy of Arts for his Jubilee exhibition "A Hymn to Beauty" at the Central House of Artists, Moscow (2015).

== Selected works ==
- Holiday Concert in Kabardino-Balkaria. 1967. 90x180. Wood-marquetry. The Kabardino-Balkarian Museum of Fine Arts, Nalchik.
- Underwater Fairy Tale. 1970. 9х20м. Mosaic. Swimming pool in the Presidential Sanatorium «Dubovaya Roscha», Zheleznovodsk.
- Collectivization. 1983. 95x130. Oil on canvas. The Kabardino-Balkarian Museum of Fine Arts, Nalchik.
- The End. 2002. 80x100 cm. Oil on canvas. The Moscow Museum of Modern Art.
- The Dark Dawn. 2002. 100x80 cm. Oil on canvas. Artist's archive.

Andalusian Abundance. 2007. Oil on canvas

- Happiness. 2003. 114x146 cm. Oil on canvas. Kolodzei Collection of Russian and Eastern European Art, Kolodzei Art Foundation. USA.
- Series: The Blood-stained Windows of Beslan. 3 September 2004. Acrylic on paper. Muzei Pamyati (Музей Памяти). Beslan.
- You cannot Kill the Soul: The Jewish Tragedy. 2005. 100x200 cm. Acrylic on canvas. Artist's archive.
- Andalusian Abundance. 2007. 130x195. Oil on canvas. Artist's archive (see illustration).
- Two Paths. 2007. 130x195 cm. Oil on canvas. Artist's archive.
- The Battle of Kanzhal. 2008. 140x280 cm. Oil on canvas. Artist's archive.
