= Vera Zvyagintseva =

Russian actress and poet

Vera Klavdievna Zvjaginceva or Zvyagintseva (Russian: Вера Клавдиевна Звягинцева; 1894-1972) was a Russian actress, poet, translator and memoirist. She translated poetry from Armenian to Russian including the poetry of Gevorg Emin, and that of Rachiya Ovanesyan.

== Life ==
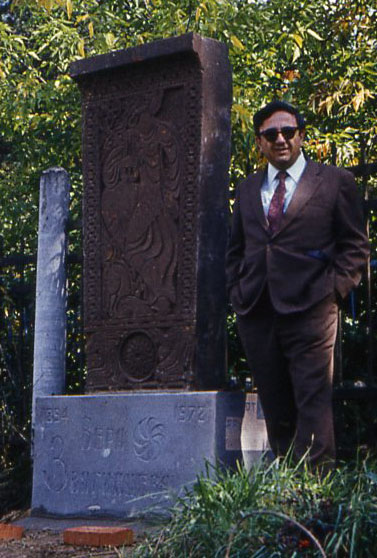
Levon Mkrtchyan at tombstone of Vera Zvyagintseva

Zvyagintseva was friends with many artists and writers, including Marina Tsvetaeva, Sophia Parnok, and Boris Pasternak. She met Tsvetaeva in Moscow in summer 1919.

In summer 1933 Zvyagintseva was ill with acute colitis and dysentery. Sophia Parnok, herself in the last year of her life, wrote to her lover about Zvyagintseva:

I feel very sad not to be taking care of her when she's so unwell! She was so good and sympathetic to me when I was sick [...] She always has such awful and prolonged illnesses that I get very frightened for her when she gets sick. If she passed away, it would be a big blow to me – I would lose a poet who is close to me and a friend to whom i have confided my amorous woes. She is our friend, mine and yours. Think of her with love and hope that she lives!

== Works ==
- Na mostu: stikhotvorenii︠a︡. Moscow, 1922.
- Poėzii︠a︡ sovetskoĭ Armenii : sbornik. Moscow: Gos. izd-vo khudozh. lit-ry, 1947.
- Narty: kabardinskiĭ epos. Moscow, 1957.
- Ispovedʹ. Stikhi. Moscow: Sovetskiĭ Pisatelʹ, 1967.
- Izbrannye stikhi. Moscow, 1968.
