= Bella Akhmadulina =

Soviet-Russian poet, short story writer, and translator (1937-2010)

- Белла Ахмадулина
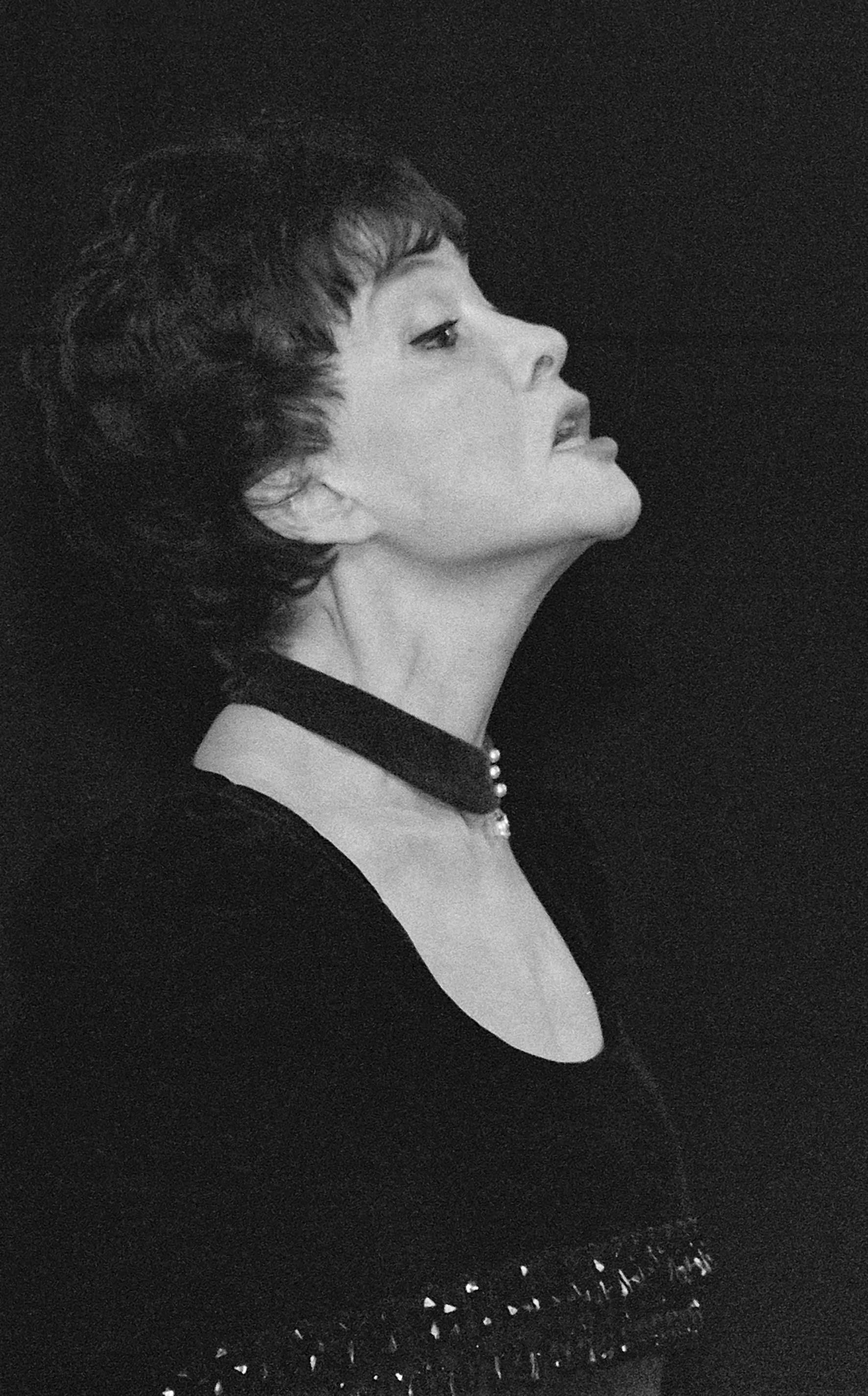
- Born: Izabella Akhatovna Akhmadulina; 10 April 1937; Moscow, Soviet Union
- Died: 29 November 2010 (aged 73); Peredelkino, Russia
- Education: Maxim Gorky Literature Institute
- Occupations: Poet, writer, translator
- Spouses: Yevgeny Yevtushenko (m. 1954, divorced) Yuri Nagibin (m. 1960, divorced) Eldar Kuliev (m. 1971, divorced) Boris Messerer (m. 1974)
- Children: Elizaveta Kulieva, poet
- Writing career
- Period: 1955–2010
- Notable works: The String, Fever, Music Lessons, The Candle (poetry collections)
- Movements: Neo-Acmeism, the Sixtiers, Russian New Wave

Izabella Akhatovna Akhmadulina (Russian: Бе́лла (Изабе́лла) Аха́товна Ахмаду́лина, Tatar: Белла Әхәт кызы Әхмәдуллина; 10 April 1937 – 29 November 2010) was a Soviet and Russian poet, short story writer, and translator, known for her apolitical writing stance. She was part of the Russian New Wave literary movement. She was cited by Joseph Brodsky as the best living poet in the Russian language. She is known in Russia as "the voice of the epoch".

Despite the aforementioned apolitical stance of her writing, Akhmadulina was often critical of authorities in the Soviet Union, and spoke out in favour of others, including Soviet Nobel laureates Boris Pasternak, Andrei Sakharov, and Aleksandr Solzhenitsyn. She was known to international audiences via her travels abroad during the Khrushchev Thaw, during which she made appearances in sold-out stadiums. Upon her death in 2010 at the age of 73, President of Russia Dmitry Medvedev hailed her poetry as a "classic of Russian literature."

The New York Times said Akhmadulina was "always recognized as one of the Soviet Union's literary treasures and a classic poet in the long line extending from Lermontov and Pushkin." Sonia I. Ketchian, writing in The Poetic Craft of Bella Akhmadulina, called her "one of the great poets of the 20th century. There's Akhmatova, Tsvetaeva, Mandelstam, and Pasternak – and she's the fifth".

== Early life, education and works ==
Bella Akhmadulina was born in Moscow on 10 April 1937, the only child of Akhat Valeevich Akhmadulin, a Tatar father and Nadezhda Makarovna Lazareva, a Russian-Italian mother. They underwent evacuation to Kazan when World War II broke out.

Akhmadulina's literary career began when she was a school-girl working as a journalist at the Moscow newspaper, Metrostroevets, and improving her poetic skills at a circle organized by the poet Yevgeny Vinokurov. Her first poems appeared in the magazine October after being approved by established Soviet poets. These first poems were published in 1955. Émigré critic Marc Slonim described her prospects as follows in 1964 (Soviet Russian Literature): "Her voice has such a purity of tone, such richness of timbre, such individuality of diction, that if her growth continues she will be able some day to succeed Akhmatova" as "the greatest living woman poet in Russia". After graduating, Akhmadulina travelled throughout Central Asia. Her travels sparked her interest in “Asiatic blood”, a theme which recurred in her later work.

After finishing school, Akhmadulina entered the Maxim Gorky Literature Institute from which she graduated in 1960. While studying at the institute, she published her poems and articles in different newspapers, both official and handwritten. She was the subject of criticism in Komsomolskaya Pravda in 1957. She was expelled in 1959 (but allowed re-entry as time progressed) as a result of her opposition to the persecution of Boris Pasternak. In 1962 the first collection of her poems, titled Struna (The String), was published and was a resounding success. In spite of being expunged, many of her collections of verses were published later: Music lessons (1970), Poems (1975), Candle (1977), Dreams of Georgia (1977), The Mystery (1983), Coastline (1991), and others. A collection called Sad (Garden) led to Akhmadulina receiving the USSR State Prize in 1989.

Akhmadulina attended “poetic evenings at the Polytechnic Museum” and the Luzhniki Stadium concerts, both major cultural events of the time.

"Many dogs and one dog", a short story written in a surreal style, was published in 1979 in Samizdat's Metropol Almanac. She assisted in the creation of Metropol. She wrote essays about Alexander Pushkin and Mikhail Lermontov.

She appeared in sold-out stadiums in the 1960s, as did the poets Yevgeny Yevtushenko, Andrei Voznesensky and Robert Rozhdestvensky.

Her open letter was published supporting the exiled Andrei Sakharov. In October 1993, she signed the Letter of Forty-Two.

She was a journalist in a 1964 film.

Bella participated in many international poetry events including Kuala Lumpur International Poetry Reading (1988).

After the Soviet Union she published Casket and Key (1994), A Guiding Sound (1995) and One Day in December (1996).

Akhmadulina emphasised a challenging balance between creative freedom and state conformity, quoted as describing the Soviet Union as a “Garden of Eden for poetry and a purgatory for poets.”

=== Translations ===
The main themes of Akhmadulina's works are friendship, love, and relations between people. She wrote numerous essays about Russian poets and translators, some devoted to her close friend, Bulat Okudzhava. Akhmadulina avoided writing overtly political poems, but took part in political events in her youth, supporting the so-called "dissident movement". She translated Russian poetry from France, Italy, Chechnya, Poland, Yugoslavia, Hungary, Bulgaria, Georgia, Armenia, and many others.

Akhmadulina wrote in a "resolutely apolitical" style. She made use of imagery and humour in her work. She used rhymed quatrains in her early works, which discussed ordinary, yet imaginative occurrences from daily life in language that was full of both archaisms and neologisms. Religion and philosophy became her themes as she aged and she wrote in longer forms. In her later works, Akhmadulina often wrote about illness, insomnia, alienation, and impending death. F.D. Reeve compared Akhmadulina to Alexander Pushkin, saying that she “cloaked her spirit with his”.

== Personal life ==
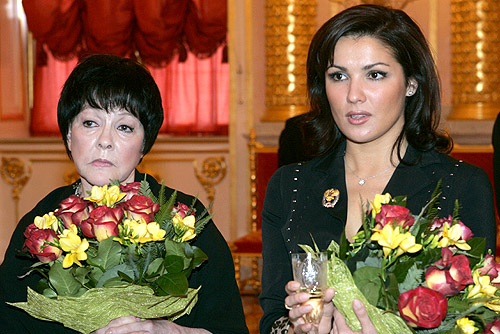
Bella Akhmadulina and Anna Netrebko at the Russian State Prize ceremony at the Kremlin

Bella's first marriage in 1954 was to Yevgeny Yevtushenko, another famous poet of the era; her second husband, whom she married in 1960, was Yuri Nagibin, a major novelist and screenwriter. Her third marriage in 1971 to film director Eldar Kuliev produced a daughter, Elizaveta Kulieva, who is also a poet. In 1974, she married her last husband, the famous artist and stage designer Boris Messerer. They had homes in Peredelkino and Moscow. They were married from 1974 to her death in 2010. Akhmadulina spoke of having a "guiding light" and believing that "something or someone looks after us”.

== Death ==
Akhmadulina died at her home in Peredelkino near Moscow on 29 November 2010 at the age of 73. Akhmadulina's husband said her death was from a heart condition, describing it as a "cardiovascular crisis". Dmitry Medvedev and Vladimir Putin both paid tribute, with Medvedev writing on his blog that the death was an "irreparable loss". Medevdev also wrote that Akhmadulina's poetry was a "classic of Russian literature". Akhmadulina was buried in Novodevichy Cemetery in Moscow, memorialised by a grave monument.

== Filmography ==
=== Cameo ===
- I Am Twenty (1961), directed by Marlen Khutsiev

=== Screenwriter ===
- Clean Ponds (1965), based on the works of Yuri Nagibin
- Stewardess (1967)

== Bibliography ==
- Struna (The String), Moscow, 1962
- Oznob (Fever), Frankfurt, 1968
- Uroki Muzyki (Music Lessons), 1969
- Stikhi (Verses), 1975
- Svecha (The Candle), 1977
- Sny o Gruzii (Dreams of Georgia), 1978–79
- Metell (Snow-Storm), 1977
- Taina (The Secret), 1983
- Sad (The Garden), 1987
- Stikhotvorenie (A Poem), 1988
- Izbrannoye (Selected Verse), 1988
- Stikhi (Verses), 1988
- Poberezhye (The Coast), 1991
- Larets i Kliutch (Casket and Key), 1994
- Gryada Kamnei (The Ridge of Stone), 1995
- Samye Moi Stikhi (My Own Verses), 1995
- Zvuk Ukazuyushchiy (A Guiding Sound), 1995
- Odnazhdy v Dekabre (One Day in December), 1996

== Awards and tribute ==
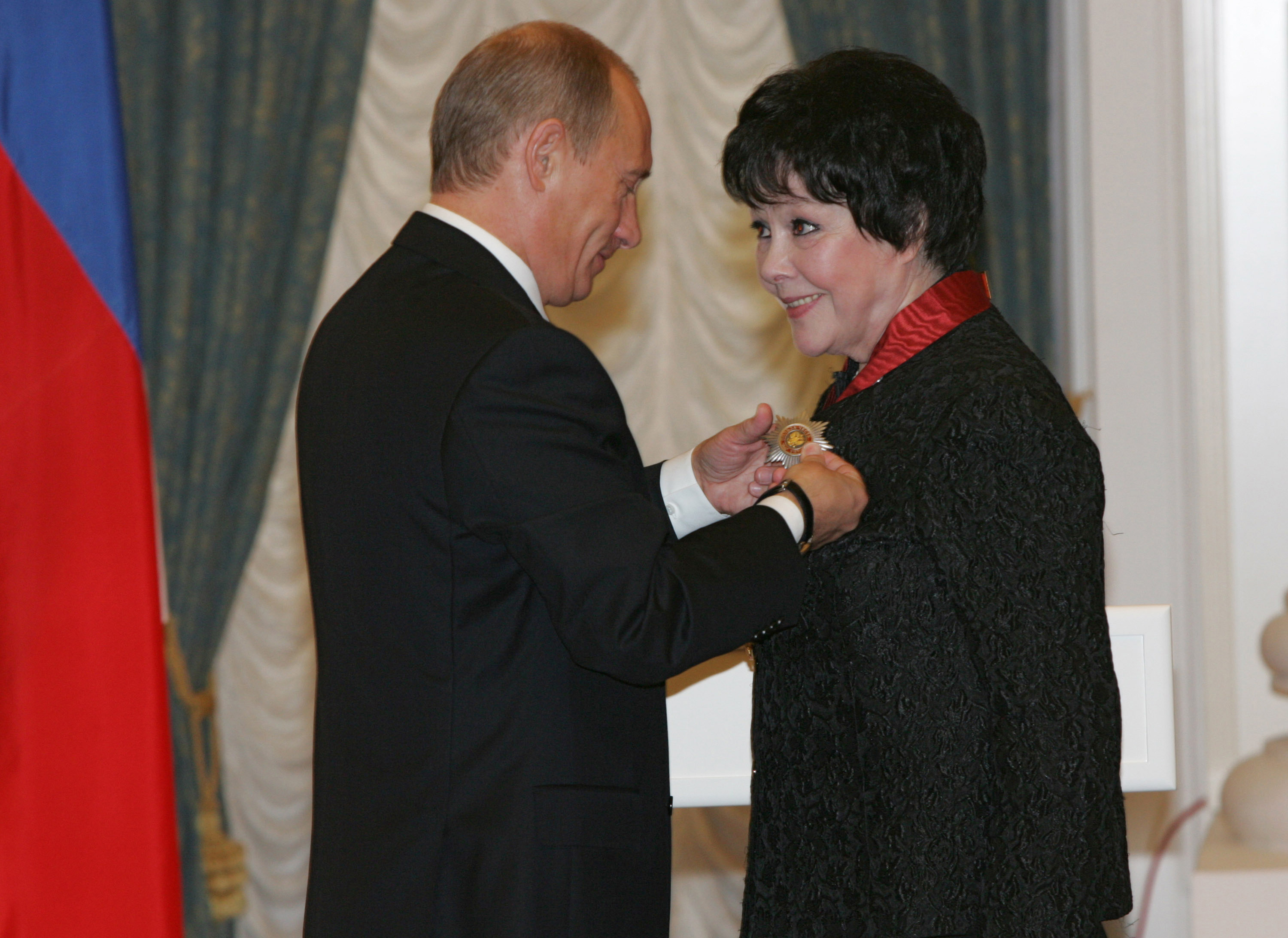
Russian President Vladimir Putin awarded of the Order "For Merit to the Fatherland", 2nd class, 9 October 2007

In 1977, Bella Akhmadulina became an Honorary Member of the American Academy of Arts and Letters (see AAAL website).

- USSR State Prize Laureate (1989)
- State Prize of the Russian Federation (2004)
- Order of Friendship of Peoples (1984)
- Order of Merit for the Fatherland, 2nd class (11 August 2007) – for outstanding contribution to the development of national literature and many years of creative activity; 3rd class (7 April 1997) – for services to the State and outstanding contribution to the development of national literature
- Laureate of the Foundation "Banner" (1993)
- Winner of the "Nosside" (Italy, 1994)
- Laureate of "Triumph" (1994)
- Pushkin Prize winner (1994)
- Laureate of the President of the Russian Federation in the field of Literature and Art (1998)
- Winner of "Brianza" (Italy, 1998)
- Winner of the journal "Friendship of Peoples" (2000)
- Prize winner Bulat Okudzhava (2003)
- Honorary Member of Russian Academy of Arts
- On 10 April 2017, Google Doodle commemorated her 80th birthday.
