= Vagif Guliyev =

Azerbaijani mathematician

Vagif Guliyev Vaqif Sabir oğlu Quliyev
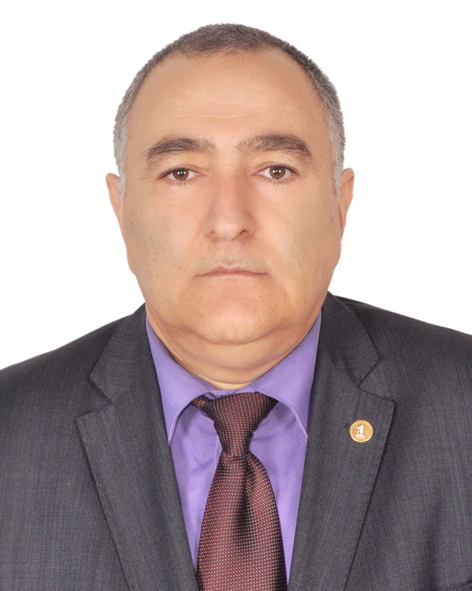
- Born: February 22, 1957 (age 69); Salyan, Azerbaijan SSR USSR
- Occupation: Mathematician

Prof. Vagif Guliyev (Azerbaijani: Vaqif Sabir oğlu Quliyev) is an Azerbaijani mathematician. He was born in the Salyan district of the Azerbaijan Republic, USSR. He earned a Doctor of Sciences Degree from Steklov Institute of Mathematics, Moscow in 1994. He has written three books and more than 100 published articles. He is a full professor at Baku State University.

== Research area ==
His research interests are:

- Potential type operators on Lie groups or homogeneous spaces
- Singular integral operators on Lie groups or homogeneous spaces
- Function spaces on Lie groups or homogeneous spaces
- Banach-valued function spaces of fractional smoothness
- Integral operators on strictly pseudoconvex domains in C_{n}
- Function spaces on strictly pseudoconvex domains in C_{n}
- Solvability and other properties of invariant partial differential equations on Lie groups
- Singular integrals, maximal functions, and other integral operators, generated by Bessel differential operators
- Bessel harmonic analysis and applications
