= Halil Altındere =

Turkish artist

- Born: 1971 (age 54–55)
- Occupation: Contemporary Artist
- Notable work: Wonderland

Halil Altındere (born in 1971 in Mardin, lives in Istanbul) is a contemporary artist. His work includes video, sculpture, photography, installation, performance, as well as collaborative editorial and curatorial projects.

The themes of his work mix traditional with the modern, Western with Eastern. His works point explore issues within contemporary societies and issues that cross social debates. His later work explores the everyday life and the humorous codes of subcultures in Istanbul.

His work has been showcased in major international exhibitions including Documenta 12 (2007), Manifesta 4 (2002), Kwangju Biennial (2002), Sao Paulo Biennial (1998), Istanbul Biennial (1997). One of his most ambitious solo exhibition was held at CA2M in Madrid, curated by Ferran Barenblit.
