= Alim Kouliev =

American actor

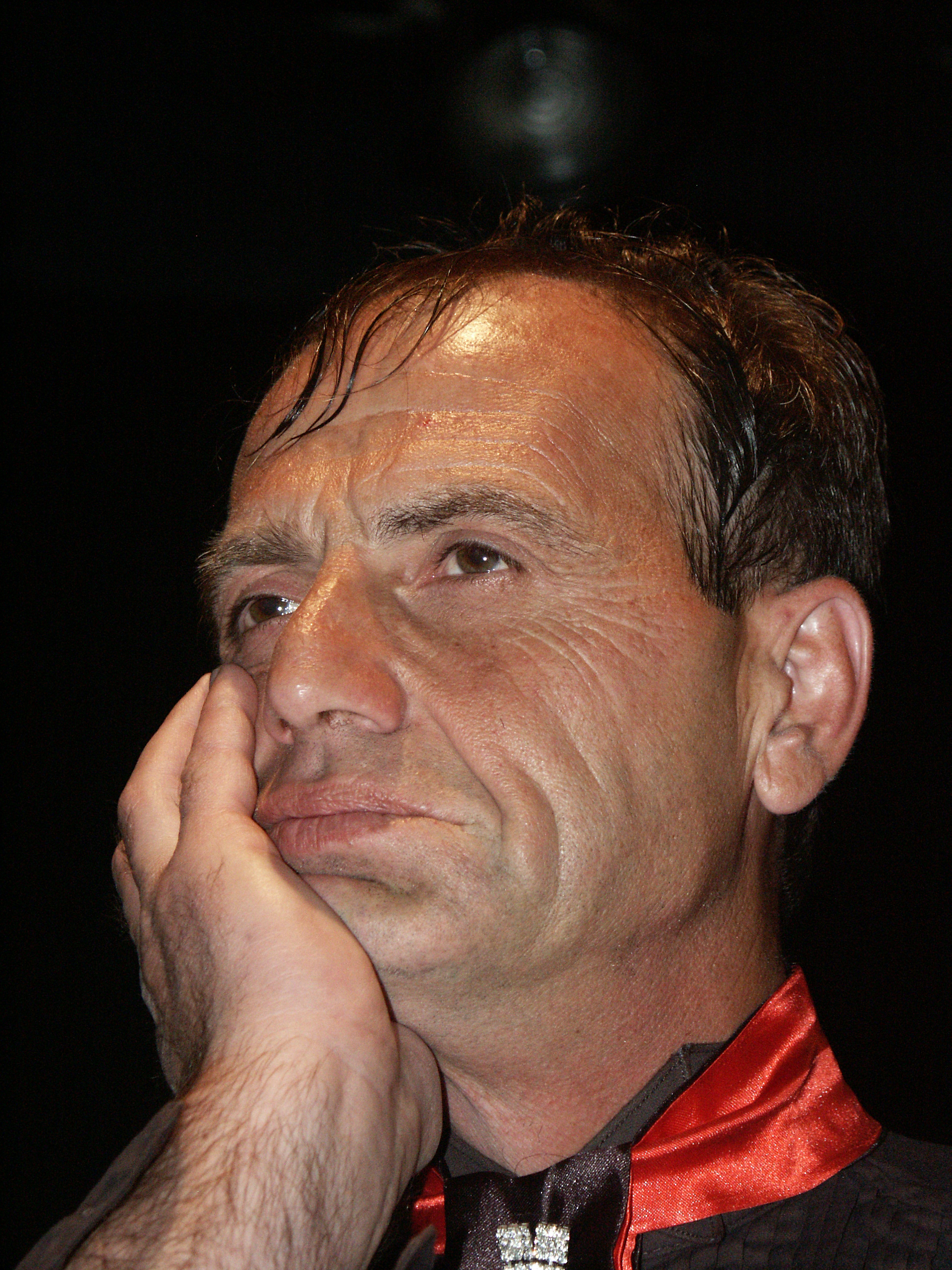
- Master and Margarita. Rehearsal
- Born: June 24, 1959 (age 67); Nalchik, Kabardino-Balkar ASSR, USSR
- Occupations: Stage actor, film actor, theater director
- Years active: 1976 - present
- Relatives: Kaisyn Kuliev (father); Maka Kulieva (mother); Eldar Kuliev (brother); Azamat Kuliev (brother)

Alim Kaisynovich Kouliev (born June 24, 1959) is a Soviet-born American actor, theatre director, and screenwriter of Balkar origin. Kouliev was born in Nalchik — a small city in USSR. His father was a Balkar poet Kaisyn Kuliev and his mother was his Ingush wife Maka. His elder brother Eldar Kuliev was a Russian film director and a screenwriter. His younger brother Azamat Kuliev is a Russian painter, living and working in Istanbul, Turkey. At the age of seven, Kouliev was influenced by Vladimir Visotsky, an acclaimed Russian actor, poet, and singer, and one of his father's younger colleagues in the poetry field. Alim later decided to become an actor.

== Biography ==
He studied acting at the Russian Academy of Theatre Arts (GITIS) in Moscow. After serving in the Soviet Army, he was studying stage directing in GITIS, and continued his education at the All-Union State Institute of Cinematography (VGIK) in Moscow, where he graduated from the acting class of Yevgeny Matveyev, an acclaimed master of theater and cinema. His classmate was Natalya Vavilova.

Ever since he was a student, Kouliev appeared on the professional stage. His first significant role on stage was Mercutio in Shakespeare's Romeo and Juliet at Aleksandr Demidov Theater-Studio, where he also played Atavio in The Moods of Marianne by Alfred de Musset and Meleander in Maurice Maeterlinck's Aglavain and Selyzett. He broke into films starring as Joseph Codrero in Copper Angel with Leonid Kuravlyov, Anatoly Kuznetsov, Aleksandr Filippenko, Leonid Yarmolnik. He has twelve years of acting experience working in leading Moscow theaters and has had several roles in the famous Russian feature films. Kouliev created many great characters in classic and contemporary productions, under the best Russian theatrical directors.

In 1991, his life changed dramatically; he moved to the United States.

After a long break in his career as an actor, Kouliev made his comeback. In Los Angeles, he became a key member of the theatrical troupe Dreamhouse Ensemble, where he played Sasha Smirnoff in Room Service and Uncle Tobit in Jimmy Christ. In 2009, the producer-actor-director presented his "master project", his own stage adaptation of Mikhail Bulgakov’s novel The Master and Margarita. Alim Kouliev performs extensively as an actor in the Hollywood film industry, on stage, and on TV.

== Filmography ==
Year	Film	Role	Notes
1978	Immured in glass (Zamurovannye v stekle)		Film
1984	Copper Angel	Jose Codrero	Film
1986	Jaguar	Cadet	Film
1988	All Costs Paid	Urka	TV Film
1988	The Story of One Billiard-Room	Mustached Man	Film
2001	The Secret KGB Paranormal Files	Egyptian consulate courier	TV Documentary
2005	War of the Worlds	Ferry Passenger	Film
2006	The Prestige	Theatre Patron	Film
2008	David & Fatima	Ishmael Aziz (Dubbing, Russian Language)	Film
2008	Standard Operating Procedure	Interrogator	TV Documentary
2008	The Curious Case of Benjamin Button	Cossack	Film
2009	Taxi Dance	Dmitry	Film
2010	Medal of Honor	Chechen Fighter	Video game
2012	I Love Your Moves	Kolya	Video
2012	A Glimpse Inside the Mind of Charles Swan III	Russian Cabbie	Film
2014	The November Man		Film
2015	Bridge of Spies	Russian General	Film
2015	Oleander	Victor	TV Series.
2015	The Secret Space Disaster	Mission Director	TV Mini-Sieries.
2016	The Americans	Investigating Magistrate	TV Series.
2018	El Freeman	Yuri	Film
2018	The Spy Who Dumped Me	Russian Thug	Film
2018	Unlovable	Konrad	Film
2019	Conan	Andy Richter lipsynk	Voice
2019	Call of Duty; Modern War Fare	Voice	Video Game
2020	Fakov in Amerika	Jailbird	Film
2020	Time to Wake Up Sleeping Beauty	Sergei	TV Film
2021	For All Mankind	Soviet Diplomat	TV series
2022	Grand Crew	Oleg	TV series
2022	Karaganda	Dima	Film

== Stage ==
Woland

=== Acting ===
Year	Title	Role	Notes
1977	..And Tomorrow Is The Fight	Sashka	Moscow Young Generation Theater, play
1977	Stop Malakhov	Hooligan	Moscow Young Generation Theater, play
1978	Mozart and Salieri	Mozart	Russian Academy of Theatre Arts, play
1981	Romeo and Juliet	Mercutio	Aleksandr Demidov Theater-Studio, play
1982	Aglovenn And Sellezet	Melleander	Aleksandr Demidov Theater-Studio, play
1982	She Without Love And Death	Captain	Aleksandr Demidov Theater-Studio, play
1982	Squareness Of Circle	Abram	Aleksandr Demidov Theater-Studio, play by Valentin Kataev
1983	Three Musketeers	Athos	Aleksandr Demidov Theater-Studio, play
1983	The Moods of Marianne	Ottavio	Aleksandr Demidov Theater-Studio, play
1983	Madame Bovary	Charles Bovary	Gerasimov Institute of Cinematography, play
1983	The Cabal of Hypocrites	Bouton	Gerasimov Institute of Cinematography, play
1984	The Devil's Disciple	Richard	Gerasimov Institute of Cinematography, play
1984	The Lower Depths	The Baron	Gerasimov Institute of Cinematography, play
1984	I Want To Be An Actor	Pashka	Moscow Theatre “Ermitazh” (Moscovsky Teatr Miniature), play
1985	Brandenburg Gates	Sergeant	Moscow Theatre “Ermitazh” (Moscovsky Teatr Miniature), play
2003	Room Service	Sasha Smirnoff	The Dreamhouse Ensemble Theater, Hollywood, play
2004	Jimmy Christ	Uncle Tobit	The Dreamhouse Ensemble Theater, Hollywood, play
2008	Master and Margarita	Woland	Master Project Production, Hollywood, play
2018	Till Death Do Us Part	Man	Russian Masters Theatre Projects Production, Hollywood, play based on "Open Couple" by Dario Fo and Franca Rame.
2020	Wake Up Sleeping Beauty	Sergei	Los Angeles County Department of Mental Health, play

=== Directing ===
Year	Title	Notes
2008	Master and Margarita	Master Project Production, Hollywood, play. Producer
2018	Till Death Do Us Part	Russian Masters Theatre Projects Production, Hollywood, based on "Open Couple" by Dario Fo and Franca Rame play. Producer
