= Zahra Guliyeva =

Azerbaijani musician (born 1951)

Zahra Guliyeva Zəhra Quliyeva
- Born: September 23, 1951 (age 73); Baku, Azerbaijan SSR, USSR
- Occupation: violinist
- Education: Azerbaijan State Conservatoire; Leningrad Conservatory
- Awards: Honored Artist of the Republic of Azerbaijan

Zahra Teymur gizi Guliyeva (Azerbaijani: Zəhra Teymur qızı Quliyeva, born September 23, 1951) is a violinist, concertmaster, professor of Baku Music Academy, People's Artist of the Republic of Azerbaijan.

== Biography ==
Guliyeva was born on September 23, 1951, in Baku. She studied at the Secondary Music School named after Bulbul in 1959–1970. After entering the Hajibeyov Azerbaijan State Conservatoire in 1970, she studied in the classes of Sarvar Ganiyev and M. Taghiyev and graduated in 1975 with honors. In 1976-1978, Zahra Guliyeva continued her education in the class of Boris Gutnikov in the assistant-internship department of the Leningrad Conservatory.

== Career ==
While studying at the Azerbaijan State Conservatory, Zahra Guliyeva performed a concert of Azerbaijani composers in Rostov. While at the Leningrad State Conservatory, she performed in a number of concert halls and performed works by Azerbaijani and Western composers. She began her pedagogical activity in 1978 at the Azerbaijan State Conservatory. From that year to 1993, she worked as a teacher at the "String instruments" department.

Zahra Guliyeva created the "Elegance" author's program on Azerbaijan State Television between 1983-1990. She talked about the art, life, and work of both Azerbaijani and world-famous artists and musicians. In 1990, Zahra Guliyeva was appointed First Deputy Chairman of the Union of Music Figures of Azerbaijan. During these years, she went on a number of concert tours participated in the Aberdeen and NE Scotland Music Festival.

In 1993, at the invitation of Bilkent University in Turkey, Zahra Guliyeva began working there. She was a member of the international orchestra operating at the university. Zahra Guliyeva went there in 1998 at the invitation of the Governor of Macao (now a private administrative region of the People's Republic of China) and worked as a concertmaster of the Chamber Orchestra. She also continued her pedagogical activity at the Macao Conservatory, during which time she continued her active performance and gave numerous solo and orchestral concerts in various cities of China, as well as in Portugal and Spain.

Zahra Guliyeva, who returned to Azerbaijan in 2001, is currently performing and teaching. At the violin department of the Baku Music Academy, in addition to the performance class, she also delivers lectures to students on the subject of "History of the violin art".

Z. Guliyeva has repeatedly performed in Azerbaijan, Turkey, Germany, Portugal, Italy, Bulgaria, the United States and a number of European cities, as well as held creative evenings. She is the author of first textbook "History of Violin Art" in the Azerbaijani language, methodical aids and textbooks on cello performance.

== Awards ==
- People's Artist of the Republic of Azerbaijan — September 17, 2008
- Honored Artist of the Republic of Azerbaijan — May 17, 1991
- Presidential pension — September 19, 2016
