= Rustam Bakov =

Russian footballer

Personal information
- Full name: Rustam Ayvarovich Bakov
- Date of birth: 11 May 1983 (age 43)
- Place of birth: Nalchik, Russian SFSR
- Height: 1.75 m (5 ft 9 in)
- Position: Midfielder

Youth career
- 1989–1998: DYuSSh-31 Nalchik
- 1999–2000: FC Nika Moscow

Senior career*
| Years | Team | Apps | (Gls) |
| 2001 | FC Titan Reutov | 6 | (0) |
| 2002 | FC Lokomotiv Moscow | 0 | (0) |
| 2003 | PFC Spartak Nalchik | 4 | (0) |
| 2004–2005 | FC Mashuk-KMV Pyatigorsk | 13 | (0) |
| 2006 | FC Dynamo Stavropol | 8 | (0) |
| 2008 | FC Malka | | |
| 2010 | FC Kolos Blagodarny | | |
| 2010 | FC Dynamo-Neftyanik Neftekumsk | | |
| 2011–2012 | FC Karelia-Discovery Petrozavodsk (amateur) | | |
| 2013 | FC Istra (amateur) | | |
| 2013–2014 | FC Kolomna | 21 | (1) |
| 2015 | FC Kakhun | | |
- * Club domestic league appearances and goals

Rustam Ayvarovich Bakov (Russian: Рустам Айварович Баков; born 11 May 1983) is a former Russian football midfielder.

== Club career ==
He played in the Russian Football National League for PFC Spartak Nalchik in 2003.
