= Eldar Kuliev =

Russian film director (1951–2017)

- Born: 31 December 1951; Frunze, Kyrgyz Soviet Socialist Republic, USSR
- Died: 14 January 2017 (aged 65); Moscow, Russia
- Occupations: Film director, screenwriter
- Spouse(s): Bella Akhmadulina; Olga Kulieva
- Children: Elizaveta Kulieva
- Relatives: Kaisyn Kuliev (father); Maka Kulieva (mother); Alim Kouliev (brother); Azamat Kuliev (brother)

Eldar Kaisynovich Kuliev (31 December 1951 – 14 January 2017) was a Russian Soviet film director and screenwriter. He was born in Frunze to Kaisyn Kuliev, an acclaimed Balkar poet and Maka, his Ingush wife, during the deportation of the Balkars to Kyrgyzstan and Kazakhstan. His younger brother Alim Kouliev is a Russian-American actor living and working in Hollywood. His youngest brother Azamat Kuliev is a Russian painter living and working in Istanbul, Turkey.

== Career ==
Kuliev graduated from directing class of Aleksandr Zguridy at the All-Union State Institute of Cinematography (VGIK) in Moscow. He was married to a Russian poet Bella Akhmadulina. From that marriage they have a daughter Elizaveta Kulieva, a Russian poet. He is a writer of original script for the TV miniseries The Wounded Stones, named after his father's poetry book and developed at Dovzhenko Film Studios (USSR) in 1987. Soviet authorities considered Kuliev's creative work, notably his novel The Farewell Look, to be contrary to the "general line" of the existing political regime, and his works were placed under a publication ban in the USSR.

Although the Soviet Union collapsed in 1991, Kuliev could not continue his career as a result of a car accident and a subsequent serious illness. Kuliev died in his apartment in Moscow on 14 January 2017.
