= Almaty 2 railway station =

Train station in Kazakhstan

Almaty 2 Алматы 2
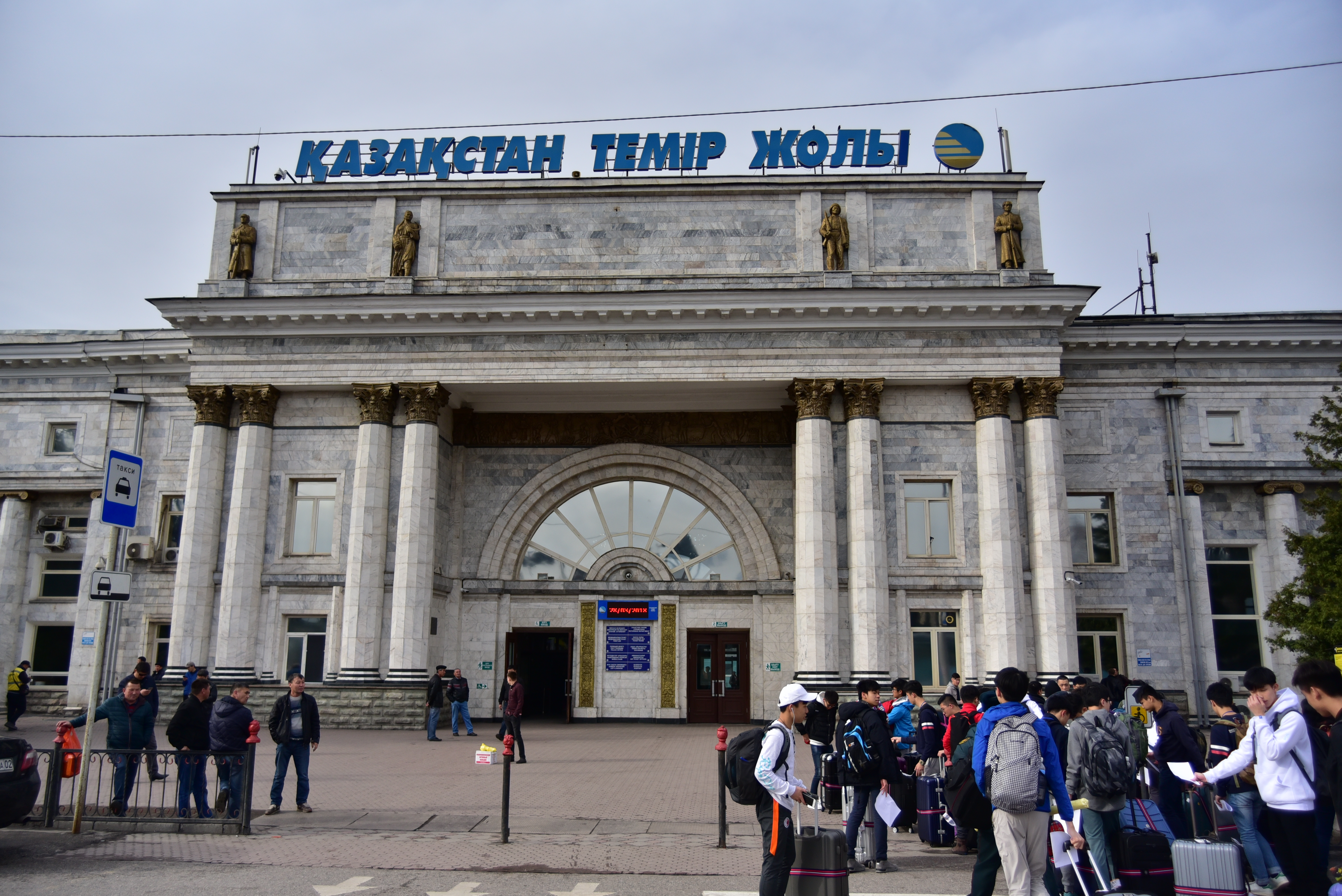

General information
- Location: Almaty; Kazakhstan
- Coordinates: 43.2737°N 76.9391°E
- System: Kazakhstan Temir Zholy
- Owner: Kazakhstan Temir Zholy
- Platforms: 8
- Tracks: 9

Construction
- Parking: Yes

Other information
- Station code: 700100

History
- Opened: 1939
- Rebuilt: 1977

Services
Preceding station	KTJ	Following station
Almaty-1 towards Novosibirsk, Russia	Turkestan–Siberia Railway	Reverses direction
Medeu towards Arys I	Turkestan–Siberia Railway	Reverses direction
Roshcha towards Otar	Almaty elektrichka	Terminus
Roshcha towards Qosqodyk	Almaty elektrichka	Terminus
Location

The Almaty 2 or Almaty-2 (Kazakh: Алматы 2) is one of the oldest railway stations located in Almaty, Kazakhstan. The station serves an average daily footfall of approximately 5,000 passengers, which increases to around 10,000 during the summer months due to heightened travel demand.

The Almaty 2 functions as a major transportation hub, facilitating departures and arrivals in all directions. It is particularly vital for international rail connections, primarily to Russian cities such as Moscow and Saint Petersburg, as well as to Ürümqi in China.

Domestically, the station serves key cities across Kazakhstan, including Astana (the capital), Shymkent, Petropavl, Atyrau, Jezkazgan, Mangystau (Mangyshlak), and Oral.

== History ==
During the initial years of constructing the railway station, the site was located on the Turksib Krasnogvardeysky tract, on the grounds of a former furniture factory. However, following a proposal by the engineer Mukhamedzhan Tynyshpaev, the project was relocated to Starokladbischenskaya Street (now Abylai Khan Avenue), the site of an old cemetery. The cemetery was cleared, making way for a station square, which later became a hub for tram and trolleybus services. This redevelopment marked the beginning of a new avenue in Almaty.

The railway station square holds its own distinct history. In 1954, a monument to Abai Qunanbaiuly was installed, followed by a monument to Mikhail Kalinin in 1972, which was removed in 1992 following Kazakhstan's independence. In 2000, an equestrian sculpture monument to Abylai Khan was erected and remains a prominent feature of the square. Surrounding the square, residential and public buildings were constructed, enhancing the area’s urban landscape.

Until 1941, the railway station and its facilities were built according to a standard design. During the early years of World War II, the east side of the station building was completed. The building’s façade featured semi-circular projections with large window panes at the entrance. A notable sculptural composition, created by Czech sculptor Bogomil Vahek—exiled to Almaty during Joseph Stalin’s regime—adorned the station. The figures symbolized success, industry, agriculture, and the Soviet Union. Tragically, many of the architects, engineers, and designers involved in the station’s construction were repressed and executed during the Great Purge.

In 1977, the station underwent extensive reconstruction, including the addition of a west wing. These renovations addressed technological issues and modernized the building’s interior and exterior design. The station continues to serve as a significant landmark and a reflection of Almaty’s evolving history.

== Trains and destinations ==
=== Long distance ===
Train number	Train name	Destination	Operated by
001/002		(Uzbekistan) Tashkent	Kazakhstan Temir Joly
003/004		(Kazakhstan) Astana	Kazakhstan Temir Joly
007/008	Kazakhstan	(Russia) Saratov	Kazakhstan Temir Joly
008/009		(Kazakhstan) Astana	Kazakhstan Temir Joly
010/011		(Kazakhstan) Shymkent	Kazakhstan Temir Joly
015/016	Jetisu	(Kazakhstan) Petropavl	Kazakhstan Temir Joly
025/026	Aq Sunqar	(Kazakhstan) Shymkent	Kazakhstan Temir Joly
027/028		(Kazakhstan) Oral	Kazakhstan Temir Joly
031/032		(Kazakhstan) Pavlodar	Kazakhstan Temir Joly
041/042		(Kazakhstan) Atyrau	Kazakhstan Temir Joly
073/074		(Kazakhstan) Jezkazgan	Kazakhstan Temir Joly
077/078		(Kazakhstan) Mangystau	Kazakhstan Temir Joly
087/088		(Kazakhstan) Saryagash	Kazakhstan Temir Joly
101/102		(Kazakhstan) Astana	Kazakhstan Temir Joly
105/106		(Kazakhstan) Petropavl	Kazakhstan Temir Joly
113/114		(Russia) (Tatarstan) Kazan	Kazakhstan Temir Joly
207/208		(Kazakhstan) Astana	Kazakhstan Temir Joly
301/302		(Russia) Novosibirsk	Kazakhstan Temir Joly
337/338		(Kazakhstan) Dostyk	Kazakhstan Temir Joly
351/352		(Kazakhstan) Oskemen	Kazakhstan Temir Joly
541/542		(Kazakhstan) Atyrau	Kazakhstan Temir Joly
847/848		(Kazakhstan) Uzynagash	Kazakhstan Temir Joly

=== Suburban destinations ===
Suburban commuter train (elektrichka) connects Almaty 2 with the towns of Boralday, Aqsengir, Chemolgan, Shyngyldy and Uzynagash.

== Gallery ==
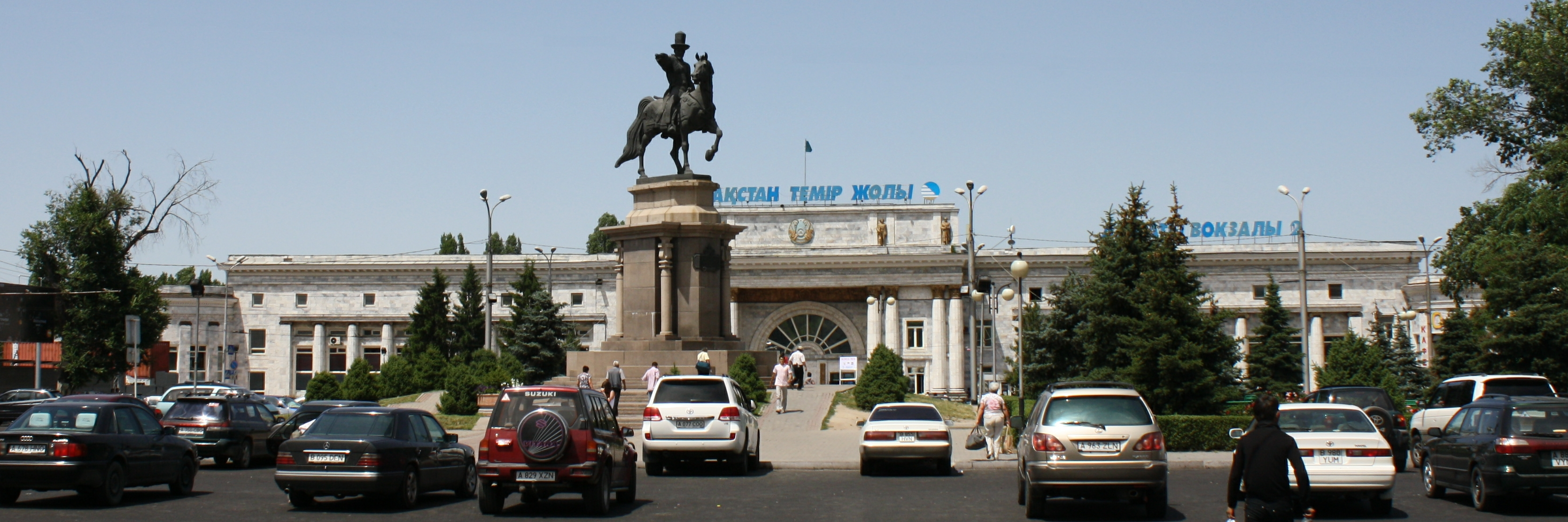

== See also ==
- Almaty-1
- Mukhamedzhan Tynyshpaev
