= 1740 in Russia =

Events from the year 1740 in Russia

== Incumbents ==
- Monarch – Anna (until 28 October [O.S. 17]), Ivan VI (from 28 October [O.S. 17])
- Regent – Ernst Johann von Biron (28 October [O.S. 17] – 20 November [O.S. 9]), Sovereign and Grand Duchess Anna Leopoldovna (since 20 November)

== Events ==
- January - The Ice House was built in St. Petersburg.
- 28 October - 2-months old Prince Ivan Antonovich succeeds Empress Anna of Russia as Ivan VI under the regency of Anna's favourite Ernst von Biron.
- 20 November - Biron was arrested by the guards led by Burkhard Christoph von Münnich
- The rulers of the northeast of the Middle Zhuz, including Ablai Khan, concluded an agreement on the Russian protectorate over the Middle Zhuz.

== Births ==
- 29 February - Thomas MacKenzie, admiral, founder of Sevastopol.
- 7 May - Nikolai Arkharov, Governor General of Moscow (1781–1784)
- 28 May - Fedot Shubin, architect
- 23 August [O.S. 12 August] 1740 - Ivan VI, Emperor of Russia in 1740–41. (d. 1764)
- 21 September [O.S. 10 September] 1740 - Ivan Lepyokhin, Russian naturalist, zoologist, botanist and explorer. (d. 1802)

== Deaths ==
- 8 July - Artemy Volynsky, Pyotr Yeropkin and Andrey Khrushchyov, statesmen (executed)
- 28 October - Anna, empress of Russia (born 1693)
