= Raz'yezd Sem'desyat =

Raz'yezd Sem'desyat Aksengir
- Village
- Location in Kazakhstan
- Coordinates: 43°21′0″N 76°49′0″E
- Country: Kazakhstan
- Region: Almaty Region
- Time zone: UTC+6 (Omsk Time)

Aksengir (Kazakh: Ақсеңгір, Aqseñgır), previously Raz'yezd Sem'desyat, is a village in Almaty Region of south-eastern Kazakhstan. The village lies on the road from Boralday to Ushkonyr.
