= Longest train services =

This article lists the longest passenger rail services that are currently scheduled and running directly between two cities. This list is not complete due to the complexity of various railway systems, their timetables and difference in schedule administration between countries. To keep the list simple, only services that are point-to-point direct between two cities are listed. Services that require railcar exchanges, coach changes, shunting or station transfers are not listed.

== Top 50 train services, by distance ==
No.	Origin (country)	Destination (country)	Train name No.	Operator name	Distance (km)	No. of stops	Frequency	Scheduled running time	Ref.
1	Moscow (Russia)	Vladivostok (Russia)	Rossiya 1 / 2	Russian Railways	9,300	140	Daily	164 hrs (~7 days)	
2	Moscow (Russia)	Vladivostok (Russia)	9 / 10	Russian Railways	9,259	81	Daily	147 hrs (~6 days)	
3	Kislovodsk (Russia)	Neryungri (Russia)	97 (additional carriage)	Russian Railways	7,963	122	Every other day	150 hrs (~6 days)	
4	Chita (Russia)	Adler (Russia)	269 / 270	Russian Railways	7,504	95	3 times a week (in Summer)	140 hrs (~6 days)	
5	Chita (Russia)	Anapa (Russia)	69 (additional carriage)	Russian Railways	7,070	109	Daily	135 hrs (~5.5 days)	
6	Moscow (Russia)	Neryungri (Russia)	82 (additional carriage) / 375 (additional carriage)	Russian Railways	6,950	101	Every other day	124 hrs (~5 days)	
7	Adler (Russia)	Severobaykalsk (Russia)	273 / 274	Russian Railways	6,883	91	Weekly (in Summer)	125 hrs (~5 days)	
8	Moscow (Russia)	Chita (Russia)	69 / 70	Russian Railways	6,205	107	Daily	106 hrs (~4.5 days)	
9	Irkutsk (Russia)	Anapa (Russia)	205	Russian Railways	5,996	79	2 times a week (in Summer)	109 hrs (~4.5 days)	
10	Moscow (Russia)	Severobaykalsk (Russia)	91 / 92	Russian Railways	5,546	58	Every other day	87 hrs (~3.5 days)	
11	Moscow (Russia)	Ulan-Ude (Russia)	81 / 82	Russian Railways	5,499	71	Every other day	94 hrs (~4 days)	
12	Adler (Russia)	Tomsk (Russia)	115 / 116	Russian Railways	5,067	71	Every other day	93 hrs (~4 days)	
13	Adler (Russia)	Krasnoyarsk (Russia)	127 / 128	Russian Railways	5,037	70	2 or 3 times a week	94 hrs (~4 days)	
14	Adler (Russia)	Barnaul (Russia)	216	Russian Railways	4,983	74	Every other day (in peak seasons)	93 hrs (~4 days)	
15	Guangzhou (China)	Lhasa (China)	Z264/5-Z266/3	China Railway	4,980	14	Daily	54 hrs (~2.5 days)	
16	Anapa (Russia)	Krasnoyarsk (Russia)	211	Russian Railways	4,908	70	2 times a week	91 hrs (~4 days)	
17	Kislovodsk (Russia)	Novokuznetsk (Russia)	59	Russian Railways	4,734	69	Every other day	89 hrs (~4 days)	
18	Guangzhou (China)	Urumqi (China)	Z138/5-Z136/7 [zh]	China Railway	4,719	28	Daily	48 hrs (2 days)	
19	Murmansk (Russia)	Sevastopol (Crimea)	183/184	Grand Service Express	4,617	61	Once a week (in Summer)	87 hrs (~3.5 days)	
20	Toronto (Canada)	Vancouver (Canada)	The Canadian 1 / 2	Via Rail	4,466	65 (55 on request)	2 times a week	92 / 97 hrs (~4 days)	
21	Chicago (United States)	Los Angeles (United States)	Texas Eagle 21 / 22 (continues as part of Sunset Limited 1 / 2 in San Antonio)	Amtrak	4,390	40	3 times a week	65 hrs (~3 days)	
22	Moscow (Russia)	Abakan (Russia)	67 / 68	Russian Railways	4,380	70	Every other day	74 hrs (~3 days)	
23	Shanghai (China)	Lhasa (China)	Z164/3 [zh]	China Railway	4,372	16	Daily	44 hrs (~2 days)	
24	Sydney (Australia)	Perth (Australia)	Indian Pacific	Journey Beyond	4,352	26	Weekly	65 hrs (~2.5 days)	
25	Vorkuta (Russia)	Adler (Russia)	309 / 310	Russian Railways	4,299	78	Every other day	88 hrs (~3.5 days)	
26	Harbin (China)	Haikou (China)	Z114/3 [zh]	China Railway	4,268	23	Daily	46 hrs (~2 days)	
27	Changchun (China)	Haikou (China)	Z384/5-Z386/3 [zh]	China Railway	4,249	21	Daily	47 hrs (~2 days)	
28	Moscow (Russia)	Abakan (Russia)	77 / 78	Russian Railways	4,246	77	Every other day	76 hrs (~3 days)	
29	Dibrugarh (India)	Kanyakumari (India)	Dibrugarh–Kanyakumari Vivek Express / 22504	Indian Railways	4,155	60	Daily	75 hrs (~3 days)	
30	Shenyang (China)	Urumqi (China)	T302/3-T304/1 [zh]	China Railway	4,161	31	Daily	53 hrs (~2 days)	
31	Shanghai (China)	Urumqi (China)	Z40/42 + Z304/Z306	China Railway	4,129	24 / 22	Daily	39 hrs (~1.5 days)	
32	Moscow (Russia)	Almaty (Kazakhstan)	7 / 8 (additional carriage)	Kazakhstan Temir Joly	4,070	58	Every other day	83 hrs (~3.5 days)	
33	Changchun (China)	Kunming (China)	K2288/7 [zh]	China Railway	4,049	40	Daily	59 hrs (~2.5 days)	
34	Vorkuta (Russia)	Novorossiysk (Russia)	511 / 512	Russian Railways	4,037	72	Every other day (in Summer)	82 hours (~3.5 days)	
35	Mudanjiang (China)	Guangzhou (China)	K728/5-K726/7 [zh]	China Railway	3,996	49	Daily	54 hrs (~2 days)	
36	Kashgar (China)	Chengdu (China)	K454/1-K452/3 [zh]	China Railway	3,945	24	Daily	49 hrs (~2 days)	
37	Murmansk (Russia)	Adler (Russia)	225 / 226	Russian Railways	3,926	53	Every other day (in Summer)	77 hrs (~3 days)	
38	Chicago (United States)	Emeryville (United States)	California Zephyr 5 / 6	Amtrak	3,924	32	Daily	51 hrs (~2 days)	
39	Thiruvananthapuram Central (India)	Silchar (India)	Thiruvananthapuram - Silchar Aronai Express / 15608	Indian Railways	3,916	57	Weekly	72 hours (~3 days)	
40	Vorkuta (Russia)	Anapa (Russia)	295	Russian Railways	3,910	51	2 or 3 times a month	77 hrs (~3 days)	
41	Urumqi (China)	Yingtan (China)	T308/5-T306/7 [zh]	China Railway	3,860	23	Daily	44 hrs (~2 days)	
42	Urumqi (China)	Kunming (China)	K1502/3-K1504/1 [zh]	China Railway	3,790	28	Daily	46 hrs (~2 days)	
43	Shri Mata Vaishno Devi Katra (India)	Kanyakumari (India)	Himsagar Express/16318	Indian Railways	3,790	69	Weekly	73 hrs (~3 days)	
44	Moscow (Russia)	Bishkek (Kyrgyzstan)	317	Kyrgyz Railways	3,778	41	2 times a week	76 hrs (~3 days)	
45	Lhasa (China)	Beijing (China)	Z22/1 [zh]	China Railway	3,756	9	Daily	40 hrs (~1.5 days)	
46	Arkhangelsk (Russia)	Sevastopol (Crimea)	183/184 (additional carriage)	Grand Service Express	3,732	37	Once a week (in Summer)	70 hrs (~3 days)	
47	Murmansk (Russia)	Anapa (Russia)	293	Russian Railways	3,713	48	Every day (in Summer)	67 hrs (~3 days)	
48	Murmansk (Russia)	Novorossiysk (Russia)	285 / 286	Russian Railways	3,703	49	Every other day (in Summer)	70 hrs (~3 days)	
49	Jinan (China)	Urumqi (China)	Z105/6 [zh]	China Railway	3,651	22	Daily	36 hrs (~1.5 days)	
50	Kashgar (China)	Xi’an (China)	T269/70 [zh]	China Railway	3,649	23	Daily	38 hrs (~1.5 days)	

== Longest train services, by country/region, within it ==
Table below lists trains operating nationally, within a country.

=== Africa ===
==== Egypt ====
Origin City	Destination City	Train Name/No.	Operator Name	Distance	No. of stops	Frequency	Scheduled running time
Alexandria	Aswan	No. 88/89/1009/2008 Special ("Isbani")	Egyptian National Railways	1,100 km (approximate)	9	Daily	16 or 17 hrs

==== South Africa ====
Origin City	Destination City	Train Name/No.	Operator Name	Distance	No. of stops	Frequency	Scheduled running time
Pretoria	Cape Town	The Blue Train	Luxrail	1,600 km	7	Weekly	28 hrs

=== Asia ===
==== Central Asia ====
Origin City	Destination City	Train Name/No.	Operator Name	Distance	No. of stops	Frequency	Scheduled running time
Moscow	Almaty	8 / 7 (additional carriage)	Kazakhstan Temir Joly	4,070 km	58	Every other day	83 hrs (~3.5 days)
Moscow	Bishkek	317	Kyrgyz Railways	3,778 km	41	Twice a week	~88 hrs (~3.5 days)
Moscow	Tashkent	Uzbekistan 305	Uzbek Railways	3,379 km	30	Twice a week	67 hrs (~3 days)
Moscow	Karaganda	83	Kazakhstan Temir Joly	3,378 km	43	Twice a week	62 hrs (~2.5 days)
Kazan	Almaty	114 / 113	Kazakhstan Temir Joly	3,329 km	59	Оnce a week	64 hrs (~2.5 days)
Kazan	Bishkek	114 / 113 (additional carriage)	Kyrgyz Railways	3,278 km	56	Once a week	65 hrs (~2.5 days)
Aktau (Mangistau station)	Semey	37	Kazakhstan Temir Joly	3,242 km	54	Every other day	62 hrs (~2.5 days)
Saratov	Almaty	Kazakhstan 8 / 7	Kazakhstan Temir Joly	3,161 km	41	Every other day	62 hrs (~2.5 days)
Volgograd	Kulob	319	Tajik Railways	3,067 km	20	Оnce a week	72 hrs (~3 days)
Volgograd	Tashkent	123 / 124	Uzbek Railways	2,982 km	22	Twice a week	57 hrs (~2 days)
Volgograd	Dushanbe	329	Tajik Railways	2,816 km	22	Оnce a week	62 hrs (~2.5 days)
Aktau (Mangistau station)	Almaty	77	Kazakhstan Temir Joly	2,797 km	52	Daily	54 hrs (~2 days)
Volgograd	Khujand	359	Tajik Railways	2,784 km	20	Оnce a week	60 hrs (~2.5 days)
Uralsk	Almaty	28 / 27	Kazakhstan Temir Joly	2,720 km	17	Every other day	41 hrs (~1.5 days)
Chelyabinsk	Tashkent	306 / 305 (additional carriage)	Russian Railways	2,714 km	28	Оnce a week	53 hrs (~2 days)

==== China ====
All services are operated by China Railway.

Origin City	Destination City	Train Name/No.	Distance	No. of stops	Scheduled running time
Qiqihar	Ürümqi	K1084 / K1081	4,827 km	40	62 h 15 min (2 days +)
Yining	Shanghai	T206 / T203	4,742 km	32	54 h (2 days +)
Shenzhen	Urumqi	Z230 / Z231	4,657 km	20	48 h 17 mins (2 days +)
Shanghai	Lhasa	Z164 / Z166	4,373 km	12	48 h (2 days)
Beijing	Nyingchi via Lhasa	Z21 / Z22	4,367 km	21	60 h (2.5 days)
Harbin	Haikou	Z114 / Z112	4,276 km	29	46 hrs 54 mins (~2 days)
Kunming	Urumqi	K1502 / K1503	4,216 km	29	64 h (2 days +)
Hangzhou	Urumqi	K594 / K596	4,168 km	35	56 h (2 days +)
Changchun	Kunming	K2288 / K2286	4,141 km	57	68 hrs 33 mins (~3 days)
Shanghai	Urumqi	Z40 / Z42	4,077 km	24	45 h (2 days)
Shenyang	Guangzhou	Z12 / Z14	3,011 km	16	28 h (1 day)
Beijing	Nanning	G421 / G422; G529 / G530	2,489 km	24	13 h 32 min
Beijing	Hong Kong	G79 / G80	2,441 km	8	8 h 56 m
Beijing	Shenzhen	G71 / G72	2,400 km	17	10 h 16 min
Shanghai	Shenyang	D196 / D194	2,014 km	15	14 h

==== India ====
All services are operated by Indian Railways.

No.	Origin City	Destination City	Train Name/No.	Operator Name (Railway Zone)	Distance	No. of Stops	Frequency	Scheduled running time
1	Kanyakumari	Dibrugarh	Vivek Express (22504/22503)	Northeast Frontier Railway	4,155 kilometres (2,582 mi)	60	Daily	74 hrs (~3 days)
2	Thiruvananthapuram Central	Silchar	Aronai Express (15607/15608)	Northeast Frontier Railway	3,916 kilometres (2,433 mi)	57	Weekly	71 hrs 20 min (~3 days)
3	Kanyakumari	Shri Mata Vaishno Devi Katra	Himsagar Express (16317/16318)	Southern Railway	3,789 kilometres (2,354 mi)	66	Weekly	68 hrs 45 min(~3 days)

==== Indonesia ====
All services are operated by Kereta Api Indonesia.

For simplicity, only train trips with milage over 850 km are shown

Origin City	Destination City	Train Name/No.	Distance	No. of stops	Frequency	Scheduled running time
Jakarta (Pasar Senen)	Ketapang (Banyuwangi) via Semarang and Surabaya	Blambangan Express	1,031 km	27	Daily	16 hours and 31 minutes (to Jakarta); 16 hours and 30 minutes (to Ketapang, Banyuwangi)
Bandung	Ketapang (Banyuwangi) via Yogyakarta and Surabaya	Sangkuriang	1,002 km	23 to 24	Daily	16 hours and 7 minutes (to Ketapang, Banyuwangi); 17 hours and 30 minutes (to Bandung)
Jakarta (Gambir)	Jember via Semarang and Surabaya	Pandalungan	919 km	20	Twice daily	12 hours and 30 minutes (to Jakarta); 13 hours and 5 minutes (to Jember)
Jakarta (Gambir)	Malang via Yogyakarta	Gajayana	905 km	20	Daily	12 hours and 10 minutes (to Jakarta); 12 hours and 16 minutes (to Malang)
Jakarta (Gambir)	Malang via Semarang	Brawijaya	881 km	19 (to Jakarta); 18 (to Malang)	Daily	12 hours and 10 minutes (to Jakarta); 11 hours and 53 minutes (to Malang)
Jakarta (Pasar Senen)	Malang via Semarang	Majapahit	880 km	20 (to Jakarta); 22 (to Malang)	Daily	13 hours and 52 minutes (to Jakarta); 12 hours and 48 minutes (to Malang)
Jakarta (Pasar Senen)	Malang via Semarang	Matarmaja	880 km	31 (to Jakarta); 33 (to Malang)	Daily	15 hours and 29 minutes (to Jakarta); 14 hours and 52 minutes (from Jakarta)

==== Japan ====
Origin city	Destination city	Train name/No	Operator name	Distance	No. of stops	Scheduled running time
Tokyo	Hakata	Nozomi	Central Japan Railway Company / West Japan Railway Company	1,174.9 km	11	4 hrs 53 mins
Tokyo	Izumo	Sunrise Izumo	West Japan Railway Company / Central Japan Railway Company	953.6 km	17	12 hrs 11 mins
Shin-Osaka	Kagoshima	Mizuho	Kyushu Railway Company / West Japan Railway Company	911.2 km	7	3 hrs 44 mins
Tokyo	Hakodate	Hayabusa	Hokkaido Railway Company / East Japan Railway Company	862.5 km	5	4 hrs 2 mins
Tokyo	Kotohira	Sunrise Seto (Seasonal)	West Japan Railway Company / Central Japan Railway Company	848.7 km	14	11 hrs 13 mins
Tokyo	Takamatsu	Sunrise Seto	West Japan Railway Company / Central Japan Railway Company	804.7 km	11	9 hrs 27 mins

==== Pakistan ====
All services are operated by Pakistan Railways.

Origin city	Destination city	Train name/No	Distance	No. of stops	Scheduled running time
Karachi	Peshawar	Khyber Mail / 1UP/2DN	1,732 km	41	32 hrs 00 mins
Karachi	Peshawar	Awam Express / 13UP/14DN	1,721 km	61	33 hrs 35 mins
Peshawar	Quetta	Jaffar Express / 39UP/40DN	1,632 km	37	30 hrs 10 mins
Karachi	Islamabad	Green Line Express / 5UP/6DN	1,518 km	8	23 hrs 45 mins

==== Russia ====
All services are operated by Russian Railways.

Including international trains through Petropavlovsk in Kazakhstan.

Correct as of November 2024. See main table for sourcing of all these services.

Origin City	Destination City	Train Name/No.	Distance	No. of stops	Frequency	Scheduled running time
Moscow	Vladivostok	Rossiya 1/2	9,300 km	140	Daily	164 hrs (~7 days)
Moscow	Vladivostok	9/10	9,259 km	81	Daily	147 hrs (~6 days)
Kislovodsk	Neryungri	97 (additional carriage)	7,963 km	122	Every other day	150 hrs (~6 days)
Chita	Adler	269/270	7,504 km	95	3 times a week (in Summer)	140 hrs (~6 days)
Chita	Anapa	69 (additional carriage)	7,070 km	109	Daily	135 hrs (~5.5 days)
Moscow	Neryungri	82 (additional carriage) / 375 (additional carriage)	6,950 km	101	Every other day	124 hrs (~5 days)
Adler	Severobaykalsk	273/274	6,883 km	91	Weekly (in Summer)	125 hrs (~5 days)
Moscow	Chita	69/70	6,205 km	107	Daily	106 hrs (~4.5 days)
Irkutsk	Anapa	205	5,996 km	79	2 times a week (in Summer)	109 hrs (~4.5 days)
Moscow	Severobaykalsk	91/92	5,546 km	58	Every other day	87 hrs (~3.5 days)
Moscow	Ulan-Ude	81/82	5,499 km	72	Every other day	94 hrs (~4 days)
Adler	Tomsk	115/116	5,067 km	71	Every other day	93 hrs (~4 days)
Adler	Krasnoyarsk	127/128	5,037 km	70	2 or 3 times a week	94 hrs (~4 days)
Adler	Barnaul	216	4,983 km	74	Every other day (in peak seasons)	93 hrs (~4 days)
Anapa	Krasnoyarsk	211	4,908 km	70	2 times a week	91 hrs (~4 days)
Kislovodsk	Novokuznetsk	59	4,734 km	69	Every other day	89 hrs (~4 days)

==== South Korea ====
All services are operated by Korail.

Origin City	Destination City	Train Name/No.	Distance	No. of stops	Frequency	Scheduled running time
Cheongnyangni	Bujeon	1621–1624	483.1 km	18/31	Twice daily	7 ~ 8 hrs
Jeongdongjin (Gangneung)	Busan	1691/1692	480.5 km		Daily	7.9 hrs
Jeongdongjin (Gangneung)	Bujeon	1681/1682	453.5 km		Daily	7.9 hrs
Bujeon	Mokpo via Seogwangju	1951/1954	390.9 km	46	Daily	6.5 hrs
Dongdaegu	Yeongju via Daejeon	4301–4304	387.5 km	22	Twice daily	5.25 hrs

==== Taiwan ====
Origin City	Destination City	Train Name/No.	Operator Name	Distance	No. of stops	Frequency	Scheduled running time
Taipei	Hualien	51/52	Taiwan Railways Administration	752 km	17	Daily	10 hours 30 mins

==== Thailand ====
Origin City	Destination City	Train Name/No.	Operator Name	Distance	No. of stops	Frequency	Scheduled running time
Bangkok	Singapore	951/952	Locomotive : SRT & KTMB / Service : Eastern & Oriental Express	1,907 km	5	Special deluxe excursion train	2 days 3 hrs 25 mins
Bangkok	Su-ngai Kolok	37/38	SRT	1,174 km	27	Daily	20 hrs 10 mins
Bangkok	Su-ngai Kolok	171/172	SRT	1,174 km	39	Daily	21 hrs 45 mins
Bangkok	Butterworth	35/36	SRT	1,147 km	23	Daily	22 hrs 10 mins

==== Uzbekistan ====
All services are operated by Uzbek Railways.

Origin City	Destination City	Train Name/No.	Distance	No. of stops	Frequency	Scheduled running time
Andijan	Kungrad	127 / 128	1,667 km	19	Twice a week	26 hrs 30 mins
Andijan	Khiva	125 / 126	1,457 km	13	Daily	21 hrs 23 mins
Andijan	Urgench	131 / 132 (additional carriage)	1,420 km	15	Once a week	22 hrs 46 mins
Tashkent	Kungrad	54 / 53	1,281 km	13	Daily	19 hrs 18 mins
Andijan	Termez	129 / 130	1,240 km	16	4 times a week	20 hrs 28 mins
Tashkent	Khiva	76 / 75 (additional carriage)	1,067 km	9	Once a week	16 hrs 5 mins
Tashkent	Shavat	58 / 57	1,055 km	7	3 times a week	13 hrs 54 mins
Tashkent	Khiva	56 / 55	1,049 km	7	4 times a week	13 hrs 55 mins

==== Vietnam ====
Origin City	Destination City	Train Name/No.	Operator Name	Distance	No. of stops	Frequency	Scheduled running time
Hanoi	Ho Chi Minh City	TN1/TN2	Vietnam Railways	1,726 km	39	Daily	40 hrs 50 mins

=== Europe ===
==== International services ====
Origin City	Destination City	Train Name/No.	Operator Name	Distance	No. of stops	Frequency	Scheduled running time
Stockholm (Sweden)	Innsbruck (Austria) via Zell am See	304/305	Snälltåget	2,350 km	16	Once a year in February	28 hrs 17 mins
Malmö (Sweden)	Innsbruck (Austria) via Zell am See	304/305	Snälltåget	1,720 km	15	Weekly in winter and July	22 hrs 05 mins
Stockholm (Sweden)	Dresden (Germany)	308/309	Snälltåget	1,630 km (approximate)	13	Weekly in May and September	22 hrs 10 mins
Brussels (Belgium)	Prague (Czech Republic)	452/453	European Sleeper	1,510 km (approximate)	19	Thrice-weekly	15 hrs 30 mins
Stockholm (Sweden)	Narvik (Norway)	93/94	SJ	1,467 km	25	Daily (resumes 13 December 2026)	18 hrs 37 mins
Stockholm (Sweden)	Berlin (Germany) via Hamburg	300/301	Snälltåget	1,450 km (approximate)	12	6 times a week in spring and summer	17 hrs 20 mins
Stockholm (Sweden)	Berlin (Germany) via Hamburg	EN 345/346	RDC Deutschland	1,450 km (approximate)	11	Weekly	15 hrs 20 mins
Villach (Austria)	Edirne (Turkey)		Optima Tours	1,400 km (approximate)	0	1-2 times a week in summer	34 hrs
Budapest (Hungary)	Kiel (Germany) via Bratislava, Prague, Berlin, and Hamburg	RJ 174 Hungaria	DB, ČD, ZSSK, MÁV	1,379 km	23	6 times a week	14 hrs 10 mins
Hamburg (Germany)	Vienna (Austria)	NJ 492/493	ÖBB	1,313 km	12	Daily	14 hrs 53 mins
Vienna (Austria)	Brussels (Belgium)	NJ 468/469	ÖBB	1,309 km	13	3 times a week	15 hrs 19 mins
Bordeaux (France)	Frankfurt am Main (Germany)	TGV 9594/9599	SNCF Voyageurs	1,279 km	12	Weekly in July/August	7 hrs 53 mins
Paris (France)	Berlin (Germany) via Hamburg	ES 474/475	European Sleeper	1,250 km (approximate)	5	3 times a week	16 hrs 14 mins
Münster (Germany)	Graz (Austria)	ICE 118/119 Wörthersee	Deutsche Bahn	1,241 km	32	Daily	12 hrs 50 mins
Vienna (Austria)	Amsterdam (Netherlands)	NJ 40490/40421	ÖBB	1,210 km (approximate)	16/19	Daily	13 hrs 48 mins
Perpignan (France)	Brussels (Belgium)	TGV 9862	SNCF Voyageurs	1,210 km (approximate)	14	2 times a week	8 hrs 41 mins
Berlin (Germany)	Paris (France)	ICE 9590/9591	Deutsche Bahn	1,201 km	8	Daily	8 hrs 06 mins

==== Albania ====
All services are operated by Hekurudha Shqiptare.

Origin City	Destination City	Distance	No. of stops	Frequency	Scheduled running time	Ref.	Note
Durrës	Elbasan	75.7 km	5	daily	2 hrs 45-47 mins		
Durrës	Shkodër	104.5 km	1 (Vorë)	2 per day	3 hrs 50 mins		Not in operation due to bad infrastructure (expected to return)

==== Belarus ====
All services are operated by Belarusian Railways.

Origin City	Destination City	Train Name/No.	Distance	No. of stops	Frequency	Scheduled running time
Brest	Polotsk	606 / 605	893 km	29	Daily	16 hrs, 10 mins
Gomel	Grodno	631 / 632	801 km	20	Daily	15 hrs, 10 mins
Grodno	Kastsyukovichy (Kommunary Station)	634 / 633	773 km	24	Daily	16 hrs, 9 mins
Brest	Polotsk	658 / 657	761 km	26	Daily	14 hrs, 1 mins
Gomel	Grodno	609 / 610	658 km	21	Daily	12 hrs, 56 mins

==== Belgium ====
Origin City	Destination City	Train Name/No.	Operator Name	Distance	No. of stops	Frequency	Scheduled running time
Ostend	Eupen	IC01	NMBS/SNCB	250 km	11-12	15 daytime trains (Hourly from 04.40 AM – 6.40 PM) + 3 trains to Welkenraedt (245 km) (7.40 PM – 9.40 PM)	3 hrs, 2 mins

==== Bulgaria ====
Origin City	Destination City	Train Name/No.	Operator Name	Distance	No. of stops	Frequency	Scheduled running time
Sofia	Varna	2601	BDZ	543 km	10	4 daytime trains, 1 overnight train	7 hrs, 5 mins

==== Croatia ====
Origin City	Destination City	Train Name/No.	Operator Name	Distance	No. of stops	Frequency	Scheduled running time
Osijek	Split	1880/1881	HŽ	709 km	15	Daily Mon-Sat during July and August	13 hrs, 28 mins

==== Czech Republic ====
Origin City	Destination City	Train Name/No.	Operator Name	Distance	No. of stops	Frequency	Scheduled running time	Ref.
Ostrava	Karlovy Vary	SC 504	České dráhy	621 km	14	daily	7 hrs, 2 mins	

==== Denmark ====
Origin City	Destination City	Train Name/No.	Operator Name	Distance	No. of stops	Frequency	Scheduled running time	Ref.
Copenhagen Airport	Aalborg Airport	Various	DSB	475 km	14	12 per day	4 hrs, 47 mins	

==== Finland ====
Origin City	Destination City	Train Name/No.	Operator Name	Distance	No. of stops	Frequency	Scheduled running time	Ref.
Kolari	Helsinki	262	VR	995 km	16	Seasonal, 2 to 3 times a week	16 hrs 1 min	

==== France ====
All services are operated by SNCF Voyageurs.

Origin City	Destination City	Train Name/No.	Distance	No. of stops	Frequency	Scheduled running time	Ref.
Nancy	Nice	TGV 5537 / 5516	1,199 km	17	Daily (ends 12 December 2026)	10 hrs 06 mins	
Nantes	Marseille	TGV 5306	1,163 km	8	Weekly (On Fridays)	6 hrs 40 mins	
Rennes	Marseille	TGV 5332 / 5386 / 5382	1,116 km	6-7	Daily + Twice on Saturdays	5 hrs 50 mins	
Rennes	Montpellier	TGV 5336	1,100 km	7	Weekly (On Sundays)	6 hrs 4 mins	

==== Germany ====
Origin City	Destination City	Train Name/No.	Operator Name	Distance	No. of stops	Frequency	Scheduled running time	Ref.
Hamburg	Passau	ICE 927	Deutsche Bahn	1,125 km	16	Daily	11 hrs 05 mins	
Munich	Hamburg	ICE 618	Deutsche Bahn	1,119 km	21	Daily	12 hrs 10 mins	

==== Ireland ====
All services are operated by Iarnród Éireann.

Origin City	Destination	Distance	No. of stops	Frequency	Scheduled running time	Ref.
Dublin Heuston	Tralee Casement	333 km	9-11	1 daily Monday-Saturday, 3 daily Sunday	3 hrs 42 mins-3 hrs 55 mins	
Rosslare Europort	Dundalk Clarke	254 km	26	1 daily Monday-Friday	4 hrs 43 mins	

==== Italy ====
All services are operated by Trenitalia.

Origin City	Destination City	Train Name/No.	Distance	No. of stops	Frequency	Scheduled running time
Milan	Siracusa	ICN 1962/1963	1,500 km (approximate)	32-34	Daily	19 hrs 30 mins - 20 hrs 30 mins
Turin	Reggio Calabria	ICN 37646/795	1,500 km (approximate)	32-34	Daily	18 hrs
Turin	Reggio Calabria	Frecciarossa 9583/9584 + 9587/9588 + 9642	1,400 km (approximate)	16-22	2-3 times daily	11 hrs

==== Liechtenstein ====
Origin City	Destination City	Operator Name	Distance	No. of stops	Frequency	Scheduled running time	Ref.
Nendeln	Schaan-Vaduz	ÖBB	4.4 km	2	11 in each direction daily Monday-Friday	5 mins	

These services are actually international, as they go between Feldkirch, Austria and Buchs, Switzerland. The indicated distance is between the first and last station in Liechtenstein.

==== Luxembourg ====
Origin City	Destination City	Operator Name	Distance	No. of stops	Frequency	Scheduled running time
Troisvierges	Rodange	CFL	109 km	21	14 daily	2 hrs 3 mins

==== Netherlands ====
Origin City	Destination City	Train Name/No.	Operator Name	Distance	No. of stops	Frequency	Scheduled running time
Den Helder	Maastricht	IC 2727/2729	NS	300 km	17	2 daily Monday-Thursday	3 hrs 47 mins

==== Norway ====
Origin City	Destination City	Train Name/No.	Operator Name	Distance	No. of stops	Frequency	Scheduled running time
Bodø	Trondheim	471/472/475/476	SJ Norge	728 km	27	Twice daily	9 hrs 38 mins

==== Poland ====
Origin City	Destination City	Train Name/No.	Operator Name	Distance	No. of stops	Frequency	Scheduled running time	Ref.
Przemyśl	Świnoujście	IC 38173 Przemyślanin	PKP Intercity	1,054 km	33	daily	15 hrs 51 mins	

==== Portugal ====
Origin City	Destination City	Train Name/No.	Operator Name	Distance	No. of stops	Frequency	Scheduled running time
Porto	Faro	180 and 184 (southbound); 182 and 186 (northbound)	CP	651 km	11 (180, 184 and 186), 15 (182)	Daily	5 hrs 1 mins (180 and 184); 5 hrs 58 min (182 and 186)

==== Romania ====
Origin City	Destination City	Train Name/No.	Operator Name	Distance	No. of Stops	Frequency	Scheduled running time
Timișoara	Iași	1765/1763	CFR	849 km	41	Daily	17 hrs 2 mins (1765) 17 hrs 27 mins (1763)

==== Russia ====
All services are operated by Russian Railways.

Only services within European Russia (i.e. west of the Urals) are listed in this subcategory.

Correct as of July 2025. See main table for sourcing of all these services.

Origin City	Destination City	Train Name/No.	Operator Name	Distance	No. of stops	Frequency	Scheduled running time
Vorkuta	Adler	309 / 310	RZD	4,299 km	77	Every other day	88 hrs (~3.5 days)
Vorkuta	Novorossiysk	511 / 512	RZD	4,037 km	71	Every other day (in Summer)	82 hrs (~3 days)
Murmansk	Adler	225 / 226	RZD	3,926 km	53	Every other day (in Summer)	77 hrs (~3 days)
Vorkuta	Anapa	295	RZD	3,910 km	51	2 or 3 times a month	77 hrs (~3 days)
Murmansk	Anapa	293	RZD	3,713 km	48	Every day (in Summer)	67 hrs (~3 days)
Murmansk	Novorossiysk	285 / 286	RZD	3,703 km	49	Every other day (in Summer)	70 hrs (~3 days)

==== Slovakia ====
All services are operated by ZSSK.

Origin City	Destination City	Train Name/No.	Distance	No. of stops	Frequency	Scheduled running time
Bratislava	Humenné	R 615 / 614 Zemplín	540 km	25	Daily	7 hrs 53 mins
Bratislava	Humenné	Ex 15621 / 17630 Šarišan	514 km	20	Once a week	6 hrs 54 mins

==== Spain ====
All services are operated by Renfe.

Origin City	Destination City	Train Name/No.	Distance	No. of stops	Frequency	Scheduled running time
Barcelona	A Coruña	Alvia 00625/00626	1,358 km	24	Daily	13 hrs 20 mins (00625) 13 hrs (00626)
Barcelona	Cádiz	Torre del Oro 00697/00694	1,250 km (approximate)	24	Daily	30 hrs 30 mins

==== Sweden ====
Origin City	Destination City	Train Name/No.	Operator Name	Distance	No. of stops	Frequency	Scheduled running time
Malmö	Storlien	3920/3921	Snälltåget	1,450 km (approximate)	13	Twice a week in winter and summer	16 hrs 55 mins
Stockholm	Luleå	93/94	SJ	1,060 km (approximate)	12	Daily	12 hrs 20 mins

==== Switzerland ====
Origin City	Destination City	Train Name/No.	Operator Name	Distance	No. of stops	Frequency	Scheduled running time
St Gallen	Geneva Airport	IC1	SBB CFF FFS	350 km (approximate)	9	Hourly	4 hrs 02 mins
Basel	Chiasso	IC21	SBB CFF FFS	300 km (approximate)	8	2 times a day	3 hrs, 51 mins
St Moritz	Bahnhof Zermatt	Glacier Express	Rhaetian Railway & Matterhorn-Gotthard-Bahn	291 km (approximate)	13	Daily, up to 3 Trains	8 hrs 22 mins

==== Ukraine ====
All services are operated by Ukrainian Railways.

Origin City	Destination	Train Name/No.	Distance	No. of stops	Frequency	Scheduled running time	Ref.
Rakhiv	Mariupol	006	1,800 km (approximate)	14	Every other day	29 hrs	
Uzhhorod	Lysychansk	045/046	1,683 km	43	Daily	31 hrs	

==== United Kingdom ====
Origin	Destination	Headcode	Operator	Distance	No. of stops	Frequency	Scheduled running time	Ref.
Aberdeen	Plymouth	1V60	CrossCountry	1,118km	34	Monday – Saturday	11 hrs 27 min	
London Euston	Inverness	1S25	Caledonian Sleeper	925km	16	Sunday – Friday	11 hrs 30 min	
London Euston	Fort William	1S25/1Y11	Caledonian Sleeper	909km	20	Sunday – Friday	12 hrs 45 min	

=== North America ===
==== Canada ====
All services are operated by Via Rail.

Origin City	Destination City	Train Name/No.	Distance	No. of stops	Frequency	Scheduled running time
Toronto	Vancouver	The Canadian 1 / 2	4.466 km	65 (55 on request)	Bi-weekly	92 / 97 hrs (~4 days)
Winnipeg	Churchill	690, 692 / 691, 693	1,710 km	70 (most on request)	Bi-weekly	45 hrs (~2 days)
Montreal	Halifax	Ocean 14 / 15	1,346 km	26	Tri-weekly	23 hrs
Jasper	Prince Rupert	5 / 6	1,160 km	32 (8 regular stops)	Tri-weekly	24 hrs + Overnight stop at Prince George

==== United States ====
All services are operated by Amtrak.

Origin City	Destination City	Train Name/No.	Distance	No. of stops	Frequency	Scheduled running time	Ref.
Chicago	Los Angeles	Texas Eagle 421 / 422	4,390 km	43	Daily to San Antonio, Tri-weekly to Los Angeles	62 / 65 hrs (~2.5 days)	
Emeryville	Chicago	California Zephyr 5 / 6	3,924 km	33	Daily	52 hrs (~2 days)	
Chicago	Los Angeles	Southwest Chief 3 / 4	3,645 km	31	Daily	43 hrs (~2 days)	
Chicago	Portland	Empire Builder 27 / 28	3,635 km	37	Daily	45 hrs (~2 days)	
Chicago	Seattle	Empire Builder 7 / 8	3,549 km	38	Daily	45 hrs (~2 days)	
Chicago	Miami	Floridian 40 / 41	3,341 km	46	Daily	47 hrs (~2 days)	
New Orleans	Los Angeles	Sunset Limited 1 / 2	3,211 km	20	Tri-weekly	46 hrs (~2 days)	
New York	Miami	Silver Meteor 97 / 98	2,235 km	33	Daily	28 hrs (~1 day)	

=== South America ===
==== Argentina ====
Origin City	Destination City	Train Name/No.	Operator Name	Distance	No. of stops	Frequency	Scheduled running time	Ref.
Buenos Aires	Tucuman	265/266	Trenes Argentinos	1,170 km	16	Bi-Weekly	32 hrs	

==== Brazil ====
Origin City	Destination City	Train Name/No.	Operator Name	Distance	No. of stops	Frequency	Scheduled running time	Ref.
São Luís	Parauapebas	EFC	Vale	870 km	15	Tri-Weekly	15.2 hrs	
Belo Horizonte	Cariacica	EFVM	Vale	664 km	30	Daily	12.9 hrs	

=== Oceania ===
==== Australia ====
Origin City	Destination City	Train Name/No.	Operator Name	Distance	No. of stops	Frequency	Scheduled running time
Sydney	Perth	Indian Pacific	Journey Beyond	4,352 km	26	Weekly	65 hrs
Adelaide	Darwin	The Ghan	Journey Beyond	2,979 km	4	Weekly	54 hrs
Adelaide	Brisbane	Great Southern	Journey Beyond	2,885 km	5	Weekly	66 hrs
Brisbane	Cairns	Spirit of Queensland	Queensland Rail	1,681 km	26	5 times per week	25 hrs
Brisbane	Longreach	Spirit of the Outback	Queensland Rail	1,325 km	20	2 times per week	26 hrs
Sydney	Broken Hill	Outback Xplorer	NSW TrainLink	1,135 km	16	Weekly	13 hrs
Sydney	Brisbane	NT31 / 32	NSW TrainLink	988 km	22	Daily	14 hrs 12 min
Townsville	Mount Isa	The Inlander	Queensland Rail	977 km	9	2 times per week	21 hrs
Sydney	Melbourne	ST621 / 622 / 623 / 624	NSW TrainLink	960 km	16	Twice daily each way	10 hrs 50 min
Adelaide	Melbourne	The Overland	Journey Beyond	828 km	9	2 times per week	10 hrs 30 min
Sydney	Casino	NT33 / 34	NSW TrainLink	806 km	20	Daily	11 hrs 25 min

==== New Zealand ====
Origin City	Destination City	Train Name/No.	Operator Name	Distance	No. of stops	Frequency	Scheduled running time
Auckland	Wellington	Northern Explorer 200 / 201	KiwiRail Scenic Journeys	682 km	7	3 times per week	11 hrs

== Longest non-stop train services, by distance and country ==
=== Asia ===
==== China ====
No.	Origin	Destination	Train Name/No.	Operator Name	Distance	Frequency	Running Time	Average Speed	Ref.
1	Beijing West	Harbin West	Z17 / Z18	China Railway	1,249 km	Daily	10 hrs 3 min	120 km/h	

==== India ====
Only trains with limited stops are listed below

No.	Origin City	Destination City	Operator Name (Railway Zone)	Distance	Frequency	Travelling Time
1	Ahmedabad – Mumbai Central	Mumbai Central–Hapa Duronto Express	Western Railway	493 km	Daily	5 hrs 50 min
2	Bilaspur Junction - Tatanagar Junction	Pune–Howrah Duronto Express	South Eastern Railway	468 km	Bi-Weekly	6 hrs 05 min
2	Bilaspur Junction - Tatanagar Junction	Mumbai CST–Howrah Duronto Express	South Eastern Railway	468 km	M, T, W, F	5 hrs 57 min
3	New Delhi – Kota Junction	Mumbai Rajdhani Express	Western Railway	465 km	Daily	4 hrs 35 min
3	New Delhi – Kota Junction	Mumbai–New Delhi Duronto Express	Western Railway	465 km	Bi-Weekly	5 hrs 35 min

=== Europe ===
==== France ====
No.	Origin	Destination	Operator Name	Distance	Frequency	Running Time	Average Speed	Ref.
1	Paris - Gare de Lyon	Marseille-Saint-Charles	SNCF Voyageurs	750 km	Multiple daily	3 hrs 4 min	245 km/h	

==== Ireland ====
No.	Origin	Destination	Operator Name	Distance	Frequency	Running Time	Average Speed	Ref.
1	Cork Kent	Dublin Heuston	Iarnród Éireann	266 km	Daily Monday-Friday	2 hrs 15 min	118 km/h	

==== Sweden ====
No.	Origin	Destination	Operator Name	Distance	Frequency	Running Time	Average Speed	Ref.
1	Stockholm	Gothenburg	SJ	455 km	Monday-Friday, Sunday	2 hrs 54 min (some days slightly slower)	157 km/h	

=== North America ===
==== United States ====
No.	Origin	Destination	Train Name/No	Operator Name	Distance	Frequency	Running Time	Average Speed	Ref.
1	Lorton, Virginia	Sanford, Florida	Auto Train, 52/53	Amtrak	1,376 km	Daily	17 hrs	81 km/h	

== Longest high-speed rail service ==
The China Railway G403/4, G405/6 and D939/40 Beijing–Kunming high-speed train (2,653 km, 10 hours 43 minutes to 14 hours 54 minutes), which began service on January 1, 2017, is the longest high-speed rail service in the world.

The previous record-holder was the likewise Chinese Beijing–Guangzhou high-speed railway at 2,230 km.

Eurostar previously held the record for its London to Cannes route, which set a record of 1,421 km non-stop high-speed service in 2006 (prior to the opening of High Speed One) – this was however not a regularly scheduled service. Currently, the record holder outside China is the Eurostar service from Amsterdam to Marseille, at 1,265 km in 7 hrs, 15 mins.
