= Almaty-1 station =

Railway station in Almaty, Kazakhstan

Almaty-1
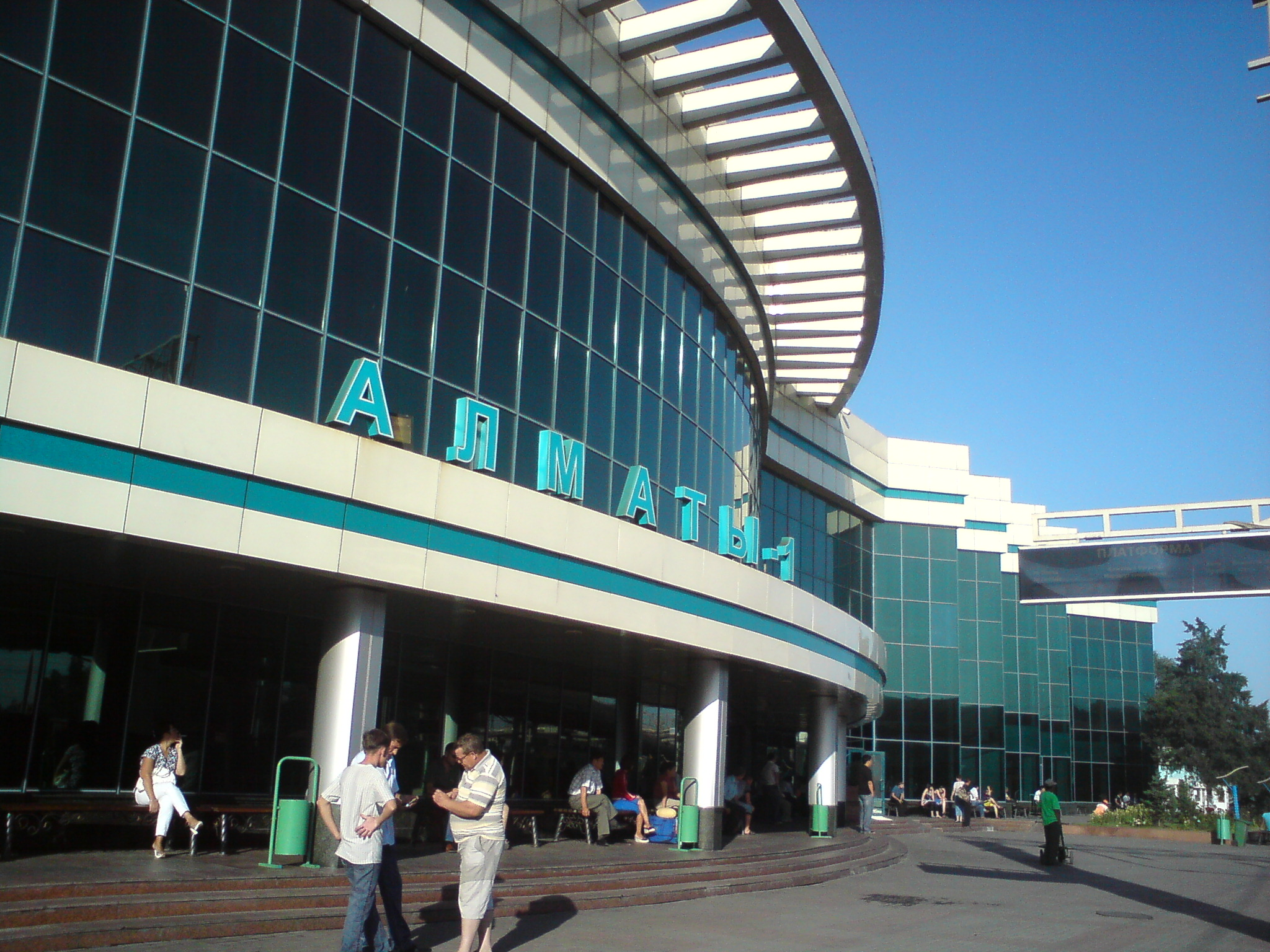
- Entrance to the station

General information
- Coordinates: 43.3409°N 76.9488°E
- System: Kazakhstan Temir Zholy
- Owner: Kazakhstan Temir Zholy
- Platforms: 2
- Tracks: 3

Construction
- Parking: Yes

Other information
- Station code: 700007

History
- Opened: 1929
- Rebuilt: 1974, 2007, 2013-2014

Services
Preceding station	KTJ	Following station
Boraldai towards Novosibirsk, Russia	Turkestan–Siberia Railway	Almaty-2 towards Arys I
Borondai towards Otar	Almaty elektrichka	Elevator towards Almaty-2
Borondai towards Qosqodyk	Almaty elektrichka	Elevator towards Almaty-2
Location

Almaty-1 (Kazakh: Almaty-1 stansasy) is a railway station located in the city of Almaty, Kazakhstan, and is one of two principal stations in the city. Almaty-1 serves as a primary point of departure for passengers traveling both within Kazakhstan and internationally. The station was built initially in 1929 and rebuilt between 1969 and 1975.

== Design ==
The exterior of the station is decorated with a mix of glass windows and aluminum panels. The ground floor of the station houses office spaces while the second and third floors have facilities for relaxation and dining. The passenger platforms are located in the underground levels of the station. A monument to Alibi Zhangildinu, a politician and military leader who helped to establish Soviet control in Kazakhstan, stands outside the station.

== History ==
The first train to reach Almaty, an E-1441 locomotive, arrived on July 19, 1929. This train was put on permanent display at Almaty-2 station in 1974. Soon after the arrival of the railroad, Almaty-1 station was built to bring high-ranking workers and foreign guests to the republic. After the Turksib district was established, it helped bring industry to Almaty and in later years, transformed Krasnogvardeyskiy Prospekt (now named Suyunbay) into an industrial zone. The first suburban train, named "Gorvetka," made up of nine commodities cars and one passenger car, departed from Almaty-1 station on January 25, 1930, inaugurating the era of public transportation in Almaty. Almaty-1 served as a departure point for both industrial goods and workers. Meanwhile, intercity passenger trains arrived at Almaty-1, while suburban trains went on to Almaty-2. As the production of industrial goods in the area increased, the number of industrial jobs also grew. This in turn led to significant increases in the population of nearby residential areas and consequentially, an increase of passengers at Almaty-1 station.

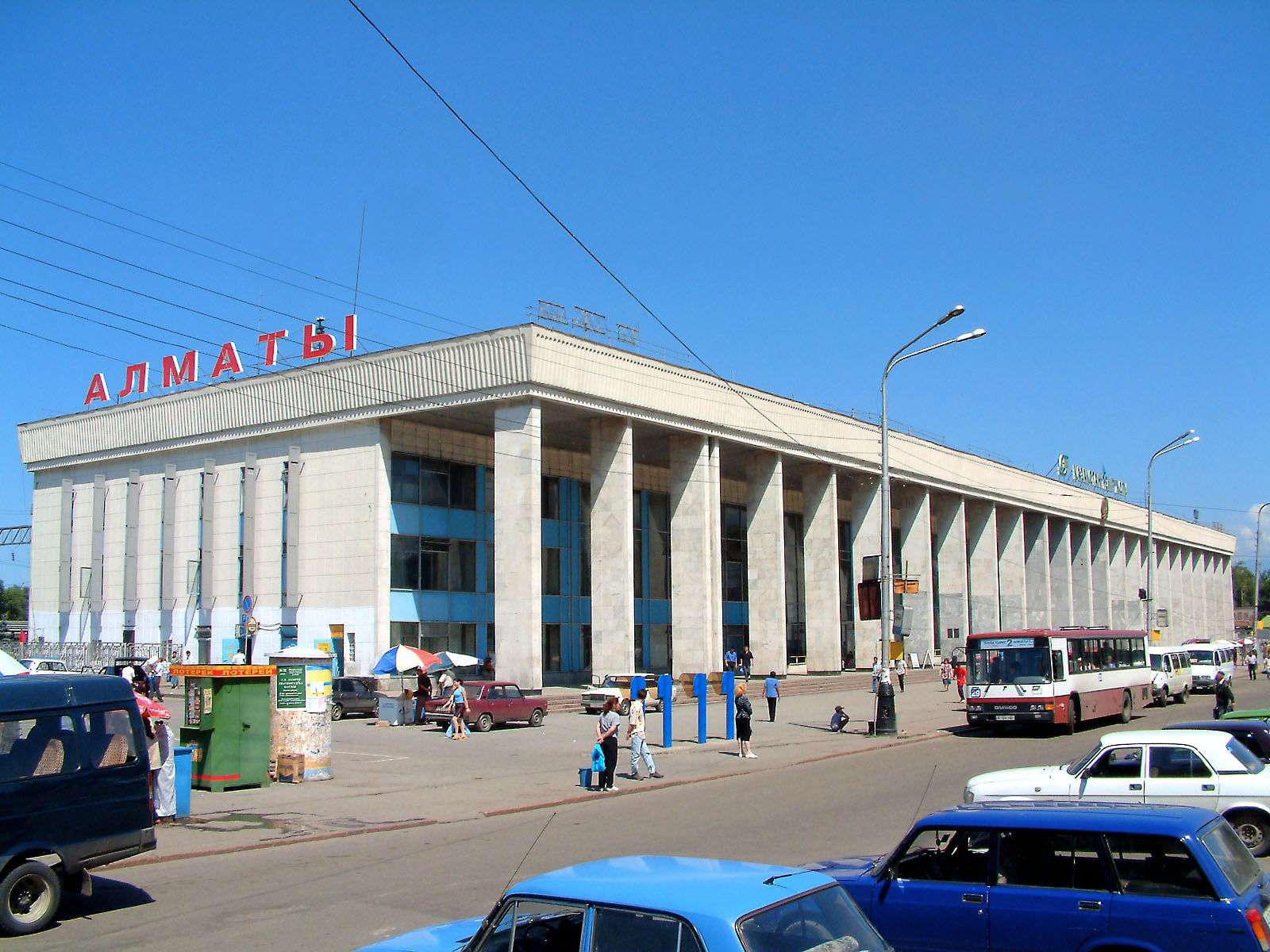
Old Almaty-1 station building before it was reconstructed in 2007.

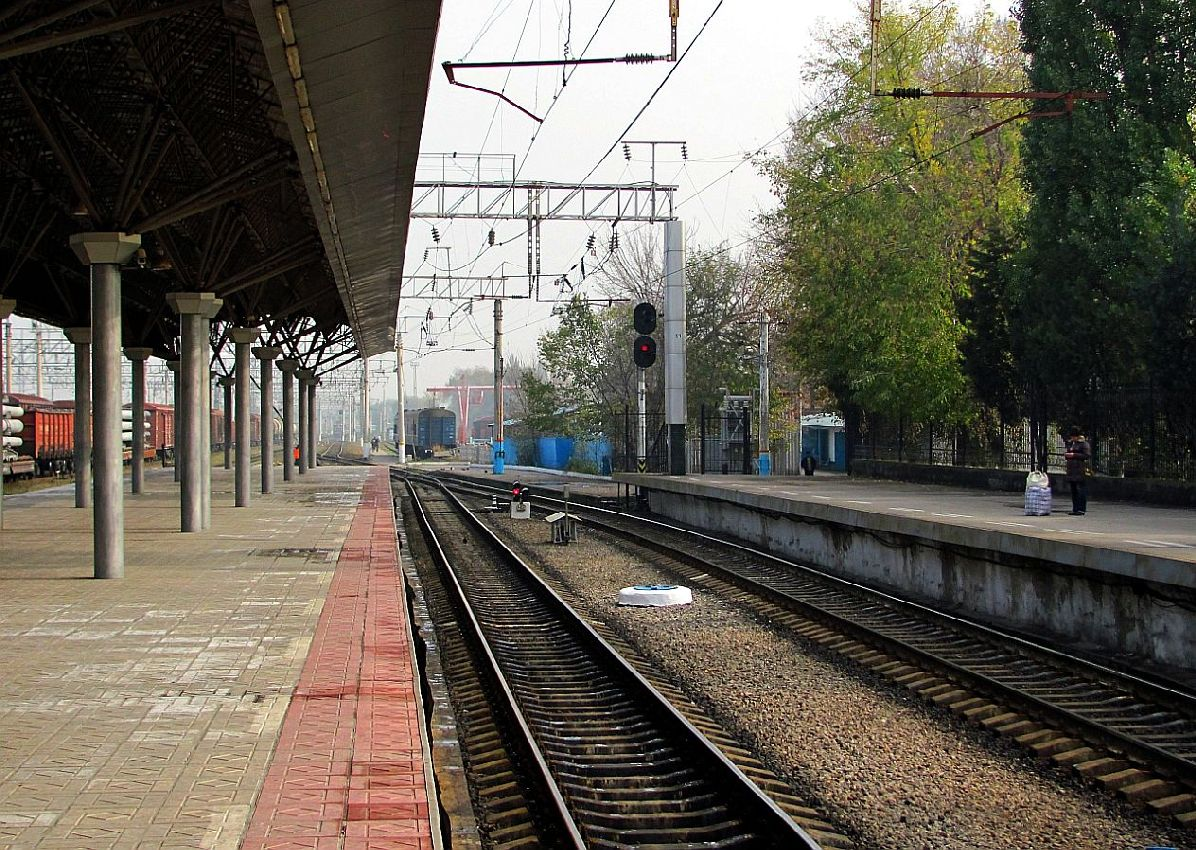
Platform of the station. (between 2007 and 2013 when track No. 3 and overhead wires got raised)

By the late 1960s, the railway infrastructure around Almaty-1 was unable to handle the increased passenger numbers and was in need of upgrades. Construction on such a project was delayed, however, due to the authorities at the time only being allowed to build projects that cost a maximum of one million rubles. In order to spend more than this, local authorities needed to get permission from Moscow, but this would lead to oversight of the project by the central authorities. The State Secretary of Kazakh SSR Dinmukhamed Kunayev raised questions about the project during a state planning commission meeting and in meetings of the central government, which led to a series of plans being studied. Consideration was given to expanding Almaty-2 station, since Almaty-1 was located in a seismically active area. Kunayev and other authorities were against this idea. However, it would create a strong industrial hub in the heart of the city, consequently, it would require the demolition of an entire residential neighborhood. Eventually, Almaty city officials found an architect who proposed a plan for a new Almaty-1 station that would take into account the seismic issues and would increase the strength of the building. This plan was opposed by officials of the USSR State Committee in Moscow, however, who were concerned by the budget for such an expensive project, and the cost of the materials required. Permission was finally granted, with a final cost of two and a half million rubles, and construction of the new station began in the autumn of 1969. When construction was completed, the station was hailed as one of the most modern facilities in the Soviet Union, and seen as a 'ceremonial gate' to Almaty. The terminal building was dedicated on May 20, 1975, when Mustafa Kazybekova, representing the construction company Kazahtransstroy, handed over a symbolic key to the new station's first chief, Rysty Kasenova.

The building was renovated three decades later, with work completed in 2007. Currently, trains depart Almaty-1 heading (via Almaty-2) to Aktobe, Kostanay, Karaganda, Pavlodar and Novosibirsk.

During 2013-2014, track No.3 and overhead wires were raised by around 1 metre to facilitate access with Talgo trains and future bilevel railcars at track No.3.

== Reconstruction ==
According to the plan for the reconstruction of the station, it is planned to clearly delineate the station building into three zones: operating, service and support. The operating area includes a lobby, operating and distribution rooms, a cash register, an information desk, and waiting rooms. The service area includes lockers for hand luggage, rooms for mothers and children, long-term rest rooms for transit passengers, a service center, mini markets, food outlets, trade booths, hairdressing salons, toilets. The support zone includes the offices of the management of the station, station, station attendants, other service and technical premises, a first-aid post, premises for a sanitary control point or a border sanitary quarantine post. For passengers with disabilities, the project provides information devices, sanitary and hygienic facilities for people with limited mobility, a waiting room, a ticket office, elevators, tactile media.

== See also ==
- Almaty-2
