= 1764 in Russia =

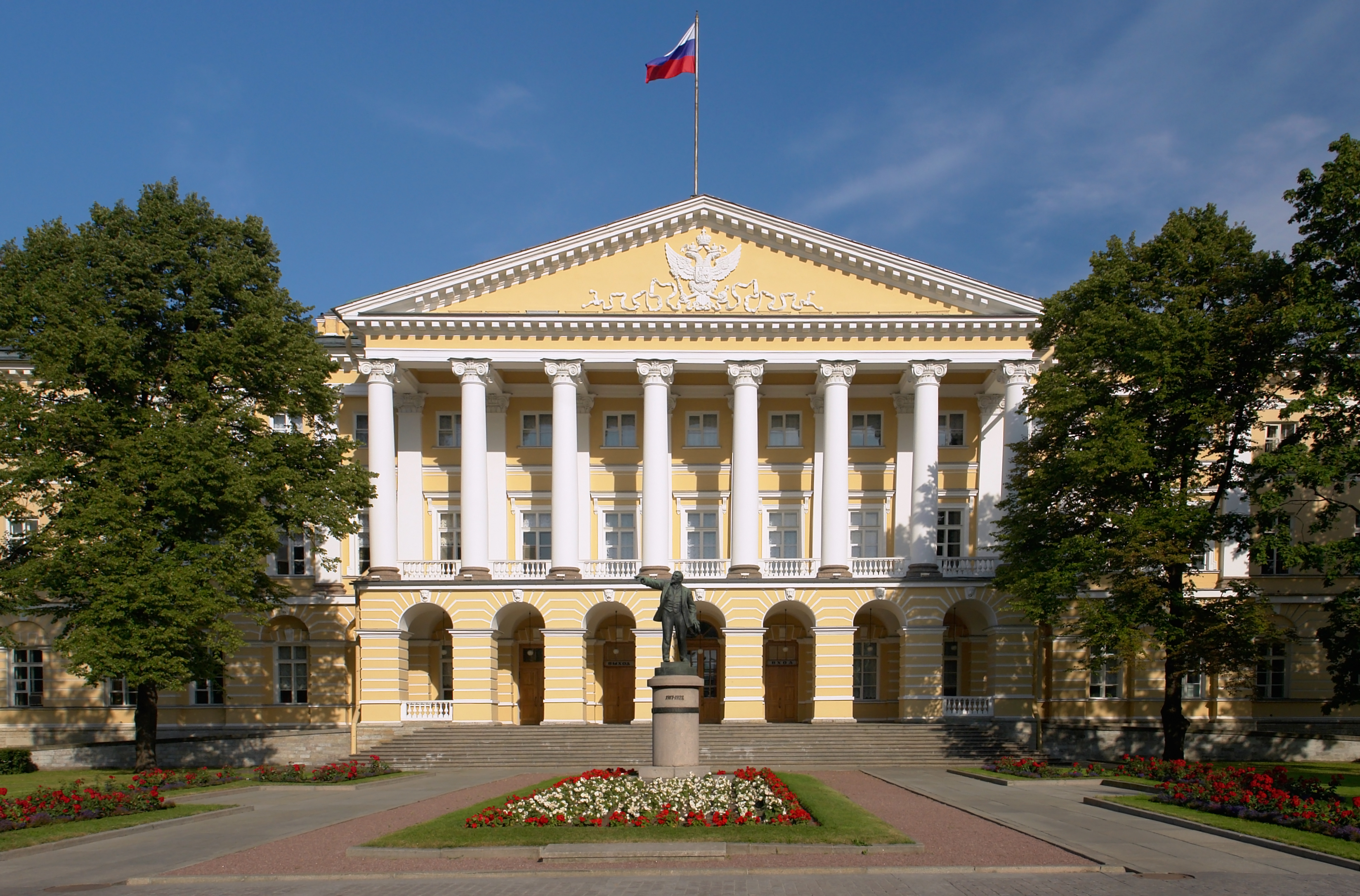
Smolny Institute.

Events from the year 1764 in Russia

== Incumbents ==
- Monarch – Catherine II

== Events ==
- Foundation of the Smolny Institute.

== Deaths ==
- July 16 – Tsar Ivan VI of Russia (murdered in prison) (b. 1740)
