= Boralday (archaeological site) =

Archaeological site in Almaty, Kazakhstan

- Location of Taksai, with contemporary cultures in the 6th century BCE
- Geographical range: South Siberia
- Dates: 600-400 BCE
- Major sites: 43.3370°N 76.8687°E
- Preceded by: Karasuk culture
- Followed by: Aldy-Bel culture, Pazyryk culture, Tagar culture

Boralday (Kazakh: Боралдай), is a kurgan necropolis in Almaty, Kazakhstan, dating to the early Iron Age and associated with the Saka people. Located on the southeastern outskirts of the village of Boralday, the site comprises 47 burial mounds spread over 430 hectares on the left bank of the Bolshaya Almatinka River.

The site was discovered in 1990 and was declared a protected monument in 2010. There are plans to turn the site into a museum.

The complex was first scientifically described and registered by the archaeologist Ageeva in 1956.

== Archaeological Park "Boralday Sak Barrows" ==
On March 28, 2006, the territory occupied by the kurgans was transferred under the jurisdiction of the Museum of Almaty to create a unique open-air museum – Archaeological Park "Borolday Sak Barrows", which should include an archaeological park and ethnopark "Monuments of nomadic architecture and life of the Kazakh people".

In 2016, M. M. Nurpeisov, scientific secretary of the Association of Museums of Almaty, specified that the main direction of development is the idea of an ecopark. It is planned that there will be small groves around, and in the central part of the park, where the mounds themselves are located, the landscape should be preserved as much as possible.

On May 27, 2017, the park hosted a festival of nomadic culture, where visitors could actually see the "Sarmatian Priestess," which was found in the Taksai 1 mound, gold jewelry, and items of Saka culture. Visitors also took part in a subbotnik to beautify the park's territory.

== Necropolis ==
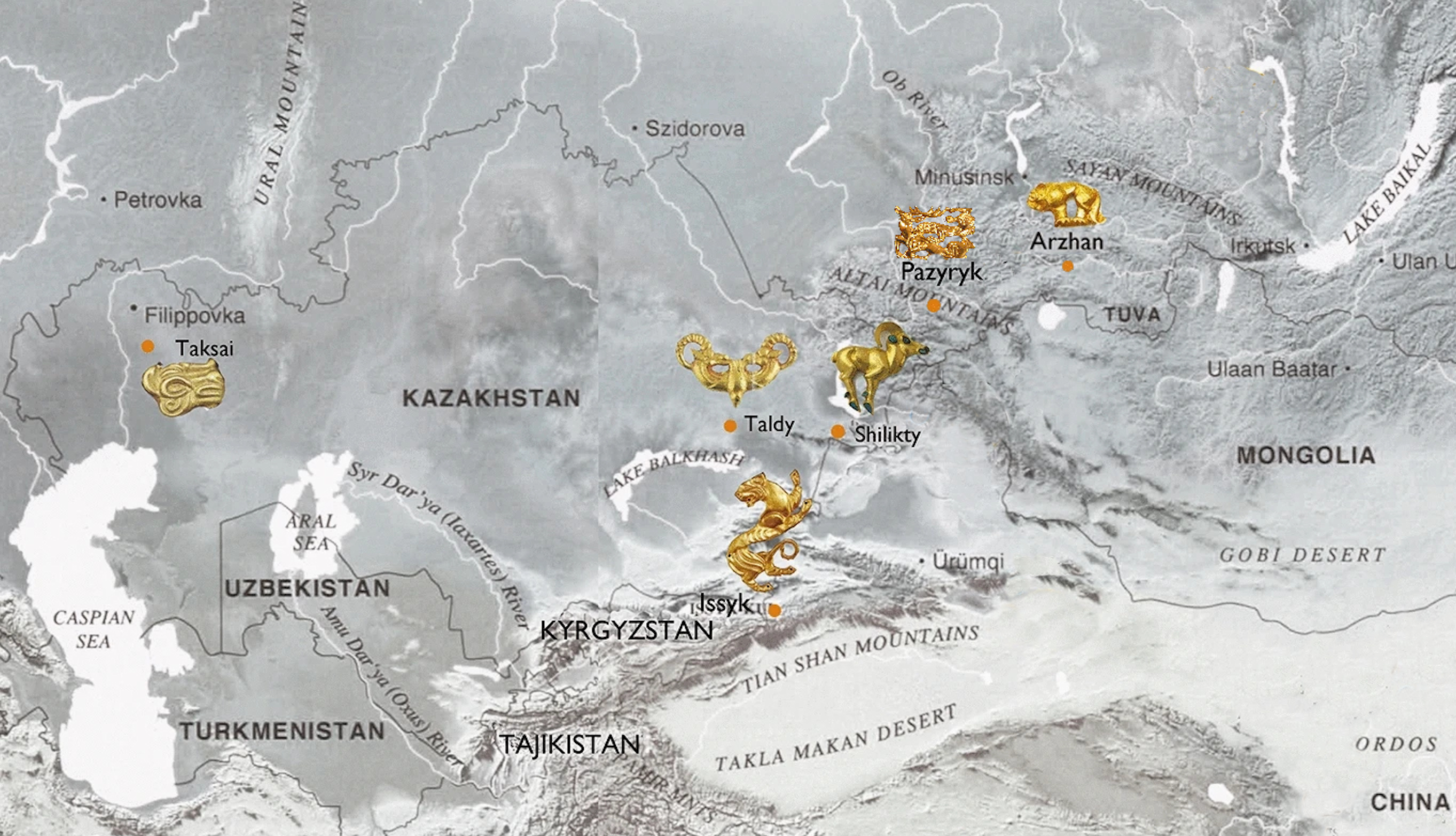
Boralday among other kurgans in Central Asia.

The necropolis comprises 430 hectares and includes 47 mounds from the Saka period from the 5th to the 3rd centuries BC. The necropolis is located in chains in the south–north and South-West-North-East. The burial ground is 3 km long and 800 meters wide. The height of the largest mound, which is located in the center of the necropolis, is 14 meters, and the diameter is 100 meters. There are also several mounds with a height of 5–6 meters and a diameter of 60–80 meters. Medium-sized mounds have a height of 3 meters and a diameter of 30–40 meters, and the small ones have a height of 1–1,5 meters and a diameter of 10–20 meters. The dry climate conditions in the area have preserved and mummified remains, including human remains, clothing, and various objects. A burial area for horses has also been found.

== Monument status ==
On November 10, 2010, a new State List of Historical and Cultural Monuments of Local Significance in Almaty was approved, simultaneously with which all previous decisions on this subject were declared null and void. In this decree, the status of the Boroldai Mounds as a monument of local importance was retained. The boundaries of the protection zones were approved in 2014.
