= Abylai Khan (monument) =

Coordinates: 43°16′22″N 76°56′21″E

Abylai Khan monument
- Памятник Абылай Хану
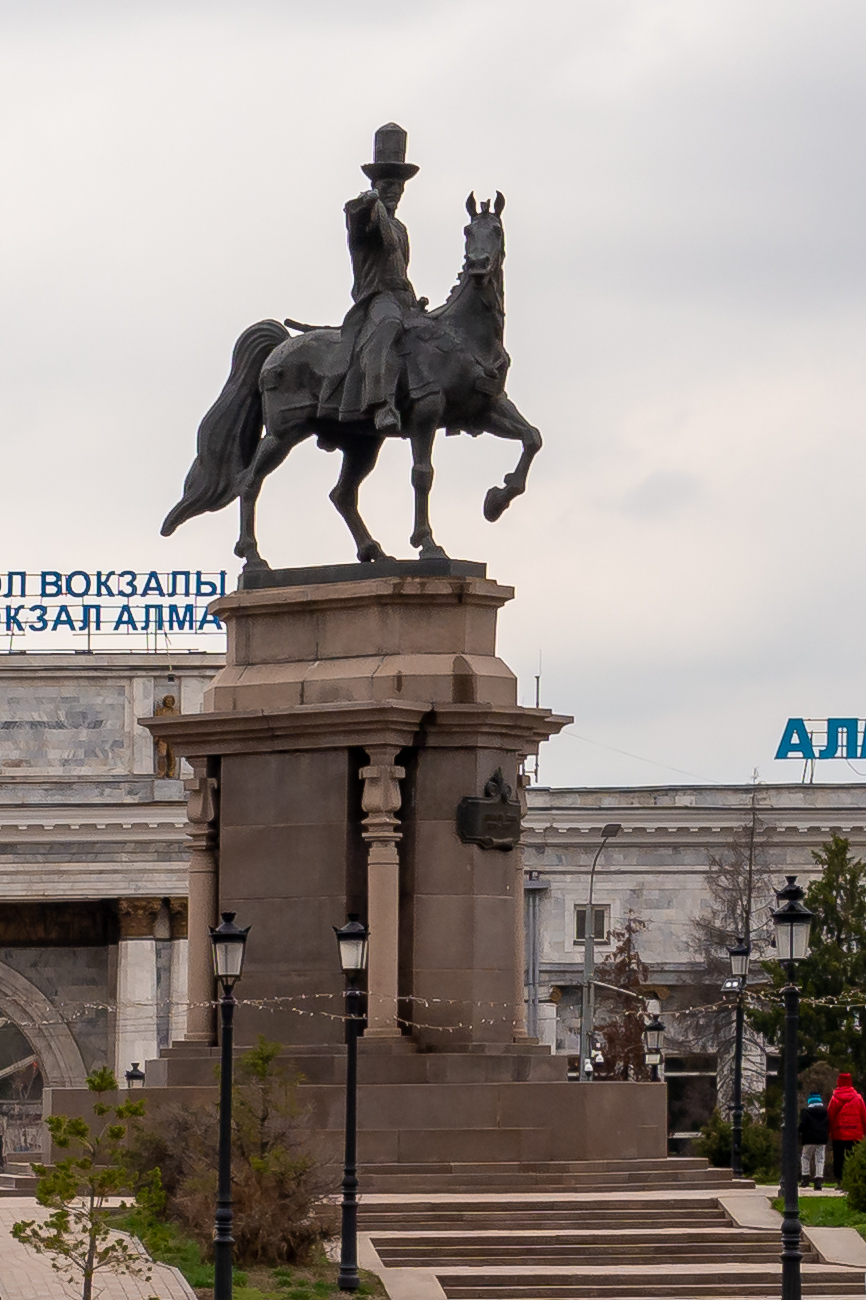
- Interactive map of Abylai Khan monument
- Location: Almaty, Kazakhstan
- Designer: M. E. Erkinov
- Completion date: 2000
- Dedicated to: Abylai Khan

Monument to Abylai Khan in Almaty (Kazakh: Абылай хан ескерткіші, romanized: Abylai han eskertkışı; Russian: Памятник Абылай Хана, tr. pamiatnik abylai khanu) is a monument in Almaty, Kazakhstan, dedicated to the Kazakh statesman, and the 18th-century Khan of Kazakh Khanate Abylai Khan.

== Construction ==
The monument is made out of bronze and was installed at the station square in front of Almaty-2 train station building on 16 December 2000. It was installed on a high tiered octagonal granite pedestal. Four corner columns hold an overhanging cornice, serving as a base for the pedestal of equestrian sculpture.

== Monument authors ==
Those who took part in monument's construction and installation are listed on a granite plaque at the base of the monument:

- Head of the design team - S. K. Baimagambetov
- Sculptor - K. K. Satybaldin
- Architects - T. E. Eraliev, Z. S. Baimagambetov, V. I. Sidorov
- Designer - M.E. Erkinov
- Foundry works - A.V. Volkov

== Monument description ==
The monument itself is cast in bronze, with Abylai Khan seated on a horse, wearing richly decorated clothes and combat gear. In his right hand he holds a rod, which is a symbol of the khan's power. The base of the pedestal of the equestrian sculpture is four angular columns, which hold a hinged cornice. The general feeling of the monument is power, strength and greatness.

== Critique ==
The monument was heavily criticized by sculptors. In particular, the sculptor Nurlan Dalbay spoke about it in the following way: "It doesn't even smell of sculpture. Amateurs like these, who get to win government contracts, can't sculpt, don't understand anything about composition, and don't know the smell of sculpture. Monumental sculpture has its own laws, they learn that at academies. The main task is to insert the object into the urban situation. It should be silhouettically recognizable. Then the details come. That means you know very well human anatomy, the anatomy of a horse. You know composition at least a little bit, in other words you can portray some kind of gesture. And because you don't have that, you get not sculpture, but plasticine little people".
