= Wali Khan =

Wali Khan may refer to:

- Wali Khan (khoja), a Turkestani khoja, ruler of Kashgar in 1857
- Wali Khan Babar (1982–2011), Pakistani journalist
- Wali Khan Amin Shah (born 1967), freedom fighter during the Soviet invasion of Afghanistan and a convicted terrorist
- Ahmad Wali Khan Karzai (1961–2011), Afghan politician, brother of president Karzai
- Asfandyar Wali Khan (born 1949), son of Khan Abdul Wali Khan, a Pakistani politician
- Khan Abdul Wali Khan (1917–2006), Pashtun Pakistani politician
- Mufti Zar Wali Khan (1953–2020), a Pakistani Muslim cleric

== See also ==
- Shokan Walikhanuli (1835–1865), Kazakh scholar and traveller
