= Boralday =

Boralday Боралдай
- settlement
- Location in Kazakhstan
- Coordinates: 43°21′37″N 76°51′28″E
- Country: Kazakhstan
- Region: Almaty Region
- District: Ile District

Population (2009)
  - Total: 27,188
- Time zone: UTC+6 (Omsk Time)

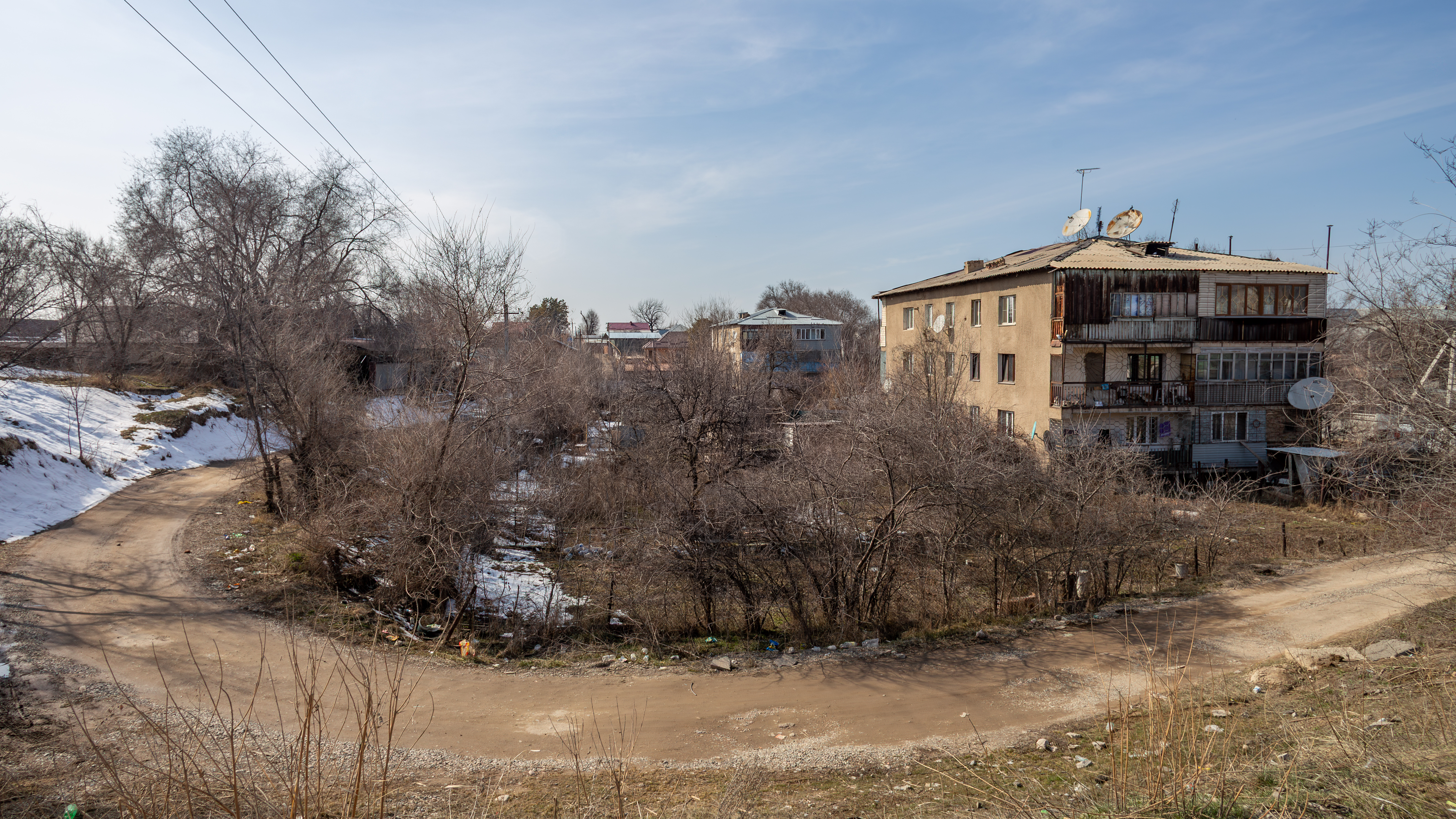
Cheryomushki microdistrict. Boraldai, Almaty Region, Kazakhstan.

Boralday (Kazakh: Боралдай, Boraldai) is a town located some 5 kilometres to the north of Almaty in Almaty Region of south-eastern Kazakhstan. Boraldai Airport is located in the southeast part of the town. It is connected by road to Chemolgan.

An Iron Age kurgan necropolis, also called Boralday, is located on the outskirts of the village.

The climate in Boralday is described as humid continental with a hot summer. The temperature in Boralday is warmest during July. On average the temperature can reach up to 30 °C (86 °F). The coldest month in Boraldy is January reaching as low as −8 °C (18 °F).
