= Ablai Khan =

Khan of the Kazakh Khanate (1711-1781)

Abylai Khan
- Khan of the Three Kazakh Jüzes
- Fantasy image on a postage stamp of Kazakhstan, 2000

Khan of the Kazakh Khanate
- Reign: 1771–1781
- Coronation: 1771

Khan of the Middle Zhuz
- Reign: 1768–1781
- Predecessor: Abilmambet Khan
- Successor: Wali Khan
- Born: May 23, 1711; Turkistan, Kazakh Khanate
- Died: May 23, 1781 (aged 70); Tashkent, Kazakh Khanate
- Spouse: Ruhani Daulet Begum
- Issue: Wali Khan; Kasym Sultan; Suyuk Sultan; Adil Sultan (there were 30 sons in total)
Names
- ولی الله ابو المنصور خان; Wāli-ūllah Abū'l-Mansūr Khan
- House: House of Borjigin
- Dynasty: Tore; House of Urus Khan
- Father: Korkem Wali Sultan
- Mother: Jazira Begum
- Religion: Sunni Islam

Wāli-ūllah Abū'l-Mansūr Khan (Kazakh: ولی الله ابو المنصور خان, Уәлиұллаh Әбілмансұр хан, romanized: Uäliūllah Äbılmansūr Han), better known as Abylai Khan or Ablai Khan (May 23, 1711 — May 23, 1781) was Khan of the Middle Jüz (central region) and was the last independent Kazakh Khan of the Kazakh Khanate before the Khanate was absorbed into the Russian Empire.

Ablai Khan played an important role in the historiography of the Kazakhstan and the history of the Kazakh people. He led the Kazakh–Dzungar Wars, heading the Kazakh struggle against the Dzungars and later against the forces of the Qing dynasty. Seeking to unite the fragmented Kazakh tribes into a single political entity, he was among the first to voluntarily recognize the suzerainty of the Russian Empire and compelled many Central Asian powers to reckon with him.

The most powerful of the eighteenth-century khans was Ablai, the khan of the Middle Horde

— Vasily Bartold

Assessments of Ablai Khan’s personality vary widely. Some portray him as a cunning barbarian whose “trickery and resourcefulness” were unmatched, while others idealize and admire his political and military activities. In Soviet and Chinese publications, the subject of Ablai Khan has often been heavily politicized.

== Early life and rise to power ==
Born as Waliullah Abu'l-Mansur, Abylai Khan belonged to the senior branch of descendants of the 15th century founder of the Kazakh state, Janybek Khan. The son of Korkem Wali Sultan, he was given the shortened name Abulmansur at birth. Abulmansur spent his childhood and part of his youth in exile, spending many years near present-day Burabay on the northern borders of the Kazakh Khanate. After losing his father to political rivals at the age of thirteen, Abulmansur moved back south towards present-day Kyzylorda. First, he worked as a shepherd in a noble Tole Bi and then Dauletgeldi Bai a herdsman. The ill-dressed and emaciated boy was called by the contemptuous name of "Sabalak" - the beggar. But Abulmansur, according to contemporaries, always carried himself with dignity and loved solitude. He kept this pen name "Sabalak" in order not to be noticed by his father's rivals as he was one of the descendant of Janybek Khan.

Ablai began fighting at the age of fifteen as part of the Kazakh militia against the Dzungars, during the Kazakh–Dzungar War (1723–1729). This period in the history of Kazakhstan is widely regarded as one of the most devastating in the country's past, (see Years of the Great Disaster). According to Shoqan Walikhanov:

"During this terrible and bloody time, Sultan Ablai attracted universal attention. Taking part in every campaign, initially as an ordinary warrior, he displayed extraordinary courage. His valuable advice and strategic insight earned him the reputation of a wise man."

Some information about Ablai's youth is preserved in the zhyr composed by Umbetei Zhyrau upon the death of the batyr Bogenbai. As noted by Kazakh literary scholars, the poem focuses more on Ablai than on Bogenbai himself. In informing the khan of the death of one of the most celebrated batyrs, Umbetei begins his narrative with Ablai's childhood and early years.

When you reached the age of twenty,
The Kalmyks (Dzungars) fled from the Kazakh steppe.
In that war you tasted the joy of your first victories,
And your enemies came to know your battle cry.

Bukhar Zhyrau later repeatedly emphasized that Ablai owed his rise to the people, particularly to the warriors who supported him:

When the good people stood behind you,
A former servant who knew not his father
Suddenly became a bey.

Not only noble-born men such as Ablai, Barak, and Abulkhair, but also many ordinary nomads earned the honorary title of batyr through their courage and military prowess. The title of batyr, together with the patronage of Abilmambet Khan, enabled Ablai to be elected leader of the Atygai clan of the Argyn tribe. The exact date of this appointment is unknown. Soviet historians Ramazan Suleimenov and Vladimir Moiseev suggested that it occurred in the late 1720s or early 1730s. In any case, by the time the Junior Juz accepted the Russian protectorate, Ablai already ruled over several thousand nomadic households.

== Captivity in Dzungaria ==
In late February 1741, an Oirat army under the command of Septen invaded the Middle Jüz, advancing through heavy fighting as far as the Tobol and Ishim rivers. Military operations continued until the summer. Reporting on the campaign, the Dzungar commander stated:

"I returned safely with the army to Zungharia, bringing captives from those lands... Together with me, Septen, there were three thousand male and female captives from the Kazakh Horde and the Torguts (Volga Kalmyks who had been held captive by the Kazakhs), though all the adult males were put to death, and only the younger boys were spared. This winter and spring I campaigned with the army on the Oboto and Tobol rivers."

During the campaign, Ablai and several of his companions were captured. While commanding a reconnaissance detachment of 200 men, Ablai charged directly into the main Dzungar force. Surrounded by a vastly superior enemy army, the Kazakhs were taken prisoner. Shortly afterwards, Barak's detachment was also defeated, and Sultan Durgun together with the batyrs Atykmysh and Kobtugan were captured and taken to Dzungaria. Sultan Ablai and his relatives were held at the headquarters of Galdan Tseren under the supervision of the noyan Dawachi, where he also became acquainted with the Khoit noyan Amursana. During his years in captivity, Ablai learned the Oirat language and script and gained a thorough understanding of the internal situation of the Dzungar Khanate. According to Soviet historians, he also came to the firm conclusion that the strength of the Dzungar Khanate lay in its unity and strong centralized authority.

During the negotiations, Galdan Tseren sought to secure the submission of the Middle Jüz, and even the Junior Jüz, to his authority. To exert pressure, he employed various means, including the issue of prisoner exchanges, particularly that of Ablai. For example, when a Kazakh embassy arrived, the Dzungar Khong Tayiji ordered that Ablai's hands and feet be shackled, and "throughout Akchura's entire stay he remained in chains," in an effort to compel the Kazakh rulers to make concessions and secure Ablai's release. After the departure of the Kazakh envoys, Ablai was once again given a separate yurt, and his freedom of movement was restricted only by the presence of guards. Among both the Kazakhs and the Dzungars, the exchange of prisoners after military conflicts was a long-established custom.

According to Kazakh oral tradition, Ablai killed one of Galdan Tseren's favourite sons, although Galdan Tseren in fact had no son fitting this description. Nevertheless, Ablai did kill a prominent Dzungar prince in single combat during one of the battles. Thus, when the Dzungar envoys Kashka and Barang accompanied Abulkhair to the head of the Orenburg Commission, they responded to demands for Ablai's release by declaring:

"He killed one of our noblemen, a relative of Galdan Tseren, and for that reason he has been detained longer; however, he is being treated with every honour. Moreover, several daughters of distinguished Dzungars have fallen into the hands of the Kazakhs, and if they are returned, then it is likely that he too will be released."

Ablai remained in captivity until 1743. Only after another hostage, Sultan Abulfayiz, arrived was he released. Reporting this to the College of Foreign Affairs, Ivan Neplyuyev of the Orenburg Commission wrote that "the Kazakh captive Ablai Sultan and those with him have been released... and I, the Privy Councillor, believe that Galdan Tseren granted this release in order to demonstrate the moderation and leniency with which he wishes to keep the Kazakhs under his protection, believing that by such a policy, rather than by military force, he will more easily influence and attract that fickle people." Ablai impressed Galdan Tseren not only with his personal bravery but also with his political acumen, foresight, and extraordinary ambition. It was with Galdan Tseren that Ablai concluded a truce between the Kazakh khanates and Dzungaria before returning to his nomadic domains.

Ablai's release from Dzungar captivity was closely connected with the intervention of the Russian government. Deeply concerned by the Oirat offensive against Kazakhstan and by Galdan Tseren's increasing diplomatic pressure on the Kazakh rulers, the Russian government and the Orenburg administration undertook a number of measures to curb Dzungar actions, including dispatching Karl Miller to Urga. One of the principal objectives of the mission was to secure Ablai's release. Although the Russian envoys were not admitted to the Dzungar court, Soviet historians argued that the Russian protest nevertheless influenced Galdan Tseren's policy toward the Kazakhs. Ablai later told the Orenburg commissioners that he was obliged "to pray to God forever" because "through the highest mercy I was graciously freed from captivity under the Kalmyk ruler Galdan Tseren." Ablai later reproached Abilmambet, as khan, and the other Kazakh leaders for having done nothing to secure his release from captivity. After his release, friendly relations developed between Galdan Tseren and Ablai. The Kazakh and Dzungar rulers met each other and exchanged visits. Ablai even moved his nomadic encampments onto lands belonging to the Dzungar Khanate, while Lieutenant F. Ablyazov reported that the Kazakhs were pasturing along the Tsar-Gurban River, which marked the frontier of Dzungaria. These cordial relations continued until the early 1750s. When fierce internal conflicts erupted within the Dzungar Khanate, the Kazakhs became active participants in those events.

== Campaigns in Dzungaria ==
By the late 1740s and early 1750s, the once-powerful Dzungar Khanate had entered a period of accelerating decline. Following the death of Galdan Tseren, a succession struggle broke out in Dzungaria. The throne passed to Galdan Tseren's middle son, who was only thirteen years old. His brief reign was marked by executions, political repression, economic decline, and increasing decentralization. He was eventually overthrown and succeeded by Lama Dorji. From the beginning of his reign, Lama Dorji faced hostility from many leading Dzungar nobles. Among his most formidable opponents was Dawachi, a direct descendant of Batur Khong Tayiji, the founder of the Dzungar Khanate. In the autumn of 1751, Dawachi and his supporters were defeated and fled to Kazakhstan. At first, the refugees were received hospitably. Although the Kazakh elite closely followed developments in Dzungaria, they initially maintained neutrality. However, the arrival of three prominent Dzungar noyons forced them to reconsider their position and determine a common course of action.

Upon learning that Dawachi and Amursana had found refuge with Abilai, the Dzungar khan Lama Dorji dispatched an embassy demanding their immediate extradition. He also appealed to the influential Kazakh elders Malaisary and Yapik, asking them to persuade Abilai to surrender the fugitives so that "discord and unnecessary bloodshed might be avoided." In this situation, Abilai played the decisive role. Before a council of Kazakh elders could be convened, he refrained from making a final decision and replied that he had not summoned the fugitives, but that they had come to him of their own accord. Nevertheless, the Kazakh nomadic camps were subsequently moved northward, closer to the Russian frontier fortresses and farther away from the Dzungar border.

Meanwhile, Dawachi began to attract followers dissatisfied with the new ruler of Dzungaria, who expected him to return to the khanate accompanied by Kazakh forces. By the summer of 1752, about 150 supporters had gathered around him. Initially, the fugitives had intended to travel through Kazakh territory to join the Volga Kalmyks. Gradually, however, the growing number of former subjects wishing to rally around them altered these plans. Dawachi increasingly urged the Kazakh leaders to provide him with a military force for an invasion of Dzungaria. At the same time, another Dzungar embassy arrived demanding the extradition of the fugitives. The envoys were detained until the assembly of the Middle Jüz reached a decision. Representatives of all clans and tribes of the Middle Jüz attended the council, together with delegates from the Junior and Senior Jüzes.

Abilmambet Khan supported handing over the Dzungar nobles, but Abilai believed that his position was motivated by personal interests and the advantages he hoped to gain from cooperation with the Dzungar khan. Abilai's stance was backed by influential tribal leaders and batyrs, including Bogenbay, Dawut Tarkhan, Yapak, and Sultan Eraly of the Junior Jüz, all of whom insisted that Dawachi, Amursana, and Banjur should under no circumstances be surrendered to the Dzungars. Personal friendship also played a role: according to Captain A. Yakovlev, during Abilai's captivity in Dzungaria between 1741 and 1743, he and Dawachi had "pledged friendship" to one another. Abilai was likewise supported by Töle Bi, who opposed the extradition of the Dzungar nobles. This broad support strengthened Abilai's position, and the Dzungar envoys once again returned empty-handed. Abilai subsequently sent an embassy informing Lama Dorji that the fugitives had come voluntarily and therefore could not be surrendered. The Russian government, having learned that the two Dzungar noyons had taken refuge in the Middle Jüz, also decided to intervene actively in the situation and sought to have them transferred into Russian custody. The principal objective of the Kazakhs, however, was to place their own protégé on the Oirat throne. Ablai argued that Dawachi was "the most distinguished noyon" and that, under the circumstances, supporting his claim would be the most advantageous course of action.

In September, a 20,000-strong Oirat army invaded the Kazakh frontier pastures. The Dzungars launched two major offensives, devastating many Naiman, Kerei, and other Kazakh clans, taking numerous captives. They also seized several tribal leaders and demanded their exchange for Dawachi, Amursana, and Amursana's brother. Upon learning of the invasion, Ablai sent messengers throughout the steppe calling on the Kazakh forces to assemble at Bayan-Aul. Despite the Dzungar offensive, Ablai and his supporters initially sought a peaceful resolution and hoped to preserve the agreements that had existed during the reign of Galdan Tseren. At the same time, attitudes toward Dawachi among the Kazakhs began to change. The invasion of Kazakh territory, together with Dawachi's unsuccessful attempt to transfer his ulus into the Middle Jüz, undermined the confidence that Ablai and other Kazakh leaders had placed in him. The commanders of the Kazakh militia increasingly favoured surrendering the fugitives, provided they received guarantees that they would be "received with good intentions, that his uluses would be restored to him, and that he would be treated as a ruler rather than put to death." Aware of these changing attitudes, Dawachi and his followers kept their distance from the Kazakh army.

During the autumn and winter of 1752, fighting between the Oirat army and the Kazakh militia continued with mixed results. However, the strategic advantage gradually shifted in favour of the Kazakhs, and reports began to circulate of Dzungar defeats. Ablai hoped to carry the war into Dzungarian territory. Despite these setbacks, Lama Dorji rejected all of Ablai's proposals for peace negotiations. Ablai dispatched envoys, but the embassy was intercepted: one envoy was killed, while the other was detained and forced to guide the Dzungars to Kazakh encampments. At the same time, Kazakh and Oirat interests increasingly clashed in Central Asia. Both sides sought to establish supremacy over the nomadic and settled peoples living along the Syr Darya, including the Karakalpaks. Lama Dorji sent envoys to the Karakalpaks to announce their "punishment" for "disobedience" and to persuade them to resettle in Dzungaria. The Karakalpaks had suffered heavily from repeated Kazakh raids, and according to information obtained by the Senior Jüz, only about 3,000 Karakalpak families remained. Although the Karakalpak rulers initially agreed to Lama Dorji's proposal, they changed their minds at the last moment and appealed to the Kazakh rulers for assistance. Kazakh detachments under Kabanbai Batyr and Khanbaba, the son of Sultan Barak, were immediately dispatched to their aid.

Having committed the bulk of his forces to the campaign in Kazakhstan, Lama Dorji left his headquarters poorly defended, an opportunity that his rivals quickly exploited. Dawachi and Amursana launched a surprise raid from Kazakh territory with a force of 600 warriors and successfully seized power. Following these events, Dawachi became khan of Dzungaria. Kazakh–Oirat relations entered a new phase, characterized by increasingly active Kazakh involvement in the Oirat civil wars. After assuming power, Dawachi withdrew his troops from Kazakhstan and sent messages to Abilmambet and Ablai proposing peaceful relations. Ablai likewise sent a letter expressing his desire to maintain the friendly ties that had existed previously. The overthrow of Lama Dorji, however, did not bring an end to the civil conflict in Dzungaria. Lama Dorji fled to Amursana, who attempted to exploit the situation by demanding half of the khanate, only to receive a categorical refusal. Ablai and the Kazakh elders supported both Dawachi and Amursana. On 23 December 1753, the headman of the Naiman volosts informed a Russian ensign that the Kazakhs had gone "to render assistance, defeated many Kalmyk uluses... and Sultan Ablai himself joined that expedition."

In the autumn of 1753, Kazakh detachments numbering about 5,000 men were operating in Dzungaria. Their principal attacks were directed against the Derbets. The Bargat *otok*, belonging to Dzungar princes, was also destroyed. Documentary evidence indicates that Abilai and Dawachi had concluded an agreement on joint military operations. Oirat prisoners captured by the Kazakhs were handed over to Dawachi. Men from the Derbet otoks (territorial unit) were delivered to him, while the women and children were distributed among the Kazakh leaders. These accounts are corroborated by Balchuk, the headman of a Kerei volost, who personally took part in the campaign. According to the available sources, Dawachi received the greater part of the captured livestock. During the winter of 1753–1754, another Kazakh militia force again marched into Dzungaria.

At the same time, other Dzungar noyons, including Amursana and Nemekhu-Jirgali, also began to resist Dawachi. Having expanded the number of their followers to approximately 7,000 households, they openly challenged his authority. Amursana's envoys appealed to Abilai for assistance, requesting 20,000 sheep and as many camels as possible in return for future payment. Abilai agreed to provide the requested aid, and the Khoit noyon subsequently revealed his plans and invited his allies to join him. It remains unclear whether these developments prompted Abilai and the other Kazakh leaders to abandon their alliance with Dawachi, thereby bringing the Dzungar Khanate and the Middle Jüz to the brink of war. It can, however, be concluded that the parties reached an understanding regarding the future relationship between the Dzungar Khanate and the Kazakh jüzes.

In the autumn of 1753, Kazakh detachments numbering about 5,000 men were operating in Dzungaria. Their principal attacks were directed against the Derbets. The Bargat otok, belonging to Dzungar princes, was also destroyed. Documentary evidence indicates that Ablai and Dawachi had concluded an agreement on joint military operations. Oirat prisoners captured by the Kazakhs were handed over to Dawachi. Men from the Derbet otoks were delivered to him, while the women and children were distributed among the Kazakh leaders. These accounts are corroborated by Balchuk, the headman of a Kerei volost, who personally took part in the campaign. According to the available sources, Dawachi received the greater part of the captured livestock. During the winter of 1753–1754, another Kazakh militia force again marched into Dzungaria.

At the same time, other Dzungar noyans, including Amursana and Nemekhu-Jirgali, also began to resist Dawachi. Having expanded the number of their followers to approximately 7,000 households, they openly challenged his authority. Amursana's envoys appealed to Ablai for assistance, requesting 20,000 sheep and as many camels as possible in return for future payment. Ablai agreed to provide the requested aid, and the Khoit noyon subsequently revealed his plans and invited his allies to join him. It remains unclear whether these developments prompted Ablai and the other Kazakh leaders to abandon their alliance with Dawachi, thereby bringing the Dzungar Khanate and the Middle Jüz to the brink of war. It can, however, be concluded that the parties reached an understanding regarding the future relationship between the Dzungar Khanate and the Kazakh jüzes.

The first joint campaign undertaken by the Kazakh militia and the forces allied with Amursana ended in defeat. Poor coordination between the allied forces, combined with Dawachi's numerical superiority, forced Abilai's troops to retreat. The Oirat Lazun Sanchikov informed Sergeant Stepan Myakinin that in April 1754 a Kazakh force of approximately 1,700 men unexpectedly appeared near the Karatal River. According to Soviet historians, this defeat proved to be of considerable importance for subsequent events.

Ablai's support for Amursana prompted Dawachi to send a large embassy to the Middle Jüz demanding the return of all captured property and an end to Kazakh military incursions. Speaking on Dawachi's behalf, one of the envoys declared:

"Why have you, Ablai, brought such utter devastation upon the people of my Dzungar dominion? Until now I have always lived with you in brotherly friendship and never expected such insolence and plundering from you. Together with Amursana you have attacked my subjects, carrying off many men and women, horses, cattle, yurts, and property. I ask that all of this be returned to me without further quarrel. Otherwise, I shall send part of my army against you in war."

Ablai dismissed the envoys without giving any reply.

In July–August 1754, Ablai launched another campaign into Dzungaria. Dawachi's diplomatic efforts to restore friendly relations with Ablai proved unsuccessful. Although Ablai achieved a military success, it was no longer sufficient to save Amursana from defeat. Pursued by Oirat and Uriankhai forces, Amursana fled to Qing China with only a small retinue. Ablai, meanwhile, prepared for further incursions into Dzungaria. Having eliminated Amursana as a threat, Dawachi planned to strike at Ablai's nomadic encampments, where the noyon Erinchin had also taken refuge. At the same time, Dawachi intended to request military assistance from the Russian government in his struggle against the Kazakhs. The onset of winter, together with another outbreak of civil conflict, forced the Dzungar khan to withdraw his troops. Many Dzungar noyons and zaisangs spent the winter in the upper Ili valley, fearing another Kazakh invasion. However, a new and far more formidable enemy was already advancing from the east—one against whom the Oirat state proved powerless—as the Qing Empire began its conquest of Dzungaria.

The repeated incursions of the Kazakh forces severely disrupted the economy of the Dzungar Khanate and encouraged continued revolts by various Dzungar nobles against the central government. The Uyghur merchant Ishtamir Baloyarov reported to Sergeant Myakinin that in Dzungaria "everyone has been ruined, some have fallen into extreme poverty and have no food even for a single day. Theft has become widespread, people have grown unruly, no longer fearing the zaisangs or noyans, each man makes himself a chief, and they destroy one another... the whole country has fallen into disorder."

According to Vladimir Moiseev, the conflict that began in 1752 stemmed from the efforts of a group of Kazakh leaders, particularly Ablai and Töle Bi, to place their own candidates on the Dzungar throne first Dawachi and later Amursana. Attempts by the Russian authorities to remain uninvolved in the conflict likewise proved unsuccessful. According to him, "Such was the situation in Dzungaria on the eve of the Qing invasion. It would probably not be an exaggeration to say that the active involvement of the Kazakh rulers in the internecine struggles among the Oirat princes contributed to the decline and ultimate destruction of the Dzungar Khanate."

== Kazakh–Qing Conflicts ==
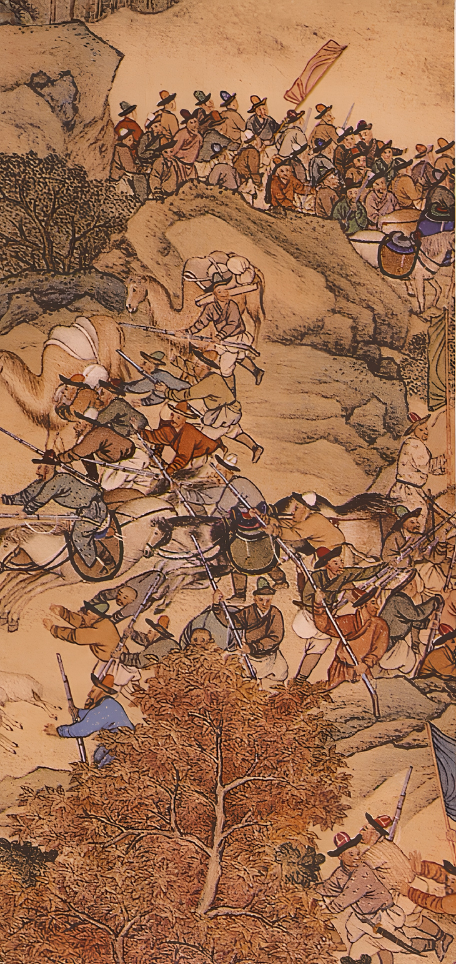
Battle between the troops of the Qing Emperor Qianlong and the Kazakhs. By Giuseppe Castiglione

In early spring 1755, a large Qing army numbering approximately 200,000 soldiers invaded the territory of the Dzungar Khanate. By the summer of the same year, Qing forces had completed the conquest of Dzungaria. Following the fall of the khanate, the Oirat noyon Amursana led a national liberation movement against Qing rule. However, not all Oirat nobles were prepared to recognize his authority, which resulted in internal conflicts among the Oirats.

Abandoned by many of his supporters and commanding only about two hundred warriors, Amursana sought refuge in the nomadic camps of Sultan Ablai. The Qing court was then faced with the question of how to deal with the Kazakh khanates and how to compel Kazakh rulers to cease supporting the liberation movement of the Turkic and Mongolic peoples of Central Asia. During this period, political contacts were established between the Middle Jüz and the Qing Empire.

While preparing for a large-scale war against Dzungaria, Qing China closely monitored the contenders for the Dzungar throne. Qing agents and Oirat defectors were well informed about the role of the Kazakh rulers, particularly Sultan Ablai, who conducted campaigns into Dzungaria throughout the winter and spring of 1755.

After the defeat of Dawachi and his flight to Eastern Turkestan, as well as the elimination of the Dzungar Khanate as a political entity, the emperor ordered his commanders to consider two possible solutions to the "Kazakh question".

- To use diplomatic means to persuade Kazakh detachments to withdraw from Dzungaria.
- To secure recognition from the Kazakhs of the suzerainty of the Manchu Emperor, and, in case of resistance, to employ Qing military forces against the Kazakh warriors.

Ablai refused to comply with this ultimatum and marched against the Qing forces at the head of the Middle Jüz militia, supported by a detachment from the Junior Jüz commanded by Sultan Eraly.

Chinese sources, based on reports from Qing commanders and written with the aim of presenting events favourably, described victories by Manchu-Chinese forces and the capture of Kazakh warriors. According to Russian sources, however, the summer campaign was characterized by fluctuating fortunes. At the Ayaguz River, for example, the Kazakh army inflicted several severe defeats on Qing forces. Nevertheless, the overwhelming numerical superiority of the Qing army, combined with the reluctance of other Kazakh rulers and elders to continue the war against the invaders, forced Ablai, Eraly, and other leaders of Kazakh resistance to withdraw. Ablai was also wounded. In August 1756, a battle took place between Ablai's militia and a combined Qing-Dzungar force, ending in a Kazakh defeat. Afterwards, the Kazakhs were forced to request permission to move their livestock and families behind the line of Russian fortifications.

From the summer of 1756 until the middle of 1757, intense and bloody battles took place between Kazakh detachments and the large Qing armies in the northeastern regions of Central Asia and in Semirechye. According to L. A. Bobrov, the military actions against the Qing armies in 1755–1758 cannot be considered a conventional Dzungar–Qing War. On the one hand, many Dzungars themselves fought on the Qing side; on the other hand, Kazakh militias sent by Ablai, an ally of Amursana, increasingly played an important role among Amursana's forces, and in some cases the number of Kazakh warriors even exceeded that of the Oirats. Initially, the forces of the rebels and the Qing Empire were vastly unequal. Nevertheless, the Dzungars and Kazakhs inflicted several crushing defeats on Qing troops. Angered by the fierce resistance of the recently conquered population, Qing authorities resorted to genocide—the mass extermination of the Dzungars—in which hundreds of thousands of Oirats perished.

In the summer of 1757, due to the enemy's overwhelming numerical and technological superiority, Ablai was forced to end military operations and begin negotiations with Qing commanders in order to establish peace and develop relations with the new southeastern neighbour.

In the autumn of 1757, a Kazakh embassy arrived in China. The Khalkha interpreter F. Shamin reported upon his return:

"From the Kazakh Horde, envoys are going to Beijing with a request that they be forgiven for having, through ignorance, killed a considerable number of Chinese troops in two battles, since previously they had no quarrel or war with the Chinese."

According to the Russian historian Alexei Levshin, some Kazakhs arriving at the Russian border claimed that Ablai Khan spoke Chinese. The arrival of the Kazakh embassy and the presentation of gifts to the emperor—traditional diplomatic practices—were interpreted by the Qing Empire as a desire by Ablai and other Kazakh leaders to acknowledge Qing suzerainty. In accordance with the Sinocentric principles that dominated imperial China's foreign policy, which theoretically did not recognize equal relations between China and other states, the Manchu court immediately classified Ablai among the emperor's new vassals. The gifts sent by him were recorded as "tribute" in the imperial chronicle of events, the Shilu.

== Campaigns in Kyrgyzstan Kokand ==
Relations between the Senior and Middle Jüzes and their southern neighbours, the Kyrgyz, were complex. During periods of devastating invasions by foreign conquerors, Kazakhs and Kyrgyz often united against common enemies. However, after the disappearance of the Qing threat, conflicts once again emerged between individual Kazakh and Kyrgyz tribal leaders.

In 1759, the Middle Jüz sultans Abulfayiz and Khanbaba launched a campaign against the Kyrgyz Teyit tribe with a force of approximately 15,000 warriors. According to reports submitted by the Kazakhs to the Russian authorities, the cause of the campaign was that the Kyrgyz had been raiding Kazakh livestock and obstructing trade with the Qing Empire and the Central Asian khanates. The Kazakh sultans undertook the campaign in order to bring the Kyrgyz under their authority and to obtain amanats (hostages) as a guarantee of loyalty.

In October 1765, Ablai Sultan launched a military campaign. Many Kazakh elders urged Ablai to resolve the disputes with the Kyrgyz through peaceful means and avoid a war with such a powerful opponent. Ablai succeeded in taking nine children of the elders of the Talas Kyrgyz as amanats (hostages). Following Ablai's successful campaign, a temporary period of calm was established between the Kazakhs and Kyrgyz.

Soon after the campaign against the Kyrgyz, Ablai turned against his former ally — the Kokand ruler Irdana. The cause of the conflict was the struggle for control over important trade routes in the region. Ablai sent a reconnaissance detachment of 300 warriors under the command of his adopted son Buri Sultan. However, the numerically superior Kokand forces surrounded the detachment and captured it. Ablai failed to rescue his men. Internal disagreements then broke out in his camp, caused by disputes over the division of captured booty. After keeping the detachment for two months, Abdurrahman released all the prisoners without causing them any harm.

Later, the Kazakhs told representatives of the Russian imperial administration that Ablai had not come to Buri Sultan’s aid because he had almost no army left. This was explained by the fact that he had not rewarded the Kazakhs who had accompanied him for the gifts obtained during raids on the nomadic camps of Baldybek. Offended by this, they divided the remaining prisoners among themselves and returned to their own uluses, effectively leaving Ablai without support. According to other accounts, the reason for their inaction was the fear that a war with the Kokand Khanate would negatively affect trade with Central Asia. Many elders who had previously participated in the campaign against the Kyrgyz refused to support Ablai, stating that if war began, merchants from Tashkent would stop coming for trade exchanges.

I ask peace of the Supreme Ejen, Sacred Khan. I send you a letter to clarify the circumstances of the war from the year before last. Originally, our Kazakh is composed of three tribes: Senior Zhuz, Middle Zhuz, and Junior Zhuz. The two tribes of the Buruts and Irdana, in cooperation with each other, plundered our Senior Zhuz. We also sent our troops and plundered the Buruts the year before last. After that, we dispatched negotiators to pursue reconciliation. There is a proverb of the Muslims in Bukhara, Samarqand, and the surrounding towns that ‘All persons who talk can reach harmony’; however, Irdana still attacked us. All of us are the descendants of the three sons of Janibek khan. Two of their descendants were living in Tashkent and Pishkent. In the past year, Irdana killed a khan named Iskandar, who was my sworn brother, living in Pishkent. Moreover, Irdana killed Iskandar’s two younger brothers and four sons and took his sons’ wives prisoners. He cut open the belly of the pregnant wife of Iskandar and killed his children. He occupied the pasture land. They committed such sins. In addition, some of the Oyirads, who had followed Khwaja Jahan and were overthrown by you before, escaped and now follow Irdana. Irdana also recruited a small number of the escaped Burut. For these reasons, we went to subdue them. Because they made a sally before us, we killed their chief named Bazarci Batur at the very beginning, and [after that] killed many people. After being defeated by us, Irdana entered Pishkent Castle and has not come out. Although we want to seize Pishkent Castle, we have no cannon. Although we want to attack, he never comes out. If we say that it is impregnable, our surrendered pastures would not know peace. For these reasons, we request two thousand troops and cannons from the Supreme Great Ejen.

Finding himself in an extremely difficult situation, Ablai did not abandon resistance. Moving to the Kazakh nomadic camps near Tashkent, he gathered several hundred warriors and advanced against the army of Irdana Biy. However, the battle ended in defeat. Ablai was seriously wounded struck in the side and back and would have died if not for his chainmail and protective clothing, which softened the blows. Realizing that his forces were exhausted, he retreated and settled near Turkestan, at a place near a stone known as Karatau. After Ablai decided to turn to diplomatic methods. He began secret negotiations with influential elders connected with the rulers of Tashkent, offering them a peace agreement. The elders, unaware of Ablai’s recent defeat, sent an embassy to him with rich gifts. However, Ablai took the envoys prisoner and marched with his army into their lands, which he subsequently devastated. The captured booty was sent to his nomadic camps under the protection of his son Wali.

According to the testimony of several Oirats questioned by the Qing authorities in Ili Valley after returning from the Kazakh Steppe, Ablai's war against Kokand in 1766–1767 had reached a stalemate. They reported that the Kazakhs excelled in cavalry warfare, whereas the Kokand's forces were skilled in siege warfare, preventing either side from achieving a decisive victory.

Ablai also demanded the extradition of a local ruler named Bayastan, who had allegedly refused to pay him tribute and had taken refuge in Tashkent. The local governor Mulla Samsi helped Bayastan escape. In response, Ablai ordered the execution of Mulla Samsi, seized his family, and once again sent envoys to Irdana Biy. After receiving a refusal, Ablai attacked the Kyrgyz again without waiting for the return of the next embassy, and this time achieved victory.

No major battles took place between Ablai’s forces and the Kokand troops. Sources indicate that the rulers of the cities preferred to buy off the attackers with valuable gifts gold, silver, and other goods in order to avoid destruction. After receiving tribute, Ablai moved on without causing further harm to them.

After collecting tribute from Tashkent, Ablai sent envoys to the Kokand ruler Irdan Beg. He proposed returning several disputed cities in order to remove the cause of the conflict. However, Irdana Biy rejected the proposal and put forward his own conditions he demanded that Ablai personally come to Kokand for negotiations or send his son and Sultan Abulfayiz as hostages. Ablai rejected these conditions. At the same time, difficulties arose within his own army. The elders accompanying him learned about the rich gifts received from the cities and demanded their share of the spoils. When Ablai refused to divide them, they declared that they would not support him in a possible war and began preparing to return home.

In 1767, Ablai resumed military operations, and the population of Tashkent agreed to recognize his authority and pay tribute. Although an envoy from Irdana Biy arrived expressing submission, Ablai again sent a delegation to China seeking support, while simultaneously spreading rumours that the Qing court had approved his actions. However, these rumours proved unfounded, and the Qing court once again proposed that the sides conclude peace rather than provide military assistance.

After the campaign against the Kokand Khanate, Ablai informed the Russian authorities that the aim of the war had been the restoration of seven cities captured by Irdana Biy. Although the Kokand ruler refused to make concessions, the populations of Tashkent, Bukhara, and Samarkand voluntarily recognized Ablai’s authority. In 1768, Ablai repeated his campaign. According to sources, the inhabitants of Tashkent surrendered without a fight and agreed to pay tribute. Irdana Biy sent an embassy to Ablai expressing submission. As a result of these campaigns, Ablai restored control over key cities in the region, and the rulers of Kokand and Bukhara recognized his authority. To strengthen the alliance, the ruler of Bukhara even proposed a dynastic marriage and sent Ablai rich gifts. Ablai Sultan's war against Tashkent and Khojand resulted in his advance as far as Jizzakh and ended with the establishment of control over several cities. Turkestan, Sayram, Shymkent, and Suzak came under his authority, while Tashkent was obliged to pay tribute.

In December 1770, Ablai launched another campaign against the Kyrgyz with a mounted force numbering approximately 20,000 men. The stated reasons for the campaign were "the Kyrgyz obstruction of Kazakh trade with Tashkent, frequent attempts at attacks, and the killing of people." According to some sources, the army numbered about 10,000 warriors. Before the main campaign, one of Ablai's sons conducted a reconnaissance raid into Kyrgyz territory with 2,000 warriors.

Ablai defeated the auls of the Solto and Sayak clans. After the destruction of these settlements, Kazakh detachments encountered a large Kyrgyz militia force. According to Shoqan Walikhanov

"The Kazakhs remained victorious, although the Kyrgyz fought to the death, seeking to free their captives... The Kyrgyz suffered terrible losses: of the Chongbagysh clan only two auls remained, and of the Chontolkan branch only 40 people survived."

After this battle, the Kyrgyz sent an embassy to Ablai to negotiate peace. As a sign of loyalty, prominent clan leaders gave their children as amanats. Ablai accepted these terms, and peace was temporarily established between the Kazakhs and Kyrgyz. However, conflicts between them did not completely cease.

In a letter dated 8 December 1772, Sultan Sultanmamet informed Lieutenant General Ivan Dekolong, commander of the Siberian Corps, about a planned joint campaign against the Kyrgyz together with Ablai Khan: "Ablai Sultan, having stayed with me as a guest, has safely departed for his nomadic lands, which you should know. We have concluded an agreement that in the spring he will go with two of his sons, while I will go with eight thousand of our subjects, the Kyrgyz, against the wild Kyrgyz."

When the military campaign began, Ablai and Abulfayiz requested military assistance from the Qing Empire, but their request was categorically rejected. In an edict to the Military Council dated 29 March 1774, the Qianlong Emperor refused Ablai and Abulfayiz's request because he wished to maintain neutrality. Referring to information from his informants, the emperor stated that Kazakhs and Kyrgyz were constantly hostile toward each other and carried out raids against one another, and therefore the Ili governors should not interfere in their affairs. He also emphasized that if assistance were provided to one side, the other would soon request similar support.

On 9 June 1774, Sultan Wali reported to the Petropavlovsk Fortress about the victory of Ablai Khan's Kazakh forces over the Kyrgyz. In his report, he wrote: "These days I received news from my father that he defeated his enemies, numbering up to eight thousand, many of whom he took captive. He has also sent troops to pursue the remaining ones." According to Sultan Wali's report, a Kyrgyz force of up to 8,000 men was defeated, a significant number were captured, and additional detachments were sent to pursue the survivors.

At a meeting of the Military Council held on 27 October 1774, the Ili governor Iletu reported on the development of the Kazakh–Kyrgyz conflict. According to his report, Ablai and Abulfayiz "with a large number of troops" entered the Khalabaladan area and engaged the Kyrgyz. As a result of the confrontation, they captured many people and livestock, as well as a Kyrgyz leader named Aitike. Continuing their advance, they reached the Talas Valley, where they inflicted another defeat on the Kyrgyz, killing more than one thousand people and capturing one thousand prisoners, including many elders.

The Russian Empress requested that the title of khan should be recognized and officially approved by Russia. To that end, she sent an official letter to Qyzyljar, where Abylai was expected to receive the title in 1779. He never showed up at the fort, so a Russian officer was sent to confer the title in his camp. In contrast to Ablai, other khans and sultans had been competing for the lavish gifts and stipends of the Emperors of Russia in return for their submission. Ablai Khan refused to bow down to the expanding Russian Empire and instead chose to strengthen the Kazakhs by promoting Islam and the concept of jihad throughout the state as an effort to resist foreign powers. Ablai may also have been deterred from swearing his oath out of fear of insulting the Chinese.

Following his death, Ablai's sons, namely Khanzada Wali Sultan, Khanzada Qasim Sultan, and Khanzada Adil Sultan, fought against each other to take the throne. In 1781, Wali Sultan became khan of the Kazakhs, succeeding his father after months of battle for succession, but he only succeeded in ruling over the northern clans of the Middle jüz.

== Attacks on the Volga Kalmyks ==
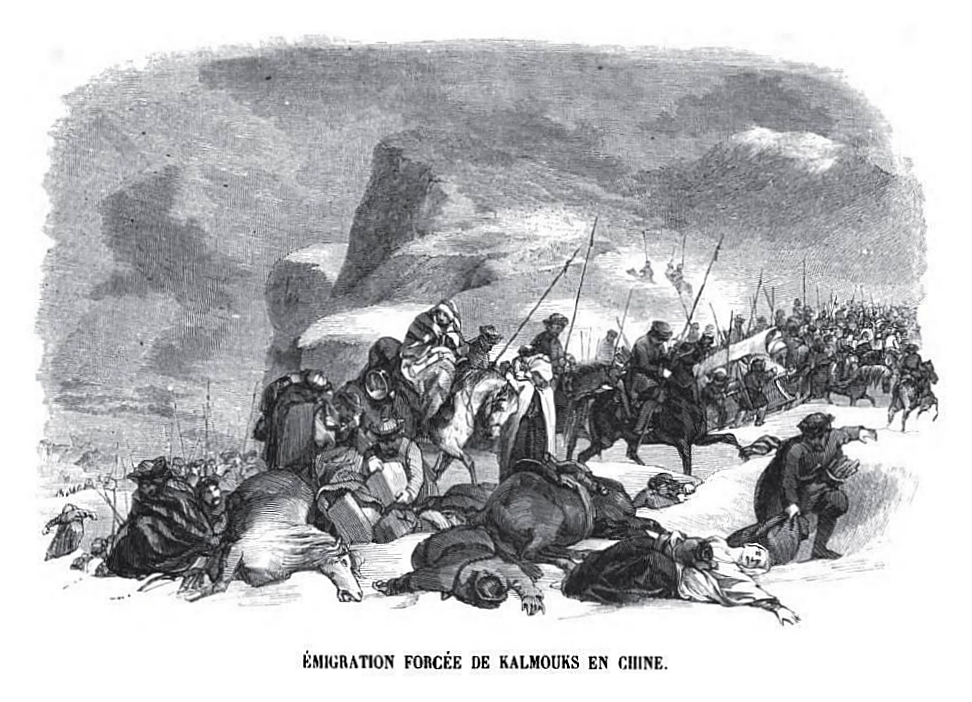
Forced emigration of the Kalmyks to China in 1771

In early 1771, Ablai received word from Nuraly that most of the Volga Kalmyks had fled toward Dzungaria. An official notification requesting that they be detained and returned was also sent to the Russian authorities. Soviet historians attributed the Kalmyks' flight to the intensification of Tsarist colonization of the Kalmyk steppe, which had led to a substantial reduction in grazing lands, increased feudal exploitation, and the growth and intensification of conflicts among elites. The Tsarist government's efforts to diminish the authority of the Kalmyk khans and turn the hereditary Kalmyk nobility into government officials, together with active efforts to Christianize the population and the increasingly frequent recruitment of Kalmyks into the Russian army, prompted part of the Kalmyk elite, led by Ubashi, to migrate to Dzungaria.

Ubashi and his supporters believed that Dzungaria remained unoccupied. Former Dzungar princes who had settled on the Volga during the Qing Empire's conquest of the Oirat state, along with Buddhist clergy, actively promoted the idea of returning to Dzungaria.

"There is no doubt that Ubashi and Seryn undertook to return to their homeland following prior communication with their fellow tribesmen in Altai, who were filled with hatred toward China. They probably also believed that, after conquering Dzungaria, that power had withdrawn its troops from the region, leaving only weak garrisons in Ili and Tarbagatai, which could easily be driven out by a combined force," wrote the Russian historian Nikita Bichurin.

In late 1770, Ubashi, under the pretext of repelling an attack by Kazakhs of the Junior Zhuz, moved with the Torghuts to the left bank of the Volga River, between Cherny Yar and Astrakhan.

In early January 1771, approximately 170,000 people set out on their journey. After crossing the Emba River, the fugitives headed toward Dzungaria, passing through the nomadic territories of the Junior and Middle Zhuzes. The Kalmyks were forcibly driven from their homes by their own feudal lords under threat of death, while those who refused to leave were severely punished.

The Russian authorities displayed negligence and a lack of urgency in organizing the pursuit of the fleeing Kalmyks. Moreover, the Ural Cossacks refused to join the expedition, resulting in the loss of valuable time. Nuraly, followed by Aichuwak, who joined him with his own forces, and their Kazakh followers pursued the fugitives and inflicted considerable losses on them.

On 7 April 1771, Ivan Reinsdorp, the governor of Orenburg, received a letter from Nuraly, khan of the Junior Zhuz, reporting on the pursuit of the Kalmyks who had fled from the Volga region. Having suffered significant losses in clashes with the Kazakhs, Ubashi and his supporters sent the zaisan Toilugu to Nuraly with a proposal to cease hostilities and allow the Kalmyks to settle among the Kazakhs. Nuraly, however, demanded that the Kalmyk feudal lords return their dependents to their former nomadic territories. In his report to the Russian authorities, Nuraly described the Kalmyks' desperate situation, remarking that they were "abandoning their own people, and [the route was covered with] heaps [of dead]." In Kazakh oral tradition, the pursuit of the Volga Kalmyks became known as the "Dusty Campaign" (Шаңды жорық).

At the Muinty River, the Kalmyks were surrounded by forces led by the Kazakh leaders Ablai, Urus, Adil, and others. In these circumstances, Ubashi sent envoys to Ablai, asking him to accept Ubashi and all those under his authority as subjects and to allocate them land for their nomadic encampments. A three-day agreement was concluded, providing for a truce and an exchange of prisoners.

Drawing on Kazakh oral traditions, Shoqan Walikhanov described the episode as follows. The Kalmyks, surrounded by Kazakh forces,

"sent seven envoys, led by a tall, dark-complexioned Kalmyk wearing an enormous fox-fur hat, as large as a cauldron. Dismounting several sazhens away, he approached the khan (Ablai) and greeted him with the words: ‘Allah jar’ (‘May God help us!’). ‘Usa (Ubashi) and Seren have sent me: Kalmyks and Kazakhs are brothers, so let us remain brothers. Accept the white yurts as tribute, and let us live in peace!’" The Kazakhs convened a council, at which Ablai declared that “the white yurts should be accepted, [the Kalmyks] reassured, and then plundered.” However, several batyrs, particularly Bayan, opposed this proposal.

According to Valikhanov, Ubashi's peace overtures were merely a stratagem intended to lull the enemy into a false sense of security, gain a brief respite, and allow his forces to recover. Toward the end of the third day, the Kalmyks launched a surprise attack, broke through the encirclement, and moved along the western shore of Lake Balkhash, leaving behind hundreds of exhausted and debilitated people, as well as dead animals.

When the Kalmyks reached Dzungaria, they were met by Qing troops prepared for combat. The Qing administration informed Ubashi that the Kalmyks would be permitted to enter Xinjiang only if they acknowledged the sovereignty of the Manchu emperor. Exhausted by the arduous journey and having lost approximately half their people and nine-tenths of their livestock along the way, the Kalmyks were forced to negotiate while continuing to suffer further losses from incessant attacks by Kazakh and Kyrgyz detachments. With their situation seemingly hopeless, the Kalmyk feudal leaders decided to accept Qing suzerainty.

== Invasion of Kyrgyzstan ==
One of Ablai Khan's principal strategic objectives was to bring the Kyrgyz tribes under his authority. In 1779, reports indicated that Ablai intended to assemble all the Kazakhs in order to "march against the Kyrgyz who had withdrawn from obedience to him, Ablai Khan, and remain there for about three years, or, once they had been subdued, settle there permanently."

In the spring of 1779, Ablai Khan assembled an army of approximately 12,000 men and launched a military campaign against the Kyrgyz. Kazakh forces commanded by Ablai's son Chingis Sultan and Abulfeyz Sultan engaged the Kyrgyz in two clashes but failed to achieve any significant success. According to D. B. Saparaliev, the Kyrgyz may subsequently have assumed that further attacks were unlikely, having learned that Ablai's expansionist ambitions did not enjoy unanimous support among ordinary Kazakhs, many of whom had simply returned to their auls (nomadic settlements).

After the sultans Abulfeyz and Chingis returned without achieving significant results, Ablai himself set out with "a considerable number of men." The results of this campaign were considerably more successful. Prominent Kyrgyz families were taken hostage as amanats—hostages held to guarantee submission—until the complete subjugation of the Kyrgyz. These hostages were subsequently distributed among Kazakh sultans.

Following the seizure of a large number of hostages, most of the biys (Kyrgyz tribal leaders and judges) were "brought into control." The sole exception was Sadyr Biy, who continued to resist and refused to surrender his children. Ablai's forces remained near Sadyr's nomadic encampments, and Ablai planned to launch another campaign if Sadyr did not hand over his children voluntarily. The Kyrgyz who had already submitted to Ablai agreed to assist him in this undertaking. The eventual outcome of this confrontation is unknown. Kazakh sultans and batyrs, including Chingis Sultan and Dat Batyr, nevertheless held the Kyrgyz warriors in high regard, describing their fighting abilities as follows: "This people […] profess the same Muslim faith as themselves and are very numerous; in warfare and in all their actions, they are more formidable and agile than the Kazakh Horde."

Usmanov's report goes on to explain how Ablai, in alliance with the sons of Sultanmamet and Abulfeyz, managed to "defeat and bring under his obedience" the numerous and "agile" Kyrgyz. Yaguda Usmanov, Ablai's personal scribe, outlined several factors that contributed to the success of Ablai's military operations against the Kyrgyz. Ablai subsequently attacked the Kyrgyz from three directions: the upper and lower reaches of the Chu Valley, as well as the direction of the Talas River. Unable to coordinate their defense, the Kyrgyz retreated into the mountains. The following year, Ablai captured the Kyrgyz leader Sadyr Khan and his son Doskul in the Talas region. Sadyr was killed while attempting to escape. According to Kyrgyz oral traditions, after the campaign Ablai levied contributions from every kibitka (nomadic tent or household). He also demanded ransoms for captives, requiring nine horses from the wealthy and one horse from the poor.

After the campaign, Ablai himself remained "between Turkistan and the borders of the wild Kyrgyz," from where his followers continued to conduct small-scale raids against the Kyrgyz. In July 1780, Sultanmamet Sultan wrote to N. G. Ogaryov that "Ablai Khan defeated the Kyrgyz […] and took people, together with nine kibitkas and all their belongings and livestock, as hostages, on the condition that the Kyrgyz would henceforth render the required service."

In November 1780, Yaguda Usmanov reported that, shortly before his death, Ablai had sent an embassy to the Kyrgyz to obtain "hostages from among the most respected Kyrgyz" the following spring, with the aim of further consolidating their subjugation and maintaining order, after which he intended to return to his own ulus (territories and communities under his authority). However, the Kyrgyz, who had no established tradition of submission to the Genghisids, continued to resist.

Soviet historians Vladimir Moiseev and Ramazan Suleimenov, discussing Ablai's campaign of 1779–1780, wrote that the threat of the destruction of their families compelled many manaps (Kyrgyz tribal leaders) to lay down their arms and acknowledge their dependence on Ablai. Kyrgyz historian Doolotbek Saparaliev, however, noted that Ablai failed to bring the Kyrgyz completely under his control, as he died suddenly in early spring 1781.

== Death and aftermath ==
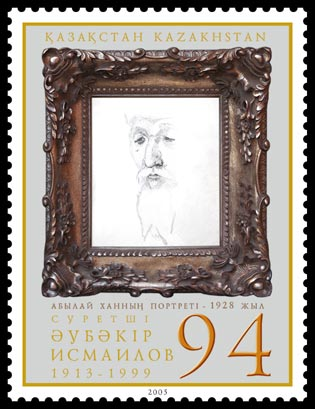
A depiction of Abylai Khan on a 2005 postage stamp of Kazakhstan

In the spring of 1780, Abylai moved with his auls to the area near Tashkent. Merchants traveling to Semipalatinsk reported that Abylai Khan was stationed along the Talas River, described as a river emerging from the mountains, "to bring the wild Kyrgyz, who nomadize in the mountains, under his authority." His force numbered no more than 200 men, consisting primarily of captured Turkmens, Kalmyks, and members of other peoples. He also engaged in agriculture in the area. In the autumn of the same year, Abylai fell seriously ill and died shortly thereafter. Although the exact date of his death is unknown, sources indicate that he died near Tashkent.

His remains were transported to Turkistan and buried with great honors in the Mausoleum of Khoja Ahmed Yasawi. More than 5,000 people attended the commemorative funeral feast held in his honor. A new khan was elected at the same location as before. According to a contemporary account, the Kazakhs, "in accordance with their ancient national custom, after prayers had been recited by an akhun brought from Tashkent and other members of their clergy, together with appropriate Quranic verses, immediately raised" Wali Sultan to the position of khan. The festivities lasted seven days, during which the participants "enjoyed the customary music of flutes and kobyz instruments and horse races, consuming the livestock they had brought with them as food and drinking kumis." Other claimants to the throne included Abulfeyz, the son of Abulmambet; Dair, the son of Sultan Barak; Urus, the son of Sultan Saltamamet; and others. However, according to contemporary sources, all of them "declined to accept the title of khan.

Upon learning of Abylai's death and the election of a new khan, the Qing authorities sent rich gifts to the Kazakhs, carried by 30 camels, and a grand funeral feast was held in the steppe in Abylai's honor. Russia dispatched Sultan Yesim to notify the authorities of the new khan of the Middle Zhuz. On 16 August, Empress Catherine II confirmed Abylai's eldest son, Wali, as the new khan of the Middle Zhuz.

The death of Abylai Khan contributed to the weakening of Kazakh statehood. In a historical irony, Abylai became the last senior khan of the Kazakhs. Following his death, the nearly three-century-old tradition of this institution in the steppe came to an end as influential Kazakh khans and sultans became increasingly drawn into the geopolitical spheres of influence of the Russian Empire, the Kokand Khanate, and Qing China. The new khan, who lacked sufficient authority, was unable to contain the growing internecine conflicts, and within a few years of Abylai's death, the state had once again fragmented into separate feudal polities. The weakening of central khanly authority and the growing influence of sultans and local elders enabled the Russian imperial government to abolish the khanate in the Middle Zhuz in the 1820s.

== Legacy ==
- One of his descendants was Shoqan Walikhanov (1835-1865), a Kazakh scholar and historian.
- His grandson Kenesary Kasymov led a revolt against the Russians in the 1830s and 40s.
- Abylai Khan University, founded in 1941, is named after Ablai Khan.
- In 1993, Ablai Khan appeared on the 100 Kazakh tenge banknote.
- The life of Ablai Khan is the subject of the 2005 Kazakhstani film Nomad.
- There is a ceremonial slow march in the Military Band Service composed by Talgat Berdigulov named after Ablai Khan
- A street in central Almaty is named after Ablai Khan.
- Abylai Khan (monument)

== See also ==
- List of Kazakh khans
- Kenesary Khan

== Sources ==
- Abuyev, Kadyrzhan Kabidenovich (2013). Yu. A. Sorokin, Kh. M. Abzhanov (ed.). Abilai Khan. Contemporaries and Successors: Monograph (in Russian). Kokshetau: Ereket. p. 308.
- Beisembaeva, A. R. (2026). Казахско-кыргызские столкновения в 1760–1780-х гг. и политика Абылая: причины, ход, результаты [Kazakh-Kyrgyz Clashes in the 1760s–1780s and the Politics of Ablai: Causes, Course, and Results]. Shakarim Journal of History (in Russian). 1 (7): 86.
- Erofeeva, Irina Viktorovna (2014). Эпистолярное наследие казахской правящей элиты. 1675–1821 гг. [The Epistolary Legacy of the Kazakh Ruling Elite: 1675–1821] (in Russian). Almaty: ABDI Company JSC.
- Khafizova, Klara Shaysultanovna (2019). Степные властители и их дипломатия в XVIII—XIX веках [Steppe Rulers and Their Diplomacy in the 18th–19th Centuries] (PDF) (in Russian). Astana: KISI under the President of the Republic of Kazakhstan. ISBN 978-601-7972-15-8.
- Moiseev, Vladimir (1991). The Dzungar Khanate and the Kazakhs (17th–18th Centuries) (in Russian). Alma-Ata: Gylym; Institute of Uighur Studies, Academy of Sciences of the Kazakh SSR.
- Noda, Jin; Onuma, Takahiro (2010). A Collection of Documents from the Kazakh Sultans to the Qing Dynasty. Central Eurasian Research Series. Tokyo: The University of Tokyo. p. 176. ISBN 9784904039175.
- Sarsenbayev, B.S.; Kabuldinov, Z.E.; Cherniyenko, D.A. (2025). "The Role of Sultan Abulfeis in Kazakh-Kyrgyz Relations in the Second Half of the 18th Century: Between the Russian and Qing Empires" (PDF). Bylye Gody. 20 (2). Cherkas Global University: 597–607. ISSN 2310-0028.
- Suleimenov, Ramazan; Moiseev, Vladimir (1988). From the History of Kazakhstan in the 18th Century (on the External and Internal Policy of Ablai) (in Russian). Alma-Ata: Nauka; Institute of History, Archaeology and Ethnography named after Ch. Ch. Valikhanov, Academy of Sciences of the Kazakh SSR.
- "Famous Kazakhs". Archived from the original on 2007-12-21. Website on the Kazakh Diaspora
- History of Kazakhstan to 1700 Encyclopædia Britannica Online.
