= Ushkonyr =

Üşqoñyr Үшқоңыр
- Village
- Location in Kazakhstan
- Coordinates: 43°22′15″N 76°37′25″E
- Country: Kazakhstan
- Region: Almaty Region
- District: Karasay District

Population (2021 census)
  - Total: 28,644
- Time zone: UTC+5 (Kazakh Time)
- Postal code: 040928

Ushkonyr (Kazakh: Үшқоңыр, Üşqoñyr), formerly known as Shamalgan (Kazakh: Шамалған, Şamalğan) or Chemolgan (Russian: Чемолган), is a rural community near Almaty in Kazakhstan. It is notable as the birthplace of first Kazakh President Nursultan Nazarbayev.
