= Kara-Kyrgyz Khanate =

Former feudal state of the Kyrgyz people

Kara-Kyrgyz Khanate Кара-Кыргыз хандыгы
- 1842–1867
- Kyzyl Tebetei

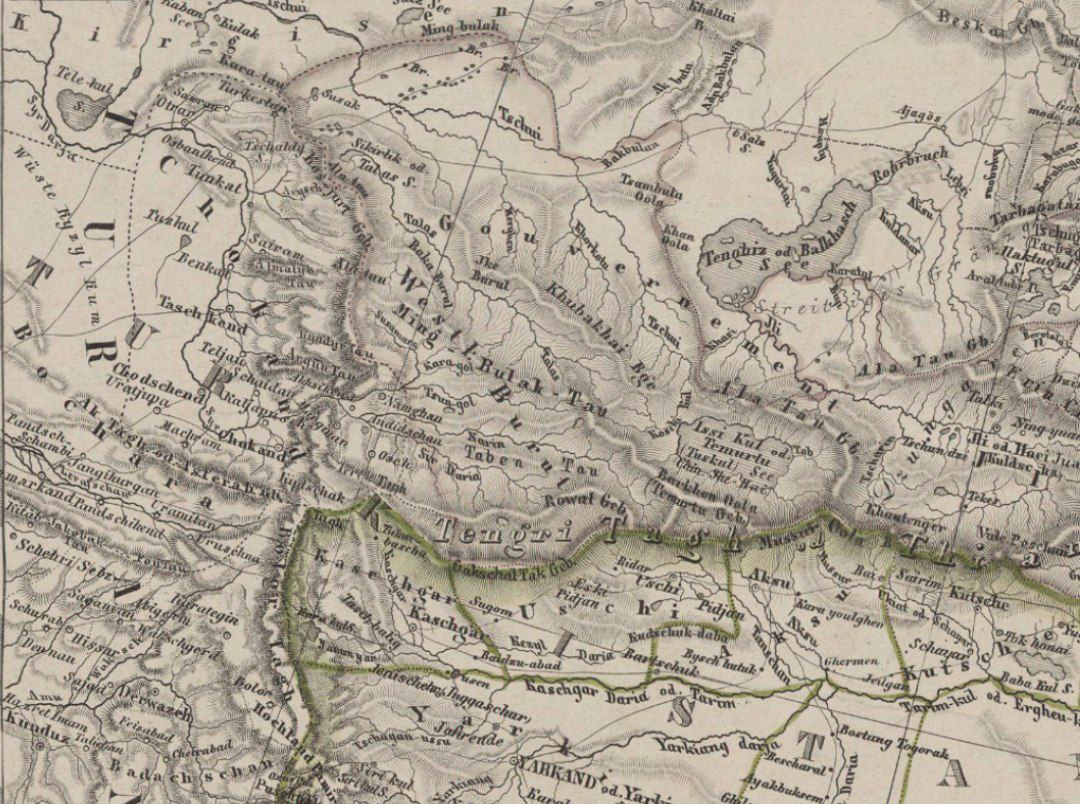
- location of the Kara-Kyrgyz Khanate (West Burut) in 1847
- Capital: Ormon-Korgon; Baisoorun; Kochkor
- Common languages: Kyrgyz
- Religion: Islam
- Demonym: Kara-Kyrgyz
- Government: Monarchy
- Khan
  - 1842–1854: Ormon Niyazbek
  - 1854–1867: Umetaaly
- Legislature: Kurultai
- Historical era: Russian conquest of Central Asia
  - Established: c. 1842
  - Ormon Khan death: 1854
  - Annexed by Russia: c. 1867

Population
  - 1847 (Note: according to the manaps own estimates.): ～50,000 yurts
  - Mid-19th century: ～1–1,200,000
Preceded by	Succeeded by
Khanate of Kokand	Russian Turkestan
- Today part of: Kyrgyzstan

The Kyrgyz Khanate, also the Kara-Kyrgyz Khanate or the Ormon Khanate, was a khanate of the Kyrgyz people established in the northern part of the territory of present-day Kyrgyzstan that existed from 1841 to 1867. The khanate was proclaimed as a result of the confederation of a number of northern Kyrgyz tribes at the initiative of Ormon Khan in 1841, who became the first ruler of the khanate. After the death of Ormon Khan, his son Umetaaly would succeed him and continue to govern the fragmented khanate, where he would later face Russian annexation in 1867, eventually ending the khanate rule.

== History ==
=== Names in Russian documents ===
In various Russian documents from the 19th century, the settlement area of the Kyrgyz ethnic group was called Dikokamennaya Orda, or the Orda of the mountain warlords. The term Dikokamenny is a combination of two words дикий-dikiy (savage, uncivilized; warlord) and каменный-kamenny (the word kamen in the Russian language at that time can be translated as mountains), while the word Orda, according to Mahmud al-Kashgari’s 11th-century dictionary, "Orda" is defined as "the city where the khan resides". In the 20th-century dictionaries of ancient Turkic languages, it is translated as "the place where the khan resides" (in Russian, резиденция хана). The well-known orientalist Benjamin P. Yudin expanded this definition, stating that in Russian, hence the meaning of the word Orda is a steppe nomadic state or a nomadic union. Academician Vasily Radlov noted the following about this.

The Kazakh-Kyrgyz and their south-eastern neighbors, the Black Kyrgyz, are at the exact same level of civilization. In terms of language, customs, clothing, place of residence, as well as profession and lifestyle, Black-Kyrgyzs do not differ much from Kazakh-Kyrgyz, but the type of Black-Kyrgyz differs from Kazakhs. This was especially noticeable to me in 1862, when I first visited the Kara-Kyrgyz Buğu tribe and met them on the banks of the Karkyra River. The face of the Kara-Kyrgyz was very similar to the face of the mountain Kalmaks and Teleuts of Altai. Black Kyrgyz dress very little differently from Kazakhs, the only difference that I noticed was kaftans, bands and hats made of white felt, which are very rare in Kazakhs. The decoration of their cottages is not much different from the Kazakhs, only in cottages you will see less carpets and embroidered braids. In addition, near every gray house there is a spear, which the Kazakhs do not have.

Meanwhile, the word Kara-Kyrgyz roughly means "the Black Kyrgyz", as it was known to the Russians prior to the revolution.

=== Pre-unification status ===
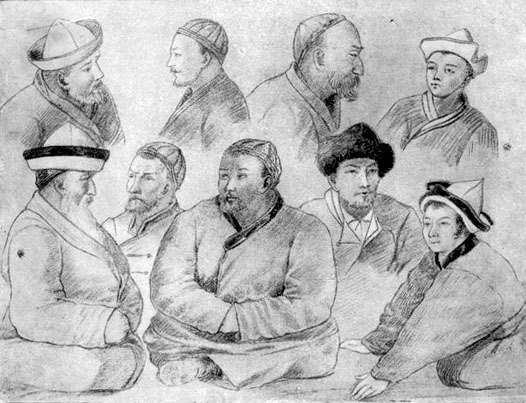
Types of Kara-Kirghizs of the tribe of Bughu and Sarybaghysh (1857), Pavel Kosharov

Starting from the mid-18th century, the Kyrgyz of Central Asia were divided into two main groups based on their regional and geographical locations: Arkalik (northeastern Kyrgyz) and Andijanik (southwestern Kyrgyz). By the 1830s and 1840s, this division became more defined. In the 19th century, the Kyrgyz were conquered by the Khanate of Kokand and was unified into one nation as their subject and was introduced with Islam. During the Kokand period, the Kyrgyz tribal leaders received the titles of datka and parvanachi, and some of them began to aspire to become a paramount chief leader. In the year 1841, Madaly Khan's power was relinquished by the Bukharan Emirate, and the Kokand people were transferred to Bukhara. Soon after in the same year, a popular movement occurred near Namangan led by a military leader named Nüzüp biy Esenbay, he led the Kyrgyz, Uzbeks, Tajiks and Kypchak tribes to join this movement to take the advantage of Kokand political situation by having Sherali Khan installed as a puppet monarch in an effort to reform the khanate. As external threats and unstable political situation in Central Asia grew due to various conflicts including the encroaching Russian Empire, which had been establishing outposts nearby. Various tribes in Central Asia began to take actions as a response to the situation, the Sarybagysh chief Ormon Niyazbek began to unite the tribes of the northern Kyrgyzstan, and would soon become their unified Khan.

Prior to the foundation of the Khanate, a popular figure among Northern Kyrgyz tribes had emerged, Ormon Niyazbek uulu, he hailed from one of the most influential clans of the Sarybagysh tribe, he was the great-great-grandson of Mamatkul Biy, a biy of the unified Kyrgyz tribe who struggled against the Dzungar Khanate in the 18th century, thus making him able to rose to prominence and become a tribe chief at the age of 25 and was experienced in tribal management. Ormon also had a skillful military knowledge, he is trained to ride a horse, able to perform a sword and spear fighting, skilled at kurash wrestling, and had participated in a conflict at the age of 18, these knowledge made him able to gain control over other tribes.

=== Ormon Khan Period ===
==== Foundation ====
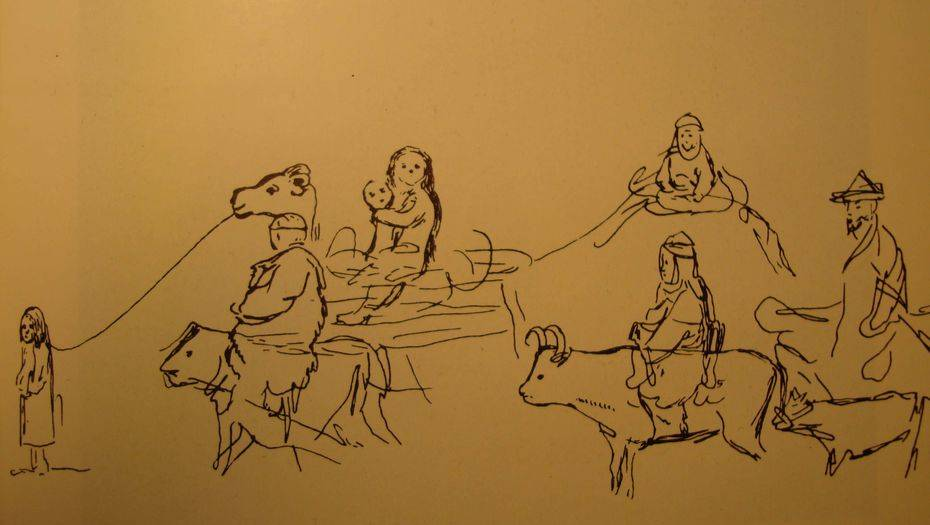
Nomadic movement of Issyk-Kul Kirghiz people (1856), Shoqan Walikhanov.

As Central Asia undergoes significant political shifts in the 19th century, the Kyrgyz people found themselves aligned with this momentum, the Kyrgyz tribal elites held a kurultai in the summer of 1842 near Kochkor village, west of Issyk-Kul, discussing on how to deal with the internal and external issues, a decision was made to unite the northern Kyrgyz tribes, and at the suggestion of a Sarybagysh clan chief Jantay Batyr, it was decided to declare Ormon Niyazbek uulu as the Khan of the northern Kyrgyz people. According to Soviet historian Saul Abramzon, there were several participants who attended the kurultai ceremony, some of them were elite members of the Solto tribe, Sayak tribe, as well as elite members of the southern Kyrgyzstan as representatives of the Kokand Khanate.

In accordance with ancient nomadic Kyrgyz traditions, Ormon was dressed in red shoes, seated on a white felt, and was crowned as Khan by having a tebetei placed on his head. Nine white horses were sacrificed to honor the participants of the kurultai. The chiefs and elites then took an oath of allegiance by cutting of a branch (Kyrgyz: Чырпык кесүү; chyrpyk kesuu) as a symbolic gesture of making a binding commitment or promise, and by this coronation ceremony, the supreme authority of Ormon Khan over the northern Kyrgyz tribes was confirmed.

==== A new state ====
The new khanate was still rudimentary, so Ormon Khan sought to strengthen it, he established a legal code whom he referred to as the Ormon ukuu, meaning Teachings or Edifications of Ormon that also includes a number of folk rites, edicts, and a decree that declared Ormon to be the sole khan of the Kyrgyz.

In the diplomatic relationship of the khanate, Ormon had several groups of envoys whom he sent to various neighboring countries and tribes such as the Uzbeks, the Russians, the Kokand Khanate, and the powerful Kyrgyz tribes in a special diplomatic mission. But the external affairs of the khanate was far from being honest, it was noted that the khanate would act against foreign envoys from Kokand, Tashkent, and Kazakh by acting "manipulative, arrogant, and deceitful", therefore the affairs were described to be Terror Ormonicus due to Ormon's fraudulent acts against envoys from his neighboring countries. An instituted restrictions were also applied for merchants from Uzbek controlled cities of Ferghana and Tashkent who wished to conduct business with the Kyrgyz tribes.

The khanate had a military force, which was adapted to be able to quickly defend against external attacks. The military also included Ormon's personal guard, which consisted of the 30 most accurate shooters in the khanate, armed with wick guns and was commanded by Chergyn, one of Ormon's sons. The khanate army also operated a military workshop, which would be set up near the yurts. During campaigns, the army was accompanied by a military band consisting of a kerney (Note: A brass instrument used for fanfares.) and two surnays player. Ormon established his khanate capital in the village of Baisoorun in the Semyonov Gorge. Around the 1840s, he had an adobe fortress (korgon) constructed at the San-Tash pass, designed to protect him against any internal threats, his fortress became also served as a summer capital.

==== Wars against Kokand and Kazakh ====
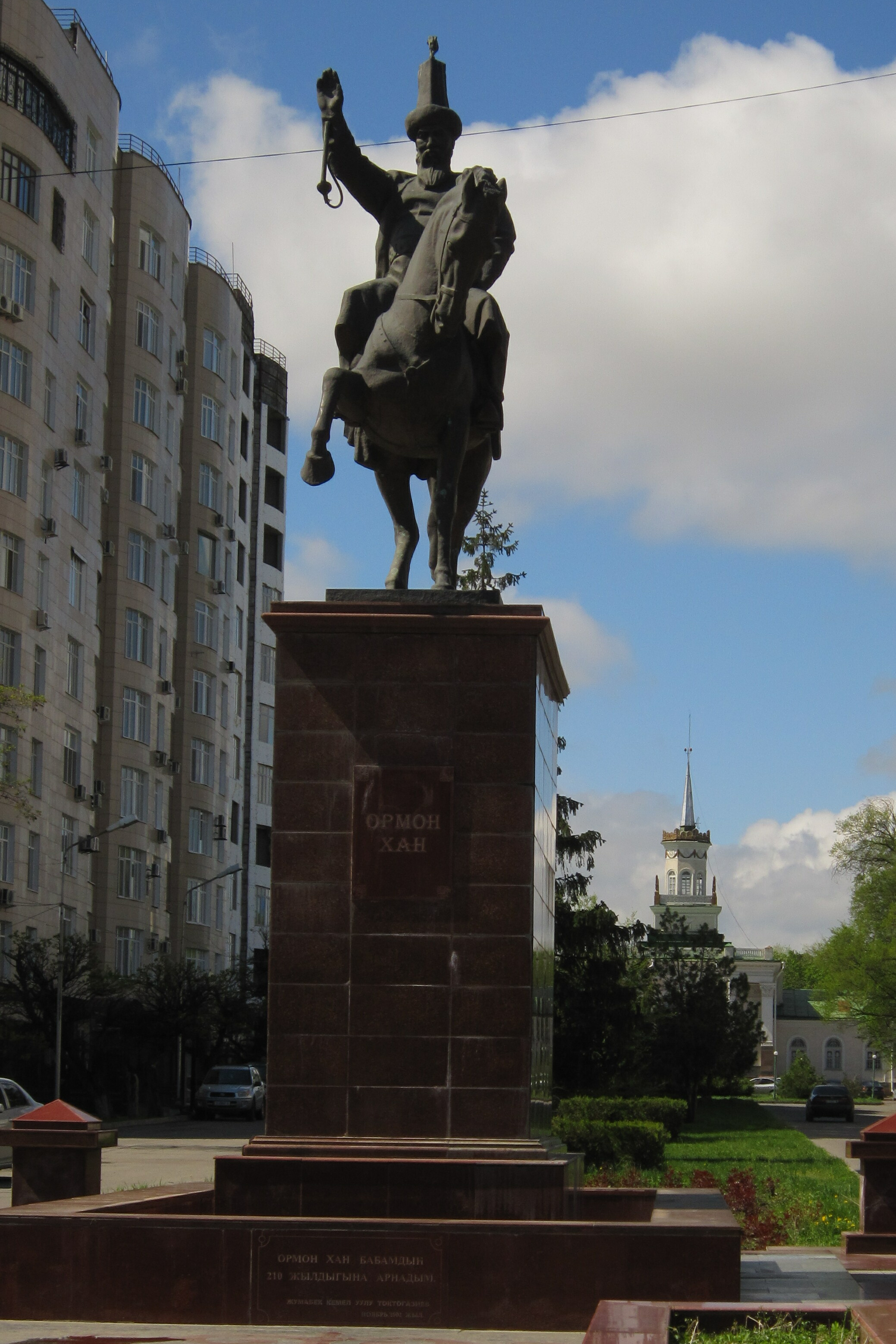
Statue of Ormon Khan in Bishkek.

With the establishment of an independent Kyrgyz state, the Kokand khanate wanted to keep the Kyrgyz status as a subject and attempted to make Ormon Khan an ally by bestowing him the title of parvanchi, despite this gesture, Ormon refused to pay tribute to the Kokand, breaking its Vassal status. In 1842 and 1843, Ormon Khan's army began assaulting and destroying the Kokand fortresses in the Issyk-Kul and Naryn regions, driving out the Kokand cavalries, and around the same time, Ormon's army also attacked and sacked the Kokand khan palace in Balykchy. In 1844, the Kara-Kyrgyz Khanate forces occupied fortresses at Bishkek, a local stronghold of the Kokand. These actions carried by Ormon Khan has increased his authority over the Kyrgyz nobility, as well as demonstrating his capability of becoming a leader equal to that of the Kokand khans.

Around the year 1846, the Russian Empire was zealous at conquering Central Asia, in the territory of the Kazakh Khanate, a rebellion had occurred led by Kennesary Qasymov, the Kazakh khan. With Kennesary being driven out from his territory by Russian forces advancing from Orenburg, he and his army retreated to the Zhetysu region, on the border with the Kyrgyz tribes in the Chüy and Ili valleys. Seeking opportunity for making an alliance, Kennesary sent envoys to Ormon Khan, requesting to make an alliance hoping to fight against both the Russians and the Kokand. After receiving the message, Ormon consulted Kennesary's proposal with tribal elders, contrary to what was Kennesary had hoped for, Ormon rejected the proposal and instead turned against Kennesary by attacking subjects loyal to him. As a response to Ormon's hostile actions, in the spring 1846, Kennesary and his army invaded the Kara-Kyrgyz lands, raiding the Solto and Sarybagysh tribes. Kennesary began invading again in April 1847, he led the army of around 20,000 to the Chüy Valley, encamping at the village of Maitobe near the modern city of Tokmok, intending to conquer the Kyrgyz tribes and becoming their Sultan. Ormon Khan was seeking Russian assistance, but instead he failed to receive it, he then decided to lead the Kyrgyz to repel the invading army. In expelling Kazakh invaders from Ormon's territory, he used his military knowledge to build a strategy, he had successfully tricked Kennesary forces into thinking that Ormon had forces larger in size than Kennesary, this was achieved by splitting the forces into ten small groups, then Ormon led the army into a high place at the mountain passes in Shamshy and Onbir-Jylga. At the passes the Kyrgyz forces would chop down trees and shrubs, producing dust, and create multiple campfires, this gave the Kazakh a false impression that a large group of Kyrgyz reinforcements had marched through the mountain pass and that the Kyrgyz had the numerical advantage.

With a confused Kazakh forces, Ormon Khan encircled and attacked the Kazakh forces at Maitobe. Early in the battle, a large number of Kazakhs were dispersed by Ormon's trumpeters, and Jantay killed the Kazakh prince Seren with a lance. After this, two Kazakh sultans, Rustem Aspandiaruly and Sypatai, betrayed Kenesary and deserted from the battlefield, taking a large portion of his army with them. The remaining Kazakh forces retreated to a quagmire near Mykan. The Kazakh army was completely defeated at Mykan, and Kenesary was captured. Around 32 Kazakh sultans were killed in the battle. The captured Kenesary was executed at the Chukar Sengir Hill near the Kara-Suu River, and his head was sent to the Russian commander at Omsk and later brought to Emperor Nicholas I. The Russians were happy with the death of Kennesary, and rewarded the Kyrgyz leaders, granting Ormon and Jantay with gold medals and gold-embroidered robes. Ormon was also personally given a golden saber and was appointed a lieutenant colonel in the Imperial Russian Army. On 22 August 1847, the Kyrgyz and Kazakhs officially signed a peace treaty at the Kazakh city of Taldykorgan.

==== Expansion to Ili ====
According to a recorded information from Belek Soltonoev's work "Red Kyrgyz History", during the winter of 1850–1851, Ormon Khan led around 600 retinues along with 80 unmounted horses across a snow-covered ridge pass on the north of Issyk-Kul, breaking through the snowdrifts to reach the Ili region. After reaching Ili, the Kazakhs in Ili received Ormon Khan with respect and pledged their allegiance to him. In this way, he managed to stop horse theft and fighting between the Kyrgyz and the Kazakhs.

On March 23, 1852, in a letter written by Ormon Khan to the Tsar of Russia, Nicholas I, he expressed his intent to define the land areas of his khanate and aimed to settle on the right bank of the Ili River, bordering with the Kazakhs, intending to move the khanate capital there.

==== Internal conflict and Ormon Khan death ====
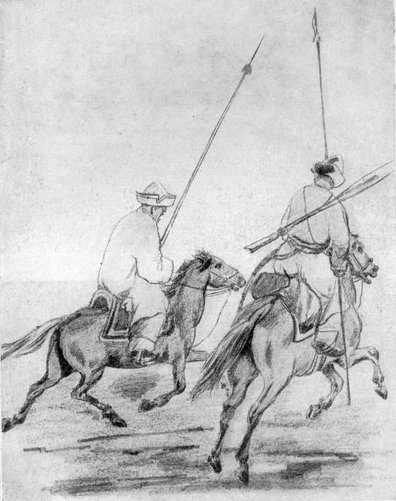
Kara-Kirghiz of the Bugu tribe in a Baranta (1857), by Pavel Kosharov.

Despite being unified against external threats, the Kara-Kyrgyz Khanate still suffered from internal strife and feuds. In the 1850s, one of these feuds erupted with the Bugu tribe, which was located on the northern shore of Issyk-Kul. The feud was caused by several reasons, including the Sarybagysh having poor pasture lands and wishing to expand, the Bugu refusing to extradite a man who betrayed Ormon, and an attempt by the Bugu to form an alliance with the Russians against Ormon, which was caused by the domination of the Sarybagysh over the other tribes in the khanate. The two sides began raiding each other, and Ormon officially declared war, receiving assistance from Kokand, who wished to show their value as an ally. After initial success in the campaign, Ormon attacked the main Bugu camp near the village of Semyonovka. However, Ormon's army were defeated by the Bugu, and Ormon was captured.

Borombay Bekmuratov, the chief of the Bugu, wanted to use Ormon as a hostage, intending to release him only with assurances that Ormon would not attack the Bugu again. However, Balbay-baatyr, a Bugu leader who had been a longtime rival of Ormon, stabbed Ormon with a spear, mortally wounding him. Ormon was transferred to his daughter's yurt, (Note: Ormon's daughter Kulan was the wife of Borombay's son.) where he died in her arms. The exact location of Ormon's body is unknown, as his relatives buried him in secret so his body would not be abused. Ormon is believed to be buried either in a pasture near Semyonovka or above the village of Grigor'yevka in the foothills of the Küngöy Ala-Too Range. In the 2010s, Ormon's descendants installed a small monument in the pasture.

=== The period after Ormon Khan ===
The centralized Kara-Kyrgyz Khanate reigned for 14 years under Ormon Khan rule, and upon his death, his son Umetaaly would took the throne as the new khan and reigned for another 12 years, the evidence of Umetaaly inheriting his father's position as the new khan was noted in later records and studies by researchers such as Nikolai Severtsov and Pyotr P. Semyonov in 1856, and Shoqan Walikhanov in 1867.

==== Civil war in Issyk-Kul ====
After the death of Ormon Khan, his sons Umetaaly and Torogeldi, the commander of the Kyrgyz army, led a series of reprisals against the Bugu tribes, razing their settlements and taking captives. The Bugu were then defeated in a battle on the northern shore of Issyk-Kul lake, and were forced to retreat towards Qing dynasty territory, hoping to find assistance from Qing officials in East Turkestan region, as Borombay had previously been a Chinese subject. Borombay proposal for assistance was then rejected by the Qing officials, who didn't want to assist the Russian-aligned tribe. Desperately needing assistance, the Bugu turned to Russia and officially became their subjects.

==== Fragmentation of the khanate ====
With the defeat of the Kazakh Khanate by Russians and the Bugu tribes becoming Russian subjects to seek their assistance against the Kyrgyz, the Russian Empire now had their eyes on the Kyrgyz, with the intention to subjugate them. Following this, the Russians began establishing military outposts along the Issyk-Kul, and in 1855, the Russians started their conquest against the Kyrgyz tribes, implementing various methods to suppress the Kyrgyz, one of the methods was by turning the Kazakhs against the Kyrgyz, the Kazakhs were given a secret instruction in order to break the remaining Kyrgyz manaps. As a result, the Tynay clan of the Sarybagysh tribe, led by Jantay, agreed to accept the Russian rule, becoming their subject, and Baitik Kanai uulu of the Solto tribe, who was in conflict with Rahmatulla, the Bey of Bishkek, approached Russian authorities, while Jangrach and Umetaaly continued to resist.

In 1860, Captain Venyukov's unit arrived to Kyrgyz lands to capture and punish the Sarybagysh leaders. Umetaaly and Töregeldi moved their people to Naryn and At-Bashy. During the battles at Kastek and Uzun-Agach in the summer and fall of 1860, between the Russians and the Kokand forces, the Russians supported Alimbek Dakta side. The Kokand khan at the time, Malla Khan fled to Naryn region where Umetaaly accepted him as a refugee and offered him a significant support.

In 1862, the Russians attacked and captured the Tokmok and Pishpek fortresses. In 1863, Russian troops besieged the Kurtka fortress. That same year, the Cherik tribe in At-Bashi recognized Russian rule. It is known that Umetaaly had organized and tried to liberate the territory of the Kara Kyrgyz Khanate from the newly arrived Russian invaders. On June 18, 1863, he and his soldiers attacked Russian postal workers who were going to Naryn and killed one of them, and the next day on June 19, with the support of his relatives and the manap of the Sayak tribe, Osman Taylak uulu, and other tribal leaders, he assembled thousands of warriors near the Naryn River at a place called Eki Chat near Kurtka. Waving Kyrgyz banners and accompanied by drums, they surrounded and engaged a group of 40 Russian soldiers carrying gunpowder and provisions, led by Lieutenant Zubarev, for three days. However, Captain Protsenko’s unit arrived to reinforce the Russians, and Ümötaaly’s forces were forced to retreat.

A detachment of 2,500 soldiers led by Colonel M. G. Chernyaev's took over Auliye-Ata on June 5, 1864, and a part of the force advanced through Talas, occupying Chatkal valley. That year, Alimqul Atalyk, a Kyrgyz who was the de facto ruler of the Kokand Khanate, undertook a campaign from Toguz-Toro to Kochkor, with Ümötaaly joining him. However, after the Russians captured Shymkent, a Kokand-held city, Alimkul returned to Kokand. He died defending Tashkent, leaving Ümötaaly with only his brother Chargyn and the Sayak manap Osman as trusted allies. In 1865, some of the Sayak tribes accepted Russian rule, despite this pressure, Umetaaly continued the resistance, warring against Kyrgyz tribes that submitted to Russia.

After Yakub Beg came to power in Kashgar in 1867, he began to exert pressure on Umetaaly from one side, while Russian forces, led by Colonel Poltoratsky, organized an expedition into the At-Bashy and Chatyr-Köl regions during the summer of that same year, squeezing Umetaaly's troops from the south. This combined pressure put on Umetaaly would later made him approach the Russians to submit to their rule.

==== Abolition of the khanate ====
Despite a long resistance against Russia, Umetaaly eventually approached N. A. Severtsov’s troops in the fall of 1867, declaring his full submission to Russian authority, officially ended the khanate rule. In order for Umetaaly to return to his home pastures, he was required to pay a compensation by the Russian government for the damages caused during the conflict, including the death of two soldiers, along with four wounded soldiers, and one officer, in a total amount of to 375 horses or 7,500 rubles, based on a price of 20 rubles per horse. Umetaaly paid 5,231 rubles and 42 kopecks in 1868, with the remaining sum collected later. In 1868, the Russian government adopted the "Regulations on the Administration of the Turkestan Territory," which implemented a system of community-based governance. According to this reform, instead of a single manap (tribal leader) governing an entire tribe, a bash (leader) was to be elected for every clans, Umetaaly, however, did not engage with the Russian authorities anymore, he gained a Russian citizenship and probably moved to a quiet life.

== Territorial boundary ==
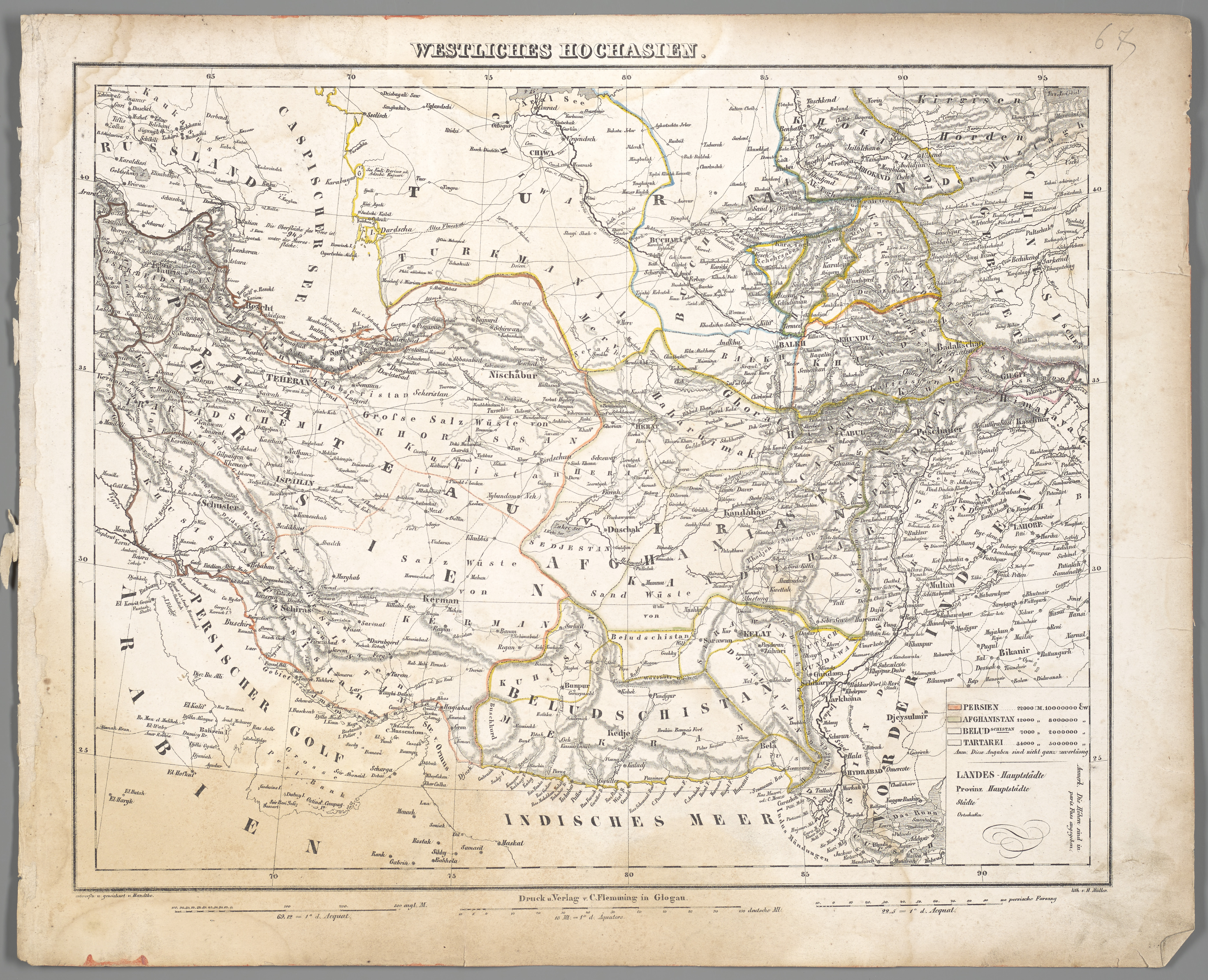
"Kyrgyz Horde" (Kirzisen Horden) was shown on the 1844 map of the German cartographer Friedrich Handtke, depicting the area between the Fergana Valley and Lake Issyk-Kul.

Historian Osmonaaly Sydykov highlights that Ormon Khan governed a vast territory, which included Issyk-Kul, Chüy, At-Bashy, Naryn, Ile, Olyya-Ata (modern-day Taraz), and Namangan, where he exerted control over the Kyrgyz people. In a letter dated March 23, 1852, Ormon Khan communicated with Tsar Nicholas I of Russia, detailing his efforts to establish the territorial boundaries of the Kyrgyz state. He mentioned plans to relocate his capital to the right bank of the Ili River, aiming to expand his influence over Kyrgyz lands. The letter outlined his authority over regions such as the northern and southern shores of Issyk-Kul, the Chüy Valley, Jumgal, Kochkor, Naryn, and Ketmen-Töbö, while explicitly identifying his state as the Kara Kyrgyz Khanate (Black Kyrgyz Khanate). In the letter, he wrote: "I have relations with the Black Kyrgyz of Issyk-Kul’s north and south shores, Chüy Valley, and the regions of Jumgal, Kochkor, Naryn, and Ketmen-Töbö... We are the Kara Kyrgyz". This letter conclude that Ormon rule had extended over a large area.

== Legal system ==
The laws that was applied to the Kara-Kyrgyz Khanate were referred to as the Ormon ukuu, which were edifications of Ormon Khan. The codification of those rule were in accordance with the Kyrgyz traditions, it included a number of folk rites and oaths, including a recognition of Ormon Khan as the sole ruler. Codifications that were made during Ormon's reign also introduced a penal system, for example, a murder would be punished by a fine (kuna) of 300 horses, adultery would be 40 horses, and theft would be 9 horses. Additionally, property would be confiscated from those who "confused the horses with iron fetters", and anyone who stole cattle would be sentenced to death. Death sentences were carried out several times annually at a gallows (darga), which was intended to instill fear in both his subjects and neighboring tribes. Other state systems were also implemented. This included a council made up of prominent biys, a system of governors tasked with oversight of the tribes, and a judicial system, in which biys and chiefs served as judges. Due to restrictions on who was allowed to manage livestock, the peasants (bukara) were effectively disenfranchised, as even prominent biys weren't allowed to manage their livestock.

The ultimate reason of Ormon Khan laws was directed towards strengthening unity among tribes and re-establishing a strong, centralized Kyrgyz state. He wants to be focused on establishing lawfulness within Kyrgyz society by introducing new laws based on ancient customs to maintain order and discipline, and he conducted extensive explanatory work among the people. These efforts have been preserved within the Kyrgyz people’s memory as the "Ormon Code".

Islam was advocated as a religion by Ormon Khan during his reign, and his son Umetaaly also seemed to support the Islamic religion in his letters he wrote for his contemporaries in the early 1861.

Ormon Khan also had an ornate royal throne, a personal seal, and a flag.

== Legacy ==
The legacy of the Kara-Kyrgyz Khanate and Ormon Khan remains popular in Kyrgyzstan, and Ormon is regarded as a national hero who united the tribes of northern Kyrgyzstan and created the first Kyrgyz state, referring to him as "Kyzyl Tebetey". In 2002, an equestrian monument of Ormon Khan was installed on Chinghiz Aitmatov Avenue in Bishkek, and in 2012, the Kyrgyz Post Office issued a stamp featuring Ormon. Several of Ormon's descendants maintain positions in the Kyrgyz government and academia, including Kyrgyz National University professor Ryskul Zholdoshev, film director Melis Ubukeyev, and Supreme Council speaker Kanatbek Isaev.

== Bibliography ==
=== Sources ===
- Bunbury, Turtle (2016). 1847: A Chronicle of Genius, Generosity & Savagery. Dublin: Gill & Macmillan. ISBN 978-0-7171-6843-9.
- Duishembieva, Jipar (2015). Visions of Community: Literary Culture and Social Change among the Northern Kyrgyz, 1856-1924 (PDF). Seattle: University of Washington.
- Keller, Shoshana (2020). Russia and Central Asia: Coexistence, Conquest, Convergence. Toronto: University of Toronto Press. ISBN 978-1-4875-9434-3.
- Osmonov, Oskon Dzhusupbekovich (2016). A History of Kyrgyzstan: From Stone Age to the Present (2 ed.). Bishkek: Sarybaev TT. ISBN 978-9967-04-680-1.
- Palat, Madhavan K. (2003). History of Civilizations of Central Asia. Vol. 5. Paris: Unesco. ISBN 978-92-3-103876-1.
- Prior, Dan (2012). The Šabdan Baatir Codex: Epic and the Writing of Northern Kirghiz History. Brill Publishers. ISBN 978-90-04-23040-8.
- Tillett, Lowell (1969). The Great Friendship: Soviet Historians on the Non-Russian Nationalities. Chapel Hill: University of North Carolina Press. ISBN 978-0-8078-1103-0.
- Soltonoev, Belek (2003). "Кызыл кыргыз тарыхы" (PDF) (in Kyrgyz). Archived from the original on February 21, 2024.
- Emil Asanov (2003). "Кыргыз тарыхы боюнча кыскача энциклопедия" (in Kyrgyz). Archived from the original (PDF) on February 6, 2024.
- Asanov, Uson (2012). "Kyrgyzstan" National Encyclopedia: Volume 4 (in Kyrgyz). Bishkek: Центр государственного языка и энциклопедии. ISBN 978 9967-14-104-9.
- Toktomamatova, N.K.; Kantoroeva, A.K. & Osmonova, U.A. (2023). "HERALD OF INTERNATIONAL UNIVERSITY NAMED AFTER K. SH. TOKTOMAMATOV, POPULAR SCIENCE PERIODICAL JOURNAL OF 2023" (PDF). International University Named After K. Sh. Toktomamatov (I): 329. ISSN 1694-5913. Archived from the original (PDF) on July 13, 2024.
