= Ormon Khan =

Ormon Khan Ормон хан
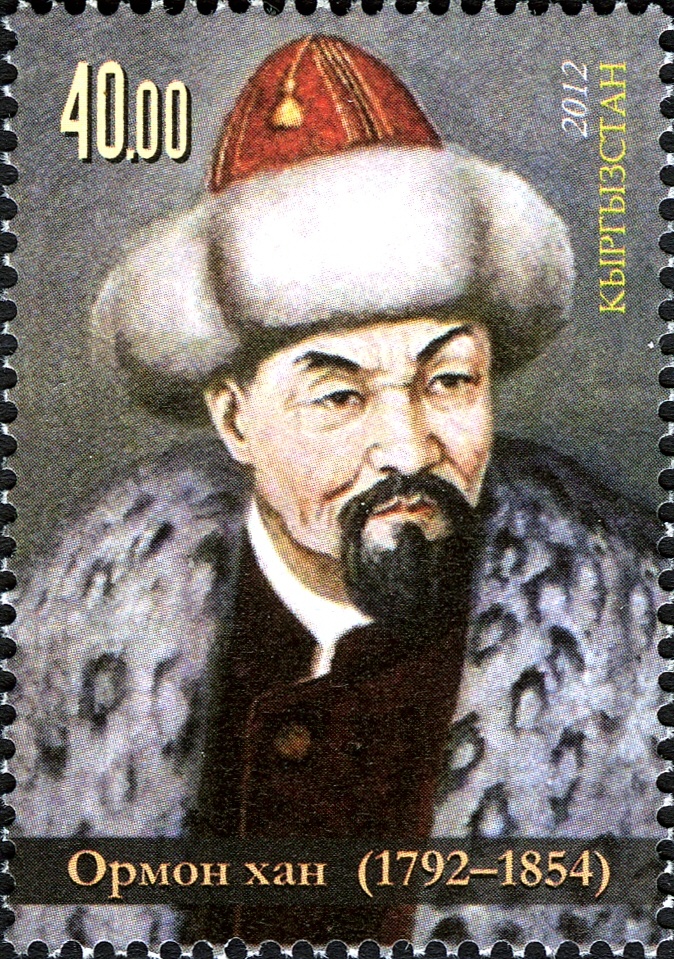
- Ormon Khan portrayed in a 2012 stamp.

Khan of the Kara-Kyrgyz Khanate
- Reign: 1842 – 1854
- Coronation: Summer 1842 in a kurultai near Kochkor
- Predecessor: State established
- Successor: Umetaaly
- Born: Ormon Niyazbek uluu c. 1792; Issyk-Kul Valley
- Died: 1854 (aged 61–62); Semyonovka
- Burial: Either in a pasture next to Semyonovka or in the foothills above Grigor'yevka
- Issue: Umetaaly; Chargyn; Kulan; others
- Tribe: Sarybagysh
- Religion: Islam

Ormon Khan (Kyrgyz: Ормон хан; c. 1792 – 1854) or Ormon Niyazbek uulu (Kyrgyz: Ормон Ниязбек уулу) was the first and only khan of the Kara-Kyrgyz Khanate, ruling from 1842 until his death in 1854. A member of the powerful Sarybagysh tribe, Ormon's reign saw a centralization of the Kyrgyz tribes, with the establishment of legal and judicial systems. Ormon was a close ally of the Russian Empire in the region, winning a series of wars against the Khanate of Kokand and defeating a Kazakh army led by Kenesary Khan, who had been rebelling against the Russians. In 1854, during a conflict with a rival Kyrgyz tribe, Ormon was captured in battle and executed. Ormon's khanate collapsed following his death, with the region falling under Russian control by 1868.

== Background ==
Ormon Niyazbek uulu was born around 1792 in the Issyk-Kul valley of Kyrgyzstan. Ormon was a member of the powerful Sarybagysh tribe, and his family was very influential in the region. His great-great-grandfather, Mamatkul Biy, had been a high-ranking manap amongst the northern Kyrgyz and was proclaimed khan in 1758. Ormon's grandfather, Esenkul Biy, permanently settled Kyrgyz tribes in the Chüy and Talas valleys. However, Ormon's father, Niyazbek, is said to have made "little impression on Sarybagysh memory" besides being the father of Ormon.

Ormon was trained in horseback riding and fighting with sword and spear from a young age, and he was skilled at kurash wrestling. Ormon began fighting in war at the age of 18. At 25, Ormon had risen to become the chief of the Sarybagysh tribe. During his tribal reign, Ormon actively participated in the management of his tribe, and he became popular with other Kyrgyz chiefs. By the early 1840s, Ormon had also gained control of the Sayak tribe, and he began exerting influence over the other tribes in the region.

== Khan of the Northern Kyrgyz ==
=== Kurultai and coronation ===
During this period, the Kyrgyz tribes were under the nominal authority of the Khanate of Kokand, located primarily in modern Uzbekistan. By the 1840s, Kokand had been in decline due to both external and internal factors, including wars with the Emirate of Bukhara and Qing China, as well as frequent palace coups and civil wars. In 1842, Bukhara invaded Kokand, temporarily occupying the state and executing the khan of Kokand, Muhammad Ali Khan. That summer, the chiefs of the northern Kyrgyz tribes organized a kurultai on the western shore of Issyk-Kul near Kochkor in order to plan how to protect the Kyrgyz tribes from external threats. Also in attendance at the kurultai were ambassadors from Kokand and some southern Kyrgyz tribes.

At the kurultai, Ormon argued that the tribes of northern Kyrgyzstan would be stronger united against external threats, including Kokand and the encroaching Russian Empire, which had been constructing outposts nearby. The chiefs in attendance agreed, and at the suggestion of the Sarybagysh chief Jantay Karabekov, Ormon was declared khan of the northern Kyrgyz tribes, the Kara-Kyrgyz Khanate. Ormon's coronation occurred at the kurultai. First, a tebetei, which is a traditional Kyrgyz headdress with a red top, was placed on Ormon's head as a crown, and he was then put on a white felt mat and raised in the air three times. Following this, nine white horses were slaughtered to honor the chiefs who attended the kurultai.

=== State structure ===
As khan, Ormon sought to strengthen the foundation of the state. He created an official legal code, referred to as the Ormon ukuu, meaning Teachings of Ormon or Ormon's Edification. In accordance with Kyrgyz traditions, the code included a number of folk rites, including a decree that an oath would be taken by cutting a rod, as well as a decree that Ormon was the sole khan of Kyrgyzstan. The code also introduced a penal system: murder would be punished by a ransom (kuna) of 300 horses, adultery would be 40 horses, and theft would be 9 horses. Additionally, property would be confiscated from those who "confused the horses with iron fetters", and anyone who stole cattle would be sentenced to death. Death sentences were carried out several times annually at a gallows (darga), which was intended to instill fear in both his subjects and neighboring tribes. Other state systems were also implemented. This included a council made up of prominent biys, a system of governors tasked with oversight of the tribes, and a judicial system, in which biys and chiefs served as judges. Due to restrictions on who was allowed to manage livestock, the peasants (bukara) were effectively disenfranchised, as even prominent biys weren't allowed to manage their livestock.

Ormon also established a diplomatic corps, which acted as a Ministry of Foreign Affairs, led by a diplomat named Bayserke, who was tasked with travelling to Kokand with important tasks. The diplomatic corps also including a "travelling plenipotentiary" named Saza, who would travel to other states, including to the Uzbeks, the Russian Empire, and powerful Kyrgyz tribes. Ormon's external affairs were described as being part of the Terror Ormonicus: the khanate would act "manipulative, arrogant, and deceitful" towards diplomats from Kokand, Tashkent, and the Kazakhs. He also instituted restrictions on merchants from the Uzbek cities of Ferghana and Tashkent who wished to conduct business with the Kyrgyz. Amongst Ormon's inner circle was, Torogeldi, a close relative who served as commander-in-chief, and Jantay, who became Ormon's closest adviser. Also in his inner circle was Alybek-baatyr, (Note: May be Alymbek Datka.) who was responsible for internal order, and Kalygul, who became Ormon's seer (oluya).

The backbone of the state was the military, which was adapted to be able to quickly defend against external attacks. The military also included Ormon's personal guard, which consisted of the 30 most accurate shooters in the khanate, armed with wick guns and under the command of Chargyn, one of Ormon's sons. Torogeldi also maintained a personal retinue. The army operated a military workshop, which would be set up near the yurts. During campaigns, the army was accompanied by a military band consisting of a kerney (Note: A brass instrument used for fanfares.) and two surnays. Ormon himself was skilled at playing the komuz. Ormon established his capital in the village of Baisoorun in the Semyonov Gorge. In the 1840s, he had an adobe fortress (korgon) constructed at the San-Tash pass, designing it to be able to protect against internal conflicts. This fortress became Ormon's summer capital. Ormon was regarded as a "shrewd political and military leader" by the Russians.

Ormon advocated for the worship of Islam, teaching mullahs about the religion.

=== Wars against Kokand and the Kazakhs ===
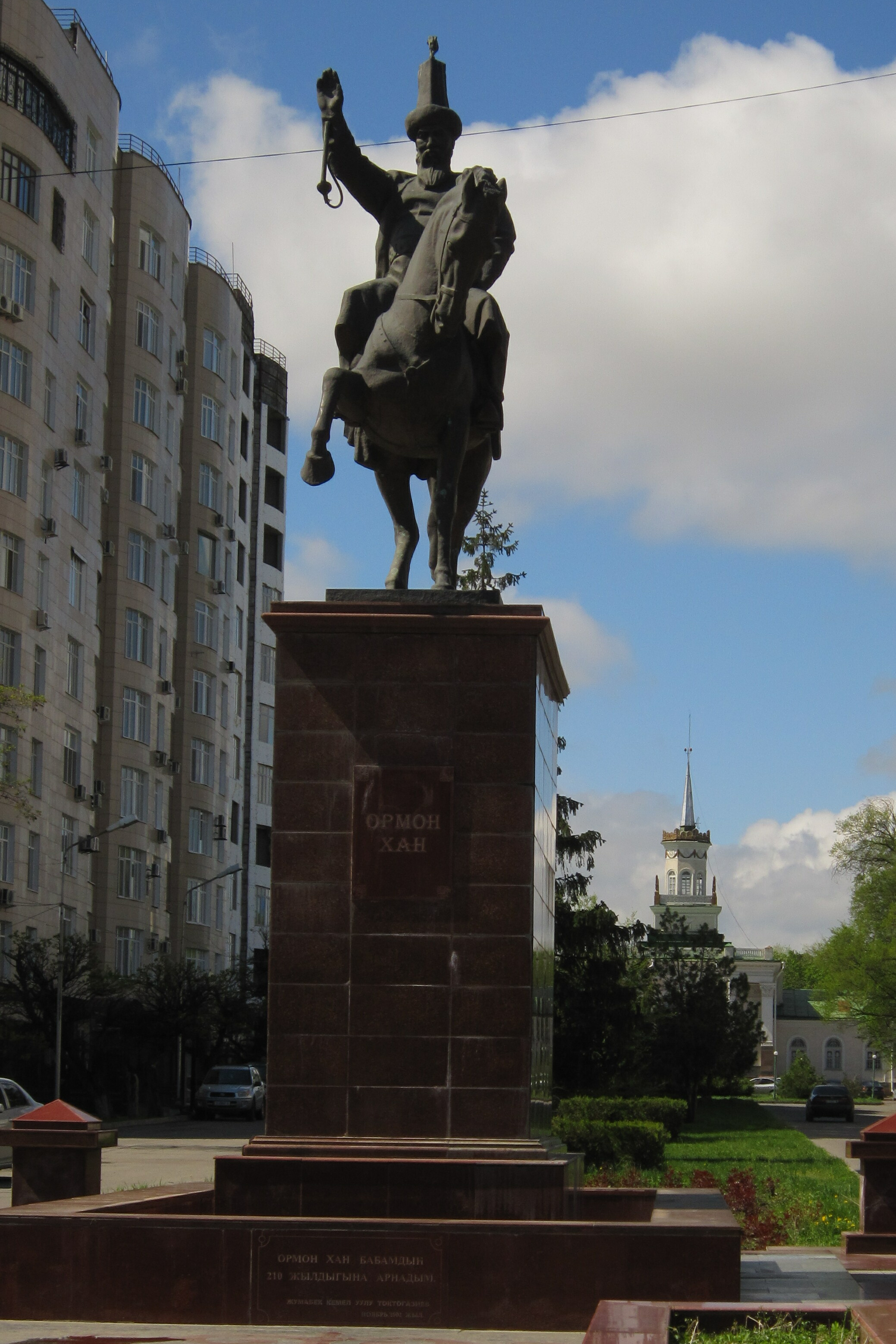
Statue of Ormon Khan in Bishkek.

In an attempt to keep Ormon as an ally, Kokand awarded Ormon with the prestigious title of parvanachi. Despite this gesture, Ormon refused to pay tribute to Kokand, officially breaking the vassalage. In 1842 and 1843, Ormon army destroyed the Kokand fortresses in the Issyk-Kul and Naryn regions, driving out the Kokand cavalry. Ormon's forces "managed to inflict a series of crushing blows on the Kokand troops" and captured and burned the Kokand khan's palace in Balykchy. In 1844, Ormon's forces also captured the fortress at Bishkek, a local stronghold for the Kokand army. This increased Ormon's authority over the Kyrgyz nobility, as well as demonstrating that Ormon had become an equal to the Kokand khan.

In 1846, Kenesary Khan, the leader of the Kazakh Khanate who was leading a rebellion against the Russian Empire, was forced out of his territory by Russian forces advancing from Orenburg. Kenesary's army retreated to the Zhetysu region, which was on the border with the Kyrgyz tribes in the Chüy and Ili valleys. Kenesary sent ambassadors to Ormon, requesting an alliance to fight against both Russia and Kokand. However, after consulting with tribal elders, Ormon rejected Kenesary's proposal and began raiding subjects loyal to the Kazakhs. In response, Kenesary invaded the Kyrgyz lands in spring 1846, raiding the Solto and Sarybagysh tribes. In April 1847, Kenesary raised an army of around 20,000 soldiers and invaded the Chüy Valley, encamping at the village of Maitobe near the modern city of Tokmok, intending to conquer the Kyrgyz tribes and become their sultan. After failing to receive assistance from the Russians, Ormon decided to lead the Kyrgyz response to the invasion.

Showing himself to be a talented military strategist, Ormon tricked the Kazakh army into thinking the Kyrgyz forces had a larger size than in actuality. This was achieved by splitting soldiers into small groups of ten and commanding them to go to the mountain passes at Shamshy and Onbir-Jylga. At the passes, the groups would chop down trees and shrubs, raise dust, and create multiple campfires. This would give the Kazakhs the false impression that a large group of Kyrgyz reinforcements had marched through the mountain pass and that the Kyrgyz had the numerical advantage.

After causing this confusion, Ormon encircled and attacked Kenesary's army at Maitobe. Early in the battle, a large number of Kazakhs were dispersed by Ormon's trumpeters, and Jantay killed the Kazakh prince Seren with a lance. After this, two Kazakh sultans, Rustem Aspandiaruly and Sypatai, betrayed Kenesary and fled from field, taking a large portion of the army with them. The remaining Kazakh forces retreated to a quagmire near Mykan. The Kazakh army was completely defeated at Mykan, and Kenesary was captured. 32 Kazakh sultans were killed in the battle. Kenesary was executed at the Chukar Sengir Hill near the Kara-Suu River, and his head was sent to the Russian commander at Omsk and later to Emperor Nicholas I. The Russians were grateful with the execution of Kenesary, and rewarded the Kyrgyz leaders, granting Ormon and Jantay with gold medals and gold-embroidered robes. Ormon was also personally given a golden saber and was appointed a lieutenant colonel in the Imperial Russian Army. On 22 August 1847, the Kyrgyz and Kazakhs officially signed a peace treaty at the Kazakh city of Taldykorgan. Kenesary was the last Kazakh khan, and after his defeat, Kazakhstan would be integrated into the Russian Empire.

In 1848, Ormon requested assistance from the Russian bailiff of the Golden Horde, Baron Wrangel, (Note: It is unclear which Baron Wrangel this refers to.) in a war against Kokand; in exchange for Russian aid, Ormon would become a Russian citizen. In 1852, the Russian governor of Western Siberia, General Gustav Khristianovich Gasford, wrote that Ormon should be rewarded for his services to the Russian Empire by receiving the Kazakh lands in the Trans-Ili Valley. Gasford intended to force the Kazakhs to need to ask for Russian assistance, as well as to allow Ormon to pacify the region for Russian colonization. However, the proposal was ultimately rejected by Russian officials the following year.

=== War against the Bugu and death ===
Despite being unified against external threats, the Kara-Kyrgyz Khanate still suffered from internal strife and feuds. In the 1850s, one of these feuds erupted with the Bugu tribe, which was located on the northern shore of Issyk-Kul. The feud was caused by several reasons, including the Sarybagysh having poor pasture lands and wishing to expand, the Bugu refusing to extradite a man who betrayed Ormon, and an attempt by the Bugu to form an alliance with the Russians against Ormon, which was caused by the domination of the Sarybagysh over the other tribes in the khanate. The two sides began raiding each other, and Ormon officially declared war, receiving assistance from Kokand, who wished to show their value as an ally. After initial success in the campaign, Ormon attacked the main Bugu camp near the village of Semyonovka. However, Ormon's army were defeated by the Bugu, and Ormon was captured.

Borombay Bekmuratov, the chief of the Bugu, wanted to use Ormon as a hostage, intending to release him only with assurances that Ormon would not attack the Bugu again. However, Balbay-baatyr, a Bugu leader who had been a longtime rival of Ormon, stabbed Ormon with a spear, mortally wounding him. Ormon was transferred to his daughter's yurt, (Note: Ormon's daughter Kulan was the wife of Borombay's son.) where he died in her arms. The exact location of Ormon's body is unknown, as his relatives buried him in secret so his body would not be abused. Ormon is believed to be buried either in a pasture near Semyonovka or above the village of Grigor'yevka in the foothills of the Küngöy Ala-Too Range. In the 2010s, Ormon's descendants installed a small monument in the pasture.

Ormon's death led to the collapse of the Kara-Kyrgyz Khanate. Torogeldi and Ormon's son Umetaaly led a series of reprisals against the Bugu, razing settlements and taking many captives. The Bugu were defeated in a battle on the north shore of Issyk-Kul and were forced to retreat towards China, where they hoped the Qing officials in East Turkestan would offer assistance, as Borombay had previously been a Chinese subject. After being rejected by the Chinese, who did not want to assist the Russian-aligned tribe, the Bugu fled to Russia and formally became Russian subjects. Following this, the Russians began establishing outposts along Issyk-Kul, battling Kokand and the Kyrgyz tribes. In 1862, Jantay, who was Ormon's successor as chief of the Sarybagysh tribe, became a Russian subject. The following year, Umetaaly led a rebellion against the Russians, but was defeated at Ak-Talaa and forced to flee to Kashgar in East Turkestan. The remainder of Ormon's khanate would be integrated into the Russian Empire by 1867.

== Legacy ==
Ormon remains a popular, though controversial figure, in Kyrgyzstan. His admirers see him as a national hero who united the tribes of northern Kyrgyzstan and created the first Kyrgyz state, referring to him as "Kyzyl Tebetey". However, his critics consider him to have been a tyrant who led a reactionary feudal movement, seeking to centralize the khanate by whatever means necessary. Russian archaeologist Alexander Natanovich Bernshtam compared Ormon to a miniature version of Ivan the Terrible.

In 2002, an equestrian monument of Ormon Khan was installed on Chinghiz Aitmatov Avenue in Bishkek, and in 2012, the Kyrgyz Post Office issued a stamp featuring Ormon. Several of Ormon's descendants maintain positions in the Kyrgyz government and academia, including Kyrgyz National University professor Ryskul Zholdoshev, film director Melis Ubukeyev, and Supreme Council speaker Kanatbek Isaev.
