= History of Kyrgyzstan =

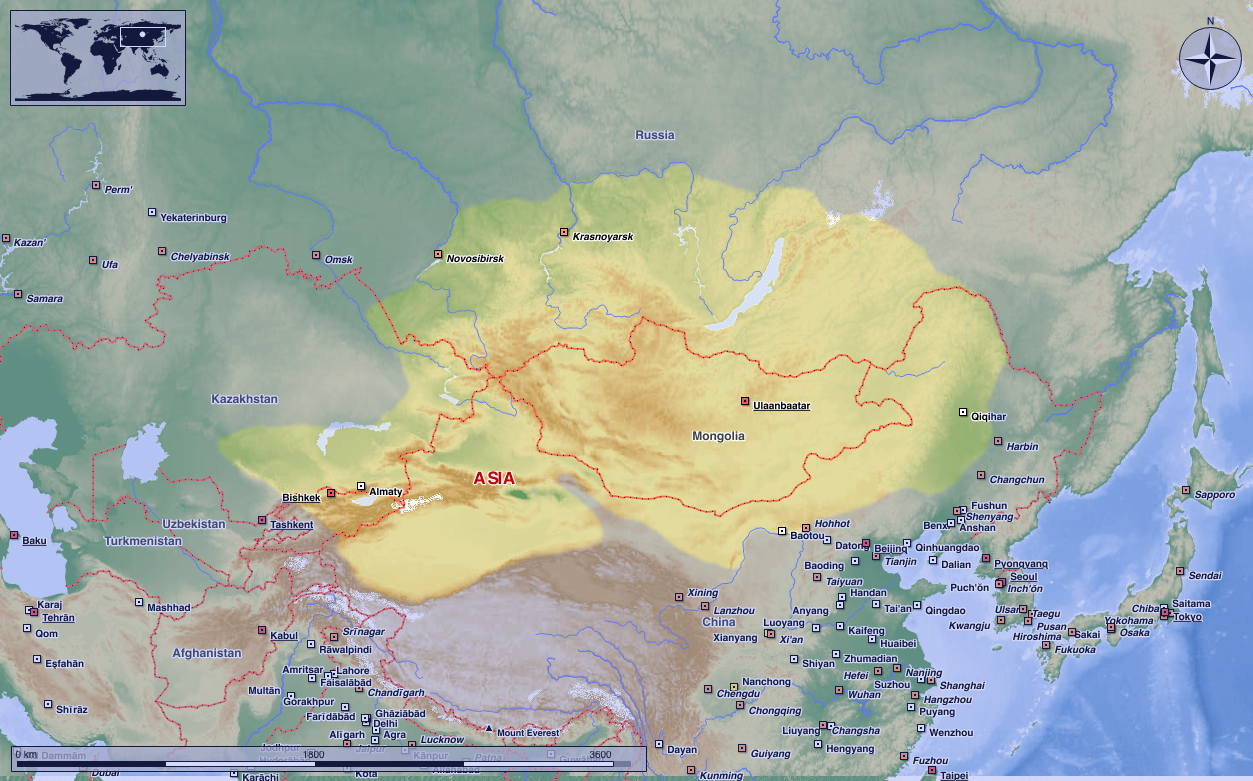
Yenisei Kyrgyz Khaganate

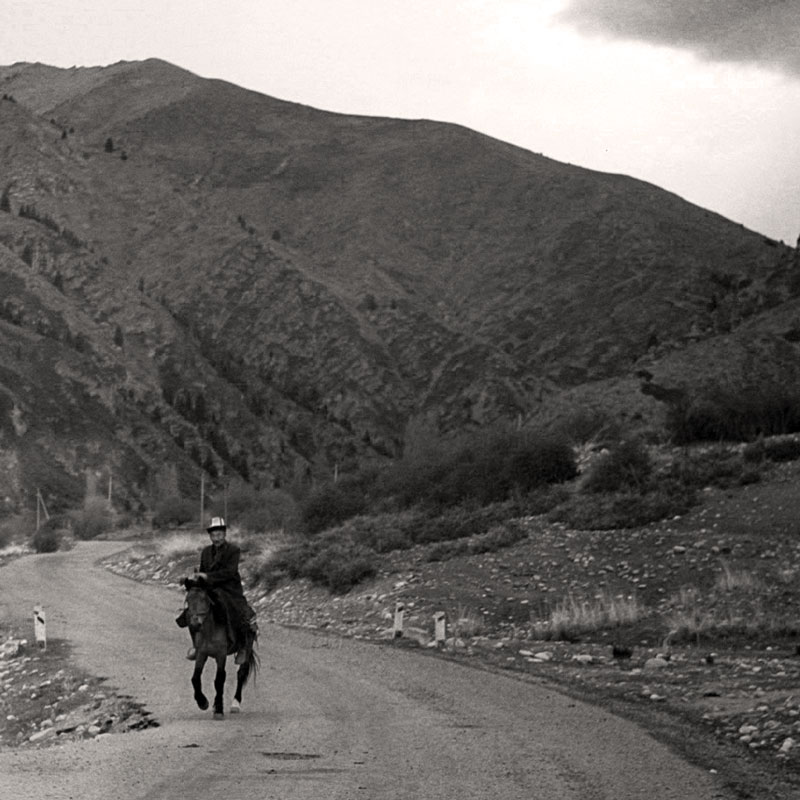
Man on horse in Kyrgyzstan (1995)

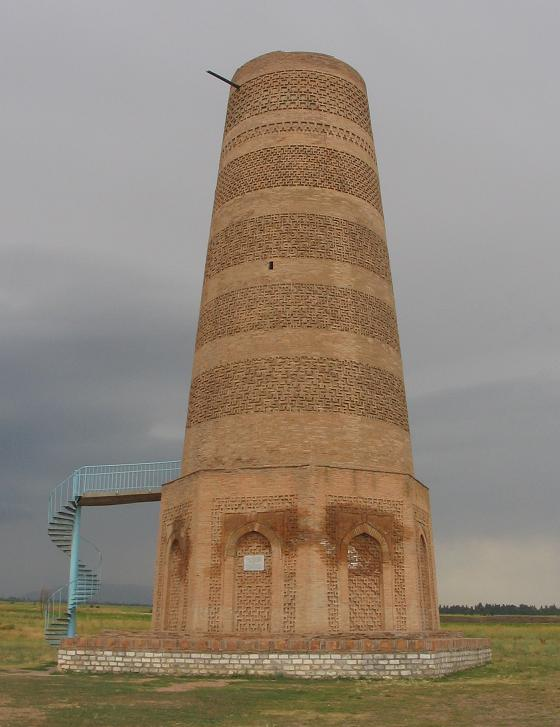
Burana Tower in Balasagun (11th century).

The history of the Kyrgyz people and the land now called Kyrgyzstan goes back more than 3,000 years. Although geographically isolated by its mountainous location, it had an important role as part of the historical Silk Road trade route. Turkic nomads, who trace their ancestry to many Turkic states such as the First and Second Turkic Khaganates, have inhabited the country throughout its history. In the 13th century, Kyrgyzstan was conquered by the Mongols; subsequently it regained independence but was invaded by Kalmyks, Manchus, and Uzbeks. In 1876, it became part of the Russian Empire, remaining in the USSR as the Kirghiz Soviet Socialist Republic after the Russian Revolution. Following Mikhail Gorbachev's democratic reforms in the USSR, in 1990 pro-independence candidate Askar Akayev was elected president of the SSR. On 31 August 1991, Kyrgyzstan declared independence from Moscow, and a democratic government was subsequently established.

== Early history ==
Stone implements found in the Tian Shan mountains indicate the presence of early humans in what is now Kyrgyzstan as many as 200,000 to 300,000 years ago. The first written records of a civilization in the area occupied by Kyrgyzstan appear in Chinese chronicles beginning about 2000 BC.

== Origins of the Kyrgyz people ==
The Yenisei Kirghiz lived in the upper Yenisey River valley, central Siberia. Chinese sources of the 2nd century BC and Muslim sources of the 7th–12th centuries AD describe the Kyrgyz as red-haired with fair complexion and green (blue) eyes. First appearing in Chinese Records of the Grand Historian as Gekun or Jiankun (鬲昆 or 隔昆), and later as part of the Tiele tribes, they came under the rule of the Göktürks and Uyghurs. The early Kyrgyz state reached its greatest expansion after defeating the Uyghur Khaganate in 840 AD. Then Kyrgyz quickly moved as far as the Tian Shan range and maintained their dominance over this territory for about 200 years. In the 12th century, however, the Kyrgyz domination had shrunk to the Altay Range and the Sayan Mountains as a result of the rising Mongol expansion. With the rise of the Mongol Empire in the 13th century, the Kyrgyz migrated south. Plano Carpin, an envoy of the Papal states, and William Rubruck, an envoy of France, all wrote about their life under the Mongols. Various Turkic peoples ruled them until 1685, when they came under the control of the Oirats (Dzungars).

63% of the modern Kyrgyz men carry Haplogroup R1a1 (Y-DNA), comparable to the prevalence of the haplogroup among the Tajiks (64%).

== Early medieval times ==
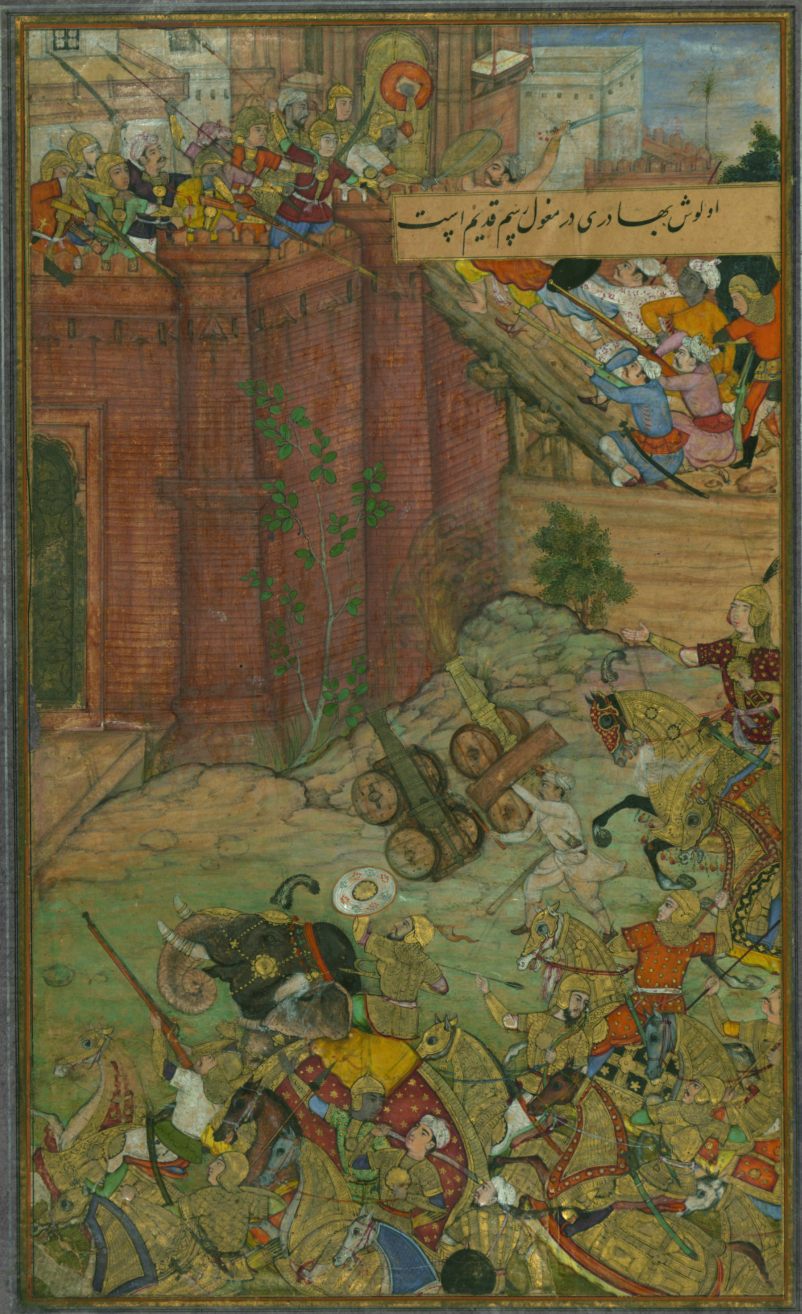
The siege and battle of Isfarah. Babur and his army assaults the fortress of Ibrāhīm Sārū (painting circa 1589–90)

The first Turks to form a state in the territory of Central Asia (including Kyrgyzstan) were Göktürks or Kök-Türks. Known in medieval Chinese sources as Tujue (突厥 tú jué). The Göktürks under the leadership of Bumin/Tuman Khan/Khaghan (d. 552) of Ashina tribe or dynasty and his sons established the first known Turkic state in 551 in the general area of territory that had earlier been occupied by the Xiongnu, and expanded rapidly to rule wide territories in Central Asia. The Göktürks split into two rival Khanates, of which the western one disintegrated in 744.

The first kingdom to emerge from the Göktürk Khaganate was the Buddhist Uyghur Empire that flourished in the territory encompassing most of Central Asia from 744 to 840.

After the Uyghur empire disintegrated, a branch of the Uyghurs migrated to oasis settlements in the Tarim Basin and Gansu, such as Gaochang (Karakhoja) and Hami City (Kumul), and set up a confederation of decentralized Buddhist states called Kara-Khoja. Others, mainly closely related to the Uyghurs (the Karluks), occupying the western Tarim Basin, Ferghana Valley, Jungaria and parts of modern Kazakhstan bordering the Muslim Turco-Tajik Khwarazm Sultanate, converted to Islam no later than the 10th century and built a federation with Muslim institutions called Kara-Khanlik, whose princely dynasties are called Karakhanids by most historians. Its capital, Balasagun flourished as a cultural and economic centre.

The Islamized Karluk princely clan, the Balasagunlu Ashinalar (or the Karakhanids) gravitated toward the Persian Islamic cultural zone after their political autonomy and suzerainty over Central Asia was secured during the 9–10th century.

As they became increasingly Persianized they settled in the more Indo-Iranian sedentary centers such as Kashgaria, and became detached from the nomadic traditions of fellow Karluks, many of whom retained cultural elements of the Uyghur Khanate.

The principality was significantly weakened by the early 12th century and the territory of modern Kyrgyzstan was conquered by the Mongolic Khitan people. The Kara-Khitan Khanate (simplified Chinese: 西辽; traditional Chinese: 西遼; pinyin: Xī Liáo; 1124–1218), also known as Western Liao, was established by Yelü Dashi (耶律大石) who led around 100,000 Khitan remnants after escaping the Jurchen conquest of their native country, the Khitan dynasty.

The Khitay conquest of Central Asia can thus be seen as an internecine struggle within the Karluk nomadic tribe, played out as dynastic conflict between the conquering Buddhist Khitay elites and the defending Kara-Khanid princes. This conflict resulted in the subjugation of the latter by the former and in the subjugation of the Muslim Karluks by their kin.

== Mongol domination ==
The Mongol invasion of Central Asia in the 13th century devastated the territory of Kyrgyzstan, costing its people their independence and written language. The son of Genghis Khan, Juche, conquered the Kyrgyz tribes of the Yenisey region, who by this time had become disunited. At the same time, the area of present-day Kyrgyzstan was an essential link in the Silk Road, as attested by several Church of the East gravestones. For the next 200 years, the Kyrgyz remained under the Golden Horde, Chagatai Khanate and the Oirats as well as Dzungars that succeeded that regime. Freedom was regained in 1510, but Kyrgyz tribes were overrun in the seventeenth century by the Kalmyks, in the mid-eighteenth century by the Manchus, and in the early nineteenth century by the Uzbeks.

The Mongol Empire (1206-1294/1368) was the largest contiguous empire and the second-largest empire overall in world history. It emerged from the unification of Mongol and Turkic tribes in modern-day Mongolia, and grew through invasion, after Genghis Khan had been proclaimed ruler of all Mongols in 1206. The Mongol Empire began to split following the succession war in 1260–1264, with the Golden Horde and the Chagatai Khanate being de facto independent and refusing to accept Kublai Khan (1260–1294) as Khagan. By Kublai's death, the Mongol Empire had already fractured into four separate khanates or empires, each pursuing its interests and objectives. The kagans of the Yuan dynasty assumed the role of Chinese emperors and fixed their capital at Khanbaliq (modern-day Beijing) from the old Mongol capital Karakorum. Although other khanates accepted them as their titular suzerains and sent tributes and some support after the peace treaty in 1304, the three western khanates were virtually independent and continued developing as sovereign states.

Eventually the Mongol rule in China fell in 1368 and was replaced by the Ming dynasty though the Genghisid Borjigin dynasty survived in Mongolia until the 17th century. Temujin, the son of a Mongol chieftain, who suffered a difficult childhood, united the nomadic, previously ever-rivaling Mongol-Turkic tribes under his rule through political manipulation and military might. In 1203–1205, the Mongols under Temujin destroyed all the remaining rival tribes (Kereyd, Merkits) and brought them under his sway. In 1206, Temujin was crowned as the Kagan of the Yekhe Mongol Ulus (Great Mongol Nation) at a Kurultai (general assembly) and assumed the title "Chingis Khan" (or more commonly known as "Genghis Khan" probably meaning Universal ruler) instead of the old tribal tities such as Gur Khan or Tayang Khan. This event essentially marked the start of the Mongol Empire under the leadership of Genghis Khan (1206–1227). Genghis Khan appointed his loyal friends as the heads of army units and households. He also divided his nation into arbans (each with 10 people), zuuns (100), myangans (1000) and tumens (10,000) of decimal organization.

Genghis Khan rewarded those loyal to him and placed them in high positions. He proclaimed new law of the empire Yassa and codified everything related to the nomads' everyday life and political affairs at the time. For example, he forbade hunting animals during breeding time, selling women, stealing other's properties, and fighting between the Mongols by his law. He quickly came into conflict with the Jin dynasty of the Jurchens and the Western Xia of the Tanguts in northern China. Under the provocation of the Muslim Khwarezmid Empire, he moved into Central Asia as well, devastating Transoxiana and eastern Persia, and then raiding into Kievan Rus' and the Caucasus. Before his death, Genghis divided his empire among his sons and immediate family, but as custom made clear, it remained the joint property of the entire imperial family who, along with the Mongol aristocracy, constituted the ruling class.

In 1207 Kyrgyz possessions on the Yenisei, in Tuva and Altai were entered into part of Mongol Empire. But in 1273–1293 Kyrgyz rulers restored their independence after repeated rebellions Kyrgyz tribes against Mongols power in 1217, 1218, 1273–1280. In 1218 the east Turkestan and Semirechie were conquered by Mongols. His third son, Ugedei, inherited Genghis Khan's empire. The designated Great Khan personally controlled the lands east of Lake Balkhash as far as Mongolia. Tolui, the youngest, the keeper of the hearth, was granted the northern Mongolian homeland. Chagatai, the second son, received Transoxania, between the Amur-Darya and Syr-Darya rivers in modern Uzbekistan, and the area around Kashgar. He made his capital at Almalik near Kulja in northwestern China. Apart from problems of lineage and inheritance, the Mongol Empire was endangered by the great cultural and ethnic divide between the Mongols themselves and their mostly Islamic Turkic subjects. * In 1269, during the common meeting of khans of Chagatai and Ugedei uluses, Khaidu (1269- 1301) was officially chosen to be a Khan. His lands extended from Altai to Amur-Darya, including the territory of what is now Kyrgyzstan and Eastern Turkestan (an extensive region of central Asia between Siberia in the north and Tibet, India, Afghanistan, and Iran in the south: formerły divided into West (Russian) Turkestan (also called Soviet Central Asia), comprising present-day Turkmenistan, Uzbekistan, Tajikistan, and Kyrgyzstan and the South part of Kazakhstan, and East Turkestan consisting of the Xinjiang Uygur Autonomous Region (Chinese).

== Timurids and Uzbeks ==
The Kyrgyz in the north were never totally subjugated by Timurlane. However, his conquests and influence had a unifying role in the southern region. In the 15th century, a tribe of Uzbeks, originally from the Golden horde, arrived in this region.

== Khanate period ==
=== Foundation ===
The founding of the Kara-Kyrgyz Khanate emerged from the growing political instability in Central Asia during the 19th century, as the Kyrgyz tribes sought unity in response to the geopolitical concerns over the weakening of the Kokand Khanate and the expanding Russian Empire who began to pose a serious threat. In the summer of 1842, a kurultai held near Kochkor brought together northern Kyrgyz tribal elites, who agreed to unite under the leadership of the influential Sarybagysh chief Ormon Niyazbek uulu. Following ancient Kyrgyz nomadic traditions, Ormon was ceremonially crowned with a tebetei, dressed in a traditional Kyrgyz clothing, placed on a white felt, and recognized as the supreme ruler of the northern Kyrgyz tribes. After his coronation, Ormon strengthened the new khanate by introducing the Ormon ukuu legal code, organizing a military force, establishing diplomatic missions, and building fortified strongholds. Rejecting Kokand authority and tribute demands, Ormon launched campaigns against Kokand fortresses in Issyk-Kul, Naryn, Bishkek, and Balykchy between 1842 and 1844, successfully driving out Kokand influence and solidifying the independence and authority of the newly founded Kyrgyz state.

=== Downfall ===
Despite the earlier unification effort made by Ormon Khan, the decline of the Kara-Kyrgyz Khanate started to occur in the 1850s with a destructive internal conflict between the ruling Sarybagysh tribe and the Bugu tribe over territorial disputes, political rivalry, and growing dissatisfaction with Sarybagysh dominance. The war culminated in the defeat and capture of Ormon Khan near Issyk-Kul, where he was mortally wounded by the Bugu leader Balbay-baatyr and died shortly afterward. Although Ormon's sons, Ümötaaly and Töregeldi, launched brutal reprisals against the Bugu and temporarily defeated them, the conflict weakened Kyrgyz unity and pushed the Bugu to seek protection from the Russian Empire, becoming Russian subjects. This opened the way for Russian expansion into Kyrgyz lands, as the empire established military outposts, exploited tribal divisions, and gradually subdued the remaining resistance. After Ormon's death, Ümötaaly continued resisting Russian conquest throughout the 1860s, fighting alongside Kokand allies and attacking Russian forces in Naryn and At-Bashy, but increasing pressure from both Russia and regional powers eventually forced him to surrender in 1867. His submission formally ended the Kara-Kyrgyz Khanate, and Russian colonial administration replaced the traditional tribal political system with a new community-based governance structure under imperial control.

== Russian Empire: 1876–1917 ==
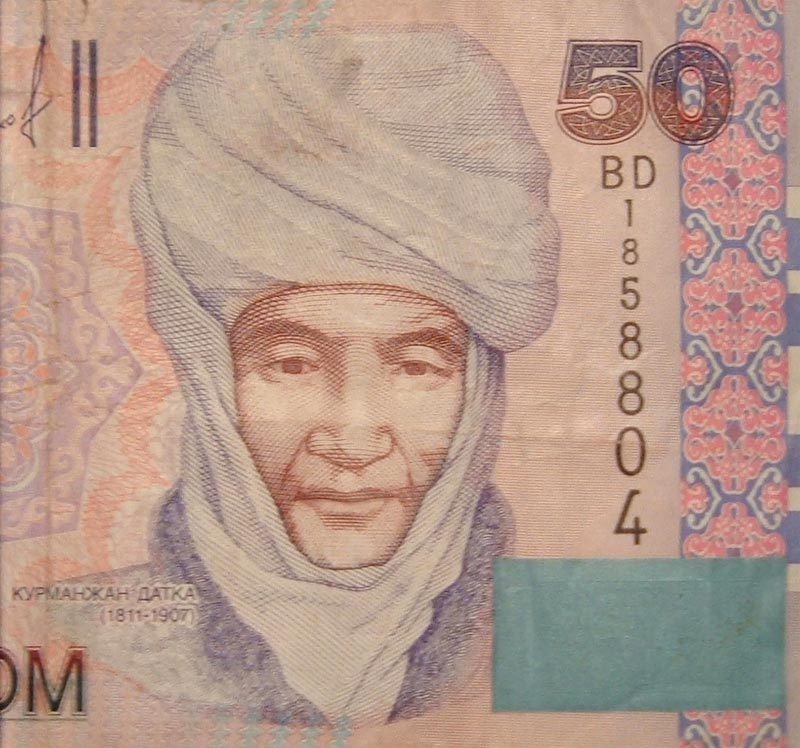
A 50-Kyrgyzstan som banknote representing Kurmanjan Datka.

In 1775, Atake Tynay Biy Uulu, one of the leaders of Sarybagysh tribe, established first diplomatic ties with the Russian Empire by sending his envoys to Catherine the Great in Saint Petersburg. In the early 19th century, the territory of Kyrgyzstan came under the control of the Khanate of Kokand, but the territory was occupied and formally annexed by the Russian Empire in 1876. The Russian takeover instigated numerous revolts against tsarist authority, and many Kyrgyz opted to move into the Pamir Mountains and into Afghanistan. The suppression of the 1916 rebellion in Central Asia, triggered by the Russian imposition of the military draft on the Kyrgyz and other Central Asian peoples, caused many Kyrgyz to flee to China.

== The Soviet Era: 1917–1991 ==
Soviet power was initially established in the region in 1918, and in 1924, the Kara-Kyrgyz Autonomous Oblast was created within the Russian SFSR. (The term Kara-Kyrgyz was used until the mid-1920s by the Russians to distinguish them from the Kazakhs, who were also referred to as Kyrgyz.) In 1926, it became the Kirghiz Autonomous Soviet Socialist Republic. On 5 December 1936, the Kirghiz Soviet Socialist Republic (SSR) was established as a Union Republic of the USSR.

Flag of Kyrgyz SSR

During the 1920s, Kyrgyzstan saw considerable cultural, educational, and social change. Economic and social development also was notable. Literacy increased, and a standard literary language was introduced. The Kyrgyz language belongs to the Kipchak Turkic group of languages. In 1924, an Arabic-based Kyrgyz alphabet was introduced, which was replaced by Latin script in 1928. In 1941 Cyrillic script was adopted. Many aspects of the Kyrgyz national culture were retained despite suppression of nationalist activity under Joseph Stalin, who controlled the Soviet Union from the late 1920s until 1953.

Modern Kyrgyz religious affiliation is eclectically Muslim for a majority of the population. Typical Kyrgyz families vary in their devotion to Islam.

Russian and Kyrgyz cultures differ about family, religious identity, and social structure. Kyrgyzstan is a country in transition. The current social dilemma is one that has emerged from the controlling body mainly relying on classic Russian ethnicities, to Kyrgyz or Turkic ethnic groups shaping and forming the infrastructure of Kyrgyzstan. This has resulted in a measurable degree of instability and chaos associated with a social transition.

The ancestral Kyrgyz social structure was dominated by nomadic traditions, governing political philosophies, and socialization. As classical Russian ethnic groups were injected into the Soviet Republic of Kyrgyzstan, the urbanization process began and was mainly authored by the Russian communities placed within the Soviet Republic, mostly by policies created by the communist party. It is unclear why these policies were created; it is only clear that they forced Russians of certain descent to populate the Republic.

=== Perestroika and Glasnost. Towards independence: 1985–1991 ===
On 11 March 1985 Mikhail Gorbachev was chosen by the Politburo as the new General Secretary of the Communist Party of the Soviet Union. Gorbachev immediately launched his new liberalizing policies of glasnost and perestroika, although they had little immediate impact on the political climate in Kyrgyzstan. On 2 November 1985 Gorbachev replaced Turdakun Usubaliyev the First Secretary of the Communist Party of Kirghizia, who had been in power for 24 years, with Absamat Masaliyev. The republic's press was permitted to adopt a more liberal stance and to establish a new publication, Literaturny Kyrgyzstan, by the Union of Writers. Unofficial political groups were forbidden, but several groups that emerged in 1989 to deal with an acute housing crisis were permitted to function.

Gorbachev's policy of separating Party and State began to impact at the Soviet Republic level in early 1991 when each SSR held competitive elections to their respective legislative Supreme Soviets, shortly after the CPSU had given up its 'leading role'. This meant that real local power moved from the position of Communist Party Leader to that of Chairman of the Supreme Soviet, the official Head of State of the SSR. Between January and April 1990, each of the Communist Party leaders of the five states of Soviet Central Asia assumed the position of Chairman of the Supreme Soviet in their respective SSRs without any difficulty from the still weak opposition forces in the region.

In Kirghizia the 1990 elections were held on 25 February, with a second round on 7 April. As the Communists were the only political party contesting the elections it is not surprising that they received 90% of the vote. Absamat Masaliyev the Communist leader was voted by the new Parliament as Chairman of the Supreme Soviet of Kirghizia on 10 April 1990.

However events quickly began to slip from the Communists control. On 1 May 1990 the opposition groups held their first big demonstration in Frunze in competition with the officially sanctioned May Day celebrations, and on 25–26 May 1990 the opposition groups formed the Kyrgyzstan Democratic Movement as a bloc of several anti-Communist political parties, movements and nongovernment organizations. Then on 4 June 1990, ethnic tensions between Uzbeks and Kyrgyz surfaced in an area of the Osh Region where Uzbeks form a majority of the population. Violent confrontations ensued, and a state of emergency and curfew were introduced. Order was not restored until August 1990.

The Kyrgyzstan Democratic Movement swiftly developed into a significant political force with growing support in parliament. On 27 October 1990 in an upset victory, Askar Akayev, the president of the Kyrgyz Academy of Sciences and reformist Communist Party member, was elected to the newly created presidency defeating Communist Party leader Absamat Masaliyev. Kirghizia was the only one of the five states of Soviet Central Asia that voted their established Communist leadership out of power in 1990.

=== Priority over Soviet Union laws and negotiations on a new Treaty ===
On 15 December 1990, the Supreme Soviet voted to change the republic's name to the Republic of Kyrgyzstan. In January 1991, Akayev introduced new government structures and appointed a government consisting mainly of younger, reform-oriented politicians. On 5 February 1991, the capital's name, Frunze, was changed to Bishkek.

Despite these moves toward independence, economic realities seemed to work against secession from the Soviet Union In a referendum on the preservation of the USSR, in March 1991, 88.7% of the voters approved a proposal to remain part of the union as a "renewed federation."

=== Soviet coup attempt, the Transition Period and the end of the Soviet Union ===
On 19 August 1991, when the State Emergency Committee assumed power in Moscow, there was an attempt to depose Akayev in Kyrgyzstan. After the coup collapsed the following week, Akayev and Vice President German Kuznetsov announced their resignations from the Communist Party of the Soviet Union (CPSU), and the entire politburo and secretariat resigned. This was followed by the Supreme Soviet vote declaring independence from the Soviet Union on 31 August 1991, becoming the first of the five Republics of Soviet Central Asia to break away.

== Independence and the Akayev presidency: 1991–2005 ==
Kyrgyz was announced as the state language in September 1991. In October 1991, Akayev ran unopposed and was elected President of the new independent republic by direct ballot, receiving 95% of the votes cast.

On 18 October 1991, in the St. George Hall of the Grand Kremlin Palace Mikhail Gorbachev and the leaders of eight Union republics (excluding Ukraine, Moldova, Georgia and Azerbaijan) signed the Treaty on the Economic Community. According to the text, even before the disintegration of the Soviet Union and regardless of the fate of the Soviet Union, an economic community is being created by independent states in order to form a single market and conduct a coordinated economic policy as an essential condition for overcoming the crisis, preserving a single currency and free movement of goods and services. The treaty was signed by the heads of Armenia, Belarus, Kazakhstan, Kyrgyzstan, Russia, Tajikistan, Turkmenistan, Uzbekistan and the president of the Union of Soviet Socialist Republics Mikhail Gorbachev, but was not ratified and implemented.

=== Independent country and the Commonwealth ===
Post-Soviet countries have signed a series of treaties and agreements to settle the legacy of the former Soviet Union multilaterally and bilaterally.

On 21 December 1991, Kyrgyzstan formally entered the new Commonwealth of Independent States (CIS).

As in many former Soviet republics, after Kyrgyzstan regained independence in August 1991 many individuals, organizations, and political parties sought to reestablish (and, to a certain extent, to create from scratch) a Kyrgyz national cultural identity; often one that included a backlash against Russians.

In 1993, allegations of corruption against Akayev's closest political associates blossomed into a major scandal. One of those accused of improprieties was Prime Minister Tursunbek Chyngyshev, who was dismissed for ethical reasons in December. Following Chyngyshev's dismissal, Akayev dismissed the government and called upon the last communist premier, Apas Djumagulov, to form a new one. In January 1994, Akayev initiated a referendum asking for a renewed mandate to complete his term of office. He received 96.2% of the vote.

A new constitution was passed by the parliament in May 1993 and the Republic of Kyrgyzstan was renamed the Kyrgyz Republic. In 1994, however, the parliament failed to produce a quorum for its last scheduled session prior to the expiration of its term in February 1995. President Akayev was widely accused of having manipulated a boycott by a majority of the parliamentarians. Akayev, in turn, asserted that the communists had caused a political crisis by preventing the legislature from fulfilling its role. Akayev scheduled an October 1994 referendum, overwhelmingly approved by voters, which proposed two amendments to the constitution—one that would allow the constitution to be amended by means of a referendum, and the other creating a new bicameral parliament called the Jogorku Kenesh.

Elections for the two legislative chambers—a 35-seat full-time assembly and a 70-seat part-time assembly—were held in February 1995 after campaigns considered remarkably free and open by most international observers, although the election-day proceedings were marred by widespread irregularities. Independent candidates won most of the seats, suggesting that personalities prevailed over ideologies. The new parliament convened its initial session in March 1995. One of its first orders of business was the approval of the precise constitutional language on the role of the legislature.

On 24 December 1995, President Akayev was reelected for another 5-year term with wide support (75% of vote) over two opposing candidates. He used government resources and state-owned media to carry out his campaign. Three (out of six) candidates were de-registered shortly before the election.

A February 1996 referendum—in violation of the constitution and the law on referendums—amended the constitution to give President Akayev more power. Although the changes gave the president the power to dissolve parliament, it also more clearly defined the parliament's powers. Since that time, the parliament has demonstrated real independence from the executive branch.

An October 1998 referendum approved constitutional changes, including increasing the number of deputies in the lower house, reducing the number of deputies in the upper house, providing for 25% of lower house deputies to be elected by party lists, rolling back parliamentary immunity, introducing private property, prohibiting adoption of laws restricting freedom of speech and mass media, and reforming the state budget.

Two rounds of parliamentary elections were held on 20 February 2000, and 12 March 2000. The Organization for Security and Cooperation in Europe (OSCE) reported that the elections failed to comply with commitments to free and fair elections and hence were invalid. Questionable judicial proceedings against opposition candidates and parties limited the choice of candidates available to Kyrgyz voters, while state-controlled media only reported favorably on official candidates. Government officials put pressure on independent media outlets that favored the opposition. The presidential election that followed later in 2000 also was marred by irregularities and was not declared free and fair by international observers. In December 2001, through a constitutional amendment, the Russian language was given official status.

The OSCE found that the parliamentary elections held on 27 February and 13 March 2005 failed to comply with commitments to free and fair elections; however, there were improvements over the 2000 elections, notably the use of indelible ink, transparent ballot boxes, and generally good access by election observers.

== Tulip Revolution: 2005 ==
Sporadic protests against perceived manipulation and fraud during the elections of 27 February 2005, erupted into widespread calls for the government to resign, which started in the southern provinces. On March 24, 15000 pro-opposition demonstrators in Bishkek called for the resignation of the President and his regime. Protesters seized the main government building, and Akayev hurriedly fled the country, first to neighboring Kazakhstan and then to Moscow. Initially refusing to resign and denouncing the events as a coup, he subsequently resigned his office on 4 April.

== Bakiyev presidency: 2005–2010 ==
Kurmanbek Bakiyev won the 10 July ballot for the presidential election with 89% of the vote with a 53% turnout. Bakiyev's term in office was marred by the murder of several prominent politicians, prison riots, economic ills and battles for control of lucrative businesses. In 2006, Bakiyev faced a political crisis as thousands of people participated in a series of protests in Bishkek. He was accused of not following through with his promises to limit presidential power, give more authority to parliament and the prime minister, and eradicate corruption and crime. Bakiyev claimed that the opposition was plotting a coup against him.

In April 2007, the opposition held protests demanding Bakiyev's resignation, with a large protest beginning on 11 April in Bishkek. Bakiyev signed constitutional amendments to reduce his own power on 10 April, but the protest went ahead, with protesters saying that they would remain until he resigned. Clashes broke out between protesters and police on 19 April, after which the protests ended.

Bakiyev was re-elected in the 2009 presidential election. After the re-election in 2009, some people in Kyrgyzstan said that he would now deal with political and economic reform. Others were skeptical. The Eurasian Daily Monitor wrote on 10 September that his style resembled other leaders such as Vladimir Putin and Nursultan Nazarbayev. However, he lacked resources and Kyrgyz people were anxious about the risk of renewed power shortages and blackouts like in the winter 2008–2009.

During the winter of 2010 Kyrgyzstan has suffered from rolling blackouts and cutoffs occurring regularly while energy prices have risen.

== Revolution 2010 ==
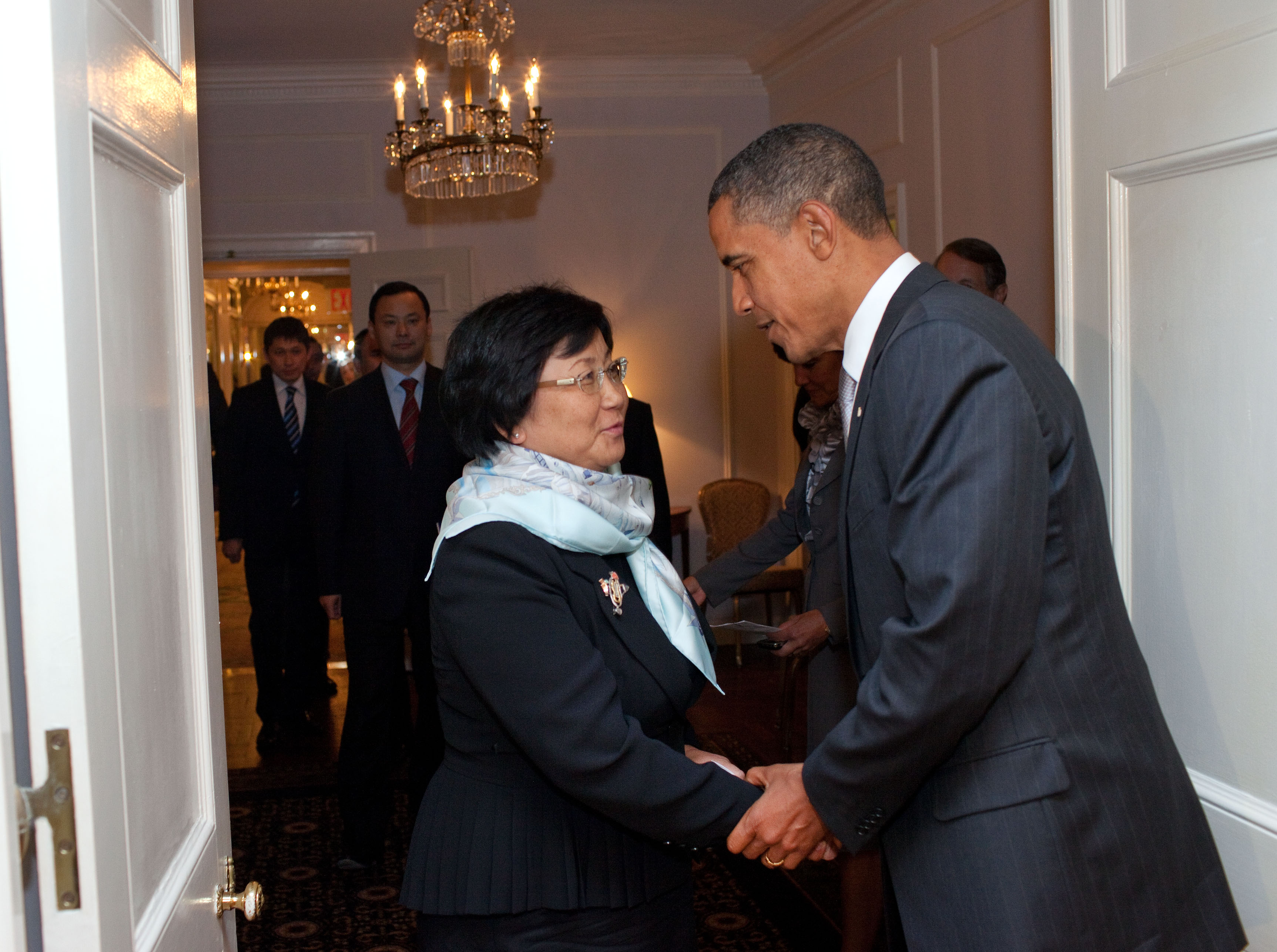
President Obama Greets Kyrgyzstan President Otunbayeva

The arrest of an opposition figure on 6 April 2010 in the town of Talas led opposition supporters to protest. The protestors took control of a governmental building, demanding a new government. Riot police were sent from Bishkek, and managed to temporarily regain control of the building. Later the same day several more opposition figures were arrested, while the government claimed to have regained control of the situation. The following day, however, hundreds of opposition supporters gathered in Bishkek and marched on the government headquarters. Security personnel attempted to disperse the protestors with the use of stun grenades and live rounds, at the cost of dozens of lives. The protests continued, however, resulting in the flight of President Bakiyev to his southern stronghold of Jalal-Abad, and the freeing later the same day of the arrested opposition figures. A new government was formed under opposition leader Roza Otunbayeva, while Bakiyev remained for several days in southern Kyrgyzstan, before fleeing to Belarus, where he was given asylum by President Lukashenko. The new interim government held consultations on a new constitution, intended to increase the powers of the parliament and reduce those of the president. A referendum was held on the resulting document on 27 June 2010, and was approved by over 90% of voters, with a turnout of 72%. Elections were subsequently held on 10 October 2010. These elections resulted in five parties reaching the 5% threshold necessary to enter parliament.

== Atambayev presidency: 2011-to 2017 ==
Almazbek Atambayev ran in 2011 to succeed Roza Otunbayeva as President of Kyrgyzstan. On election day, 30 October 2011, he won in a landslide, defeating Adakhan Madumarov from the Butun Kyrgyzstan party and Kamchybek Tashiev from the Ata-Zhurt party with 63% of the vote, and with about 60% of the eligible Kyrgyz population voting.

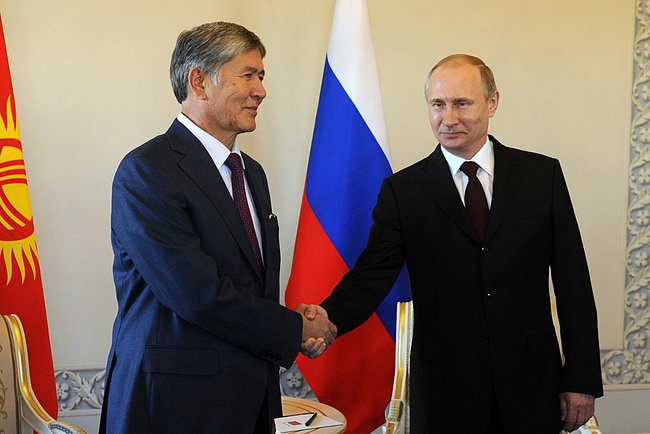
Almazbek Atambayev with President of Russia Vladimir Putin on 16 March 2015

In 2011 soon after becoming president, Atambayev travelled to Turkey and signed an agreement with the Turkish President agreeing to increase trade from $300 million in 2011 to $1 billion by 2015, with Turkey also agreeing to attract Turkish investment to Kyrgyzstan to the amount of $450 million within the next few years.

Atambayev has repeatedly presented himself as a pro-Russian politician. He positively supports Kyrgyzstan's Membership of the Russian led Eurasian Customs Union and secured the withdrawal of the American military base from the country in 2014. He has spoken of the need for closer economic relations with Russia, which temporarily employs about 500,000 citizens of Kyrgyzstan; however, he also expressed his wish to achieve greater economic and energy independence from it.

== Jeenbekov presidency: 2017–2020 ==
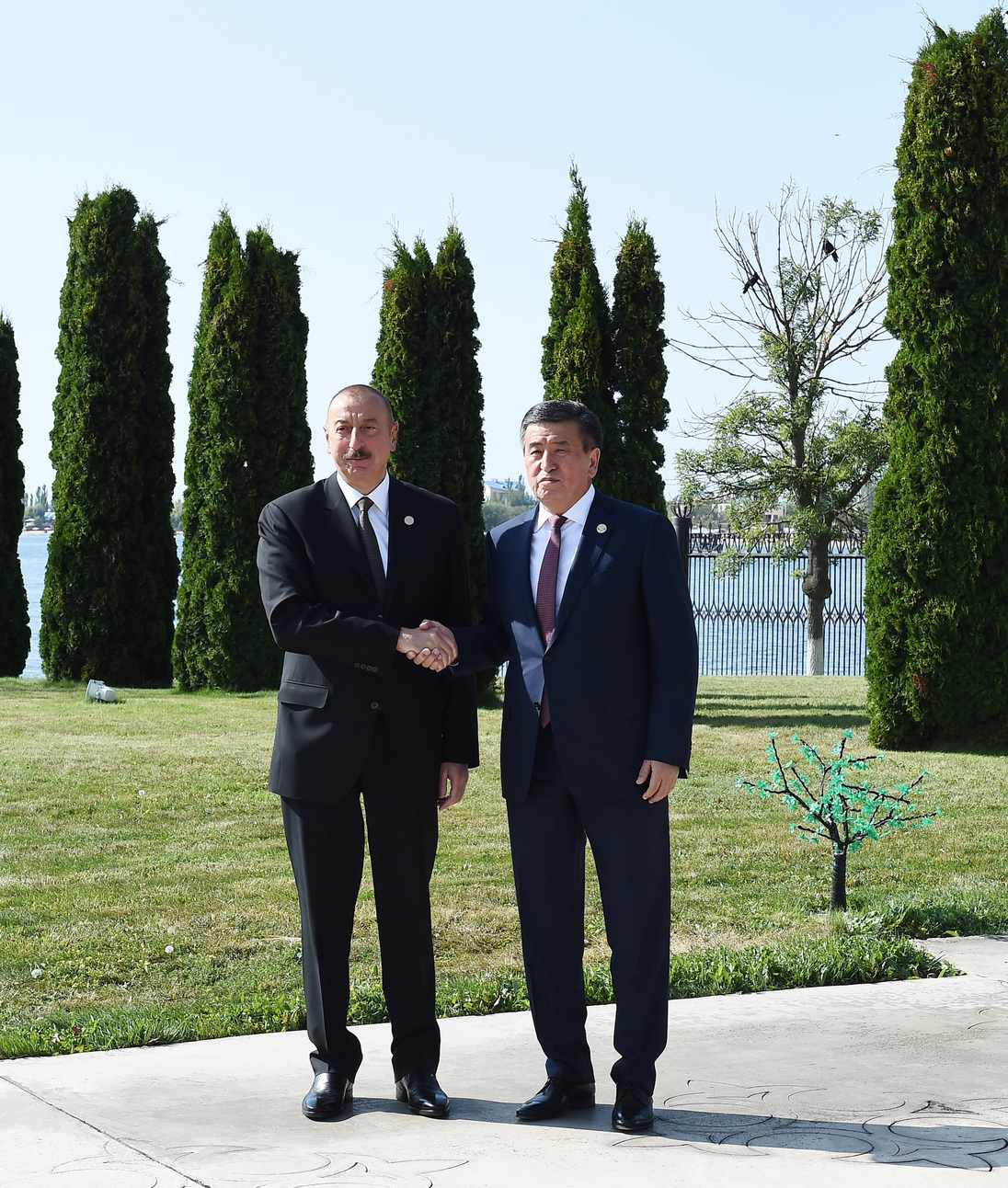
Jeenbekov with Azerbaijani President Ilham Aliyev

Sooronbay Jeenbekov was sworn in as president on 24 November 2017 at the Ala Archa State Residence. In the hours since assuming office, he made his first decree to confer the title of Hero of the Kyrgyz Republic to his predecessor. The following May, he conducted his first foreign visit after assuming the presidency was to Russia where he met with Vladimir Putin. In April 2018, Jeenbekov fired Prime Minister Sapar Isakov and his entire government following a vote of no confidence from Supreme Council.

In his first year, Jeenbekov participated in 30 international meetings, where he signed a total of 77 bilateral agreements and 414 multilateral documents. That same year, he ordered the foreign ministry to establish diplomatic relations with four foreign countries. The draft of a new co-operation agreement with the United States is currently being reconciled.

Since Jeenbekov took power, he has had a somewhat adversarial relationship with former President Atambayev, who strongly backed Jeenbekov against his opponent Ömürbek Babanov during the 2017 election, even referring to comparing himself as an "older brother" to Jeenbekov when referring to their relationship. Despite this, a rift grew between the two politicians as Atambayev became more involved in politics, eventually rising to the Chairmanship of the Social Democratic Party of Kyrgyzstan, of which Jeenbekov is a member of. While in this post, he criticized Jeenbekov for his handling many controversies and state emergencies, including the Bishkek power plant failure and his refusal to force his brother to resign from parliament. In early April 2018, Jeenbekov dismissed two high-ranking officials in the State Committee for National Security (GKNB) who are considered to be close to Atambayev, which was seen as an apparent jab at Atambayev and his former government. Jeenbekov has on many occasions accused Atambayev of indirectly trying to influence his presidency, saying in November 2018 that he has attempted to turn him into "a puppet leader through some third individuals" Even with the accusations, he denies any type of rivalry with the former president, saying the following month that he "does not consider anyone a rival".

== October 2020 protests ==
Mass protests began on 5 October 2020 in response to the parliamentary election that was perceived by protestors as unfair. In the early morning of 6 October 2020, the protesters reclaimed control of the Ala-Too Square in central Bishkek. They also managed to seize the White House and Supreme Council buildings nearby, throwing paper from windows and setting them on fire, also entering the President's offices. A protestor died and 590 others were injured. Protestors freed former president Almazbek Atambayev and opposition politician Sadyr Japarov from prison.

On 6 October, following the protests, the electoral authorities in the country annulled the results of the parliamentary elections. Likely due to pressure from the protest, Prime Minister Kubatbek Boronov resigned, citing parliamentary deputy Myktybek Abdyldayev as the new speaker. Following the resignation of Prime Minister Boronov, former lawmaker Sadyr Japarov was appointed to replace him. Opposition parties rejected the legitimacy of Japarov's status and instead put forward their own candidate for prime minister, Tilek Toktogaziyev. Japarov claimed that he was already the "legitimate prime minister" and that he was appointed by "the parliament's majority."

President Sooronbay Jeenbekov resigned on 15 October 2020, leading Japarov to declare himself as acting president. Despite the Kyrgyzstan Constitution stating that the speaker of the Supreme Council should succeed the role, Kanatbek Isaev refused to assume office, resulting in Japarov becoming the acting president.

== Japarov presidency: 2021–present ==
Sadyr Japarov resigned his post of prime minister to run for the presidency in January 2021. He successfully defeated Adakhan Madumarov in a landslide win and assumed office on 28 January 2021.

A constitutional referendum was held in Kyrgyzstan on 11 April 2021. The draft new constitution adopted by the referendum replaces the parliamentary system with a presidential one, with presidents limited to two five year terms instead of a single six-year term.

== See also ==
- Dissolution of the Soviet Union
- Yenisei Kyrgyz Khaganate
- Kyrgyz Khanate
- History of Asia
- History of Central Asia
- Kokand Khanate
- Sokh fortress
- History of the Soviet Union
- Leadership of Communist Kyrgyzstan
- Kirghiz Soviet Socialist Republic
- Politics of Kyrgyzstan
- President of Kyrgyzstan
- Prime Minister of Kyrgyzstan
- Soviet Central Asia
- Tulip Revolution
