= Umetaaly =

Umetaaly Ormon uulu
- Khan of all Kyrgyz (disputed)
- Born: c. 1810/12; Issyk-Kul Region
- Died: c. 1879; Küngöy region, Russian Turkestan
- Issue: Jumgalbay-Cholok
- Tribe: Sarybagysh
- Father: Ormon Khan
- Religion: Islam

Umetaaly or Ümötaly Ormon uulu (Kyrgyz: Үмөтаалы Ормон уулу; c. 1810/12–1879) was the eldest son of Ormon Khan and a prominent yet controversial figure in Kyrgyz history due to his violent reputation. He played a significant role in governance and resistance during a turbulent period marked by external threats and internal conflicts.

== Life ==
During the reign of Ormon Khan, Umetaaly began to assume leadership responsibilities over the Kyrgyz people. Following Ormon Khan's victory over Kenesary Sultan in 1848, Umetaaly was sent alongside Borombay, Jantay, and Jangarach to negotiate with Russian authorities. As Ormon strengthened his ties with the Russian Empire, Umetaaly maintained relations with the Russian head of the Ala-Too district.

Between 1855 and 1860, Umetaaly headed the Sarybagysh tribe during the conflict with the Bugu tribe, this conflict was sparked by the assassination of Ormon Khan. Although the war was officially framed as a revenge campaign, Umetaaly sought to restore his father's authority. His strict nature of leadership became particularly evident during the clashes between the Bugu and Sarybagysh tribes, which concluded after negotiations to release the figure Töregeldi.

In the 19th century, Umetaaly led the remnants of his father's Khanate against the enroaching Russian Empire, In 1860, when Captain Venyukov's detachment arrived with the aim of capturing the Sarybagysh leaders and punishing them, Umetaaly and Töregeldi, along with their people, moved to the Naryn and At-Bashy regions, during his travel to Naryn, he took a Russian woman as a wife and had a son named Jumgalbay-Cholok. That same year, Umetaaly supported Alimbek Datka during his summer-autumn Kastek and Uzun-Agach battles, which were fought between the Russians and Kokand. When Alimbek was pursued by Kokand's ruler Malla Khan, he sought refuge in the Naryn region in 1861, Umetaaly provided him with significant assistance. This situation suggests that it is evident that the Kara-Kyrgyz Khanate continued to exist during this period. Additionally, the prominent Solto leader, Baytik Kanai uulu (1822–1886), maintained a close relationship with Umetaaly. In a letter to the Russian authorities in February 1863, Baytik reported that Umetaaly had dealt with the Kokand leader, Rakhmatulla, who had been killed at the Pishpek fortress. Baytik mentioned: "After my letter, Umetaaly arrived and joined us. Now, our words and counsel are united." Moreover, a recently discovered letter from Umetaaly to the Issyk-Kul Kyrgyz leaders, written in early 1861, further confirms this connection. In the letter, Umetaaly addresses his contemporaries, stating: “Our government (meaning our state) sends greetings to the noble people of the nomads,” and provides the following instructions: “If a Muslim son believes in God and the Prophet, let him serve the Khan with all his heart. If not, when the great spring arrives, he should take up arms against the enemies of Islam. As for the Russian infidels, I will wage war against them... If you are the people, send your envoy to my court to convey your words to the Khan. Otherwise, let it be known to me”.

By 1862, the Sarybagysh tribe was compelled to formally recognize Russian authority. However, in the summer of 1863, Umetaaly attacked a Russian supply convoy led by Sub-Lieutenant Zubarev in the Naryn region. On June 19, with the support of his brother Chargyn and Osmond Taylak uulu,Umetaaly destroyed a bridge over the Naryn River at Eki-Chat and attacked Zubarev's forces. When Captain Protsenko's troops arrived on June 21, Umetaaly and his men retreated to Aksai. During Alimkul Atalyk's campaign from Toguz-Toro to Kochkor in 1864, Umetaaly came to join his campaign. However, when the Russians captured Shymkent, which was under Kokand rule, Alimkul returned to Kokand. Subsequently, Umetaaly sought refuge from the Russians, taking Chargyn and Osmond with him to the mountains near Kashgar.

Between 1864 and 1867, Umetaaly dominated the area from At-Bashy and Naryn to Kashgar, where he looted Kokand and Kashgar caravans and attacked Kyrgyz tribes that had accepted Russian rule. After Yakub Beg came to power in Kashgar in 1867 and began pressuring Umetaaly, combined with the Russian military expeditions led by Colonel Poltoratsky into the At-Bashy and Chatyr-Köl regions that summer, Umetaaly soutght to submit to Russian authority. In late 1867, he declared his full allegiance to the Russian government, agreeing to pay compensation of 375 horses or 7,500 rubles for the casualties caused by his resistance. This payment was fully paid by 1868.

In 1868, the Russian government adopted the "Regulations on Governing the Turkestan Region," implementing administrative reforms where a manap no longer governed a single tribe but elected leaders managed groups of 1,000 households. Following this reform, Umetaaly withdrew his interactions with Russian authorities and moved to a quiet life. He died in 1879 near the Küngöy region.
