= Atake Tynay Biy Uulu =

Atake Tynay Biy uulu Kyrgyz: Атаке Тынай бий уулу
- Unified Biy; Batyr

Unified Biy of the North Kyrgyz
- Reign: 1780–1787
- Predecessor: Sadyr Khan
- Successor: Esenkul Biy
- Born: 1738
- Died: Around 1787
- Issue: Karabek; Tashtanbek; Abylai; Soltonoy
- Dynasty: Sarybagysh
- Father: Tynay Biy (father)
- Religion: Sunni Islam

Atake Tynay Biy uulu (Kyrgyz: Атаке Тынай бий уулу), better known as Atake Biy (Kyrgyz: Атаке бий), or Atake Batyr (Kyrgyz: Атаке баатыр; 1738, Andijan region - around 1787) was the Unified Biy of the North Kyrgyz and known for establishing first diplomatic ties between northern Kyrgyz and Russian Empire from 1785 to 1787. On agreement with other Kyrgyz leaders he sent his envoys to Saint Petersburg to deliver a letter to Catherine the Great. The Empress was favorable to the ambassadors and, on her behalf, knyaz A.A.Vyazemskiy sent a response to Atake Biy stating that his proposals of friendship had been accepted. When the Kyrgyz joined the Russian Empire, the volost inhabited by descendants of Atake Batyr it was named "Atake Volost".

== Biography and beginning ==
In the first half of the 18th century, the Dzungar Khanate conquered the Issyk-Kul, Chui and Talas regions, inhabited by the Kyrgyz. It was a very difficult period for the Kyrgyz people. The attack of the Jungars (Kalmaks) on the Kyrgyz was very cruel and was accompanied by extreme cruelty and bloodshed. The Kyrgyz tribes, unable to withstand the large military forces of the powerful Dzungar Khanate, were forced to leave their homeland and migrate to Ferghana. Atake biy's father, Tynay, moved with the people to the area near the town of Andijan. Atake Biy was born in 1738 and spent his childhood in the Andijan region. From an early age he was smart and was interested in military art, grew up in the Andjiyan region, trained with his father's commander Er Soltonoy. Attack learns to throw spears on horseback. The plight of his people and the fact that his homeland was in the hands of the enemy worried young Atake, and he wanted to free his lands in the future. To achieve this goal, he, along with the son of the head of the Saruu tribe, Berdike, led a group of young men. He taught them to ride horses, draw bows and shoot guns. So he wanted to liberate the Kyrgyz lands from the Dzungars. These exploits of Atake and Berdike became proof of their love for their homeland and hatred for their enemies. So they began the liberation movement against the invaders.

== Kyrgyz-Dzungarian War ==
After the death of Galdan Tseren, Khan of the Dzungars, a civil war broke out in the Khanate between the heirs to his throne. This situation led to an irreconcilable conflict, which weakened the military and economic power of the state.

Taking advantage of the situation, the northern Kyrgyz tribes temporarily living in Andijan began to move to the North of Kyrgyzstan under the leadership of Atake Batyr and Berdike Batyr. Passing through Toguz-Toro, they reached Talas and, as a result of hostilities, liberated the region.

In the lower reaches of the Chu river, the Dzungars gathered their last forces and blocked the path of the Kyrgyz pursuers. After a bloody battle, the Dzungarian troops led by Dorgul retreated to the east of the Chüy Valley. Atake Batyr and Berdike Batyr, together with the troops, went to liberate the east. On the Kök-Jar pasture, they met with the enemies and the battle began. In this battle, Atake Batyr wounded Dorgul and executed his head. The army of the Dzungars was completely destroyed and they were expelled from the Chüy Valley.

To protect the liberated regions, it was decided to leave some Batyrs for protection. The south of the Chüy valley was under the protection of Jaiyl Batyr, and the north was under the protection of Koshoi Batyr. The south of Talas was under the protection of Sabyr Batyr, and the north and center of the region were under the protection of Itim Batyr and Er Soltonoy.

== Kurultai and the first ties with Russia ==
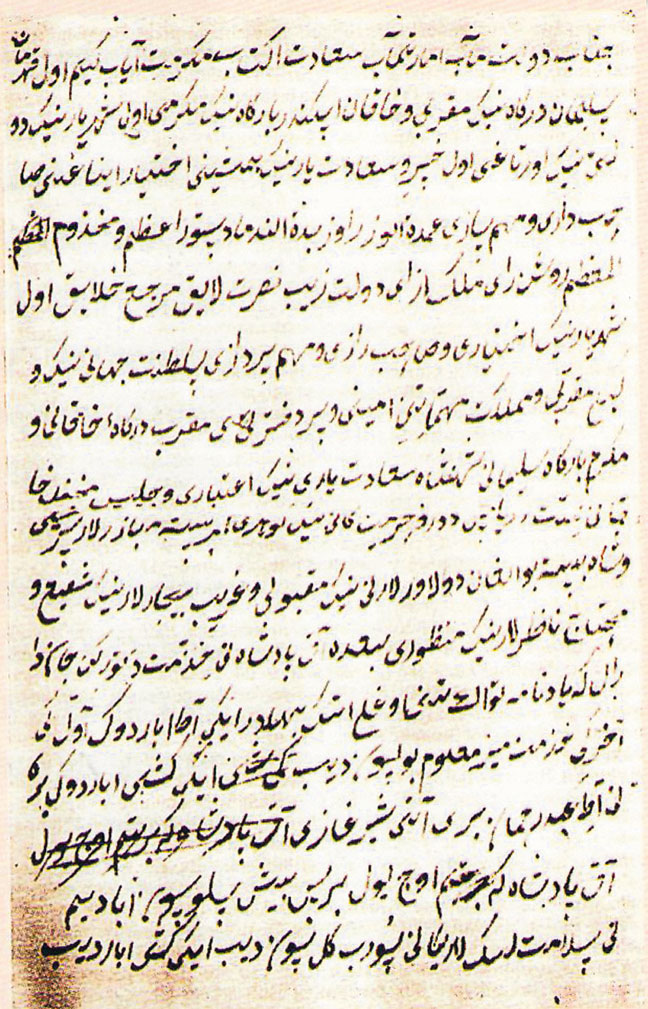
Atake Biy's letter to the Russian Empress Catherine II

Atake Biy understood that the Kyrgyz were surrounded on all sides by countries ready to seize them at any moment, and that only decisive measures could prevent the disappearance of the Kyrgyz as a people, preserve its independence, so he decided to convene the rulers of the tribes of the Northern Kyrgyzstan, experienced and knowledgeable people to Kurultai, and discuss the situation. The Kurultai dragged on for a long time. Biys, their wise advisers, Batyrs, aqsaqals, manaps and others made different proposals. We went through all the near and distant neighbors who could help the Kyrgyz. Finally, they all considered reasonable and justified the words of the Atake Biy: in order to fight a strong enemy, one must look for a strong ally. Then Atake Biy offered to establish ties with Russia. Atake Biy heard that the Russian Tsar had great power. His state is very large, and there are a lot of people. Russian troops are well trained, armed with rifles and cannons. “If the Kyrgyz accepted Russian citizenship, then the enemies would not dare to attack us,” he said. Some biys did not agree with this opinion, but no one offered more weighty arguments, no other way out. Kurultai decided to send an ambassador to the White Tsar. This was a truly historic decision, as it was of great importance for the future fate of the Kyrgyz people.

They decided to send Abdrakhman Kuchakov and a person close to Atake - Shergazy. Abdrakhman came to Russia as a child, along with relatives who moved there to live, lived there for many years. Later, he returned to his homeland and settled in the village of Atake. Speaking Russian, knowing the life of Russians, Abdrakhman headed the embassy. The second ambassador was the adopted son of Atake - Shergazy. They were accompanied by two warriors Atake Biy.

In the spring of 1785, the ambassadors left the territory of the Northern Kyrgyz and in the autumn of that year arrived in Siberia, and met in Omsk with the Governor General. Having received permission to enter St. Petersburg, the ambassadors set off on a long journey.

The ambassadors arrived at the royal palace on December 29, 1785. On March 15, 1786, they received an appointment with Empress Catherine II and on behalf of the Supreme Biy presented her with a gift - two horses, three leopard and five lynx dressed skins, one black-haired slave, and also handed over a letter. Catherine accepted the gifts, got acquainted with Biy's letter and granted him 600 silver rubles, Abdrakhman received 100 rubles and Shergazy 25 silver rubles. At the time, that was a lot of money. The envoys were handed a reply message written on behalf of the Empress. It reported that she was accepting Ataka Biy's offers of friendship.
