= Jantay Batyr =

Kyrgyz statesman

Jantay Karabek uulu
- Kyrgyz: Жантай Карабек уулу

Khan's personal adviser
- In office 1842–1854 Serving with Kalygul Bai uulu
- Monarch: Ormon Khan

Member of the Grand Council of the Kara-Kyrgyz Khanate
- In office 1842–1854

Personal details
- Born: c. 1794 Beysheke village, Chüy Valley
- Died: 1867 (aged 72–73) Beysheke village, Chüy Valley, Russian Empire
- Spouse: Ak Moor
- Children: Shabdan Batyr
- Parent: Karabek Batyr

Jantay Karabek uulu (Kyrgyz: Жантай Карабек уулу) better known as Jantay Batyr (Kyrgyz: Жантай Баатыр; 1794, Beysheke village, Chüy Valley – 1867, Beysheke village, Chüy Valley, Russian Empire) was a Kyrgyz statesman and public figure of the first half of the 19th century. Comes from the Tynay clan of the Sarybagysh tribe. He was a personal adviser to Ormon Khan and a member of the great council of the Kara-Kyrgyz Khanate. Participated in kurultai and at the coronation of the all-Kyrgyz Khan in 1842.
