= Mamatkul Biy =

Mamatkul Uchuko uulu Kyrgyz: Мааматкул Үчүкө уулу
- Unified Biy; Batyr
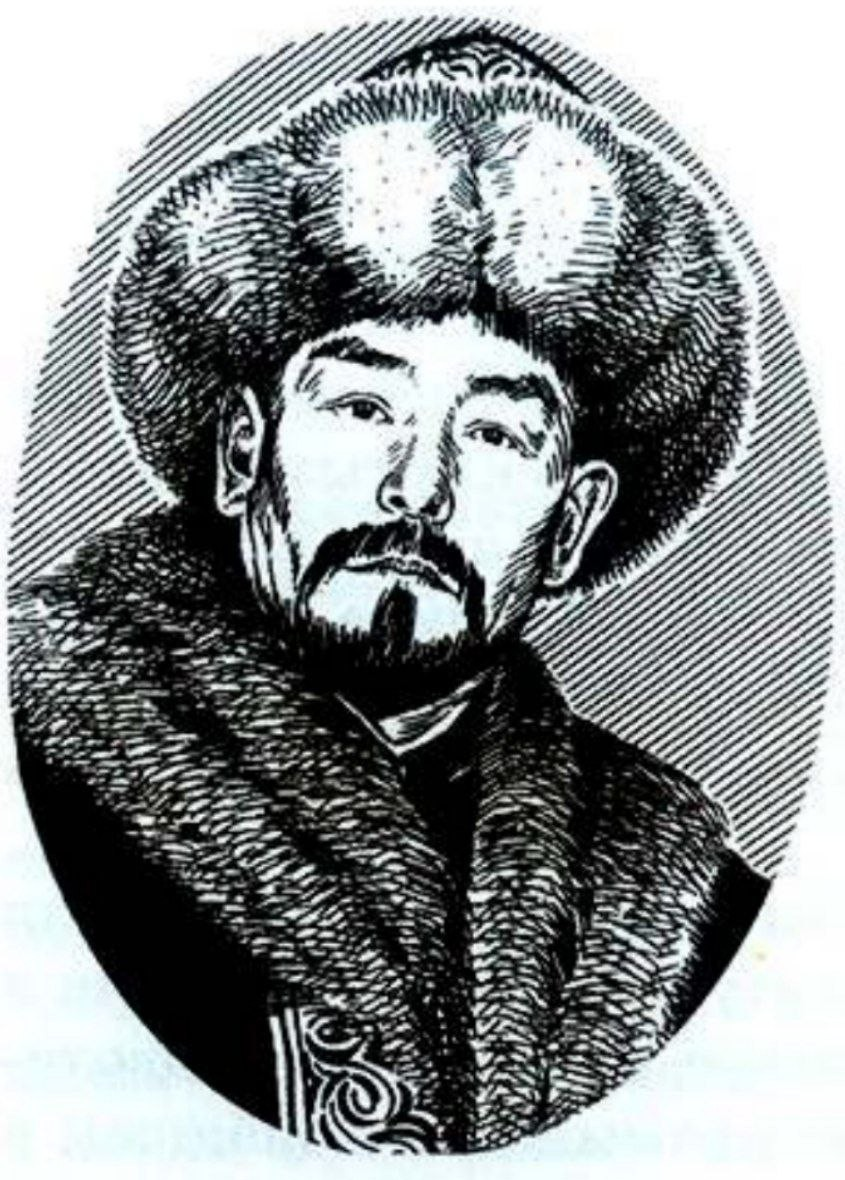

Unified Biy of the Northern Kyrgyz
- Reign: 1684–1758
- Predecessor: Kudayan Khan
- Successor: Cherikchi Biy
- Born: 1660
- Died: 1758 (aged 97–98); Ketmen-Töbö, modern Kyrgyzstan
- Spouse: Burul; Kunduz; Shaarkan
- Issue: Bolot Batyr, Temir Batyr
- Dynasty: Sarybagysh
- Father: Uchuko Batyr
- Religion: Sunni Islam

Mamatkul Uchuko uulu (Kyrgyz: Мааматкул Үчүкө уулу), better known as Mamatkul Biy (Kyrgyz: Мааматкул Бий; 1660 – 1758) was the Unified Biy of the northern Kyrgyz and one of the leaders of the people's struggle against the Dzungar Khanate.

In the 1680s, the Kyrgyz tribes were ruled by Kudayan Khan. Being a close relative of the khan, Mamatkul Biy competed with him for power, and later acted as one of the contenders for the position of the monarch. In the 1680s – early 1690s, unable to resist the Dzungar invaders, the Kyrgyz of the north migrated to the regions of the Ferghana Valley and, under the leadership of Kudayan Khan, penetrated the Issyk-Kul basin. According to historical information, Kudayan Khan died in Khujand. After that, Mamatkul Biy, having united the Kyrgyz who came to Ferghana, settled them in the upper reaches of Namangan.

Mamatkul Biy, as a representative of the Sarybagysh tribe, was elected the Supreme Biy of all the Kyrgyz tribes of the north, and Koshoi Biy (Solto), Karaboto Biy (Kytai), Maitak Biy (Kushchu) and Akbay Biy (Saruu) were personal advisers.

In 1758, in connection with the arrival of Chinese ambassadors, in order to clarify the borders of the Qing state, Mamatkul Biy sent his embassy of 7 people to China: Cherikchi Biy (head of the embassy), Sherbek Batyr, Tülkü Biy, Nyshaa Batyr, Akbay Batyr, Notsi Biy and Shükür Biy. The delegates in the same year were at the reception of the Qianlong Emperor of the Qing and resolved political and border issues. They demanded the return of the occupied lands and the Emperor promised to look into these issues. But even before these demands were met, the Kyrgyz themselves completely liberated their lands by force.

== See also ==
- Atake Tynay Biy Uulu
