= Kozhoyar-Ata =

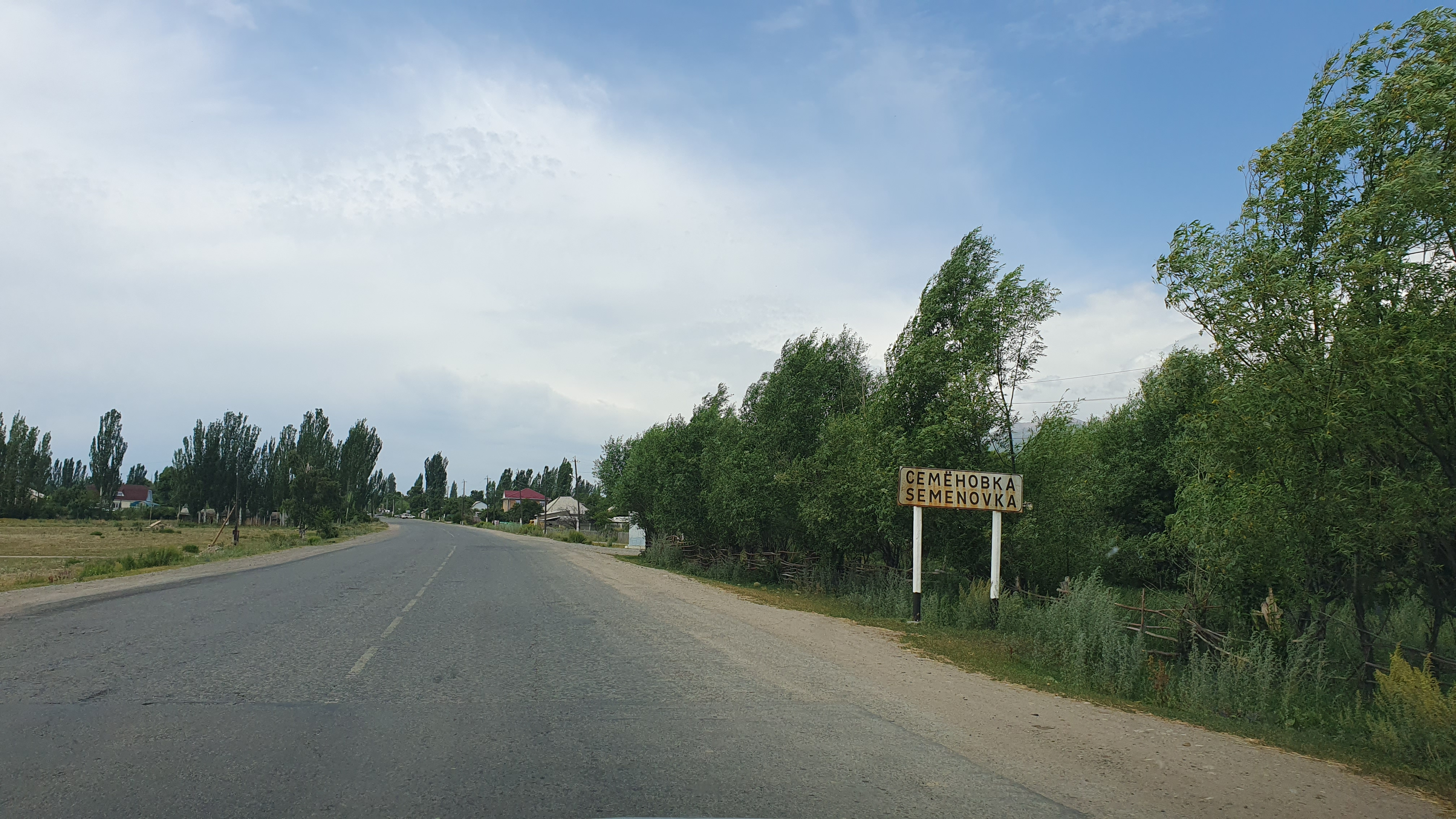

- Location within Kyrgyzstan
- Coordinates: 42°43′12″N 77°32′24″E
- Country: Kyrgyzstan
- Region: Issyk-Kul Region
- District: Issyk-Kul District
- Elevation: 1,756 m (5,761 ft)

Population (2023)
  - Total: 3,636
- Time zone: UTC+6

Kozhoyar-Ata (Kyrgyz: Кожояр-Ата) is a village in the Issyk-Kul Region of Kyrgyzstan. It is part of the Issyk-Kul District. Its population was 3,439 in 2021.

It is the start of an asphalt road that leads up the Chon Ak-soo valley to a ski resort. Nearby are Scythian burial mounds from the 5th-3rd centuries and a dacha built for Leonid Brezhnev (he used it only once). West on highway A363 is Grigor'evka, and east Anan'evo.
