= Semyonov Peak =

Mountain in Kyrgyzstan

- Pik Semyonova
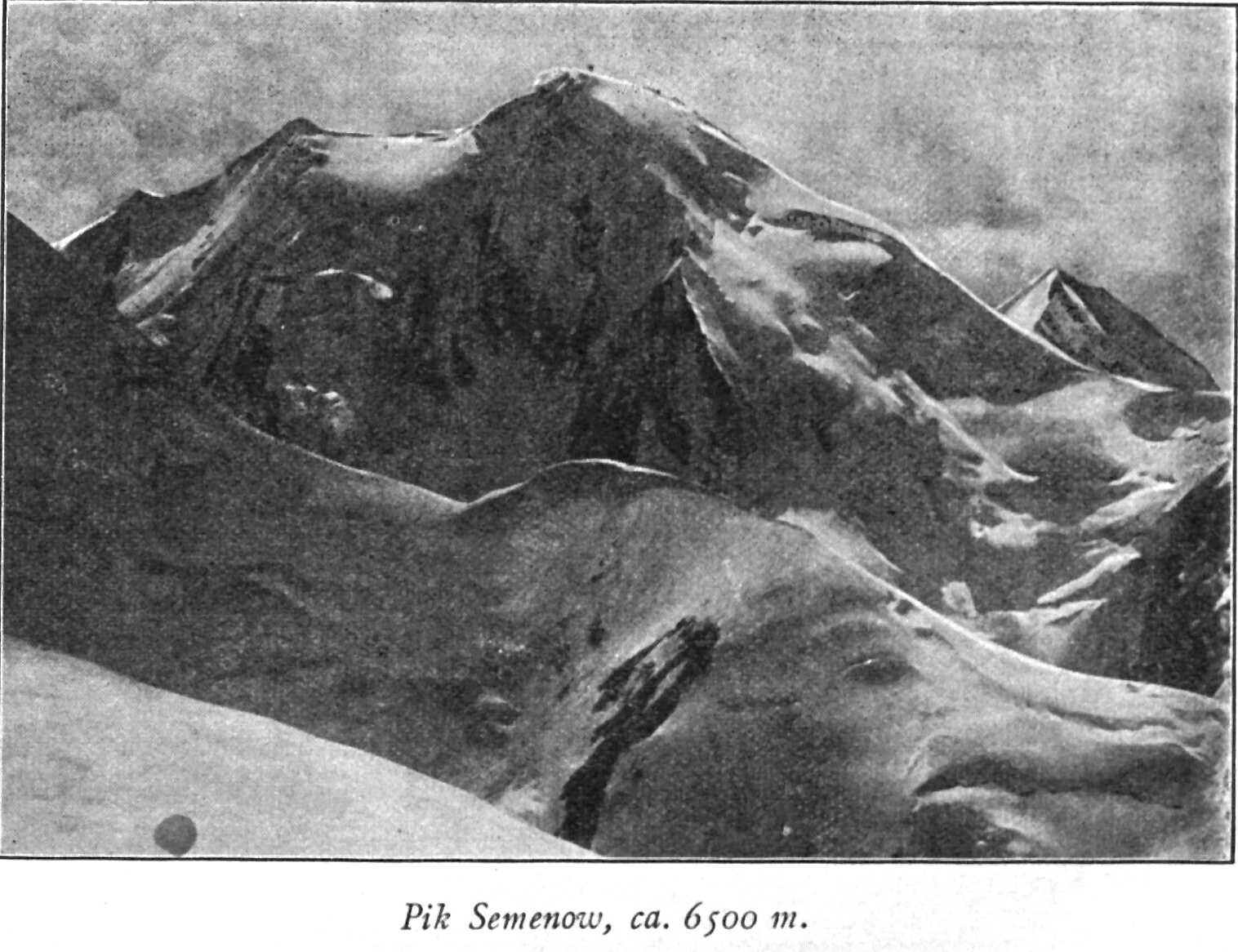
- Taken by German geographer Gottfried Merzbacher in 1902/3

Highest point
- Elevation: 5,816 m (19,081 ft)
- Prominence: 802 m (2,631 ft)
- Coordinates: 42°16′34″N 80°7′5″E

Geography
- Location within Kyrgyzstan Location within Kazakhstan
- Location: Issyk-Kul Region, Kyrgyzstan; Almaty Region, Kazakhstan
- Parent range: Saryjaz Range, Tian Shan

Semyonov Peak (Russian: Пик Семёнова, romanized: Pik Semyonova, Kyrgyz: Семёнов чокусу, romanized: Semyonov chokusu) is a 5,816-metre-high (19,081 ft) mountain in the Tian Shan on the border between Kyrgyzstan and Kazakhstan.

Semyonov Peak is one of the highest peaks of the Saryjaz Range. To its northwest lies the Semyonov Glacier. It lies 8.64 km northwest of Khan Tengri (6995 m) on the opposite side of the Northern Engilchek Glacier. The peak is named after the Russian geographer Pyotr Semyonov-Tyan-Shansky.
