= Mykan =

- Location within Kyrgyzstan
- Coordinates: 42°55′48″N 74°39′0″E
- Country: Kyrgyzstan
- Region: Chüy Region
- District: Alamüdün District
- Elevation: 669 m (2,195 ft)

Population (2021)
  - Total: 1,335

Mykan is a village in the Chüy Region of Kyrgyzstan. Its population was 1,335 in 2021.
