= Onbir-Jylga =

Onbir-Jylga Онбир-Жылга
- Location within Kyrgyzstan
- Coordinates: 42°41′40″N 75°25′20″E
- Country: Kyrgyzstan
- Region: Chüy Region
- District: Chüy District
- Elevation: 1,429 m (4,688 ft)

Population (2021)
  - Total: 1,609

Onbir-Jylga is a village in the Chüy District of Chüy Region of Kyrgyzstan. Its population was 1,609 in 2021.
