= Grigor'yevka =

Grigor'yevka Григорьевка
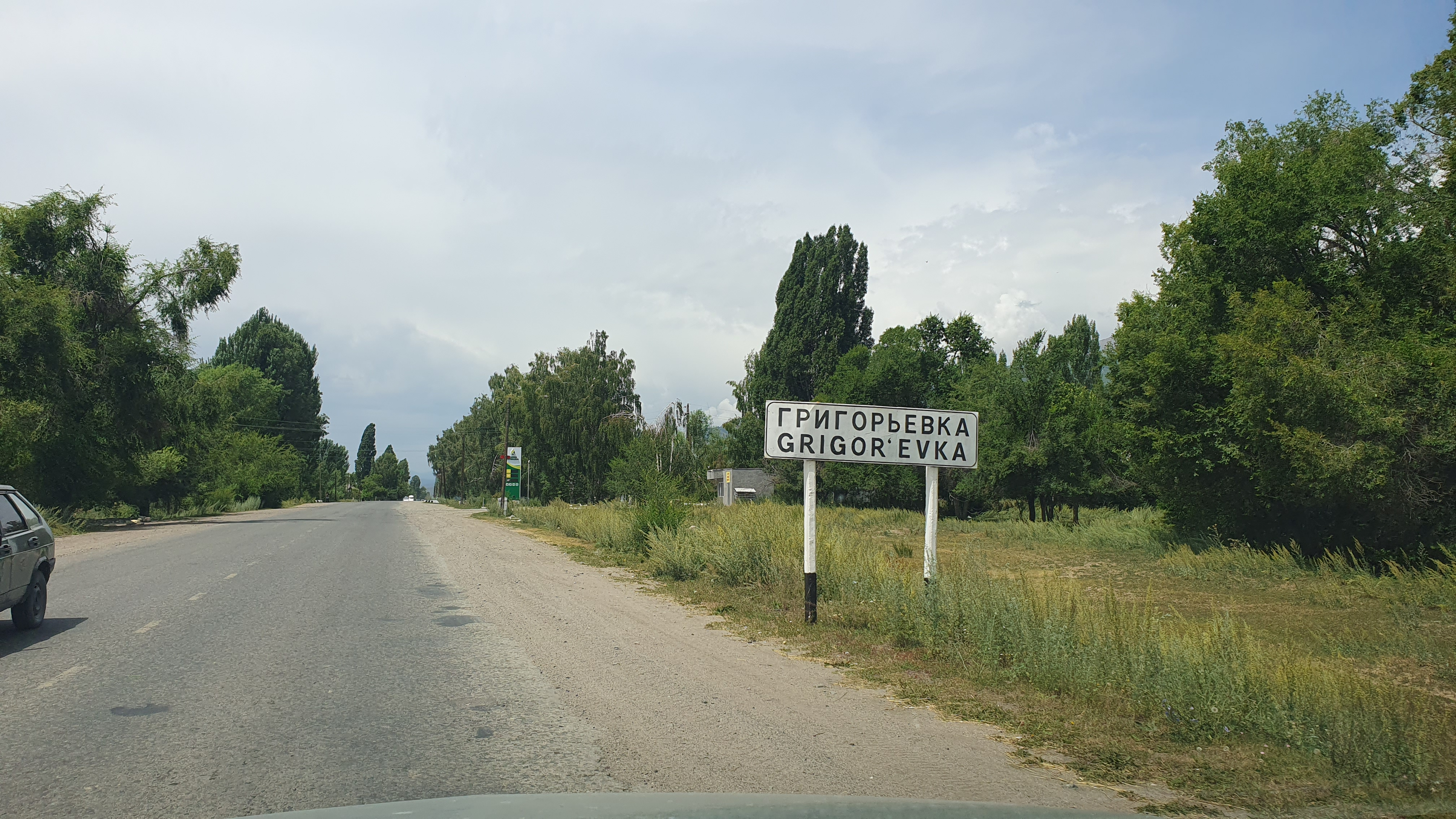

- Location within Kyrgyzstan
- Coordinates: 42°43′12″N 77°28′12″E
- Country: Kyrgyzstan
- Region: Issyk-Kul Region
- District: Issyk-Kul District
- Elevation: 1,780 m (5,840 ft)

Population (2023)
  - Total: 6,014
- Time zone: UTC+6

Grigor'yevka (Kyrgyz: Григорьевка) is a village in the Issyk-Kul Region of Kyrgyzstan. It is part of the Issyk-Kul District. Its population was 5,891 in 2021. Described as a 'pretty village', it is the start to treks up the 32km Chon Ak-Suu canyon. To the west on highway A363 is Bosteri, and to the east, Semyonovka.

== Population ==
Historical population
Year	Pop.	±% p.a.
2009	5,133	—
2021	5,891	+1.15%
Note: resident population; Sources:
