= Manap =

Kyrgyz tribal chieftain and member of the noble classes prior to 1917

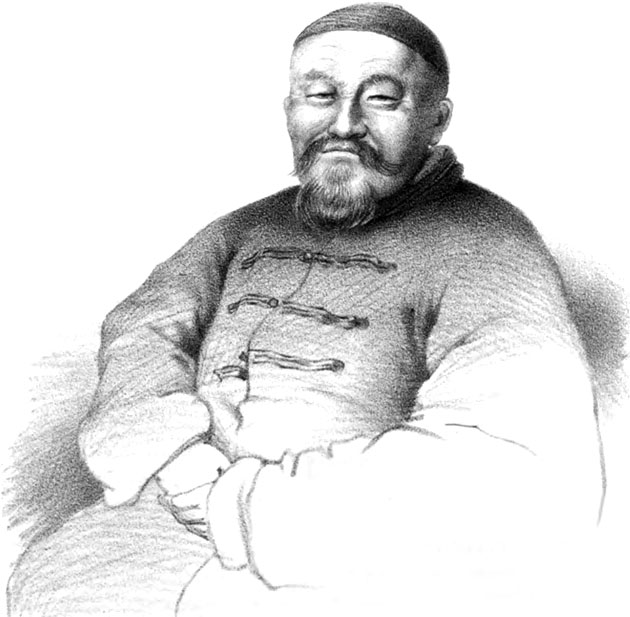
Borombay, a manap and bey

A manap (Kyrgyz: манап; Arabic script: ماناپ) was a tribal chieftain and a member of the noble class of Kyrgyz society prior to the 1917 Russian Revolution and the establishment of the Soviet Union. Manaps played an integral role in the initial conquest of Central Asia by the Russian Empire and Russia's colonial administration in present-day Kyrgyzstan. From 1880, manaps were the subject of increased public discontent over their frequent offloading of debts onto commoners. After the Russian Revolution, they were targeted by the Soviet government as a reactionary ruling class. In the present day, manaps are typically regarded as heroes in Kyrgyzstan, particularly for their role in fighting Russia during the Central Asian revolt of 1916.

Manaps are believed to have first appeared during the 17th century. The first manaps were elected, though the position later became hereditary according to scholar Tjaart W. Schillhorn van Veen. Manaps were originally no more than chieftains of small tribes, comprising 2–8 families who were typically connected by the patrilineal line.

With the 1822 Edict of Siberian Kirghiz, the Russian Empire abolished the autonomy of the Kazakh Khanate. The Edict of Siberian Kirghiz led to a wide-reaching uprising led by Kazakhs, which eventually began to penetrate Kyrgyz territories. In response, Russia began forging alliances with Kyrgyz manaps from 1846. Notably, Ormon, Borombay and Jantay were among Russia's first manap allies, and assisted in putting down the Kazakh uprising.

By the mid-19th century, manaps had become the primary political leaders of the Kyrgyz. As Russia increasingly attempted to secure its control over the Kyrgyz, they began to appoint colonial administrators who appointed manaps. Following the establishment of Russian Turkestan they fell out of favour with the Russians, who increasingly used direct rule, though they remained close. A group of manaps was chosen to represent Tokmak at the coronation of Emperor Alexander III in 1883, and from the 1870s propaganda described them as descendants of the legendary figure Tagay-biy, in contrast to the Chinggisid sultans of Central Asia. From the 1880s, they were increasingly distrusted by Kyrgyz commoners as they began to offload their debts onto the peasantry, such as by requisitioning camels or collecting taxes for themselves. The Russian government unsuccessfully attempted to charge manaps with corruption, though their efforts failed on the basis of the Kyrgyz commoners' suspicion of Russians.

Manaps were among the leaders of the Central Asian revolt of 1916, though Kyrgyz history writer Talant Jumabayev has said that little is known of their role in the conflict save for their constant infighting, and there is a possibility that some among them collaborated with the Russians or accelerated the revolt's defeat. Mokush Shabdan uulu, the son of popular manap Shabdan Jantay uulu, was appointed as khan of the revolt and several other local manaps declared themselves khans of their respective districts. Historian Kushbek Üsönbaev more critically assessed the manaps as exploiting the revolt, which he describes as primarily based around the lower classes, for their own political gain.

Following the 1917 Russian Revolution, the Soviet Union was established in place of the Russian Empire. Soviet officials in urban Turkestan viewed rural regions as lawless, corrupt and violent, and believed that it was necessary to control the countryside in order to spread social reforms. The Soviets initially struggled to determine whether manaps and other Central Asian classes were comparable to their conceptions of bourgeois classes, which had a basis in European (particularly Russian) society. By 1926 it had been determined that the manaps needed to be destroyed, and a process of seizing their properties and sending them into internal exile began.

While it was largely accepted in northern Kyrgyzstan (though protests against their deposition were frequent), the Soviet crackdown on manaps in southern Kyrgyzstan led to a revival of the Basmachi movement in early 1929. They were often depicted in Soviet historiography as feudal chieftains, though modern Kyrgyz historiography has lauded them as heroes for their role in the 1916 revolt.
