= List of wars involving the Kazakhs =

The Kazakhs, as part of the Kazakh Khanate, the Qing dynasty, the Russian Empire, the Alash Autonomy, the Kazakh Soviet Socialist Republic, the East Turkestan Republics, Mongolia, and the present day state of Kazakhstan, have fought many wars, both inside and outside their borders.

== Kazakh Khanate ==
Kazakh Khanate was established by Janibek Khan and Kerei Khan in 1465. Both khans came from Turco-Mongol clan of Tore which traces its lineage to Genghis Khan through dynasty of Jochids. The Tore clan continued to rule the khanate until its fall to the Russian Empire.

From 16th to 17th century, the Kazakh Khanate ruled and expanded its territories to eastern Cumania (modern-day West Kazakhstan), to most of Uzbekistan, Karakalpakstan and the Syr Darya river with military confrontation as far as Astrakhan and Khorasan Province, which are now in Russia and Iran, respectively. The Khanate was later weakened by a series of Oirat, Dzungar and, especially, the Chinese (Manchu) invasions. These resulted in a decline and further disintegration into three Jüzes, which gradually lost their sovereignty and were incorporated to the expanding Russian Empire in the 19th century.

Legends of results: Victory Defeat Stalemate Internal civil war Ongoing war

Date	Conflict	Combatant I	Combatant II	Result for Kazakhstan
1468–1500	The struggle in Eastern Desht-i-Kipchak	Kazakh Khanate; Great Horde; Khanate of Sibir; Timurid Empire	Uzbek Khanate; Nogai Horde; (Chagatai Khanate) Western Moghulistan; Timurid Empire	Victory: Kazakhs declare independence from the Uzbek Khanate
1502–1504	Struggle against Nogai Horde	Kazakh Khanate	Nogai Horde	Victory
1508	Kazakh–Nogai War (1508)	Kazakh Khanate	Nogai Horde	Victory
1503–1513	Kazakh–Uzbek Wars (1503–1513)	Kazakh Khanate	Khanate of Bukhara	Victory
1509–1510	Kazakh–Uzbek War (1509–1510)	Kazakh Khanate	Khanate of Bukhara	Victory
1515–1521	Kazakh–Nogai War (1515–1521)	Kazakh Khanate	Nogai Horde	Victory
1522–1538	First Kazakh Civil War	Kazakhs	Kazakhs	Victory for Haqnazar Khan
1522	Keldi-Muhammad's campaign against the Kazakhs	Kazakh Khanate	Khanate of Bukhara	Defeat
1522–1523	Nogai Reconquista	Kazakh Khanate	Nogai Horde	Defeat
1534	Kazakh–Uzbek War (1534)	Kazakh Khanate	Khanate of Bukhara; Nogai Horde	Victory
1535	Kazakh–Nogai War (1535)	Kazakh Khanate	Nogai Horde	Victory: Nogais are driven back across the Emba River
1560's	Kazakh–Moghul War	Kazakh Khanate	(Chagatai Khanate) Moghulistan; Oirat Confederation	Defeat
1568–1570	Russo-Turkish War (1568–1570)	Kazakh Khanate; Ottoman Empire; Crimean Khanate; Lesser Nogai Horde; Shamkhalate of Tarki	Tsardom of Russia; Don Cossacks; Zaporozhian Cossacks; Nogai Horde; Kabardia (East Circassia)	Defeat
1568–1569	Kazakh–Nogai War (1568–1569)	Kazakh Khanate	Nogai Horde	Victory
1572	Battle of Sarysu	Kazakh Khanate	(Yuan dynasty) Ordos Mongols	Victory
1577	Kazakh–Nogai War (1577)	Kazakh Khanate	Nogai Horde	Victory
1598	Kazakh invasion of Northern Bukhara	Kazakh Khanate	Khanate of Bukhara	Victory
1603–1605	Karakalpak rebellion	Kazakh Khanate	Karakalpaks	Victory
1613–1624, 1626–1627	Esim-Tursun conflict	Kazakhs	Kazakhs	Victory for Esim Khan
1635–1741	Kazakh–Dzungar Wars	Kazakh Khanate	Dzungar Khanate; Kalmyk Khanate	Inconclusive
1645–1647	Mughal Central Asia campaign	Kazakh Khanate; Khanate of Bukhara	Mughal Empire; Kingdom of Amber; Nurpur kingdom	Victory
1723–1726	Kazakh–Kalmyk War (1723–1726)	Kazakh Khanate	Kalmyk Khanate; Russian Empire	Peaceful Agreement
1743–1744, 1746–1747	Abul Khair–Neplyuyev conflict	Kazakh Khanate	Russian Empire; Kalmyk Khanate	Victory
1756–1757	First Sino–Kazakh War	Kazakh Khanate; Dzungar Khanate	Qing dynasty	Inconclusive
1765–1767	Second Sino–Kazakh War	Kazakh Khanate	Qing dynasty	Inconclusive
1771	1771 Torghut migration	Kazakh Khanate; Russian Empire	Kalmyk Khanate	Inconclusive

== Russian conquest of Central Asia ==
Date	Conflict	Combatant I	Combatant II	Result for Kazakhstan	Khan/Leader
1825—1836	Sarzhan's rebellion	Kazakh rebels Khanate of Kokand(1834-1835)	Russian Empire; Khanate of Kokand(1832, 1836)	Defeat	Sarzhan Qasymov; Yesengeldy Qasymov; Kasym Sultan; Kenesary Qasymuly; Ağatai Qasymov; Bopai Qasymova
1836—1838	Bukey Horde uprising	Kazakh rebels	Russian Empire; Bukey Horde	Defeat	Isatay Taymanuly; Makhambet Otemisuly
1837—1847	Kenesary's Rebellion: Battle of Aktau; Siege of Akmolinsk; Aktau raid; Siege of Sozak; Kamal Blockade	Kazakh Khanate; Supported by:: Khanate of Khiva; Emirate of Bukhara	Russian Empire supported by: Khanate of Kokand Kara-Kyrgyz Khanate	Defeat	Kenesary Qasymov
1820s-1851	Zhankozha Nurmukhamedov's struggle against Khiva and Kokand	Russian Empire; Kazakh Khanate (until 1847)	Khanate of Khiva; Khanate of Kokand	Victory	Zhankozha Nurmuhamedov

== Kazakhstan under Russian occupation ==
Date	Conflict	Combatant I	Combatant II	Result for Kazakhstan	Khan/Leader
1856-1860	Zhankozha Nurmukhamedov's Uprising	Kazakh rebels	Russian Empire	Defeat: Uprising suppressed	Zhankozha Nurmuhamedov
1850-1868	Russo–Kokand War	Russian Empire: Pro-russian Kazakhs; Pro-russian Kyrgyz people	Khanate of Kokand; Kyrgyz Khanate	Victory	Suranshy Batyr; Tezek Nuralin
1868-1869	Uprising in Ural and Turgay Oblast	Kazakh rebels	Russian Empire	Defeat: Uprising suppressed	Bergen Kospanov; Seil Turkebaev; Kuspai Aibasov; Mambetali; Kanaly Aryslanuly
1870	Adai rebellion: Expedition of Rukin; Siege of Alexandrovsky fort; Battle of the Cape Chagrai	Aday rebels supported by: Khanate of Khiva	Russian Empire	Defeat	Dosan Tazhiev; Isa Tlenbaev; Erzhan Kulov; Ermembet Kulov; Kutzhan Orakov
1916-1917	Central Asian revolt of 1916	Turkic tribes: Kazakh tribes, including Turgay Rebels; Kyrgyz rebels; supported by: (German Empire) Small number of escaped POWs, Central Powers intelligence; Chinese volunteers	Russian Empire supported by: Emirate of Bukhara	Defeat: Uprising suppressed	Amankeldı İmanov; Äbdiğapar Janbosynūly; Älıbi Jangeldin; Keiki-batyr

== Alash–Orda (1917–1920) ==
Kazakhs, tired of almost a century of Russian colonization, started to rise up. In the 1870s–80s, schools in Kazakhstan massively started to open, which developed elite, future Kazakh members of the Alash party. In 1916, after conscription of Muslims into the military for service in the Eastern Front during World War I, Kazakhs and Kyrgyzs rose up against the Russian government, with uprisings until February 1917.

The state was proclaimed during the Second All-Kazakh Congress held at Orenburg from 5–13 December 1917 OS (18–26 NS), with a provisional government being established under the oversight of Alikhan Bukeikhanov. However, the nation's purported territory was still under the de facto control of the region's Russian-appointed governor, Vassily Balabanov, until 1919. In 1920, he fled the Russian Red Army for self-imposed exile in China, where he was recognised by the Chinese as Kazakhstan's legitimate ruler.

Following its proclamation in December 1917, Alash leaders established the Alash Orda, a Kazakh government which was aligned with the White Army and fought against the Bolsheviks in the Russian Civil War. In 1919, when the White forces were losing, the Alash Autonomous government began negotiations with the Bolsheviks. By 1920, the Bolsheviks had defeated the White Russian forces in the region and occupied Kazakhstan. On 17 August 1920, the Soviet government established the Kirghiz Autonomous Socialist Soviet Republic, which in 1925 changed its name to Kazakh Autonomous Socialist Soviet Republic, and finally to Kazakh Soviet Socialist Republic in 1936.

Date	Battle	Combatant I	Combatant II	Result for Kazakhstan	Leader
1918-1922	Russian Civil War in Central Asia: Semirechye Front; Defence of Uralsk; Uralsk-Guryev operation	Alash-Orda: Alash Militia; White Army (until 1919); RSFSR (from 1919)	RSFSR (until 1919); White Army (from 1919)	Inconclusive: Kazakhstan becomes a Kazakh Autonomous Socialist Soviet Republic; Alash-Orda ceases to exist	Keiki-batyr; Alikhan Bukeikhanov; Zhakhansha Dosmukhamedov

== Soviet Union ==
During most of the 20th century Kazakhstan was a Soviet Republic within USSR, participating in the wars USSR took a part in.

Despite the peaceful integration of Alash-Orda into the USSR, Kazakh people also participated in series of revolts against Soviet rule, the main wave of uprising had been caused by collectivisation and Asharshylyk:

Date	Conflict	Combatant I	Combatant II	Result for Kazakhstan	Leader(s)/Khan(s)
1921	Anti-bolshevik revolt in Northern Kazakhstan	Green Rebels: Peasants; Cossacks; Kazakhs	USSR: Kazak ASSR	Defeat: Uprising suppressed	Vladimir Rodin; Maslov; Khorev; Karesevich
1928-1930	Sarysu-sozak uprising	Kazakh rebels: Sarysu District rebels; Sozak District rebels; Tama tribe Defected communists - members of Komsomol	USSR: Kazak ASSR	Defeat: Uprising suppressed	Sultanbek Shulakuly; Ali Asadulla; Mirza-Akhmet Baskiyev
1929	Bostandyk uprising	Kazakh rebels: Boʻstonliq District rebels; Basmachi	USSR: Kazak ASSR	Defeat: Uprising suppressed	T. Musabayev; U. Maylybayed; I. Chanybekova
1929	Batpakkarin uprising	Kazakh rebels: Batpakkarin District rebels; Zhangeldi District rebels; Nauyrzym District rebels	USSR: Kazak ASSR	Defeat: Uprising suppressed	Omar Barmakov; Abaydilda Bekzhanov; Seytbek Kaliyev; Akhmediya Smagulov
1929-1932	Aday uprising of 1929	Aday tribe members	USSR: Kazak ASSR	Defeat: Uprising suppressed	Bokymash Sholanuly; Rakhmet Aminuly; Myrzaly Tynynmbayev; Yergali Kuttengenov; Mamay Salpykuly; Zhumabay Usenuly; Kangabay; Dosan Shopanuly; Zharmangabet Kobayuly; Dauylbay Bimaganbetuly
1930	Sarbaz rebellion	Kazakh rebels: Sarbazy; Russian White movement supporters Altai rebels Buryat rebels	USSR: Kazak ASSR	Defeat: Uprising suppressed	
1930	Balkash-Shokpar uprising	Kazakh rebels: Balkhash District rebels; Chokpar District rebels	USSR: Kazak ASSR	Defeat: Uprising suppressed	Abdibek Nurabayev; Kosherbay Kuramysov
1930	Baribay uprising	Kazakh rebels: Sharua	USSR: Kazak ASSR	Defeat: Uprising suppressed	K. Akhmetzhanov; K. Ibragimov; Zh.Saukymbayev
1930	Asan uprising	Kazakh rebels: Kazaly District rebels; Alshyn tribe members	USSR: Kazak ASSR	Defeat: Uprising suppressed	Maksym Orumbetov
1931	Abralin uprising	Kazakh rebels: Abralin District rebels	USSR: Kazak ASSR	Defeat: Uprising suppressed	Esimbek Musabekuly; Y. Kempirbayev
1931	Korday uprising	Kazakh rebels: Korday District rebels	USSR: Kazak ASSR	Defeat: Uprising suppressed	
1931	Alak uprising	Kazakh rebels: Kyzyltasy District rebels	USSR: Kazak ASSR	Defeat: Uprising suppressed; Survivors fled to China	

== Republic of China ==
Following the fall of the Qing dynasty in 1912, the Republic of China was proclaimed. Initially, the Chinese state attempted to provide a peaceful management, but repressive policies, the warlord chaos, Soviet intervention, and the increasing number of Han and Hui migration pushed Kazakhs to war against the Chinese state, aligning their goal with the Kyrgyz and the larger Uyghurs and Uzbeks for an independent East Turkestan:

Date	Conflict	Combatant I	Combatant II	Result for Kazakhstan	Leader(s)/Khan(s)
1931–1949	Xinjiang Wars	East Turkestan Soviet Union; Russian White movement supporters Mongolian People's Republic	Republic of China People's Republic of China; Soviet Union; Russian White movement supporters Mongolian People's Republic	Defeat: Uprising suppressed; Survivors fled south to India	Osman Batur
1931–1934	Kumul Rebellion	Turkic Islamic Republic of East Turkestan: Kazakhs; Kyrgyz; Uyghurs; Soviet Union; Russian White movement supporters	Republic of China: Ma clique; Xinjiang clique; Soviet Union; Russian White movement supporters	Defeat: Uprising suppressed	Osman Batur
1935	Charkhlik revolt	Uyghur and Kazakh rebels	Republic of China: Ma clique	Defeat: Uprising suppressed	
1937	Islamic rebellion in Xinjiang	Republic of China: Ma clique; Turkic Muslim rebels: Kazakhs; Kyrgyz; Uyghurs; Uzbeks	Xinjiang clique Soviet Union	Defeat: Uprising suppressed	
1944–1946	Ili Rebellion	Second East Turkestan Republic Soviet Union; Mongolian People's Republic	Republic of China	Victory: Short-lived independence	Osman Batur; Dalelkhan Sugirbayev
1949	PRC's conquest of Xinjiang	Second East Turkestan Republic Republic of China	People's Republic of China Soviet Union; Mongolian People's Republic	Defeat: Fall of the East Turkestan Republic	Osman Batur; Dalelkhan Sugirbayev

== Republic of Kazakhstan (1991–present) ==
Kazakhstan was the last of the Soviet republics to declare independence during the dissolution of the Soviet Union from 1988 to 1991.

Date	Conflict	Combatant I	Combatant II	Result for Kazakhstan	President of Kazakhstan
1992–1997	Tajikistani Civil War	CSTO: Kazakhstan	United Tajik Opposition; Jamiat-e Islami (until 1996); Afghanistan (until 1996); Hezb-e Islami Gulbuddin (until 1996); Taliban factions	Military stalemale: United Nations-sponsored armistice; Comprehensive Peace Agreement signed; Rahmon wins the 1999 Tajik presidential election; The United Tajik Opposition is promised 30 percent of the ministerial positions	Nursultan Nazarbayev
1996–2001	Afghan Civil War	Kazakhstan; Uzbekistan; Tajikistan; Kyrgyzstan; Iran; India; Russia; Islamic State of Afghanistan	Islamic Emirate of Afghanistan al-Qaeda; Islamic Movement of Uzbekistan; East Turkistan Islamic Party; Tanzeem-e-Nifaz-e-Shariat-e-Mohammadi; Pakistan	Military stalemale: Continued clashes until the US-led invasion of Afghanistan; Taliban control up to 85% of Afghanistan including the capital Kabul; Civil war continues	Nursultan Nazarbayev
2002–2014	Operation Enduring Freedom - Horn of Africa	Kazakhstan; NATO	Insurgents: Islamic State of Iraq and the Levant (from 2015); al-Qaeda (from 2002); Al-Shabaab (from 2006); al-Itihaad al-Islamiya (2002–06); Hizbul Islam (2009–14); Ras Kamboni Brigades (2007–10); Jabhatul Islamiya (2007–09); Mu'askar Anole (2007–09)	Ongoing: 21 high level Al-Shabaab leaders killed	Nursultan Nazarbayev; Kassym-Jomart Tokayev
2003–2011	Iraq War	Kazakhstan; United States; MNF–I; United Kingdom; New Iraqi government Iraqi Kurdistan	Iraq (2003)	Victory: Overthrow of Saddam Hussein	Nursultan Nazarbayev
2022	Bloody January: CSTO operation in Kazakhstan	Kazakhstan; Russia; Belarus; Tajikistan; Kyrgyzstan; Armenia	Protesters	Internal unrest: Protests suppressed; Nursultan Nazarbayev removed from the Security Council of Kazakhstan and from being a chairman of the Nur Otan party; Restoration of vehicle fuel price caps of 50 tenge per litre for six months; Nationwide state of emergency declared from 5 January to 20 January	Kassym-Jomart Tokayev

== See also ==
- Outline of Kazak military history
- List of massacres in Kazakhstan
- Kazakh–Russian ethnic conflicts
