= Kazakh–Nogai War =

Kazakh–Nogai War may refer to:

- Kazakh–Nogai War (1508)
- Kazakh–Nogai War (1515–1521)
- Kazakh–Nogai War (1568–1569)
- Kazakh–Nogai War (1577)
