= List of military conflicts involving Nogai Horde =

List of wars, campaigns and battles of the Nogai Horde from 1391 to 1644.

== Table ==
Legends of results:

Victory
Defeat
Stalemate
Internal civil war

Date	Conflict	Combatant 1	Combatant 2	Result
1399	Battle of the Vorskla River	Golden Horde Mangytsky Ulus	Grand Duchy of Lithuania	Victory
1465–1500	Kazakh War of Independence	Uzbek Khanate; Nogai Horde (Chagatai Khanate) Western Moghulistan	Kazakh Khanate; Timurid Empire; Khanate of Sibir	Stalemate
1490–x	Siege of Sygnak	Kazakh Khanate; Nogai Horde	Bukhara Khanate	Victory
1508	Kazakh-Nogai War (1508)	Nogai Horde	Kazakh Khanate	Defeat
1509	Nogai-Crimean War (1509)	Nogai Horde	Crimean Khanate	Defeat
1515–1521	Kazakh-Nogai War (1515-1521)	Nogai Horde	Kazakh Khanate	Defeat
1521	Crimean Campaign against Russia	Crimean Khanate; Nogai Horde; Kazan Khanate; Grand Duchy of Lithuania	Tsardom of Russia	Victory
1537	Battle of San-Tash	Nogai Horde; Bukhara Khanate; Moghulistan	Kazakh Khanate	Victory
1568	Kazakh-Nogai War (1568)	Nogai Horde	Kazakh Khanate	Stalemate
1568–1570	Russo-Turkish War (1568–1570)	Ottoman Empire; Crimean Khanate; Nogai Horde; Shamkhalate of Tarki	Tsardom of Russia; Don Cossacks; Zaporozhian Cossacks	Defeat
1571	Crimean Campaign against Russia	Crimean Khanate; Nogai Horde; Ottoman Empire	Tsardom of Russia	Victory
1572	Battle of Molodi	Crimean Khanate; Nogai Horde; Ottoman Empire	Tsardom of Russia	Defeat
1577	Kazakh-Nogai War (1577)	Nogai Horde	Kazakh Khanate	Defeat
1628–1634	Nogai-Kalmyk War	Nogai Horde	Kalmyk Khanate	Defeat
1644	Kalmyk Invasion of Kabardia (1644)	Kabardia; Nogai Horde	Kalmyk Khanate	Victory

== Sources ==
- В. В. Трепавлов. История Ногайской Орды. Москва. Издательская фирма «Восточная литература», РАН
- Атыгаев. Н. Б. Казахское ханство: очерки внешнеполитической истории XV—XVII веков.. — Алматы: Евразийский научно-исследовательский институт МКТУ им. Х.А. Ясави, 2023. — 225 с. — ISBN 978-601-7805-24-1.
