= Siege of Sighnaq =

Part of the Kazakh War of Independence in the 1480s

- Part of the Kazakh War of Independence of Kazakh–Uzbek Wars
Date	c. 1480s
Location	Sighnaq, Kazakhstan
Result	Kazakh victory

Belligerents
Kazakh Khanate	Khanate of Bukhara

Commanders and leaders
Burunduk Khan; Hamza-bek	Muhammad Shaybani

The Siege of Sighnaq was a siege of city of Sighnaq by the Kazakh Khanate and the mercenaries from the Nogai Horde, led by Burunduk Khan against the Khanate of Bukhara, led by Muhammed Shaybani

== Background ==
In the 1470s, the Kazakh khans Zhanibek and Kerey, and later Burunduk, actively sought to subjugate the Eastern Desht-i-Kipchak. They concentrated their efforts on strengthening their influence, particularly in the southern regions of Kazakhstan. Using their domains in Western Zhetysu as a base, they emerged as a significant political force in the steppes of Central Kazakhstan. Despite a powerful alliance of opponents, which included the Shaybanids and Manghit leaders, they succeeded in consolidating their positions.

== Cause ==
In the 1480s, the influence of the Kazakh rulers expanded across both the steppe regions and the oases of southern Kazakhstan. During this period and into the early 1490s, the military actions between Muhammad Shaybani and the Kazakhs were characterized by tenacity and uncompromising resolve, with both the Timurids and Moghul khans intervening in their conflicts. After appearing in the Turkestan Vilayet, Muhammad Shaybani once again captured the fortress of Arkuk. The cities of Sozak and Sygnak were under Kazakh control, however, when the khans or sultans withdrew their troops from these cities into the steppe, the settlements were left virtually defenseless and easily became targets for other claimants.

== Siege ==
Muhammad Sheibani managed to seize the city of Sygnak when Burunduk Khan arrived from the steppe with an army supported by allied Manghits. Subsequently, the Kazakh forces began a siege of Sygnak, which lasted for three months. However, Muhammad Sheibani organized the defense, and according to the sources, the siege ended in failure for the Kazakhs. Despite his success in defending the city, Shaybani was unable to advance further into the steppe. He left a garrison in Sygnak and headed to Otrar.

The combined forces of Burunduk Khan, the sons of Janibek - Kasym Sultan and Adik Sultan and the Manghit Hamza-bek besieged Sygnak for three months. Battles took place twice daily, but having suffered significant losses and achieved no success, they were forced to retreat. In the spring of the following year, Burunduk Khan, all the sons of Janibek, and the Manghits reunited and began active military operations. After Shayban's departure, Burunduk Khan returned and besieged Sygnak once again. The city's inhabitants, remembering that it had formerly belonged to Burunduk Khan, decided to surrender it without further resistance. It is likely that the urban elites supported the descendants of the former rulers of Sygnak and other cities of the Syr Darya region associated with the White Horde, specifically, Sadr al-Islam Qazi, Chikmak-yuzbegi, and Siddiq-sheikh surrendered the city to the Kazakhs.

Meanwhile, Muhammad Sheibani, striving to establish his authority in the Dasht-i Qipchaq, undertook a new campaign toward Sygnak after the siege of Yassy, where his brother Sultan-Mahmud was located. The Kazakhs, continuing their offensive actions, besieged Arkuk after crossing the Syr Darya. In response, Sheibani hastened back to protect the fortress but suffered a defeat, losing control over this strategically important point.

== Consequences ==
The Shaybanids managed to maintain their defense of Arkuk for 40 days against the combined forces of the Kazakhs and the Timurid governor. The unexpected alliance of Muhammad Mazid Tarkhan with the Kazakhs was likely driven by the desire of Sultan Ahmad Mirza of Samarkand to prevent the Uzbeks under Muhammad Shaybani from seizing Timurid territories in Turkestan. Previously, the Timurid governor in Turkestan had supported Muhammad Shaybani, believing that his goal was merely to seize power in the steppe regions of the former state of Abu'l-Khayr Khan, and that the conflict with the Kazakhs in the Eastern Desht-i-Kipchak would distract all parties from the cities of Turkestan.

== Meaning ==
Muhammad Shaybani's defeats during a nearly continuous three-year struggle against the Kazakhs and their allies forced him to abandon Turkestan around 1486 and depart to seek military fortune in Khwarazm.

== Bibliography ==
- Pishchulina, K. A. (2016). Uskenbay, K. Z.; Dzhandosova, Z. A. (eds.). Очерки истории казахского ханства [Essays on history of Kazakh Khanate] (in Russian). Almaty: Институт истории и этиологии им Ч. Ч. Валиханова. ISBN 978-601-7342-14-2.
- Klyashtorny, S. G.; Sultanov, T. I. (1992). Казахстан. Летопись: трех тысячелетий [Kazakhstan. Chronicle: three millennia] (in Russian). Almaty: Рауан. p. 294.
