= Kenesary Khan Monument in Astana =

Statue in Astana

Kenesary Khan Monument
- Кенесары хан ескерткіші
- Location: Astana
- Designer: Shot-Aman Valikhanov
- Completion date: 2001
- Opening date: 2001

The Kenesary Khan Monument (Kazakh: Кенесары хан ескерткіші) was established in 2001 in Astana, Kazakhstan. It is recognized as a monument of history and architecture of Astana.

== History ==
The monument was installed in 2001 in the capital of Kazakhstan, the city of Astana, on the bank of the Ishim River. The sculptor was Nurlan Dalbay, and the architect was Shot-Aman Valikhanov. The project was approved by the First President of Kazakhstan, Nursultan Nazarbayev.

The monument has a total height of 11 metres, consisting of a 6-metre figure and a 5-metre pedestal. Its total weight exceeds 10 tonnes, including approximately 8 tonnes of bronze and a steel framework. The monument is situated on a high riverbank, from which Kenesary Khan appears to gaze over the city.

The official unveiling of the monument took place on 11 May 2001. The first flowers at the base of the monument were laid by President Nursultan Nazarbayev.
