= List of massacres in Kazakhstan =

This is a list of massacres in Kazakhstan.

Overviews of massacres in Kazakhstan
Name	Date	Location	Perpetrators	Deaths	Notes
Barefooted Flight	1723–1727	Territory of Three Jüzes	Dzungars	~125,000+ killed, wounded, captured and displaced (25,000+ kibitkas)	Mass extermination of the Kazakh people by the Dzungars
Karakalpak genocide	1741–1743	Junior Jüz	Kazakhs	~1,5 million Karakalpaks (300,000 kibitkas)	Extermination of the Karakalpaks in the Junior Jüz of the Kazakh Khanate during the reign of Abul Khair Khan
Dzungar genocide	1755–1758	Dzungar Khanate (modern-day Dzungaria, Western Mongolia, Kazakhstan, northern Kyrgyzstan, southern Siberia, Xinjiang)	Qing Eight Banners, Kazakhs, Khalkha Mongols, Uyghur and Hui rebels	420,000–480,000 (70%–80% of the Dzungar population, from both warfare and disease)	
Akmolinsk massacre	1838	Akmolinsk	Kazakh rebels	Hundreds of Russians	Attack on Akmolinsk, house burning, interception of squads
Incidents during the Adayev uprising: Rukin's incident; Nikolayev incident	1870	Mangyshlak Peninsula	Kazakh rebels	Dozens of Russians and Armenians	Attacks on Russian settlements
Turkestan massacre	1916	Turkestan, Kazakhstan	Kazakh rebels	7,000 Russians	Massacre of the Russians by Kazakh rebels
Central Asian revolt of 1916	1916–1917	Central Asia	Imperial Russian Army	100,000–300,000 Kazakhs and Kyrgyzs	Genocide of Central Asian peoples by the Russian Empire
Sergiopol massacre	1918	Ayagoz, Kazakhstan	Alash Militia	100 Red Army soldiers and Russian civilians	After the capture of Sergiopol, the troops of Alash staged cruel reprisals against the civilian population in it
Semirechye massacres	1920	Zhetysu, Kazakhstan	Alash Militia	3,800–25,000 Annenkovites and Red Army mens	The brutal reprisal of Ataman Annenkov over his former soldiers
Novouzenskaya massacre	17–28 June 1989	(Kazakh Soviet Socialist Republic) Zhanaozen, Kazakhstan	Kazakhs	~4—240 Caucasians and Russians	Interethnic clashes on June 17–28, 1989 in the city of Novy Uzen of the Kazakh SSR between groups of Kazakhs and people from the North Caucasus.
Zhanaozen massacre	16–17 December 2011	Mangystau Region, Kazakhstan	Government of Kazakhstan: Ministry of Internal Affairs; Police of Kazakhstan	14+ Oil workers	The most notorious mass oil strike of 2011 erupted into riots in the city of Zhanaozen on December 16, in which 15 people died, hundreds were injured and arrested.
Arkankergen massacre	28 May 2012	Arkankergen, Kazakhstan	Vladislav Chelakh	15 border guards	Mass murder in the Alakol region of Kazakhstan on the border with China, near the village of Usharal.
Ile-Alatau National Park massacre	13–14 August 2012	(Kazakhstan) Ile-Alatau National Park, Almaty Region	Religious extremists	13 men	Mass murder of 12 (13) people by religious extremists in Ili-Alatau National Park, Almaty region
Qandy Qantar massacre 2022	3–10 January 2022	Kazakhstan	Government of Kazakhstan: Ministry of Internal Affairs; Police of Kazakhstan	During the week-long violent unrest and crackdowns, 227 people were killed and over 9,900 were arrested, according to Kazakh officials.	On 7 January, President of Kazakhstan said in a statement that constitutional order had "largely been restored in all regions of the country. He also announced that he had ordered troops to use lethal force against protesters, authorizing instructions to "shoot to kill" without warning, calling the protesters "bandits and terrorists" and saying that the use of force would continue to "destroy the protests."

== See also ==
- List of wars involving Kazakhstan
- Kazakh famine of 1919–1922
- Kazakh famine of 1930–1933

== Sources ==
- Clarke, Michael Edmund (2004). In the Eye of Power: China and Xinjiang from the Qing Conquest to the 'New Great Game' for Central Asia, 1759–2004 (PDF) (PhD). Brisbane, Queensland: Dept. of International Business & Asian Studies, Griffith University. Archived from the original (PDF) on 10 April 2008.
- Perdue, Peter C. (2009). China Marches West: The Qing Conquest of Central Eurasia (reprint ed.). Harvard University Press. ISBN 978-0674042025.
