= Kazakh–Uzbek Wars =

Wars between the Khanate of Bukhara and the Kazakh Khanate

The Kazakh–Uzbek Wars were a series of military conflict in Central Asia waged between the Kazakh Khanate and the Khanate of Bukhara

- Kazakh–Uzbek Wars (1503–1513), Wars waged by the Muhammad Shaybani of the Khanate of Bukhara.
- Kazakh–Uzbek War (1509–1510), campaign by the Muhammad Shaybani against the Kazakh Khanate.
- Kazakh–Uzbek War (1534), war over the control of the city of Tashkent.
- Kazakh invasion of Transoxiana (1598), Kazakh invasion of modern-day Uzbekistan
- Ablai Khan's Tashkent–Khujand campaigns, Kazakh campaigns against Khanate of Kokand
