= Siege of Sozak =

Siege by the Kazakh Khanate against the Kokand Khanate

- Part of the Kenesary's Rebellion
Date	September, 1841
Location	Sozak, Kazakhstan
Result	Kazakh victory

Belligerents
- Kazakh Khanate • Syrdarya Kazakhs

Commanders and leaders
Kenesary Qasymuly; Zhankozha Nurmukhamedov	Rais

Strength
4,000	5,000

The Siege of Sozak was a siege the Kokand fortress by the combined forces of Kenesary and Zhankozhi in 1841.

== Background ==
In 1846, Zhankozha joined forces with Kenesary and started fighting against the Kokandians.

== History ==
In early September 1841, Kenesary set out on a campaign to Tashkent with a four-thousand-strong detachment composed of Kazakhs from the Chumekei, Tortkarin, and Tabyn clans. However, an outbreak of disease among his troops forced him to delay. Meanwhile, another part of his army laid siege to the fortresses of Suzak, Yani-Kurgan, Zhulek, and Ak-Mechet.

The battle for Suzak was particularly intense. Eyewitnesses reported that the siege lasted for 18 days, with Kenesary's forces using wooden ladders to scale the fortress walls. As a result, Kenesary managed to destroy Suzak's fortifications and those of other strongholds. He then incorporated local Kazakhs, who had been under Kokand rule, into his ranks and directed them toward Turgai.

These victories significantly strengthened Kenesary's authority among the Kazakh population. After suffering defeat, the Kokand khan offered him an alliance, but Kenesary refused, demanding the return of territories that historically belonged to the Kazakhs.

== Consequences ==
In 1846, Zhankozha joined forces with Kenesary to fight against the Kokand forces. Together, they captured Sozak, but disagreements soon arose between them, and the batyr chose to act independently. For Zhankozha, the primary enemy remained Khiva, while Kenesary was focused on seeking revenge against Kokand.

== Bibliography ==
- Bekmakhanov, E. (1992). Казахстан в 20-40 годы XIX века [Kazakhstan in the 20-40 years of the XIX century]. Казак Университет. pp. 254–255. ISBN 5-7090-0047-7.
- История Казахстана с древнейших времён до наших дней (очерк) [The history of Kazakhstan from ancient times to the present day (essay)]. Almaty: Дауир. 1993. p. 217. ISBN 5-86228-054-5.
- Aldazhumanov, K. S.; Asylbekov, M. X.; Kasymbaev, Zh. K.; Kozybaev, M. K. (2010). История Казахстана с древнейших времён до наших дней в пяти томах. Том 3 [The history of Kazakhstan from ancient times to the present day in five volumes. Volume 3]. Almaty: Атамура. p. 347. ISBN 978-601-282-025-6.
