= Siege of Alexandrovsky fort =

- Part of Adai rebellion
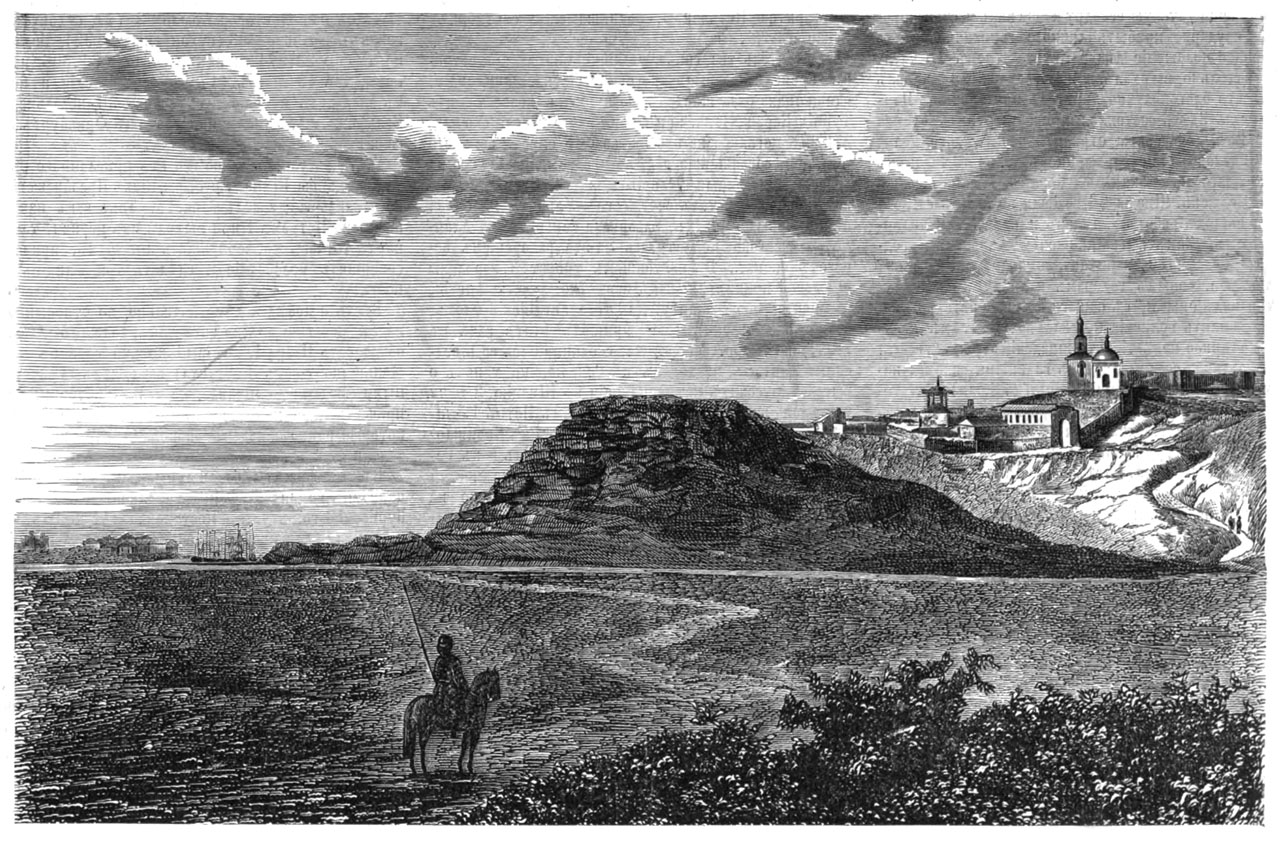
- View of the fort in 1870
Date	17–22 April [O.S. 5–10 April] 1870
Location	Alexandrovsky Fort, Russian Empire (Modern day Kazakhstan)
Result	Russian victory

Belligerents
Russia	Adai rebels

Commanders and leaders
Egor Zelenin	Isa Tlenbaev

Strength
150	10,000

Casualties and losses
Light	Heavy

The siege of Alexandrovsky fort (Russian: Осада Александровского форта) was an unsuccessful attempt by the Kazakh rebels to take the only fortified fort in the region, the expedition arrived in time and saved the garrison from death.

== Background ==
In the autumn of 1870, unrest began among local Kazakhs in Mangyshlak, a detachment of 40 Cossacks marched into the steppe, due to command errors and the large number of rebels, the detachment completely annihilated, and the rebels began to plunder the territory in the district, their main goal was Fort Alexandrovsky. The garrison of the fort consisted of 150 people, and the rebel forces reached 10,000.

== Siege ==
=== Conversation ===
Before the assault, the rebels planned to deceive the garrison, and claimed that they had the entire Rukin detachment in captivity and that they were ready to let the prisoners and the garrison go home if he surrendered, Zelenin already knew about the fate of his colleague and in order to offend biya, he sent a poor Kazakh on a half-dead horse to him in response, this was successful and Isa began to prepare for the assault. Before that, he said that the rebels rely on God, and the garrison on guns, and that all the inhabitants of the fort are waiting for death.

=== Further actions ===
On April 6, the general assault began, the garrison had a limited supply of ammunition, but the commandant of the fort ordered increased fire to inspire the rebels that the city had the strength to defend itself. This had its success, the assault was repulsed, but the rebels moved their attacks to the commanding heights near the fort, a sortie with cannon was sent there and the Russians won. Out of anger, the rebels began to rob the nearby Armenian quarter, the Russians specifically let them into the quarter and covered the area. In the morning, the reconnaissance squad passed near the block and saw that it was littered with the corpses of the rebels. On April 9, a weak attack was made, which the garrison easily repulsed, On the same day, reinforcements arrived and after several skirmishes, the rebels lifted the siege and retreated to the steppe.
