= Battle of the Cape Chagrai =

- Part of Adai rebellion
Date	6 August [O.S. 25 July] 1870
Location	Ural Oblast (Modern day Kazakhstan)
Result	Russian victory

Belligerents
Russian Empire	Kazakh rebels Khiva

Commanders and leaders
(Russian Empire) Aniki Korjinov	Azberken Muntaipas

Strength
20	800

Casualties and losses
2–3 killed 15–17 wounded	Unknown, but more than Russians

Battle of the Cape Chagrai (Russian: Бой при мысе Чаграе) was a battle between column from 20 Cossacks and several hundreds Kazakh and Uzbeks from Adai tribe and Khanate of Khiva.

== Background ==
In 1870, a major uprising broke out on Mangyshlak Island and Lieutenant Baykov was sent to suppress it. The detachment went very deep into the steppe, of which the rebellious Kazakhs wanted to take advantage of. The vanguard of 20 people separated from the main detachment, and the cavalry launched attacks to the rear to slow down the actions of the main troops, after which they planned to proceed with the extermination of this column.

== The forces of the parties ==
=== Russian detachment ===
The team consisted of 14 Don, 2 Orenburg and 4 Ural Cossacks, There were only 6 rifles in the squad, all the others were armed with smoothbore pistols, the squad had no more than 200 rounds None of the expedition participants except Commander Korzhikov was a veteran, they were all recruits.

=== Kazakh forces ===
The Kazakh detachment initially consisted of 150 people, but 650 more joined them, this army was very well equipped with iron chain mail, which could not be shot through, the Kazakhs had firearms.

== Battle ==
The team set out on a hike early in the morning on July 24. After walking about 10 versts, they came to the river, where they noticed a group of 150 horsemen who immediately decided to strike at the Russians. A detachment of Cossacks laid the camels in a infantry square in a checkerboard pattern and tied their legs. The Kazakh detachment was better armed than the Russians, commander Korzhikov ordered to save ammunition and shoot only if absolutely necessary. Korzhikov realized that he was in a critical situation, and therefore sent a messenger to Korzhikov realized that he was in a critical situation, and therefore sent a messenger to Orzhenets. Reinforcements galloped up to the Kazakhs, and they decided to storm the Square, by this point the Russians realized that they could not shoot through the chain mail of the rebels. At a military meeting, they decided to take the fight to hand-to-hand. Russians aimed at places where a saber could penetrate the armor of the rebels. They grabbed them by the beard, hair and tore their weapons out of their hands; the Russians fought desperately. The Kazakhs by this time were trying to kill Korzhikov, who was in charge of everything. One bullet hit him and punctured his lung, but he tried to continue his command. By this time, almost all the Cossacks were wounded, and two were killed. The situation was becoming desperate. All this time, reinforcements with one cannon were coming to the detachment, the Kazakhs were informed that the enemy would soon arrive to help. They tried to attack for the last time, however, the help previously gave one volley and thereby instilled hope in Korzhikov's team. The Cossacks shot all their cartridges at the Kazakh horses and forced them to retreat.
