= Kazakh–Uzbek War (1534) =

War between the Kazakh and Bukhara khanates

- Part of the Kazakh–Uzbek Wars and Kazakh–Nogai Wars
Date	1534
Location	Tashkent, Uzbekistan
Result	Kazakh victory

Belligerents
Kazakh Khanate	Khanate of Bukhara; Nogai Horde

Commanders and leaders
(Kazakh Khanate) Tugum Khan	(Khanate of Bukhara) Ubaidullah Khan

The Kazakh–Uzbek War was a conflict in the first half of the 16th century between the Kazakh Khanate and the Khanate of Bukhara, where the Kazakhs fought over the control of Tashkent and succeeded in 1534.

Since the 1520s, the first internecine war for the throne has been going on in the Kazakh khanate. Long before that, Kasym Khan annexed the lands of the Nogai Horde during the Kazakh–Nogai War, but after his death, the Nogais, as Trepavlov writes, began the Nogai "reconquista" by reconquering their lands and the capital, driving the Kazakhs beyond the Irtysh. But already in 1530, the Kazakhs were able to defeat the Nogais across the Emba River.

The struggle between the Kazakh rulers and the Shaybanids continued even after Tahir Khan left the historical scene, as the Kazakhs posed a real threat to the northern territories of the Uzbek state.

In September of 1536, a letter from the Russian ambassador D. Gubin was delivered to Moscow, stated as;

"And the Stekhani (of Tashkent), Sovereign, the ambassador came to the prince and the Murzas, so that the prince and the Myrzas would go against the Kaki (Kazakhs - author), and Tashkeni, Sovereign, from the Cossacks, they say good, good is necessary. They expect it to be raised this summer or in winter. And that's why, Sir, the Cossacks say they won't go to Nagai, because they're fighting in Tashkent."

In 1537, Uzbeks, Moghuls, and Nogais defeated the Kazakhs in Battle of San Tash, which killed 37 Kazakh sultans. It was stated as:

"The Uzbek troops captured the cities of Sawran, Sayram, Sozak, Sighnaq, and Turkistan from the Kazakhs."
