= Syzdyk Sultan =

Sultan and statesman

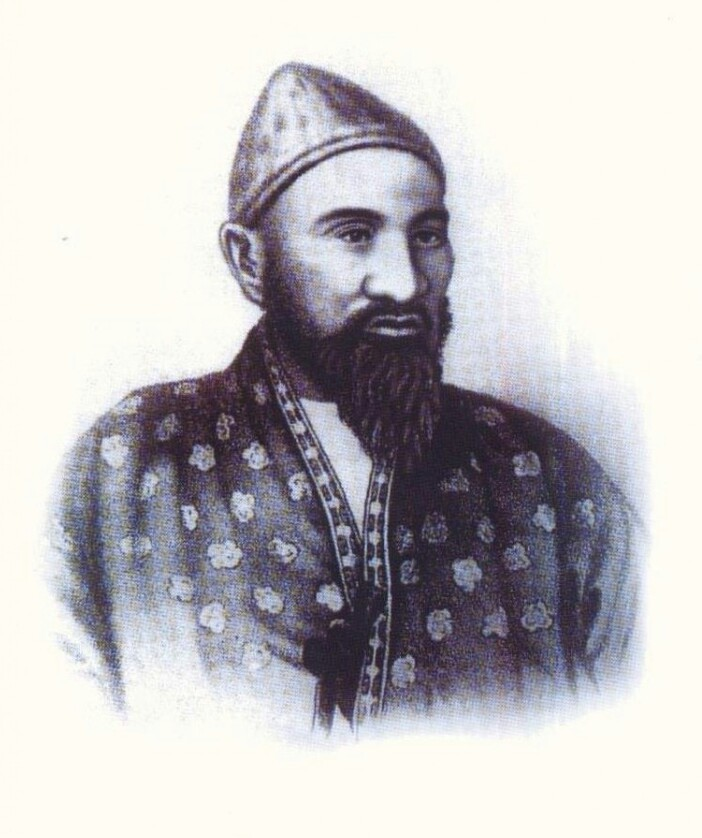
- Born: 1837
- Died: 1910
- Allegiance: Kazakh Khanate; Khanate of Kokand; Russian Empire

Syzdyk Sultan (Kazakh: Сұлтан Сыздық Кенесарыұлы; 1837–1910) Chingizid, was a Sultan and statesman in the Kazakh Khanate. He was son of the last Kazakh Khan Kenesary Kasymuly, Hakim Teriskeyav Kokand khanate, pansat bashi in Kokand army. In historiography, he is also referred to as Sadiq Sultan.

== Biography ==
=== Childhood ===
His mother was the second wife of Kenesary Khan Janyl Khanum. In the year of his father's death (1847) Syzdyk was ten years old. He grew up with two half-brothers. He trained in military affairs living among konyrat children around Turkestan and Suzak, near the Karatau mountains and in the lower reaches of the Shu river. These lands were then under the rule of the Kokand Khanate.

== Service in the Kokand Khanate ==
=== Battle of Uzunagach ===
Syzdyk received education from the local mullah, before joining the army of Kokand. He and his two brothers Tayshyk and Ahmet were given the title pansat basi (Commander 500). In 1860, in the South region of Kazakhstan Vernogov tried to break the Russian troops.

The Khan's army had been mobilized for a battle in Uzunagache. In the battle, Lieutenant Colonel Kolpakovsky managed to fight off the attacking forces and enemy army commander Kanagatshaha parvanshi Kokand. A small Kazakh detachment headed by Tayshyk, Syzdyk, and Ahmet created a diversion that allowed Kokandtsy to safely escape from persecution. After a few of defeats as part of Kokand army, Tayshyk and Ahmed decided that Kokand had no prospects. They continued to "serve a strong Russia, if it will be possible otherwise we will use the calmness in her citizenship."

Syzdyk chose another way: "If the Russian take Kokand, I go to Bukhara; if they take Buharu- to another state ... But I will not leave the path of my father." Thus, a short time later the brothers were on opposite sides of the front. Tayshyk and Ahmet shifted thousands of Kazakh families close to them.
