= Kazakh–Nogai War (1577) =

Part of Wars between the Kazakh Khanate and the Nogai Horde

- Part of the Kazakh–Nogai Wars
Date	1577
Location	Saray-Jük, Tobol, Irtysh, Kazakstan
Result	Kazakh victory: Subjugation of Bashkirs
Territorial changes	Kazakhs capture Saray-Jük

Belligerents
Kazakh Khanate	Nogai Horde; Khanate of Sibir

Commanders and leaders
(Kazakh Khanate) Haqnazar Khan	(Nogai Horde) Tinehmat (Nogai Horde) Bek-Murza (Nogai Horde) Ak-Murza (Nogai Horde) Urus-biy (Khanate of Sibir) Kuchum Khan

The Kazakh–Nogai War (1577) was one of the major military invasions of the Kazakh Khanate on the territory of the Nogai Horde.

== Background ==
On September 1569, Nogai envoys informed a Turkish pasha that Haqnazar, allied with Crimean princes, had attacked their horde "In the name of the Crimean Khan.” The origin of this claim remains unclear. There is no evidence of anti-Nogai negotiations between Bakhchysarai and the Kazakhs. However, this narrative pushed the Nogai court to intensify its diplomatic efforts.

Tinakhmat informed Crimea that Haqazar, who was "skilled in military affairs... and commands excellent marksmen and warriors," intended to march on Crimea after capturing Saray-Jük. He urged Muhammad Giray Khan to support the Nogais to protect his domains. Curiously, the Nogai leaders did not turn to Moscow or Astrakhan for assistance, despite their previous reliance on Russian support against Khakk-Nazar.

From Moscow, Tsar Ivan IV clarified that there were no consistent contacts with Khakk-Nazar. The Kazakh khan had only once sent envoys along with a Bukhara caravan, and Russian officials had dispatched Tatar emissaries as messengers. Ivan assured the Nogais:

"We do not send envoys without substantial reason. If you consider Khakk-Nazar an enemy, we will refrain from any friendly relations with him."

Indeed, no significant Russo-Kazakh ties were observed for some time afterward. However, this was less a result of Nogai diplomacy and more due to Moscow's lack of interest in deepening eastern connections at the time. Meanwhile, the Russian government remained better informed about steppe affairs than the Nogais suspected, disregarding claims that relations between the Nogais and Girays were impossible.

== Course of the War ==
On the Spring of 1577, Haqnazar Khan invaded the territory of the Nogai Horde, attacking the camps of Ak-Mirza and Bek-Mirza, which their herds were seized, and five people were captured. The fifth was released by the orders of Tinehmat and Urus-biy to deliver a message: Haqazar Khan had made peace with Tashkent and Urgench and was now waging war against them. The Kazakh Khanate attacked Saray-Jük, claiming control over the city, and seized all lands east of the Yaik River.

In a report delivered on the November of 1577 by Ivan Myasoyedov from Crimea, stating:

"The Kazakh king Ak-Nazar seeks to capture our settlement in the Nogai territory. He also declares that it is time to reclaim Yaseni, our lost homeland. We must remain vigilant, as the Kazakh king has a strong army."

Another article, dated April, describes a letter from Tinakhmat to Kazy-Murza, a vassal of the Crimean Khan, about Haqnazar Khan’s capture of Saray-Jük and the flight of Nogai rulers. The letter requested assistance from the Crimean Khan. Myasoyedov himself doubted the reliability of these reports, noting Tinakhmat’s reluctance to align with Russian lands, despite previous demands from the Crimean Khan.

Haqnazar Khan also actively fought against the Sibir Khan, Kuchum. Through a series of campaigns, he managed to annex territories in the upper reaches of the Tobol and Irtysh Rivers. Additionally, a significant part of the Bashkir uluses, previously under the rule of the Khanate of Kazan and Khanate of Sibir were subjugated.

The Nogai leaders were aware of the Kazakh Khan’s ambitions. Rumors of Haqnazar’s possible alliances with the Crimean Tatars and Russians worried them. To Din-Ahmed, the possibility of a Kazakh–Crimean–Russian coalition was particularly alarming, as it could leave the Nogais geopolitically encircled by powerful neighbors.

== Sources ==
- Trepavlov, V. V. (2016). History of Nogai Horde (in Russian). Kazan: Publishing house "Kazan real estate". pp. 331–332. ISBN 978-5-9907552-5-3.
- Atygaev, Nurlan (2023). The Kazakh Khanate: essays on the foreign policy history of the XV-XVII centuries [not in English] (in Russian). Almaty: Eurasian Scientific Research Institute of the Yasavi Moscow State Technical University. p. 98. ISBN 978-601-7805-24-1.
- Isin, A. (2002). Restoration of Kazakh-Russian relations and relations between the Kazakh and Nogai states in the 70s of the 16th century (in Russian). Semipalatinsk: Tengri. pp. 103–104. ISBN 9965492298.
- Abuseitova, M. H. (1985). the Kazakh Khanate in the second half of the XVI century (in Russian). Almaty: «Science». p. 54.
