= Kazakh–Nogai War (1568–1569) =

War between the Kazakh Khanate and the Nogai Horde

- Part of the Kazakh–Nogai Wars and the Russo-Turkish War (1568–1570)
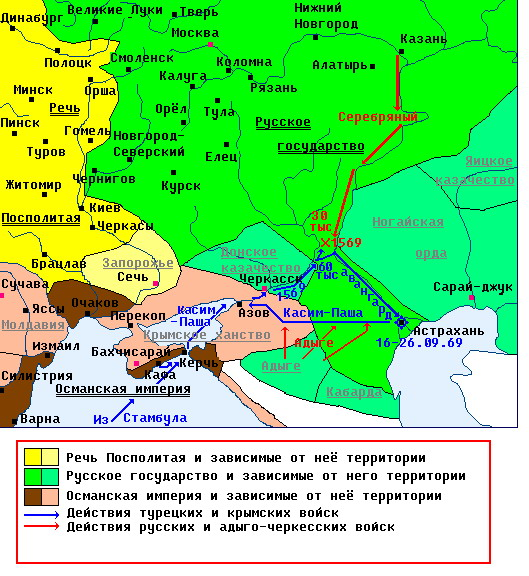
- Map in 1568, during the Russo-Turkish War (1568–1570)
Date	1568–1569
Location	Ural River and the Irtysh River, Kazakhstan and Russia
Result	Kazakh victory: Kazakh retreat from Astrakhan
Territorial changes	Annexation of the Ural and Irtysh valleys by the Kazakh Khanate

Belligerents
Kazakh Khanate	Nogai Horde Supported by: Tsardom of Russia

Commanders and leaders
(Kazakh Khanate) Haqnazar Khan (Kazakh Khanate) Shigai Khan (Kazakh Khanate) Jalym Sultan	(Nogai Horde) Din-Ahmed Biy (surrendered) Supported by: (Tsardom of Russia) Ivan the Terrible

The Kazakh–Nogai War of 1568–1569 was a military conflict between the Kazakh Khanate and the Nogai Horde, supported by the Tsardom of Russia. The Kazakhs were able to annex the Ural and Irtysh Rivers, but retreated after Russian forces arrived to the city of Astrakhan. The Kazakh northern border was consolidated after these events.

The conflict took place when the Nogai Horde experienced hardships, which allowed the current Kazakh Khan, Haqnazar to lead a series of campaigns against the Nogai Horde.

In the Autumn of 1568, Haqnazar Khan invaded the Nogai Horde in the east. The Russian ambassador E. Maltsev reported in November of the same year that Haqnazar, along with Shigai Khan and Jalym Sultan, had defeated the Nogai Horde. Following this, the Kazakhs were advancing towards the city of Astrakhan. The Nogai Horde soon received the support of the Russian Tsardom, which allowed the Nogai army to defeat the Kazakhs and kill a prince among them. However, Tasmagabetov does not report any victory from the Nogai Horde. The Kazakh forces withdrew from Astrakhan in the Spring of 1569.

== Bibliography ==
- Isin, A (2002). Kazakh Khanate and Nogai Horde in the second half of the 15th - 16th centuries (in Russian). Semey: Tengri Publishing House. p. 139. ISBN 9965-492-29-8.
- Atygaev, Nurlan (2023). The Kazakh Khanate: essays on the foreign policy history of the XV-XVII centuries [not in English] (in Russian). Almaty: Eurasian Scientific Research Institute of the Yasavi Moscow State Technical University. pp. 89–90. ISBN 978-601-7805-24-1.
- Atygaev, Nurland (2007). И История казахской государственности (древность и средневековье): монографическое исследование (in Russian). Almaty: Adamdar. ISBN 9965-884-01-3.
- Trepavlov, V.V. (2020). History of the Nogai Horde. Moscow: Quadriga. p. 1040. ISBN 978-5-91791-352-0.
- Tasmagabetov, I.N. (2005). History of Kazakhstan in Russian sources (XV-XVII). Almaty: Dyke Press. p. 704. ISBN 9965-699-79-8.
