= Ablai Khan Campaigns Tashkent and Khujand =

War between the Kokand Khanate and Kazakh Khanate

Kazakh–Kokand War (1766-1768)
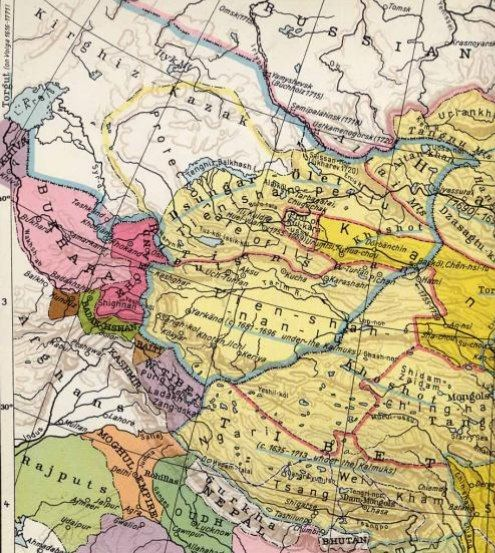
- Political map of Central Asia in 1760
Date	1766–1768
Location	Khanate of Kokand
Result	Kazakh Khanate Kazakh victory: Recognition of authority of Ablai Khan by the ruler of Khanate of Kokand, Irdana Biy.
Territorial changes	Annexation of Turkistan, Sayram, Shymkent, and Khujand; Vassalization of Tashkent

Belligerents
Kazakh Khanate	Khanate of Kokand: Kyrgyz tribes

Commanders and leaders
(Kazakh Khanate) Ablai Khan (Kazakh Khanate) Buri Sultan (POW)	(Khanate of Kokand) Irdana Biy (surrendered)

Ablai Khan Campaigns Tashkent and Khujand, Kokand Campaign or Campaign against Kokand was a military campaign by the Kazakh Khan, Ablai Khan against the Khanate of Kokand from 1766 to 1768.

== Background ==
In the second half of the 18th century, raids by the Kyrgyz reached Sozak and Sholak-Korgan, while the Kokand forces captured four Kazakh towns, including the strategically important Tashkent. The threat from external enemies put the Great Jüz in a critical situation, and its nobility was forced to seek assistance from the influential ruler of the Middle Zhuz – Abylai Sultan.

== Course of events ==
Ablai sent a reconnaissance detachment of 300 warriors led by his adopted son Buri Sultan. The force was surrounded by numerically superior Kokand troops and taken prisoner. Ablai was unable to recover the captured men. Disputes soon broke out in his camp over the division of booty. Abdurakhman kept the detachment for about two months and later released them all without harmэ.

Later, Kazakhs told representatives of the Russian imperial administration that Ablai did not move to assist Buri Sultan because his remaining forces were too small. According to their explanation, he failed to reward his followers with gifts taken during raids on Baldybek’s encampments.

Feeling offended, they divided the remaining captives among themselves and returned to their own uluses, leaving Ablai with little support. Other accounts state that inaction was linked to fears that war with the Kokand Khanate would damage trade relations with Central Asia.

Several elders who had taken part in earlier campaigns against the Kyrgyz reportedly refused to support Ablai, warning that conflict would stop merchants from Tashkent from coming for exchange.

He later led Kyrgyz–Kokand forces against Senior Jüz settlements, raiding them. Following this the Kazakhs launched a series of retaliatory raids against the Kyrgyz. Following these border conflicts, envoys were dispatched in an attempt to restore relations, but Irdana continued his military operations.

After the military defeat, Ablai decided to turn to diplomatic measures. He began secret negotiations with influential elders connected with the Tashkent rulers, offering them a peace agreement. Unaware of Ablai’s recent defeat, the elders sent an embassy to him with rich gifts. However, Ablai seized the envoys and marched with his forces into their lands, which he subsequently devastated. The captured booty was sent to his nomadic camps under the guard of his son Wali.

Ablai also demanded the extradition of a local ruler named Bayastan, who allegedly refused to pay tribute and took refuge in Tashkent. The local governor Mulla Samsi helped Bayastan escape. In response, Ablai ordered Mulla Samsi to be executed, captured his family, and again sent envoys to Irdana-biy. After receiving a refusal and without waiting for the return of the next embassy, Ablai attacked the Kyrgyz again and this time achieved victory.

After the onset of winter, Ablai was forced to retreat. On the way, he sent an embassy to China requesting military support against Irdana-biy, but the Qing government refused.

After returning to his native nomadic lands, Ablai informed the Russian authorities that he had fought to recover the cities taken from him. In 1767, he resumed military operations, and the population of Tashkent agreed to recognize his authority and pay tribute. Although an envoy from Irdana-biy arrived with an expression of submission, Ablai again sent a delegation to China for support, while simultaneously spreading rumors that his request had been approved. These rumors were not confirmed, and the Qing court once again advised the parties to conclude peace rather than providing troops.

In early 1768, Ablai Khan led a campaign against the Khanate of Kokand, subjugating the city of Tashkent. As a result of these campaigns, Ablai restored control over the key cities in the region.

== Campaign results ==
After the expedition against the Kokand, Ablai informed Russian officials that the purpose of the conflict had been to recover seven towns previously seized by Irdana-biy. Although the Kokand ruler did not formally accept territorial concessions, reports indicate that the populations of Tashkent, Bukhara, and Samarkand acknowledged Ablai’s authority.

In 1768, Ablai undertook another campaign in the region. According to contemporary accounts, Tashkent surrendered without armed resistance and agreed to pay tribute. Irdana-biy subsequently sent an embassy to Ablai expressing submission. As a result of these campaigns, Ablai restored his influence over several major urban centers in the area.

It is further stated that the rulers of Kokand and Bukhara recognized his supremacy. In order to consolidate relations, the Bukharan ruler reportedly proposed a dynastic marriage and sent valuable gifts to Ablai.
