= Expedition of Rukin =

Rukin expedition
- Part of Adai rebellion
Date	27 March-5 April [O.S. 15-24 March] 1870
Location	Mangyshlak Peninsula, Russian Empire (Modern day Kazakhstan)
Result	Kazakh victory

Belligerents
Kazakhs of Adai	Russia

Commanders and leaders
Isa Tlenbaev	(Russian Empire) Nikolai Rukin †

Strength
200	38 Cossacks, four officers and groups of Kazakh biys

Casualties and losses
Unknown	Whole squad annihilated

The Rukin expedition (Russian: Экспедиция отряда Рукина) was the first attempt to suppress the uprising on Mangyshlak, due to the incredible numerical superiority, as well as the mistakes of the head of the detachment, the campaign ended with the death of the Russians.

== Expedition ==
Commander Rukin gathered 40 people in the Alexander Fort to suppress unrest in the steppe with a short sortie, when he went on a sortie, the detachment realized that it was surrounded by a huge force of 200 people with 200 guns, the Russians maneuvered for about a day and gained time, However, when the cartridges began to run out, negotiations began in the camp. Rukin told one Cossack:

Our business is bad. Here's my double-barrelled shotgun for you, take it and save yourself, as you know. There's nothing more we can do.

Rukin decided to negotiate. The Kazakhs cajoled him with words about the excellent attitude towards the prisoners and asked him to lay down his arms, the whole squad understood that this was stupid because A similar case occurred in 1717, when an entire detachment died due to the general's excessive credulity, however, Rukin was adamant when the Cossacks came out of hiding a whole crowd piled on them and killed almost everyone, taking 3 people prisoner. Rukin himself decided to shoot himself out of grief.

== Aftermath ==
The victory over the detachment inspired the majority of the population of the peninsula, and the rebels began to attack local settlements, in particular the military capital Fort Alexandrovsky. Rukin was scalped and sent along with the prisoners into slavery to the Khan of Khiva, after the campaign of 1873 they were released.
