= Kazakh–Nogai War (1508) =

Part of Wars between the Kazakh Khanate and the Nogai Horde

- Part of Kazakh–Nogai Wars
Date	1508
Location	Ural River, Saray-Jük, Kazakhstan
Result	Kazakh victory: Kazakhs occupied the Yaik River and took Saray-Jük

Belligerents
Kazakh Khanate	Nogai Horde

Commanders and leaders
(Kazakh Khanate) Burunduk Khan	(Nogai Horde) Alchagir

The Kazakh–Nogai War (1508) was a military conlict between the Kazakh Khanate and the Nogai Horde.

In 1508, the Kazakhs occupied the Yaik River and took Saray-Jük. As V.V. Trepavlov suggests, the Kazakhs were marching in large numbers, "after all, the eastern Nogai outposts did not dare to repel the raid overnight and called reinforcements from the Volga. There is no mention in the archival materials whether there was a battle between the Nogais and the Kazakhs. It is only known that Alshagyr-Mirza returned to his camp in the spring of 1509 and fought against Sheikh-Muhammad. Perhaps these events were reflected in the well-known epic "Koblandy Batyr," where it is said that during one of his campaigns, Alshagyr, capturing the people of Koblandy Batyr, destroyed the city of Karaspan. According to S. Zholdasbayuly, this city was located on the left bank of the Syr Darya River. In the following years, the Crimean campaigns were repeated, and many Nogai uluses were forced to acknowledge their dependence on Crimea.
