= Kenesary's Rebellion =

1837–1847 Kazakh uprising against the Russian Empire

- Part of Kazakh rebellions and the Russian conquest of Central Asia
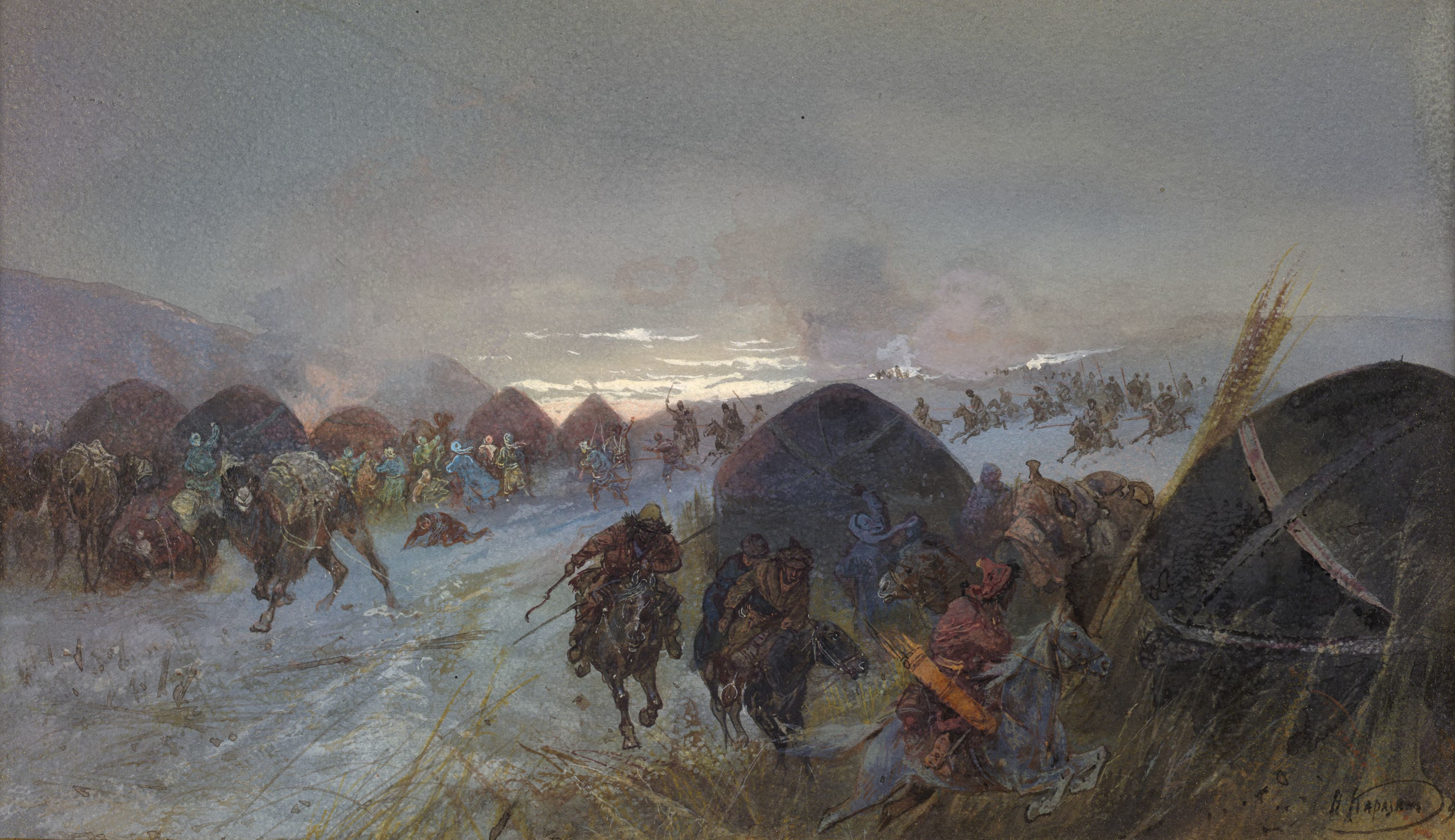
- Cossack raid on the Kazakh settlement, Nikolay Karazin
| Date | 1837–1847 |
| Location | Territory of all Three Jüzes |
| Result | Uprising suppressed |
| Territorial changes | Fall of the Kazakh Khanate |

Belligerents
| Russian Empire: West Siberian General Governorate; Orenburg General Government; Kara-Kyrgyz Khanate; Kokand Khanate (1847) | Kazakh Khanate; Supported by: Emirate of Bukhara; Khanate of Khiva | (Khanate of Kokand) Kokand Khanate (1841–1845) |

Commanders and leaders
| Nicholas I; Pyotr Gorchakov; Vladimir Obruchev; Ağa sultans; Ormon Khan | Kenesary Qasymov (executed); Bopai Qasymova; Nauryzbai Qasymov; Agybai Batyr; Iman Dulatuli; Buharbay Estekbaiuly; Basygara Batyr; Zhanaidar Batyr; Zholaman Tlenshiuly; Eset Kotibaruli; Suranshy Batyr; Zhankozha Nurmuhammeduly | (Khanate of Kokand) Muhammad Ali Khan (Khanate of Kokand) Muhammad Khudayar Khan |

Strength
| Unknown | 20,000 (1844–1845) | 5,000 (1841) |

Kenesary's Rebellion (Kazakh: Кенесары көтерілісі, romanized: Kenesary köterılısı) was the longest uprising of the Kazakh people on the territory of modern Kazakhstan under the leadership of Khan Kenesary Qasymov against the Russian Empire.

== Background ==
During the 18th century, the influence of the Russian Empire in the Kazakh hordes (juzes) increased. In 1731, the Khan of the Junior Zhuz Abul Khair Khan recognized the protectorate of the Russian Empire. In 1740, the Khan of the Middle Zhuz, Ablai, also became a Russian citizen. All subsequent khans were appointed by the Russian government. From the 18th century to the first half of the 19th century, the lines of Russian fortifications gradually moved deeper into the steppe. To control the region were built: Orenburg, Petropavlovsk, Akmolinsk, Semipalatinsk and other fortifications.

In 1822, Emperor Alexander I issued a decree on the introduction of the "Charter on the Siberian Kirgiz" developed by M. M. Speransky, which eliminated the khan's power in the Kazakh zhuzes. The right to collect yasak from trade caravans was also transferred to the competence of district orders. Often, the orders of the volosts in the, Junior Zhuz violated the nomadic routes of the Kazakh clans, which also caused discontent among the nomads. The political views of Kenesary were formed in the 1st quarter of the 19th century, when the Russian Empire more and more penetrated into the depths of the Kazakh Steppe. The rebellious warriors were led by active representatives of the Kazakh nobility. It was during this period during the rebellion that Kenesary became its political leader. During these years he took an active part in the movement led by his brother Sarzhan.

== Uprising ==
Understanding the military and numerical superiority of the Russian troops, Kenesary carefully prepared for military operations. His military detachments constantly underwent combat training; fugitive Russian and foreign gunsmiths were involved.

In 1837 the Kenesary detachment managed to successfully carry out an operation to capture a caravan moving from Petropavlovsk to Tashkent, accompanied by a convoy of 55 Cossacks led by cornet Alexei Rytov. A small detachment of Cossacks under the command of Rytov was surrounded by rebels, however, he was able to repel the attack of the Kazakhs. In a bloody battle, the Cossacks killed 50 attackers, captured one banner, 33 lances, 9 guns, 5 sabers and 10 scimitars, while losing 27 people killed. According to Russian reports, up to 350 rebels were killed. Fear of new raids forced the Russians to put the border lines on alert.

Large-scale military operations, Kenesary began in the spring and summer of 1838, besieging Akmolinsk. After besieging the decree, Kenesary with his detachment went to Turgai. In Turgay, the army of Zholaman Tlenshiuly joined him.

In 1839, an expedition was undertaken to the steppe with artillery, near Jeniz-Agach, the Kazakh rebels were defeated and the Russians occupied this point.

=== Kazakh campaign of 1843—1844 ===
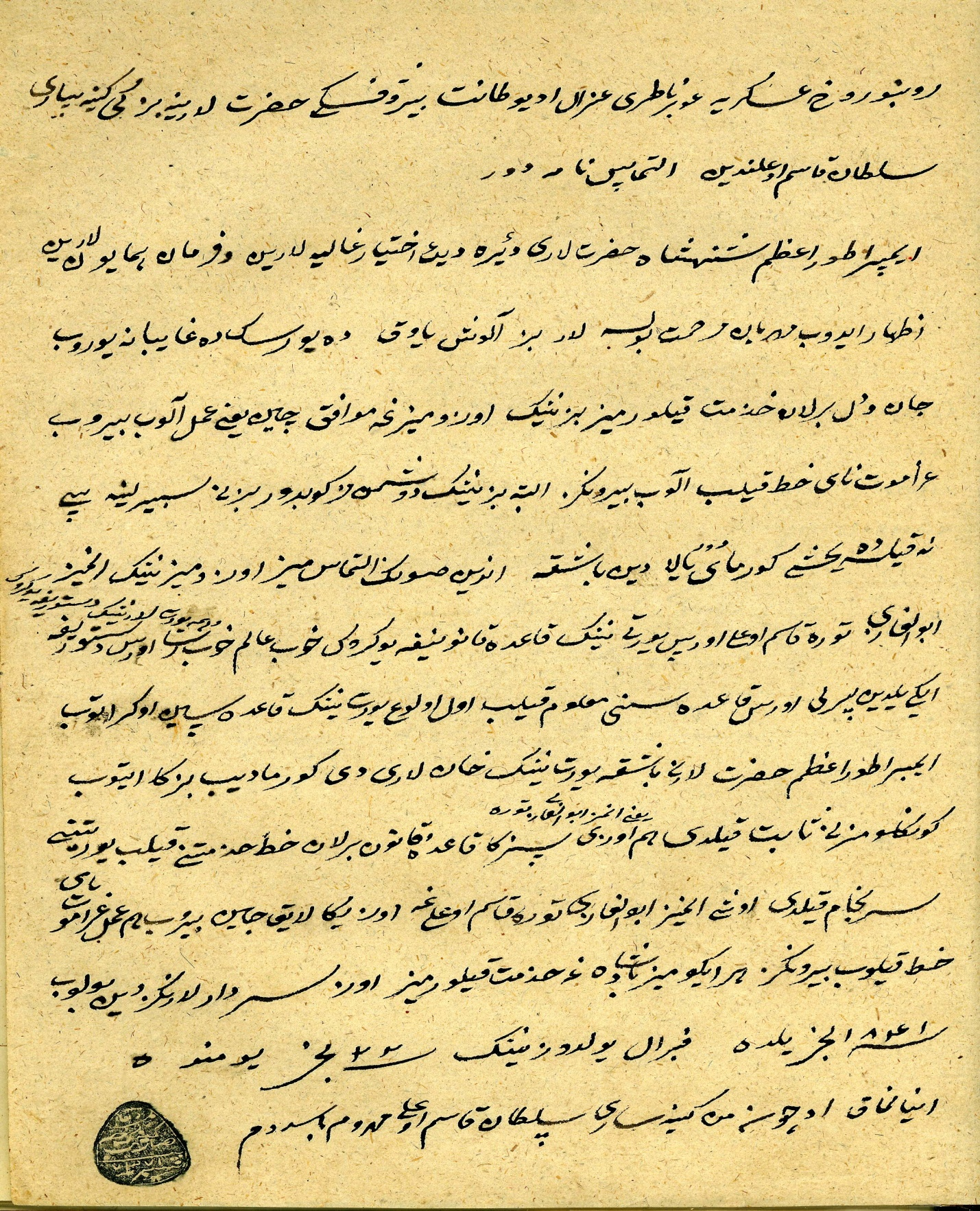
Letter from Kenesary Kasymov to the military governor of Orenburg. February 22, 1841.

Separate detachments of rebels attacked Russian trade caravans heading from the Siberian line, and from Troitsk to Tashkent. By these events, Kenesary significantly paralyzed Russian trade in the Central Asian markets. To suppress the uprising, a punitive detachment of 1900 people was sent from Orenburg, led by military foreman Lebedev. He was joined by hundreds of Kazakhs from the clans Kypchak and Kerei, dissatisfied with Kenesary. Kenesary, who knew the region well, went on the offensive and on the night of July 20–21, 1844, utterly defeated the detachment of Sultan Zhantorin. The military foreman Lebedev, for slowness and failure to provide immediate assistance, was removed from command of the military detachment. Inspired by the victory, the main forces of Kenesary attacked the Catherine Fortress on August 14, 1844, burning the suburbs; 40–100 people were taken prisoner.

Lebedev's detachment managed to capture the nomad camps of the Kenesary auls for the winter and defeat them. They captured 14 people, including several relatives of Kenesary. Of the auls subject to Kenesary, there were 50 people killed. But Lebedev's detachment could not develop a further offensive on the Kazakh steppes. This was interrupted by the spring flood. Lebedev and his detachment had to go back. However, these expeditions undermined the authority of the rebellious Khan among the locals. In 1844, the expedition of General Zhemchuzhnikov acted against Kenesary. On the part of the Orenburg governorate, a detachment was formed from the Kazakhs loyal to the Russian government, on the part of the Siberian Governor General, two detachments were formed: one, under the command of Yesaul Lebedev, consisting of 250 people with two guns, and the other, under the command of the centurion Falileev, consisting of 150 Cossacks. However, the Russian detachments were unable to connect in time, and Lebedev's detachment had to return to Orsk. Kenesary managed to defeat the Kazakh detachment of Akhmet Dzhantyurin. The remnants of the detachment united with the detachment of General Zhemchuzhnikov. On August 22, 1844, Russian troops reached the Mugodzhar Mountains, but Kenesary left the encirclement. Having achieved nothing, the Russian detachments returned to the Siberian line.

In parallel, a detachment under the command of Dunikovsky joined the expedition and on July 21 defeated Kanesary on the Tobol River, Kanesary was able to inflict significant damage to the vanguard, which consisted only of Kazakhs. The Russians forced the Kenesars to retreat in flight.

Kenesary understood that he needed to temporarily enter the trust of Orenburg department, and, if possible, avoid conflict with him. Therefore, for some time he stopped hostilities on the Orenburg line, and moved the center of military clashes against the West Siberian General Government. Wandering in the space between the Syr Darya river and Lake Tely-Kul, Kenesary in 1842 made an armed attack on the territories subordinate to the West Siberian Governorate.

== Defeat of the uprising ==
In 1846, under pressure from the Russians, Kenesary Khan was forced to leave the territory of the Middle Zhuz. During this period, Kenesary directed the main blow against the Kokand Khanate. Among the Kazakhs of the northern regions of the Senior Zhuz, an uprising also began. The Russian government sent General Vishnevsky against Kenesary. Together with the Kazakh ağa-sultans, Vishnevsky overtook Kenesary near Lake Balkhash. Unable to withstand the siege, the Kazakh Khan migrated to the central regions of the Senior Zhuz. However, the Kyrgyz manaps sought to take Russian citizenship in order to get rid of the Kokand oppression. Sultans of the Senior Zhuz swore allegiance to Russia.

== In art ==
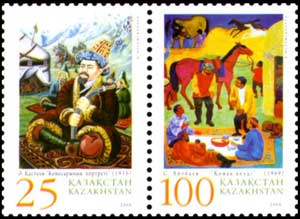

- Kenesary appears in Jules Verne's novel Michael Strogoff as the Tatar khan Feofar. At the insistence of Ivan Turgenev, the French writer's novel was translated into Russian and published in St. Petersburg in 1900.
- In 1969, the famous Kazakh writer Ilyas Esenberlin wrote a novel about him called Khan Kene (the third part of the famous trilogy Nomads).
- In 2008, Kazpost issued a 25 tenge postage stamp entitled “Portrait of Kenesary” by artist Abilhan Kasteev.
- In 2015, director Satybaldy Narymbett filmed the movie Amanat (2015) about Kenesary Kasymov. Amanat" about Kenesary Kasymov.
- In 2017, a documentary film by director Mukhtar Umarov, “Kenesary - The Last Battle,” about Kenesary Kasymov, was expected to be released.
