= Kenesary Qasymuly =

Last Khan of the Kazakh Khanate (1841–1847)

Kenesary Qasymuly Кенесары Қасымұлы
- Khan of the Three Kazakh Jüzes; Sultan
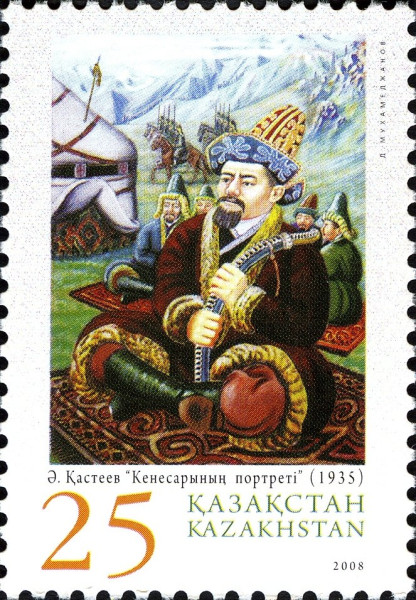
- Kenesary on the Stamp of Kazakhstan, portrait by Abilkhan Kasteev

Khan of the Kazakh Khanate
- Reign: 1841—1847
- Coronation: 1841
- Predecessor: Ablai Khan
- Successor: Khanate abolished
- Born: 1802; Modern Kokshetau, Kazakhstan
- Died: 1847 (aged 45) locality Maitobe, modern Kyrgyzstan
- Spouse: Kunymzhan Khanym; Janyl Khanym
- Issue: Syzdyk Sultan
Names
- Kenesary Qasymov
- House: House of Borjigin
- Dynasty: Töre
- Father: Kasym Sultan
- Mother: Aikumis
- Religion: Sunni Islam
- Seal

Kenesary Qasymuly, or Kenesary Khan (Kazakh: کناشیرین خان, Кенесары хан, romanized: Kenesary xan; 1802–1847) was the last khan of the Kazakh Khanate, grandson of Ablai Khan, from the clan of Genghisid-Töre. He fought to protect the independence of Kazakh lands and attempted to restore the traditional khanate rule.

In modern Kazakhstan, he is revered at the state level as the leader of a rebellion against the Russian Empire. In Soviet historiography, Kenesary was characterized as the leader of the reactionary feudal-monarchist movement aimed at separating Kazakhstan from Russia.

== Biography ==
Kenesary was born into a noble and wealthy Genghisid Töre clan. His grandfather - Ablai Khan was one of the most significant rulers of Kazakh Khanate. His grandmother was a daughter of Dzungar Khuntaiji Galdan Tseren.

From his elder wife Aikumis, Kenesary fathered 6 children - Sarzhan, Yesengeldi, Koshek, Agatay, Bopay, and Kenesary. Bopay, the younger sister of Kenesary, was an active participant in his uprising. Batyr Nauryzbay, the younger brother of Kenesary, born from the 2nd wife of Kasym, also took an active part in the uprising.

== Kenesary's Rebellion ==
During the 18th century, the influence of the Russian Empire in the Kazakh Juzes increased. In 1731, the Khan of the Junior Juz Abul Khair Khan recognized the protectorate of the Russian Empire. In 1740, the Khan of the Middle Juz, Ablai, also became a Russian citizen. All subsequent Khans were appointed by the Russian government. During the 18th – the first half of the 19th century, the lines of Russian fortifications gradually moved deeper into the steppe. To control the region were built: Orenburg, Petropavlovsk, Akmolinsk, Semipalatinsk and other fortifications.

The rebellion led by Kenesary Sultan took place from 1837 to 1847, with it being characterized as national liberation character. The insurrection was mainly aimed at preserving the independence of the provinces, which were not independent. It was aimed at preserving the independence of the lands that were not part of Russia. The rebellion led by Kenesary Kasymuly aimed not only to stop the colonization of the Kazakh lands by imperialist Russia but also to free the Kazakhs of the southern regions from under the rule of the Kokand.

Kenesary demanded that Russia restore the independence of the Kazakh statehood under Ablai Khan, eliminate taxes and withdraw from the military occupied forts. Kenesary's representatives, who were sent to deliver a letter to the West Siberian Governor-General and Tsar Nicholas I of Russia, were captured and punished.

The Kazakhs of three juzes actively participated in the rebellion of 1837–1847 under the leadership of Kenesary. Batyr Nauryzbai Kasymov, Kenesary's younger brother and his staunch associate was the leader of the detachments during the uprising. In May 1838 Sultan Kenesary's detachments captured the Akmolinsk Prikaz.

== Death ==
In 1841, Kenesary was proclaimed khan and briefly established his own independent state. However, in 1847, he was killed in battle against Kyrgyz manap chieftains. Historical sources suggest that his severed head was sent to the Russians.

== Kenesary Qasymuly in art ==
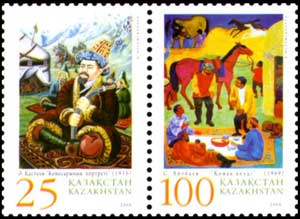

- Kenesary appears in Jules Verne's novel Michael Strogoff as the Tatar khan Feofar. At the insistence of Ivan Turgenev, the French writer's novel was translated into Russian and published in St. Petersburg in 1900.
- In 1969, the famous Kazakh writer Ilyas Esenberlin wrote a novel about him called Khan Kene (the third part of the famous trilogy Nomads).
- In 2008, Kazpost issued a 25 tenge postage stamp entitled "Portrait of Kenesary" by artist Abilhan Kasteev.
- In 2015, director Satybaldy Narymbett filmed the movie “Amanat” (2015) about Kenesary Kasymov.
- In 2017, a documentary film by director Mukhtar Umarov, "Kenesary - The Last Battle", about Kenesary Kasymov, was expected to be released.

== See also ==
- List of wars involving Kazakhstan
- List of Kazakh khans
- Kazakh rebellions
