= Siege of Akmolinsk (1838) =

Episode of the rebellion of Kenesary Khan

Siege of Akmolinsk Fortress
- Part of Kenesary's Rebellion
Date	May 26 – June 2 1838 (Or August 7 1838)
Location	Akmolinsk Fortress (present-day Astana, Kazakhstan)
Result	Kazakh victory

Belligerents
Kazakh Khanate	Russian Empire

Commanders and leaders
	(Russian Empire) Qonurqulja Qudaimende (AWOL) (Russian Empire) Ivan Karbyshev (AWOL)

Strength
(Kazakh Khanate) 2,000	(Russian Empire) 500

The siege of Akmolinsk or battle of Akmolinsk (Kazakh: Ақмола шайқасы, romanized: Aqmola shaiqasy) occurred in 1838 in Astana, Kazakhstan during the Kenesary's Rebellion, which ended with the flight of the founder of Akmolinsk – Konurkuldzha Kudaimendin, along with a small detachment of Karbyshev and the destruction of the fortress.

== Siege ==
Akmolinsk Prikaz was well protected. Deep ditches were dug in the district, all nearby approaches were blocked. The Akmolinsk Prikaz was guarded by the troops of the senior sultan Konurkuldzha Kudaimendin and the garrison of the fortress, led by the Ivan Karbyshev.

The offensive of Kenesary's troops began at dawn. Kazakh archers fired at the fortress with bows, attaching flammable tarred rags to the arrowheads.

Numerous fires broke out in the fortress. At that moment, when part of the garrison rushed to fight the fire, one of the detachments of Kenesary, led by the Basygara Batyr, despite the heavy fire, overcame the resistance of the enemy and broke into the decree.

During the assault on the fortress, Basygara Batyr died. His detachments began to retreat under the pressure of enemy forces, but Kenesary ordered his soldiers not to leave Basygar's body in any case and not to retreat from their positions. Encouraged by the order of Kenesary, detachments of Agybai, Iman and Nauryzbai Batyrs broke the enemy resistance again and penetrated the fortification.

Inside the fortification, a real street fight began, which lasted with unrelenting persistence until dark. At night, the Ivan Karbyshev and Konurkuldzha with small detachments fled from the burning fortress.

The next day, the ruined fortress was still on fire. Kenesary got a lot of trophies and many prisoners of war. The next step was the migration of Kenesary with his detachments to the Turgai steppes, where the detachments of the Zholaman Batyr joined the rebels.
