= Kazakh–Nogai War (1515–1521) =

Part of Wars between the Kazakh Khanate and the Nogai Horde

- Part of Kazakh–Nogai Wars
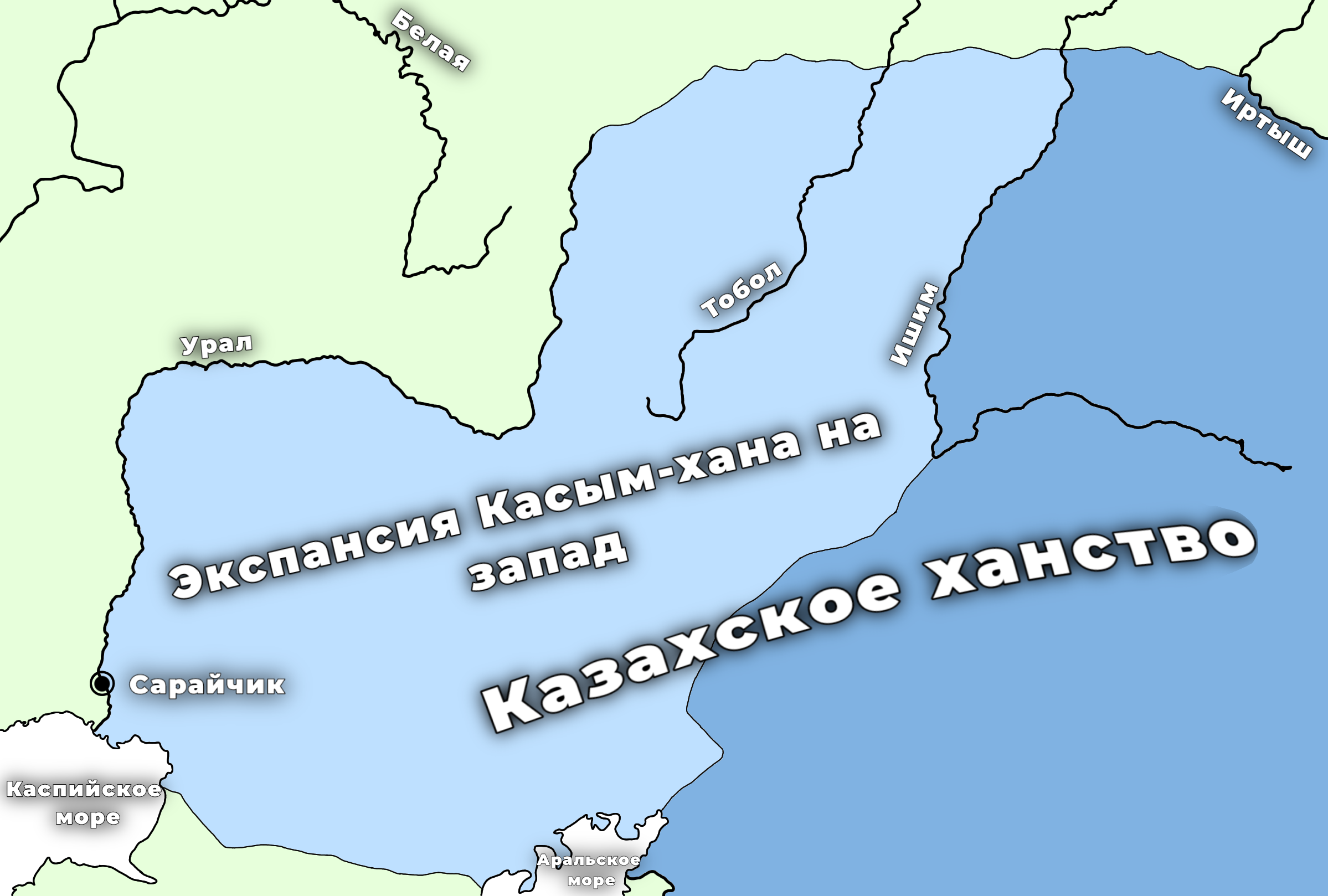
- Illustration of Kazakh invasion of the Nogai Horde.
Date	1515–1521
Location	Saray-Jük, Kazakhstan
Result	Kazakh victory: Nogai Horde temporarily ceased to exist.
Territorial changes	Annexation of Saray-Jük to the Kazakh Khanate; Kazakh forces drove the Nogais to the right bank of the Volga River (1519–1520).

Belligerents
Kazakh Khanate	Nogai Horde

Commanders and leaders
(Kazakh Khanate) Kasym Khan	(Nogai Horde) Shigai Khan (Nogai Horde) Alchagir † (Nogai Horde) Sheikh Mohammed † (Nogai Horde) Sheikh Mamai-Biy (surrendered)

The Kazakh–Nogai War was a military conflict between the Kazakh Khanate and the Nogai Horde from 1515 to 1521.

By the 1510s, a balance of power had been restored in the region with opposing forces. The Kazakh Khanate now controlled all steppe lands north of the Syr Darya, including some cities like Sayram. On the other hand, the Uzbeks under the rule of the Shaybanids dominated Central Asia but could not control the situation in the steppes.

Significant territories of the Nogai Horde became part of the Kazakh Khanate. The capital of the Nogai Horde, the city of Sarayshyk, came under the rule of Kasym-khan and briefly served as his main headquarters. Thus, the Kazakh khan united most of the population of the Eastern Dasht-i Kipchak within the framework of the Kazakh Khanate.

== Sources ==
- Trepavlov, V. V. (2016). History of Nogai Horde (in Russian). Kazan: Publishing house "Kazan real estate". pp. 141–144. ISBN 978-5-9907552-5-3.
- Atygaev, Nurlan (2023). The Kazakh Khanate: essays on the foreign policy history of the XV-XVII centuries [not in English] (in Russian). Almaty: Eurasian Scientific Research Institute of the Yasavi Moscow State Technical University. pp. 89–90. ISBN 978-601-7805-24-1.
- Isin, A. (2002). Restoration of Kazakh-Russian relations and relations between the Kazakh and Nogai states in the 70s of the 16th century (in Russian). Semipalatinsk: Tengri. pp. 103–104. ISBN 9965492298.
- Sultan, Akimbekov (2016). The History of the steppes: the phenomenon of the Genghis Khan state in the history of Eurasia (in Russian). Almaty: «Institute of Asian Studies». p. 729. ISBN 978-601-7550-01-1.
