= Saray-Jük =

Medieval city of the Golden Horde

- سرایجوق (Persian)
- Location within Kazakhstan
- 47°30′0″N 51°44′0″E
- Type: City
- Location: Saraishyq
- Region: Atyrau Region, Kazakhstan

Site notes
- Condition: Ruined

Saray-Jük or Saraishyq (Turki/Kypchak and Persian: سرایجوق, Sarāyjūq; Kazakh: Сарайшық, Кіші Сарай, Saraishyq, Kışı Sarai; Russian: Сарайчик; Tatar: Сарайчык, Sarayçıq) was a medieval city on the border between Europe and Asia. It is located 50 km north Atyrau on the right bank of the lower Ural River, near the modern village of Saraishyq, Atyrau Region, Kazakhstan. The city lay on an important trade route between Europe and China and flourished between the 10th and 16th centuries.

The name Saray-Jük means "Little Sarai" or "Little Palace". The word saray comes from Persian sarāy (سرای), meaning palace, court, or residence, while -shyq conveys a diminutive sense, giving the meaning "small/little palace".

The territory of the medieval settlement of Saray-Jük is protected as a site of historical and cultural heritage by the "Saraishyq" State Historical and Cultural Museum-Reserve. The museum-reserve carries out the preservation, study, and promotion of the monument, while also conducting archaeological, scientific, and restoration work.

Since 2025, it has been designated as a monument of history and culture of Kazakhstan of republican significance.

== History ==
Archaeologist S. P. Tolstov proposed that Saray-Jük was founded in the 11th or even the 10th century by colonists from Khwarazm.

Archaeological excavations indicate that the city could have been founded as early as the 10th or 11th century.

=== The Golden Horde period ===
According to the historian Abu al-Ghazi Bahadur, the city was founded by Batu Khan. Until the end of the 14th century, it was not surrounded by a wall. By the 13th century, Saray-Jük became an important trade center, and was one of the biggest cities of the Golden Horde. In the 14th century, it flourished due to its strategic location on routes connecting the capitals of the Golden Horde with Khwarazm, linking the countries of Europe with Central Asia (including Sogdiana) and East Asia (China). Coins were minted in the city.

Saray-Jük was the center of an urban agglomeration. There are a number of settlements destroyed by economic activity in the 20th century, one of them is the Aktobe-Laeti settlement located on the outskirts of Atyrau. Judging by the archaeological finds, in particular, vessels with inscriptions, Saray-Jük was a city with a developed culture. The city had a unique water supply and sewerage system made of ceramic pipes. There was a metallurgical and pottery production. Its inhabitants were also engaged in crafts, melon cultivation, gardening, and fishing. Its strategic location, linking the East and the West, made the city a major center of trade.

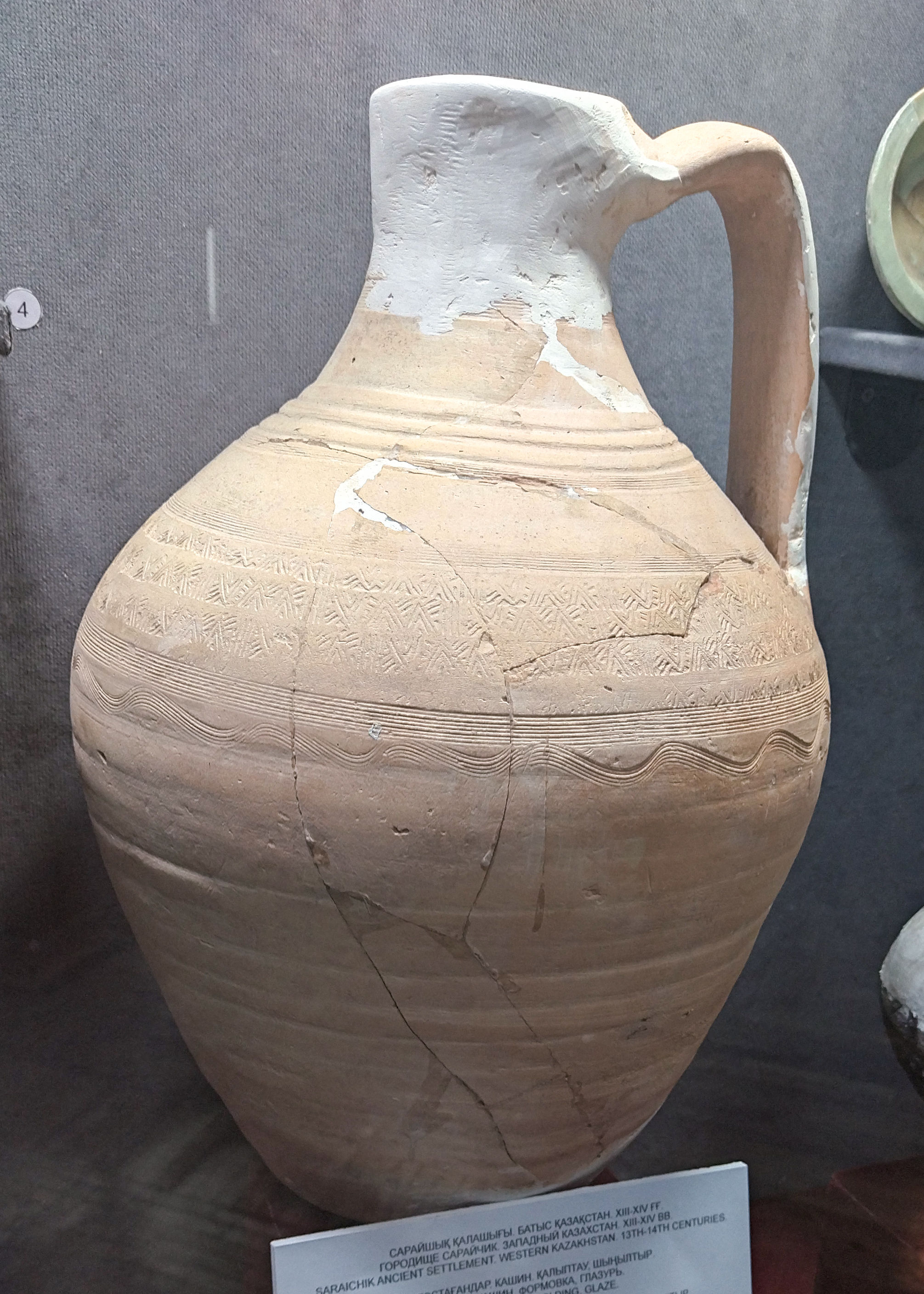
Medieval jug from Saraishyq, Central State Museum of Kazakhstan in Almaty

The Arab traveler and geographer Ibn Battuta, passed through the town in around 1333 on his way from New Sarai to Delhi. In his chronicles, A Journey to the Kipchak Steppe, he noted that the river Uly-su was spanned by a bridge of boats, which reminded him of Baghdad. The city's surroundings served as a sort of resort center, where nobles from across the Golden Horde came to hunt and fish. While in the town Ibn Battuta sold his horses and purchased camels to draw his wagons on the next stage of his journey to Konye-Urgench.

The city was situated on the northern branch of the Great Silk Road. The Florentine financier Francesco Balducci Pegolotti, in his commercial handbook Pratica della mercatura (compiled between 1338 and 1342), mentions Saray-Jük (as Saracanco) while describing the vital trade route from Tana to Khwarezm.

According to Abu al-Ghazi Bahadur, Khans Berdibek and Janibek both ascended the throne and were buried in Saray-Jük.

After the disintegration of the Golden Horde in the 14th century the city fell into decay: in 1395 it was ruined by Timur. There are no precise data on the number of surviving residents. In the wake of this devastation, the settlement was relocated southeast toward the Sorochinka channel.

=== The Nogai Horde period ===
The city was rebuilt in 1430–1440, and became the capital and the only authentic city of the Nogai Horde until its destruction in 1580.

In the 16th century, natural exchange prevailed in Saray-Jük. Uncovered coins suggest that the city retained commercial significance throughout the 16th century.

During the campaign of Nechai and Bogdan Barbosha in 1580, the city was conquered and burned, completely defeated by "thieves", that is, Cossacks beyond the control of Moscow. The city was so devastated that the inhabitants moved to Khiva.

In 1640, with the permission of the rulers of Saray-Jük, 2 kilometers upstream of the ruins of Saray-Jük, the Saray-Jük fortress was founded by Russian settlers, marking the beginning of a new history of the settlement. Saraychik's stanitsa appeared on the site of the fortress, then the village of Saraychik in the Makhambet district of the Guryev region of the Kazakh SSR, now the village of Old Saraishyq in the Makhambet district of the Atyrau region of the Republic of Kazakhstan.

=== The Kazakh Khanate period ===
Saray-Jük was part of the Kazakh Khanate under the rule of Janibek Khan, Burunduk Khan, Kasym Khan.

The headquarters of the first rulers of the Kazakh Khanate was located here.

The significance of Saray-Jük reached its peak under Kasym Khan. It was during his reign that the Kazakh Khanate significantly expanded its territories, and Saray-Jük emerged as one of the primary centers of administration and diplomacy and the de facto residence of the khan. Due to its strategic location on the banks of the Zhaiyk (Ural) River, the city played a vital role in the administration of the state's western territories. According to historical data, Kasym Khan was buried in Saray-Jük.

== Ruins ==
The remains of buildings, workshops and others are situated at the bank of Ural River, which is washing away the ruins. In 1999 a memorial complex was established on the site by Kazakhstani authorities.

== See also ==
Khan's Grave in Saraishyq
