= Nogai Horde =

1480–1634 confederation in the Pontic–Caspian steppe

- 1480–1634
- Location of the Nogay Horde and main Asian polities c. 1500

- Approximate territory of the Nogai Horde at the end of the 15th century
- Status: Horde
- Capital: Saray-Jük
- Official languages: Nogai
- Common languages: Nogai
- Religion: Sunni Islam
- Demonym: Nogai
- History
  - Established: 1480
  - Conquered by the Kalmyk Khanate: 1634
Preceded by
Golden Horde
Astrakhan Khanate
Uzbek Khanate
Succeeded by
Lesser Nogai Horde
Kalmyk Khanate

The Nogai Horde (also spelled Nogay) was a confederation founded by the Nogais that occupied the Pontic–Caspian steppe from about 1500 until they were pushed west by the Kalmyks and south by the Russians in the 17th century. The Mongol tribe called the Manghuds constituted a core of the Nogai Horde.

From the 1250s to about 1300, the Golden Horde's kingmaker Nogai Khan (a direct descendant of Genghis Khan through Jochi) formed an army of the Manghits joined by numerous Turkic tribes. Around a century later in the 1390s, the Nogays were led by Edigu, a commander of Manghit paternal origin and Jochid maternal origin, who founded the Nogai dynasty.

In 1557, Nogai Nur-al-Din Qazi Mirza quarreled with Ismael Beg and founded the Lesser Nogai Horde on the steppe of the North Caucasus. The Nogais north of the Caspian were thereafter called the Great Nogai Horde. In the early 17th century, the Horde broke down further under the onslaught of the Kalmyks.

The Nogais north of the Black Sea were nominally subject to the Crimean Khanate rather than the Nogai Bey. They were divided into the following groups: Budjak (from the Danube to the Dniester), Yedisan (from the Dniester to the Bug), Jamboyluk (Bug to Crimea), Yedickul (north of Crimea) and Kuban. In particular, the Yedisans are mentioned as a distinct group, and in various locations.

== Society ==
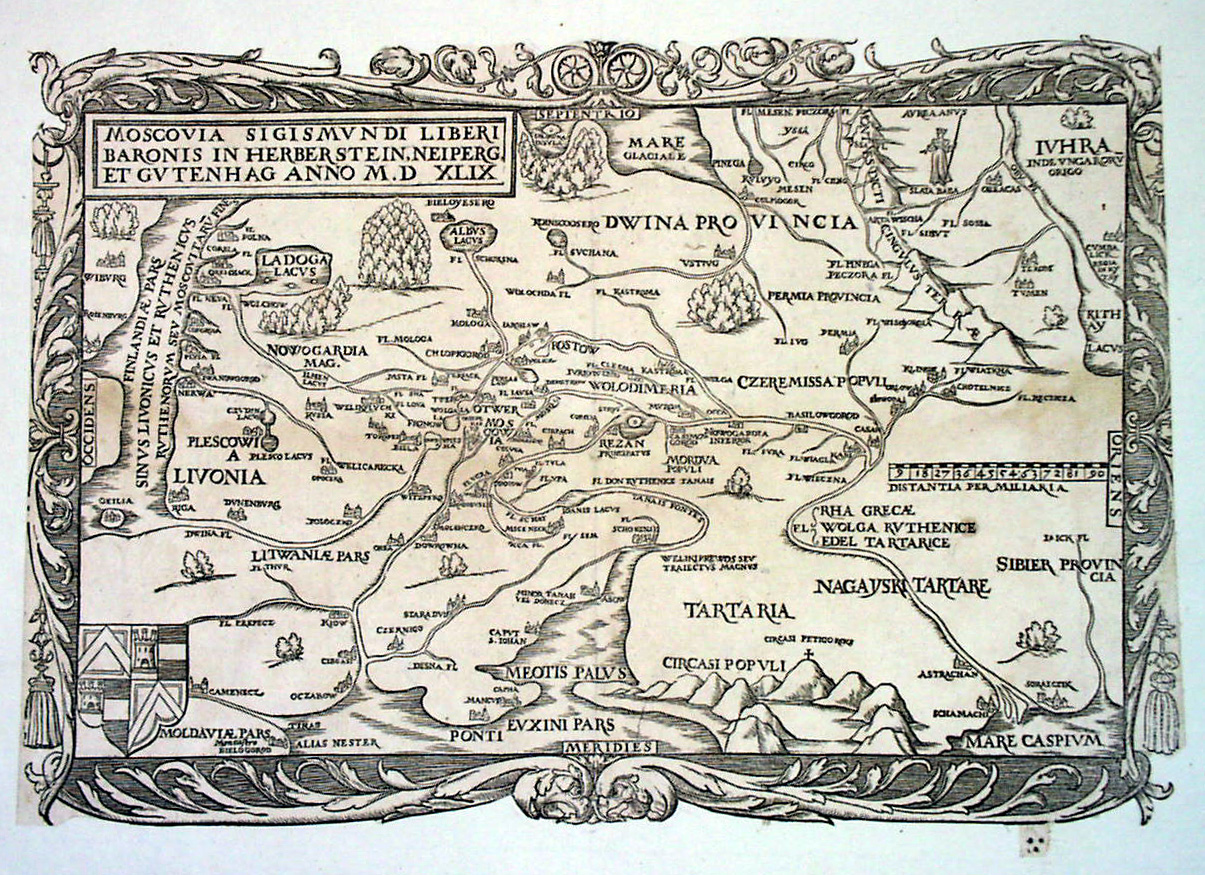
Sigismund von Herberstein places 'Nagayske Tatare' (the "Nogay Tatars") on the lower Volga in his 1549 map.

There were two groups of Nogais: those north of the Caspian Sea under their own Bey (leader), and those north of the Black Sea nominally subject to the Crimean Khan. The first group was broken up circa 1632 by the Kalmyks. The second shared the fate of the Khanate of Crimea.

The Nogai language was a form of Kypchak Turkic, the same language group as that of the neighboring Kazakhs, Bashkirs and Crimean and Volga Tatars. They were mostly Sunni Muslims, but their religious institutions were not centralised and the Nogais strongly opposed any efforts to do so. When the Ottomans tried to impose their control over the Nogai Horde, they heavily supported the creation of new mosques and madrassas as they served as the instrument of political legitimisation for the Ottoman sultan who also served as the Caliph. However, those attempts were mostly unsuccessful and the Ottomans failed to demolish the authority of the tribe leaders and centralize their rule over the Nogais.

They were pastoral nomads grazing sheep, horses, and camels. Outside goods were obtained by trade (mostly horses and slaves), raiding, and tribute. There were some subject peasants along the Yaik river. One of the main sources of income for the Nogais was raiding for slaves, who were sold in Crimea and Bukhara. Hunting, fishing, caravan taxation, and seasonal agricultural migration also played a role, although this is poorly documented.

The basic social unit was the semi-autonomous ulus or band. Aristocrats were called mirza. The ruler of the Nogais was the Bey. The capital or winter camp was at Saraychik, a caravan town on the lower Yaik. From 1537 the second in rank was the Nur-al-Din, usually the Bey's son or younger brother and expected successor. The Nur-al-Din held the right bank along the Volga. From the 1560s there was a second Nur-al-Din, a sort of a war chief. Third in rank was the Keikuvat, who held the Emba.

Political organization was fluid and much depended on personal prestige since as nomads, the Nogai subjects could simply move away from a leader who was disliked. Ambassadors and merchants were regularly beaten and robbed. Stealing horses, looked down upon in many cultures, was an important part of social and economic life on the steppe. Beys and mirzas would often declare themselves vassals of some outside power, but such declarations had little meaning.

== Slavery and raids ==
The Nogai Horde along with the Crimean Khanate raided settlements in Russia, Ukraine, Moldova, Romania, and Poland. The slaves were captured in southern Russia, Poland-Lithuania, Moldavia, Wallachia, and Circassia by Tatar horsemen in a trade known as the "harvesting of the steppe". In Podolia alone, about one-third of all the villages were destroyed or abandoned between 1578 and 1583. Some researchers estimate that altogether more than 3 million people were captured and enslaved during the time of the Crimean Khanate.

== History ==
=== Decline of the Golden Horde ===
After the Mongols managed to destroy the Cuman-Kipchak Confederation and conquered its lands, they established the Golden Horde also known as Ulus Juchi. At its peak it dominated most of the land area between Volga and Danube rivers. During this time Manghit Edigu Bey (Edigu) rose to power and managed to reorganize the various Manghit tribes into the Nogai Horde. Due to his role in defeating and killing Tokhtamysh he was granted a great measure of independence to the Nogai Horde and giving him control over much of the western territories of the Golden Horde. However, soon after his death, at the beginning of the 15th century the Golden Horde had entered a period of internal decline due to struggle for power between Crimea and Nogais and eastern Khanates. Additionally the consequences of Tamerlane’s fatal expeditions, and the rising power of Lithuania and Muscovy also led to diminishing power of the Golden Horde and eventual collapse in 1501, when the Crimeans sacked the capital city of the Golden Horde – Sarai.

=== Independence and the Conflict with Crimean Khanate ===
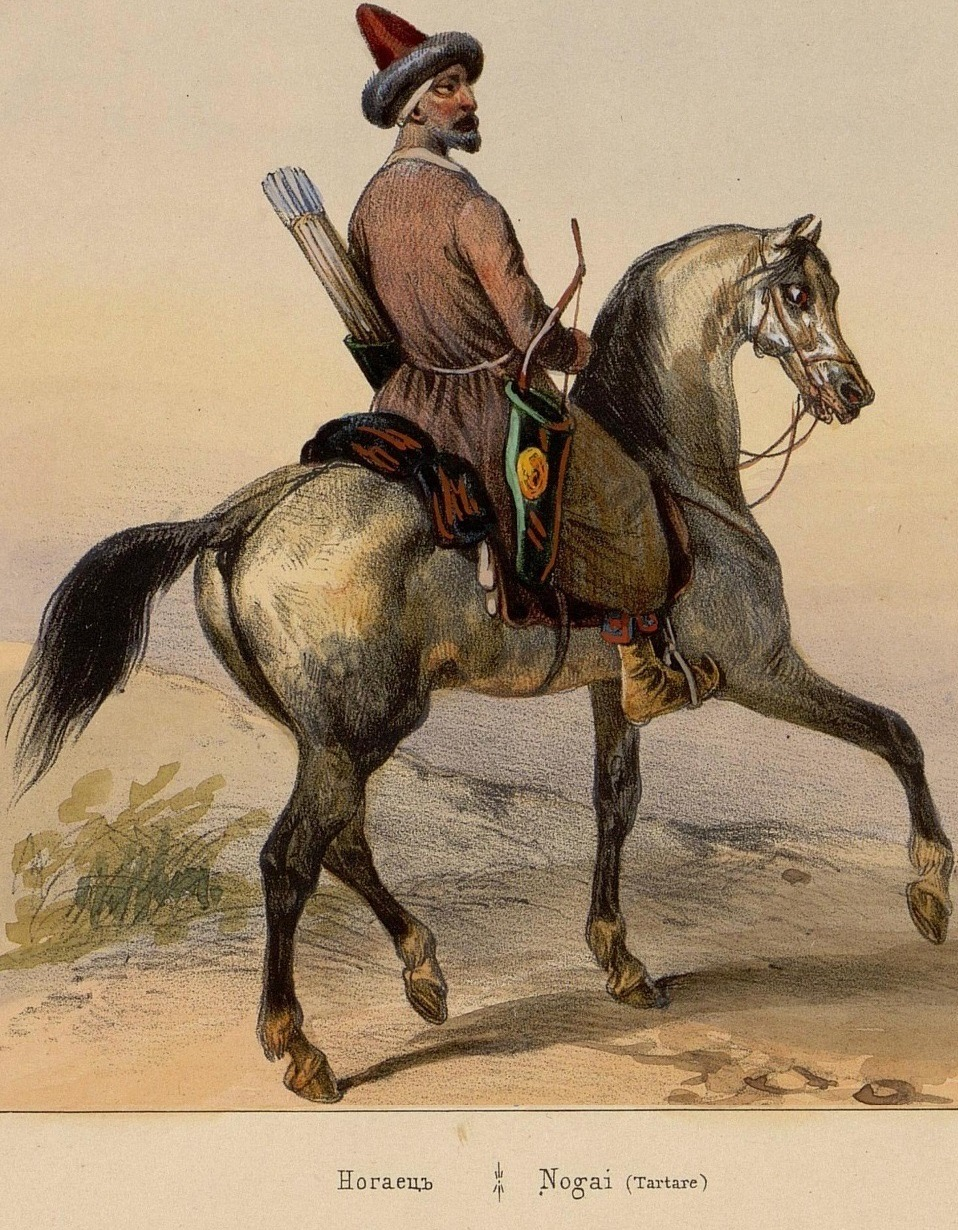
Nogai horse-archer warrior

Due to the decentralised nature of the Golden Horde, the Nogais were relatively independent of their overlords in Sarai and thus didn't oppose the Crimeans in their fight with the Golden Horde. However, after the sack of Sarai and the collapse of the Golden Horde, the Crimeans started to claim legitimacy as the successors of the Golden Horde and thus wanted to expand their rule over the Nogais. They justified their expansion, by invoking the title of "Khan" which showed their connection to Chingissids. But, as the Nogais were one of a few tribes whose rulers descended not from the Chingissids but from their own dynasty, they rejected any authority of Crimean Khan, which eventually led to clashes and conflicts between them. The first and most important attempt of Crimean Khanate to subjugate the Nogais ended when the Nogais killed the Crimean Khan Mehmed I Giray, near Astrakhan.

Such hostilities resulted in the tension between the two nations and thus many Nogai and Crimean sources from that period started depicting their opponents in a very negative light which was then heavily exaggerated in the folklore and other fictional stories of that, which created a sense of heavy anomicity and hostility between the two people.

=== Chronology ===
==== Independence ====
This data is from the English-language sources below. A long list of Nogai raids on Russia and Poland, from Russian sources, can be found at Crimean-Nogai raids.

- c. 1509 Nogais move into lands vacated by Great Horde
- 1519 end of Moscow–Crimean alliance
- 1521 Nogais, driven west by the Kazakhs, cross the Volga and attack Astrakhan.
- c. 1522 Kazakhs capture Nogai capital
- 1523 Crimea briefly takes Astrakhan, but its army and Khan are destroyed by the Nogais.
- 1547 Ivan the Terrible, Grand Prince of Moscow, becomes the first Tsar of All Rus'.
- 1552 Kazan annexed by Muscovy. Nogais lose tribute
- c. 1550–1560 Crimean Tatars and Nogais again attack Ryazan land
- 1556 Astrakhan annexed by Muscovy. Nogais lose tribute
- 1557 Mirza Kazy crosses the Volga and founds Small Horde along the Kuban
- 1567–1571 Muscovite fort on the Terek, south of Nogais
- 1569 Ottomans and Crimeans with Small Horde fail to take Astrakhan
- 1570s Kazakh pressure shifts Nogai trade away from Central Asia toward Moscow
- 1571 Russo-Crimean Wars (1571) Crimean–Nogai attack on Moscow. 100,000 horsemen. Moscow burned
- 1577 Crimean Tatars and Nogais continue to raid the southern Muscovite lands and lead Temnikov to ruins
- 1577, the capital of the Horde, Saraychik, was captured by the Kazakh khan Haqnazar. Endless internal strife brought an end to the Horde as an independent entity. Trepalov V. V. identifies three periods of strife and the agony of the Horde.
- 1580/81 or 1577: Saraichick destroyed by the Cossack raiders
- 1582/83 Muscovite peace with Sweden and Polish–Lithuanian Commonwealth.
- 1584 Crimean–Nogai pillage Ryazan land. Nogais capture "countless Slavic people".
- 1588 many Nogais move to Don. Very destructive fighting between Big and Small Hordes
- 1593 Nogais operate in Voronezh and Livni
- 1594 Nogais (up to 8 thousand) raid southern Muscovite lands. The enemy is besieged and Nogais storm the city.
- 1598 Moscow pushes fortifications south
- 1600 Moscow 'appoints' a Nogai Bey for the first time. Beginning of the civil war among Nogais

==== Decline ====
- 1500–1850 Russian population expands southward and occupies forest-steppe and steppe. This is poorly documented
- 1605–1618 During the Time of Troubles so many captives were taken that the price of a slave at Kaffa dropped to fifteen or twenty gold pieces. Nogais ravage and burn many of the "Ukraine and Seversk" cities, towns, villages and suburbs, killing and taking prisoners from the locals.
- 1616 Raids on Russian borders by large numbers of Nogais
- 1617 Nogais and Azov Tatars invade southern Russia three times to plunder the village and capture prisoners.
- 1618 Nogais release 15,000 captives in peace treaty with Moscow.
- 1619 Isterek Bey dies. Civil war. Status of Beyship uncertain after this
- 1628 Crimean Tatars and Nogais begin to ravage the surrounding towns and villages of Poland, killing and capturing the local population.
- 1633 last Crimean–Nogai raid to reach the Oka
- 1634 major defeat of Nogais by Kalmyks
- 1637, 1641–1643: Raids by Nogais and Crimean nobles without permission of the Khan
- 1640 Crimean Tatars and Nogais terribly ravage Volhynia, Podolia and Galicia, taking a large number of captives.
- 1643 Kalmyks push back from Astrakhan
- 1664 Crimean Tatar and Nogai noblemen with their troops take part in the military campaign against the Polish king and devastate Livny and Bryansk counties
- 1693 Kalmyks attack Nogais, as agents of Russia
- 1699 Nogai forces continue to raid the southern Russian cities.
- 1711 20,474 Kalmyks and 4,100 Russians attack Kuban. They kill 11,460 Nogays, drown 5,060 others and return with 2,000 camels, 39,200 horses, 190,000 cattle, 220,000 sheep and 22,100 human captives, of whom only 700 are adult males. On the way home they meet and defeat a returning Nogai war party and free 2,000 Russian captives.
- 1720s 15,000 Nogai 'tents' flee Kalmyks for Kuban.
- 1736–1739 Russians temporarily hold Azov
- 1770 Yedisans ally with Russia, blocking the land route from the Balkans to Crimea
- 1771 Exodus of Trans-Volga Kalmyks back to Dzungaria
- 1772 many Crimean Nogais accept Russian protection
- 1774 Crimea is proclaimed independent from the Ottoman Empire by the Russo-Ottoman Treaty of Küçük Kaynarca. The khanate increasingly falls under Russia's influence
- 1783 Crimea annexed by Russia; many Nogais move from lower Dnieper to Kuban
- 1783: Kuban Nogai Uprising: last attempt to resist

==== Post-Conquest history ====
During the next 150 years, Black Sea grain ports assist massive southward expansion of Russian agriculture and population.

- 1783 – 19th century: Nogais east of the Black Sea push southeast to their present location
- c. 1860 Several hundred thousand Muslims migrate from Russia to the Ottoman Empire
- 1928 Nogaysky District, Dagestan established
- 2002 Nogay population: 90,700
- 2007 Nogay District formed in Karachay-Cherkessia

== Partial list of beys and mirzas ==
- Temir Khan Nogai (1480): at Ugra standoff, 1481: assassinated Ahmed Khan.
- Musa Mirza (died 1506): said to have 17 sons, among them:
  - Sheidiak (1521): defeated Astrakhan Khanate 1551: near Urgench
  - Mamay Khan (died 1549): Murdered the Crimean khan in 1523. 1530s: near Yaik, then near Kazan.
  - Yosuf Khan (1549–1555): (on Yaik, anti-Moscow) circa 1535: near Kazan. 1549: helped Moscow against Kazan. 1551: near Yaik, broke with Moscow, claimed to have 300,000 horsemen and 8 sons. circa 1552: dissuaded from raid on Moscow. 1555: murdered by Araslan Mirza.
  - Ismail Khan Nogai (1555–1564) (on Volga, pro-Moscow) 1551: near Astrakhan. 1554: helped to take Astrakhan. 1555: sent 20,000 horses to Moscow 1555: Beg. 1556–57: Yosuf's sons (especially Yunus) seized his property. 1558: abandoned and starved, sent across Volga to buy food. 1560: tried to attack Crimea, blocked by Kazy Mirza
- Söyembikä of Kazan, daughter of Yosuf, widow of Kazan Khan, Moscow's captive
- Arslan Mirza, son of Kuchum, killed Yosuf, Keikuvat under Ismael
- Kazi Mirza (died 1577): son of Mamay. 1551: near Jaxartes. 1555: Nureddin under Ismael. circa 1557: broke with Ismael when Ismael appoints Tin Ahmed his successor. Fled to Kuban, founding Small Horde. 1577: killed in war with Kabardians
- Tin Ahmad (1564–1579): 1577 said to support raids on Moscow
- Urus Khan Nogai (1579–1590): 1581 with Crimean Tatars attacked Moscow's frontiers. Killed in battle against the Small Horde
- Ur Muhamed Khan (1590–1597)
- Tin Muhamed (1597–1600)
- Isterek (1600–1618): 1600: was installed by Russians at Astrakhan. 1613: was attacked by Kalmyks, fled to Caucasus, then Azov Sea region. Swore allegiance to both Russians and Turks, then made alliance with Poland, and received ambassadors from Persia, refused to be vassal of Crimea. 1616: was attacked by Crimea, sought Russian protection at Astrakhan. 1618: died under questionable circumstances
- Kanai Khan (1622–1634)

== Genealogy of Nogai Horde ==
House of Manghud

Nogai Horde

Edigu r. 1395–1412
Mansur r. 1419–1427	Ghazi r. 1427–1428	Batyr r. 1412–1419
Waqqas r. 1428–1447	Abbas r. 1473–1491
Khwarazm r. 1447–1473	Musa r. 1491–1502	Yamghurchi r. 1502–1504	Hasan r. 1504–1508
Shaykh-Muhammad r. 1508–1510, 1516–1519	Alchagir r. 1508–1516	Sayyid-Ahmad r. 1524–1541	Hajji-Muhammad r. 1537–1541	Shaykh-Mamay r. 1537–1549	Yusuf r. 1549–1556	Isma'il r. 1556–1563	Yangish r. 1521–1524
Din-Ahmad r. 1563–1578	Urus r. 1578–1590	Din-Beg
Uraz-Muhammad r. 1590–1598	Din-Muhammad r. 1598–1600	Ish-Tarak r. 1600–1619	Kanay r. 1622–1634

== See also ==
- Turkic peoples
- List of Sunni Muslim dynasties

== Bibliography ==
- Khodarkovsky, Michael (2004). Russia's Steppe Frontier: The Making of a Colonial Empire, 1500-1800. Bloomington, Indiana: Indiana University Press. p. 306. ISBN 978-0-253-21770-7.
- Related books by Willard Sunderland (Taming the Wild Field), Alan W Fisher (Crimean Tatars), Martha Brill Olcott (Volga Tatars) and Khodarkovsky (1992 Where Two Worlds Met, on Kalmyks)
- Başer, Alper. “Conflicting Legitimacies in the Triangle of the Noghay Hordes, Crimean Khanate, and Ottoman Empire.” Harvard Ukrainian Studies 36, no. 1/2 (2019): 105–22. https://www.jstor.org/stable/48585260.
- Kara, Dávid Somfai. “BABA TÜKLI AND THE SWAN GIRL. LEGITIMISING ELEMENTS IN THE TURKIC EPIC EDIGE.” Acta Orientalia Academiae Scientiarum Hungaricae 63, no. 2 (2010): 117–32. http://www.jstor.org/stable/23659044.
