= Battle of Uzeni =

One the central episodes of Kazakh–Kalmyk war, 1724

- Part of the Kazakh–Kalmyk War (1723–1726)
Date	21–24 August 1724
Location	Uzeni, Kalmyk Khanate
Result	Kalmyk victory

Belligerents
Kazakh Khanate	Kalmyk Khanate; Supported by: Russian Empire (Note: Provided the Kalmyks with artillery)

Commanders and leaders
(Kazakh Khanate) Eset Batyr †	Dorji Nazarov; Lubji Nazarov; Lekbei Taisha

Strength
757 (Note: 200 Kazakhs, 500 Karakalpaks and 57 Bashkirs)	See below for details

Casualties and losses
415–750 killed	Light

Battle of Uzeni — one of the central episodes of the Northern Campaigns of the Kazakh–Dzungar War (1723–1730), where the Kalmyks won over the Kazakh troops.

== Prelude ==
Against the backdrop of the large-scale invasion of the Kazakh Khanate by the Dzungar army in the March 1723, and the Oirat rulers’ efforts to form a military alliance against the Kazakhs, Kazakh Khan Abulkhair carried out his first raid on the Kalmyk uluses in August 1723 and continued such attacks until August 1724.

== Forces of the parties ==
=== The number of Kazakh troops ===
According to the testimony of captured Kazakh and Karakalpak warriors, Iset Kulubay's detachment was recruited from among the subjects of the Khan of the Middle Zhuz, Semeke, and the ruler of the Younger Zhuz, Abulkhair. In total, the detachment numbered approximately 750 warriors, including Kazakhs (about 200), Karakalpaks (about 500), and several dozen Bashkirs.

=== The number of Kalmyk troops ===
The exact number of Kalmyk troops participating in the battle is unknown. In the summer of 1724, Dorzhi-Nazarov, together with his allied rulers, was able to field an 18,000-strong army. However, it is unlikely that these troops remained in the border steppes the entire summer. Some detachments withdrew from the main army by August 1724. It is likely that during the course of the battle, the number of warriors in the Lubzhi ulus was comparable to Kulubay's detachment. The combined corps of Lubzhi and Lekbey, which set out in pursuit of the Barymtachi, already outnumbered the Kazakh-Karakalpak detachment and likely numbered over a thousand warriors. The Kalmyk forces increased further after Dorzhi-Nazarov's detachment arrived to assist their son. In the final stages of the battle, the Kalmyks' numerical superiority over the Kazakh-Karakalpak detachment was quite significant.

== Battle ==
On 21 August 1724, a detachment numbering 757 men (200 Kazakhs, 500 Karakalpaks, and 57 (?) Bashkirs), under the command of Kazakh batyr Eset Kokiuly, bypassed the Kalmyk outposts and attacked Lubzhi's warriors while they were asleep. The assault was so sudden that Lubzhi himself "barely escaped and fled." The Kazakhs captured a considerable number of prisoners and livestock before turning back. However, Lubzhi managed to regroup his men and overtook the raiding detachment in the Uzeni area.

The first to come to Lubzhi-taishi's aid, leading a detachment of Khoshuts, was Lekbey, eager to avenge the devastation of his ulus by the Kazakhs in August 1723. Lubzhi's messengers also reached the camp of Dorji Nazarov, who immediately marched to support his son at the head of a large cavalry corps and a camel caravan loaded with light cannons. The Kalmyk ruler could not be certain of the strength of the enemy who had attacked the Kalmyk uluses, so a special envoy was urgently dispatched to Astrakhan to the Russian governor Artemy Volynsky. In a letter delivered by the envoy Zamyang as early as 22 August 1724, Dorji Nazarov persistently requested the governor:

To send from Saratov cannons and troops to him, Dorji, for storming those Karakalpaks.

Thus, against Eset Kokiuly's small force were deployed Lubzhi's Torghut and Lekbey's Khoshut cavalry squadrons. Behind them unfolded Dorji Nazarov's main corps, while, if necessary, regular troops of the Russian Empire were to provide support to the Kalmyks. These forces were more than sufficient to crush the Kazakh–Karakalpak–Bashkir detachment, which, though well-armed, was small in number.

On the same or the following day after the raid, Kalmyk detachments managed to catch up with the Kazakhs. The battle began with a clash of cavalry units. The Kazakhs’ and Karakalpaks’ movement was slowed by the captives and livestock they were driving. The only way to break free from the pursuers was to abandon the booty, which would mean the failure of the raid; therefore, the Kazakh commanders held onto the prisoners and stubbornly pushed toward the Yaik river, fending off the pressing Kalmyks. The slow pace allowed the Kalmyk cavalry to overtake Eset Batyr, block his detachment, and force a battle upon the Kazakhs. Ultimately, the Kalmyks gained the upper hand in the mounted fight. The Kazakhs were forced to take up a defensive position. To this end, they built a "living fortress" of horses and camels arranged in a circle, within which they drove the captives and livestock. Behind the animals’ backs, musketeers and archers took cover.

On 22 or 23 August, the main Oirat forces arrived to join the Kalmyk troops besieging the Kazakh "living fortress," together with Dorji Nazarov himself and the camel caravan carrying cannons.

The Kalmyks then began an artillery bombardment of the Kazakh positions, while simultaneously attempting to storm the enemy fortification.

The Kazakhs, abandoning their trophies, wounded horses, and camels, led the remnants of their force in a breakout attempt. Only a few managed to escape the encirclement. Kalmyk cavalry pursued the retreating enemy, and virtually the entire allied detachment was annihilated.

As a result of the battle, the Kazakh, Karakalpak, and Bashkir force lost 750 men killed. However, only 415 right ears cut from the dead Kazakhs were delivered to the Astrakhan governor, which likely indicates that the Kalmyks exaggerated Kazakh losses. Or else that they cut off ears only from those Kazakhs who perished within and around the "living fortress."

== Results ==
According to Russian historian L. Bobrov, the defeat at Uzeninsky reduced the military potential of the Kazakh army and clearly demonstrated that the capture of Kalmyk lands, even in the absence of unity among the Kalmyk nobility, was a very difficult task.

Abulkhair's batyrs' further advance on the Volga Kalmyks was stopped by the combined efforts of their taishas. According to Kazakh historian I.V. Erofeeva, the Kalmyk Khanate's military potential was significantly weakened by nearly two years of fighting with its mobile neighbors. As a result, by mid-1724, the Khanate ceased to be an organized and dangerous offensive force for the Kazakhs.

== See also ==
- Struggle for Turkistan
