= Kazakh–Kalmyk War (1723–1726) =

Northern campaigns of the Kazakh–Dzungar War (1723–1730)

- Part of Kazakh–Oirat War (1723—1730)
| Date | August 1723 — October 1725/1726 (isolated clashes continued until 1729) |
| Location | Volga–Yaik interfluve, Northern Caspian region |
| Result | Peace Treaty of 1726; Peace Treaty of 1728 |

Belligerents
| Kazakh Khanate | Kalmyk Khanate; Supported by: Russian Empire |

Commanders and leaders
| Abul Khair Khan; Sameke Khan; Barak Sultan; Esim Sultan; Eset Batyr | Dorji Nazarov; Lubji Nazarov; Lekbei Taisha |

Strength
| 1723: 20,000; 1724: 10,000—13,000 (March); 757 (August); 1725/1726: 10,000—17,000 | 1723: 5,000; 1724: 18,000—20,000; 1725: 20,000 |

Kazakh–Kalmyk war of 1723—1726, or Western Front, Northern Campaigns, was a military conflict between the Kazakh and Kalmyk khanates, and one of the main theatres of the Kazakh–Oirat War.

== Prelude ==
In February–March 1723, Dzungar commanders suddenly attacked the Kazakh nomadic camps of the Senior and Middle Jüzes, concentrating their main forces along a wide front — from the upper reaches of the Irtysh river to the Chu and Talas rivers. The attack occurred during a difficult season for the Kazakhs — the time of livestock lambing and the transition to spring pastures. The uluses were in their wintering areas and scattered, and therefore were unable to organize resistance. The Kazakhs of the Senior and part of the Middle Jüz crossed the Syr Darya river above the mouth of the Chirchik and retreated toward Samarkand and Bukhara. The Junior Jüz crossed the Syr Darya in its middle reaches and fled to Khiva, as well as north and northwest toward the borders of the Russian Empire — to the territories of the Yaik Cossacks, Bashkirs, and Kalmyks.

=== Cause of war ===
Amid the military successes in Jetisu and the Syrdarya region, the Dzungar khuntaiji Tsewang Rabtan intended to conclude a military alliance with the Kalmyk ruler Ayuka against the Kazakh Jüzes. In coordination with the Dzungar leader, Ayuka planned to launch military operations in the Southern Ural, employing Kalmyk cavalry. However, the Kazakh khan Abulkhair, having timely uncovered the alliance of the Oirat leaders, formed mobile detachments and in the summer of 1723 advanced from the middle Syr Darya toward the Volga–Yaik interfluve.

== War ==
=== Kazakh offensive (July–December 1723) ===
In mid-July 1723, Ayuka sent his envoy Kuzytush to Abulkhair Khan to negotiate peace. On the Temir River, the Kalmyk delegation encountered a 15,000-strong Kazakh army led by Abulkhair himself. However, the Kazakh khan declared:

He is going to wage war against the Kalmyks and the Russians, and forty thousand hordes will be with him.

After this, three Kalmyk envoys were executed, and the remaining seven were taken prisoner. Abulkhair then continued his advance toward the Trans-Volga steppes, seeking to drive the Kalmyks and Russians from both banks of the Yaik River and to expand the Kazakh nomadic territories to the northwest. The rapid advance of the Kazakh army forced the Kalmyk taishas Dorzhi Nazarov, Khoshot-Dondok, and Lekbey to hastily retreat from the left bank of the Yaik to Krasny Yar.

On August 5, Yaik colonel Zakharov reported to the Astrakhan administration that a 5,000-strong detachment of Kazakhs and Karakalpaks had crossed the Yaik and moved westward, intending to attack Russian settlements, as well as Kalmyk and Mari encampments. Following this, Ayuka Khan requested military assistance from Astrakhan governor A.P. Volynsky, who ordered an artillery unit and six squadrons of Russian soldiers to be sent to aid the Kalmyks.

By late August, however, Abulkhair’s forces defeated the uluses of Taisha Lekbey, numbering about 2,000 families. As a result of the fighting, the Kazakhs captured a large number of prisoners and livestock, which were sold to Dorzhi Nazarov, after which the Kazakhs continued their advance deep into Kalmyk territory. In the autumn, the Kazakhs captured 5,000 Kalmyk kibitkas in the uluses of Ayuka and Lubzhi.

Alarmed by the Kazakh attacks on the Kalmyk Khanate, the Russian imperial government in December 1723 sent a decree to Ayuka demanding assistance in repelling the Kazakh–Karakalpak offensive:

The Kirghiz-Kaisaks and the Karakalpaks, having gathered in forty thousand men, are marching against our imperial cities and your uluses, our subject, for the purpose of ravaging towns and villages… You, our subject, must hinder them, so that they may not reach the destruction of our cities and districts.

Following this, the combined forces of Ayuka and Dosang managed to halt the further advance of Abulkhair’s detachments, although hostilities did not cease entirely.

In early 1724, major fighting along the Kazakh–Kalmyk border subsided, except for a Karakalpak raid on Kalmyk encampments near the Guryev town in January. In the spring of the same year, Abulkhair resumed his offensive.

=== Second Kazakh offensive (March–August 1724) ===
In early March, a Kazakh–Karakalpak force numbering 13,000 men invaded the Left bank of the Volga and, some 60 km from Saratov, attacked the uluses of Dorzhi Nazarov. 50 Kalmyks were taken prisoner, and 8,500 head of livestock were driven off. From 50 to 400 people and 13,600 head of cattle were captured in nearby Kalmyk camps.

In April, the Karakalpaks again attacked Kalmyk encampments near Guryev, breaking into the Kalmyk camp but being repelled by Russian artillery.

Seeking to keep the left bank of the Volga under Kalmyk control, Dorzhi Nazarov decided to give the Kazakhs a pitched battle. By August, he had gathered an 18,000-strong army, while evacuating the peaceful Kalmyk population toward the Volga under the protection of guard detachments and Russian troops.

In early August, Kalmyk scouts crossed the Yaik and attacked a Karakalpak reconnaissance party, then retreated. Soon after, the Oirats were overtaken by the Karakalpaks and engaged in battle, though most of the Kalmyk detachment managed to escape. The reconnaissance estimated the Kazakh army’s strength at 10,000 men, and Nazarov’s assembled force was sufficient to repel a Kazakh attack. The Kazakh commanders, in turn, postponed a large-scale offensive against the Volga Kalmyk encampments, relying on the element of surprise.

On August 21, a small detachment of the Kazakh batyr Eset attacked and defeated the ulus of Lubzhi, then retreated. However, the Kalmyk ruler managed to assemble an army and caught up with the Kazakhs in the Uzeni area. In the ensuing battle, the Kazakh detachment was destroyed, and only eight men survived, including Eset himself. A. Volynsky indicated that the Bashkirs were present alongside the Kazakhs and Karakalpaks. V. Bakunin, in a letter dated February 9, 1725, indicated that four detachments of Kazakhs raided the Kalmyks, Dzungars, Bashkirs, and Uzbeks and were defeated in all campaigns.

According to the Russian historian L. A. Bobrov, the Battle of Uzeni reduced the military potential of the Kazakh army and clearly demonstrated that the conquest of Kalmyk lands was a rather difficult task.

=== Kalmyk offensive (August 1725) ===
After Abulkhair’s defeat in the struggle for the Syrdarya region in 1725, about 10,000 Kazakh kibitkas once again moved northwest toward the Kalmyk pastures, assuming that the Kalmyks had retreated to the right bank of the Volga. However, upon learning that the Kalmyks had remained in place, they turned back and stopped along the Emba River. In early August 1725, a 20,000-strong Kalmyk army advanced eastward, covering the distance between the Yaik and the Emba in 9 days. Upon reaching the first Kazakh encampments, the Kalmyks destroyed a thousand yurts and, from another Kazakh ulus of 10,000 yurts, drove off livestock and horse herds.

While returning to the Yaik, Dorzhi Nazarov learned that his army was being pursued by several thousand Kazakhs and Karakalpaks. Remaining near the Yaik, Nazarov dispatched a reconnaissance detachment “in the Kazakh direction.”

=== Third Kazakh offensive (September–October 1725/1726) ===
In September 1725, the Kazakhs launched a new offensive. According to a Kalmyk who escaped from captivity, 17,000 Kazakhs were moving toward the Kalmyks, ostensibly to conclude a peace agreement and then to destroy the Yaik town, intending to settle their uluses along the Yaik River.

On October 6, Saratov authorities reported that 400 Karakalpaks had attacked Kalmyk uluses near the Ryn Sands, capturing prisoners and livestock.

On October 30, a 17,000-strong Kazakh–Karakalpak army appeared in the Karakum region. According to the Samara commandant Kushnikov, they intended to seize the Cossack town and devastate the Kalmyk uluses, then cross the Volga and flee to the Kuban.

In a conversation between the Kalmyk high priest Shakur-Lama and V. P. Beklemishev in February 1726, it was reported that in the autumn of 1725 (Note: But according to other sources, the battle took place in the autumn of 1726), 10,000 Kazakhs under the leadership of Khans Abulkhair and Sameke attacked the ulus of Lekbey and defeated it. However, the Kalmyk nobles managed to mobilize a 20,000-strong army and overtake the Kazakh detachment. Several smaller Kazakh groups were driven to the Caspian Sea and annihilated, while the main force was surrounded near the Yaik.

Thanks to Russian artillery delivered to the Kalmyks in time, they managed to inflict a defeat on the Kazakh detachment, which lost from 1,000 to 2,000 men killed in battle, and to conclude a truce with the Kazakh leaders. The Kalmyks succeeded in reclaiming all captured property and took 13 (or, according to other accounts, 60) amanats with their attendants.

In November 1728, Sameke Khan sent a special embassy to the Volga Kalmyks for peace negotiations. The talks led to mutual reconciliation, allowing the Kazakh khans to shift their main military efforts to the Southeastern Front.

=== Isolated clashes ===
In the spring of 1727, a 30,000-strong Kazakh army approached the Yaik.

In 1729, the Kazakhs raided the uluses of Donduk-Ombo and Dasang, forcing them to abandon their third campaign toward the Kuban.

== Results and aftermath ==
The struggle between the two steppe peoples was marked by considerable violence, but ultimately ended in a "military-political stalemate." As Zh. B. Kundakbaeva notes, due to a lack of resources and manpower, Russia intervened little in the relations between the steppe peoples, instead observing, gathering information, and declaring the Kalmyks' allegiance.

According to Kazakh historian Yerofeeva, despite several defeats, the Kazakhs managed to weaken the military potential of the Kalmyk Khanate and prevent Ayuka from forming a military alliance with the Dzungars. As a result, the threat of a rear-facing attack by Kalmyk cavalry on the western Kazakh territories was eliminated.
