= Tynyshpayev Regional Museum of Local History =

Local museum in Taldykorgan, Kazakhstan

Coordinates: 45°0′58.8″N 78°23′4.2″E

The Tynyshpayev Regional Museum of Local History (Jetisu Region)
- Мұхамеджан Тынышпаев атындағы Алматы облыстық тарихи-өлкетану мұражайы
- Location: Kazakhstan, Jetisu Region, Taldykorgan, ul. Abay 245.
- Collection size: 24,636 items of Museum significance

The Tynyshpayev Regional Museum of Local History is situated in the Republic of Kazakhstan, Jetisu Region, Taldykorgan. The museum opened on 1 March 1974. The museum is named after Mukhamedzhan Tynyshpayev, a prominent Kazakh public figure, Prime Minister of the Turkestan autonomy and a Deputy.

== Description ==
The total area of the Museum is 1457 square meters, the exposition occupies 1091 square meters. Among the exhibits are archaeological finds of the Jetisu region, musical instruments, and utensils, manuscripts etc. The Museum's collection contains 24,636 items of Museum significance, of which 10,919 items belong to the main Fund and 13,717 items to the auxiliary. The purpose of the Museum is to research, collect, store, and enlighten with archaeological items.

The Museum consists of five halls and six exhibitions:

1. The Nature Of Zhetysu region
2. The Ancient and medieval history of the region
3. The Life and culture of the Kazakh people
4. The Zhetysu in the Soviet period
5. The Independent Kazakhstan

The expositions display local flora and fauna; landscape zones; dioramas of lakes; items from the stone, bronze, iron and medieval eras; diorama display "Zhailau"; life and activities of M. Tynyshpayev; December events of 1986, which became the first step towards the establishment of independent Kazakhstan; maps of reserves and hunting farms.

== Source and links ==
- Алматинский областной историко-краеведческий музей им. М.Тынышпаева - Экспозиции музея
- Управление культуры, архивов и документации Алматинской области - Областной историко-краеведческий музей им.М.Тынышпаева
- Музей Танышпаева
