= Semirechie electoral district =

Constituency of the Russian Republic

Semirechie
- Former Civilian constituency for the All-Russian Constituent Assembly
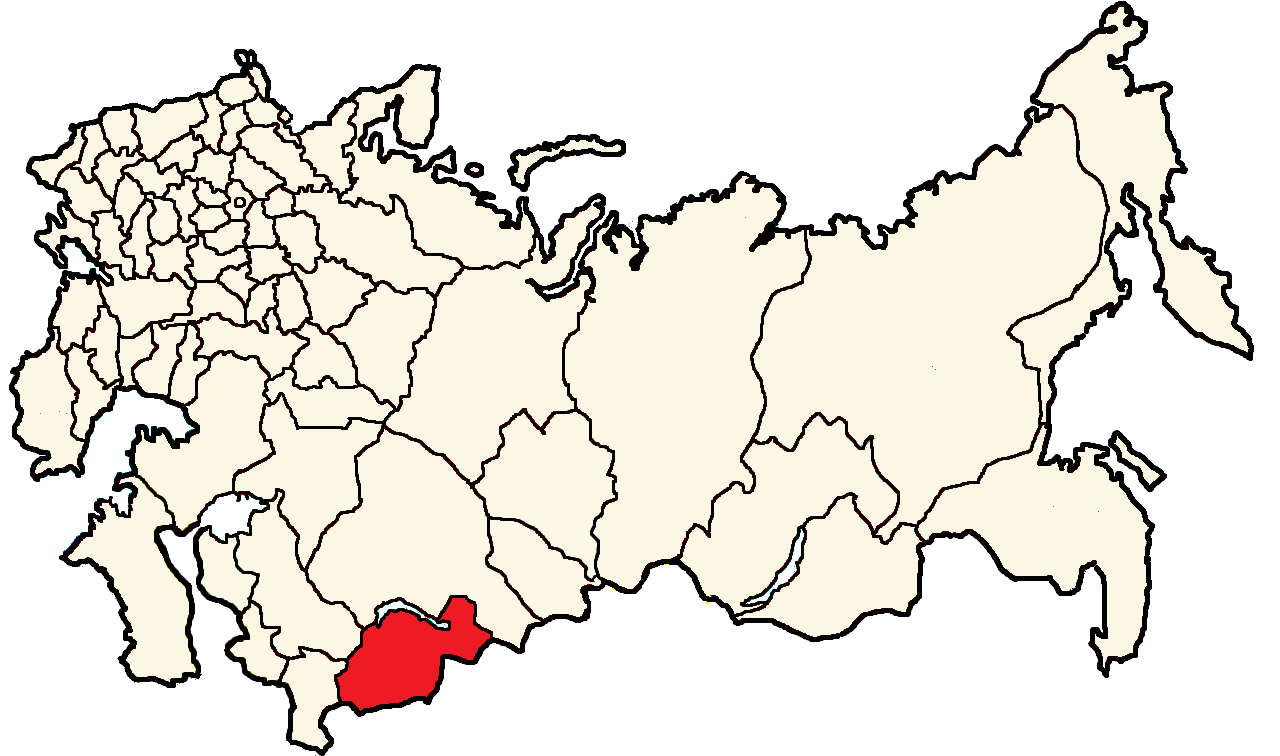

Former constituency
- Created: 1917
- Abolished: 1918
- Number of members: 6
- Number of Uyezd Electoral Commissions: 6
- Number of Urban Electoral Commissions: 1
- Number of Parishes: 180

The Semirechie electoral district (Russian: Семиреченский избирательный округ) was a constituency created for the 1917 Russian Constituent Assembly election. The electoral district covered the Semirechie Oblast. The electoral battle in Semirechie stood between a general soviet list (SRs and Mensheviks) and the Kirgiz-Cossack alliance. The Bolshevik list had been banned.

The Taranchin Committee had been formed in February 1917, as a faction of the General Muslim Committee. In the summer of 1917, it was joined by the Dungan (Hui) community, becoming the Taranchi-Dungan Committee.

== Results ==
Semirechie
| Party | Vote | % |
|---|---|---|
| List 3 - Bloc of the Kirghiz Party Alash and other Muslims (Alash-Semirechie Cossack Host) | 219,832 | 52.85 |
| List 2 - Bloc of Socialists of Verny Town, Soviet of Peasants Deputies, Soviet of Soldiers and Workers Deputies, Kirghiz Socialist Party "Fukhara" (Socialist-Revolutionaries, Mensheviks) | 167,793 | 40.34 |
| List 1 - Tarachin Population of Dzharkent Uezd (Uighur-Dungan alliance) | 28,368 | 6.82 |
| Total: | 415,993 | |

Deputies Elected
| Shebalin | Socialist Bloc |
| Tynyshpaev | Socialist Bloc |
| Amanzholov | Alash-Cossack alliance |
| Jainakov | Alash-Cossack alliance |
| Saurambaev | Alash-Cossack alliance |
| Shendrikov | Alash-Cossack alliance |
