= Kazakh–Dzungar War (1723–1730) =

Part of Kazakh–Dzungar Wars

- Part of the Kazakh–Dzungar Wars
Date	1723–1730
Location	Irtysh, Karaganda Region, Chu, Talas, Fergana valley, Betpak-Dala, Karatau Mountains, Ulytau Mountains
Result	Kazakh victory

Belligerents
Kazakh Khanate	Dzungar Khanate

Commanders and leaders
(Kazakh Khanate) Abul Khair Khan (Kazakh Khanate) Bogenbay Batyr	(Dzungar Khanate) Tsewang Rabtan Khan (Dzungar Khanate) Galdan Tseren Khan

Casualties and losses
Catastrophic	Unknown

The Kazakh–Dzungar War of 1723–1730 was the most significant conflict of the Kazakh–Dzungar Wars between the Kazakh Khanate and the invading Dzungar Khanate from 1723 to 1730.

This led a catastrophic civilian casualty among the Kazakhs, causing upon a forced displacement of the Kazakhs and indiscriminate attacks on civilians by the Dzungar army. The Kazakh Khanate were later able to defeat the Dzungars after two Ordabasy meetings in 1726 and 1728.

== Background ==
After the events of Dzungar campaigns against the Kazakhs from 1708 to 1718, the Dzungar attacks on Kazakhs ceased as the Dzungars now had to focus against the Qing dynasty, as a war over Tibet had started. The Dzungars were defeated by the Qing dynasty, allowing the Kazakhs to recapture their lost territories and sack the Dzungars by 1720. However, after death of Kangxi Emperor, the Dzungar Khan, Tsewang Rabtan Khan mobilized all his forces to the Kazakh Khanate. Amidst this, the Kazakhs faced a heavy winter, as they were preparing to migrate towards their pastures during the summer season and for various economic reasons. Soon the Dzungar commanders declared war upon the Kazakhs and started their invasion. As the Kazakhs did not expect the declaration of war.

== Course of the War ==
=== Dzungar invasion ===
Preparations for a large-scale invasion of Kazakhstan and Central Asia began in early spring 1723. The timing was well chosen: after a harsh and snowy winter, Kazakh auls were preparing to migrate to their summer pastures and were engaged in economic activities, including the castration of young livestock. The weakened animals moved with difficulty, which made the nomads particularly vulnerable. At the same time, Dzungar forces were redeployed from the eastern frontiers—where they had previously been engaged in hostilities against the Qing Empire—to the region of the Chu and Talas rivers. The Kazakh rulers did not expect an attack: the leaders of the Junior and Middle zhuzes were at that time preparing for a campaign against the Volga Kalmyks, while the senior khan Bolat also did not foresee the impending threat. According to historian A. Sh. Kadyrbayev, the strike was calculated in such a way as to destroy the most combat-ready force of the Kazakh militia at once, thereby avoiding a prolonged war. Those who refused to submit to the Dzungars were physically exterminated. “The same fate awaited all the remaining Kirghiz-Kaisaks [Kazakhs]

In 1723, shortly after the death of the Chinese emperor Kangxi and the temporary reconciliation between the Dzungar Khanate and the Qing Empire, the Dzungar khuntaiji Tsewang Rabtan sent more than 30,000 troops against the Kazakhs under the command of his son Shono-Lauzan. The sudden invasion caught the auls by surprise: the first to suffer were the Sadyr clans in the valleys of the Talas and Arys rivers, many of whom were killed or taken captive; attacks also struck other nomadic encampments and towns. Thousands of people were taken prisoner, and in the same year the Dzungars captured Turkestan, Tashkent, Sairam, and a number of other cities, which dealt a severe blow to the Kazakh ruling elite; the family of Khan Abulkhair was also taken captive.

Between 1723 and 1725 the Dzungars occupied Southern Kazakhstan and Semirechye, defeating the Kazakh militia. Most of the Senior and Middle zhuzes were defeated and became tributaries of Tsewang Rabtan.

The suddenness of the attack, the enemy’s numerical superiority on the main axes of advance, the presence of artillery, and the better military organization of the Dzungar Khanate—unified under a single command—ensured the Dzungars’ initial success. However, according to historian Sh. B. Chimitdorzhiev, it would be incorrect to regard surprise as the main reason for the Kazakhs’ defeat. Dzungaria was a centralized state with a relatively strong political and military organization and considerable military experience. The Kazakhs, by contrast, were at that time experiencing feudal fragmentation and internal conflicts, which explains the repeated defeats they suffered.

=== Peripheral events ===
Between 1723 and 1725, Uzbek territories including Khujand, Samarkand, and Andijan fell under Dzungar domination, and the Fergana Valley was subsequently captured. In addition to the Syr Darya cities, the cities of Khujand, Andijan, and Samarkand also came under Dzungar control.

According to contemporary accounts, joint actions by Kazakhs and the inhabitants of Tashkent against the Oirats took place in the early 1720s. The Central Asian historian Khojamkuli-bek Balkhi wrote that during the campaign of the Khuntaiji against Tashkent, Andijan, Sairam, and the coastal regions of the Syr Darya, “about three lakhs of Kazakhs together with the people of Tashkent fought from morning to evening for a month”. However, they were defeated and forced to retreat toward Samarkand, while Tashkent and Andijan agreed to pay kharaj. According to the same author, the Oirat feudal lords also defeated the Kyrgyz, forcing them to withdraw to the regions of Hisar-i Shadman and Khuttalan.

The arrival of Kazakhs in the Samarkand region complicated the internal political situation. The Central Asian historian Muhammad Amin reported that Rajab Khan, after several battles with Abulfeiz Khan, appealed for assistance to Kazakh nomads who had been driven from their pastures by the Dzungars. Responding to the request, they invaded Transoxiana and occupied the entire fertile Zarafshan Valley as far as the tumans of Bukhara.

The Karakalpaks also suffered heavy losses as a result of the Dzungar invasion of 1723–1725. They were forced to abandon the middle course of the Syr Darya, with some migrating to the upper reaches of the river near Tashkent, and others moving to the lower reaches, to the shores of the Aral Sea and further toward the Emba River and the Yaik. This migration long delayed the process of national consolidation of the Karakalpak people. During this period the Karakalpaks became divided into “Upper” and “Lower” groups: the former fell under the authority of Dzungar feudal lords, while the latter came under the rule of the leaders of the Senior and Middle zhuzes. According to the observations of T. A. Zhdanko, the consolidation of Dzungar control over the middle Syr Darya ultimately formalized this division and determined the divergence of their historical destinies.

In the same years, Dzungar forces also launched attacks against the Kyrgyz. According to the Extract on the Peoples, Rulers, and Cities of the Dzungars compiled by Captain I. Unkovsky, Khan Tsewang Rabtan subdued the “people called the Buruts”, who nomadized in the region of Issyk-Kul. Some Kyrgyz voluntarily recognized Dzungar authority by providing hostages (amanats), while others resisted. Dzungar detachments also advanced as far as the principalities of the Hindu Kush and the Pamir-Alay.

In late summer 1724, Abulkhair Khan captured Turkestan and Tashkent by a powerful assault, forcing the Dzungar commander Shono-Lauzan to retreat to the Karatau Mountains. Abulkhair held these cities for about a year; however, in early 1725 he was compelled to abandon them and withdraw due to the enemy’s numerical superiority. In the same year Abulkhair, having assembled a force of 50,000 men, fought the army of Tsewang Rabtan. After suffering defeat and losing about 10,000 warriors, he retreated. Subsequently, in the spring of 1725, Turkestan and Tashkent were once again captured by Dzungar forces. The Kazakhs found themselves completely cut off from the urban markets and craft centers of Central Asia. A direct consequence of this conquest was that a new powerful wave of Kazakh refugees flooded into the northwestern and northern regions of Kazakhstan.

During the invasion of 1723–1725, Russia refrained from intervening in the affairs of Kazakhstan and Central Asia, focusing instead on preventing possible raids by Kazakhs and Karakalpaks on territories under its authority inhabited by the Kalmyks and Bashkirs. Thus, on 12 December 1723, a decree was sent to Ayuka Khan of the Volga Kalmyks ordering him to assist local authorities in repelling the advance, since “the Kirghiz-Kaisaks and the Karakalpaks, having assembled forty thousand men, are marching in war against our Imperial Majesty’s towns and against your uluses to devastate villages and settlements”.

=== Humanitarian situation ===
These years entered the history of Kazakhstan as the “Years of the Great Disaster”. In terms of their destructive consequences for the Kazakhs, they are comparable only to the Mongol invasion of the 13th century: the Dzungar aggression sharply altered the international situation in Central Asia, while the approach of thousands of families to the borders of Central Asia and the domains of the Volga Kalmyks heightened tensions in the region. Many Kazakh clans fled from Southern Kazakhstan: the Senior zhuz and part of the Middle zhuz moved beyond Tashkent toward Khujand, into the regions of Karategin and the Fergana up to the Pamir; most of the Middle zhuz moved toward Samarkand; and the clans of the Junior zhuz fled to Khiva and Bukhara. This tragic flight was reflected in the well-known song “Yelim-ai” (“My Homeland”).

The economic life of Central Asia was paralyzed. The mass migration of Kazakhs into Central Asia caused by the Dzungar invasion led to severe socio-economic consequences for the region. Crowds of nomads—Kazakhs, Kyrgyz, and Karakalpaks—together with their herds devastated agricultural districts, trampled crops, and filled cities that were already densely populated. According to contemporary accounts, continuous raids brought devastation and famine to Transoxiana, reaching the point of cannibalism; many cities, including Samarkand, Khiva, and Bukhara, were depopulated for more than a decade, trade declined, money disappeared from circulation, and caravans were forced to seek alternative routes through Dzungaria. Some Kazakh refugees returned from Central Asia to the Aral Sea region, from where they migrated further north toward the Southern Ural and Western Siberia, which in turn set the Kalmyks in motion as they were forced to retreat toward the Volga. At the same time, some clans of the Junior and Middle zhuzes moved toward the Tobol, Or, Uy, and Ilek, where clashes with the Bashkirs began over pastures, accompanied by cattle raids and the capture of prisoners.

In the winter of 1725, alarming letters from Kalmyk taishas about the advance of many-thousand-strong Kazakh detachments toward the Emba began arriving at the Astrakhan chancery. The forced migrations of Kazakh clans of the Junior and Middle zhuzes in 1725–1726 were caused by pressure from the Dzungars and the loss of control over key cities of Central Asia. These migrations to the northwest led to a sharp escalation of the situation on the southern frontiers of the Russian Empire. The Kazakhs occupied the steppe spaces along the Yaik, Ilek, and Tobol, which caused numerous conflicts with Bashkirs, Kalmyks, and Yaik Cossacks over pastures and water sources. Reports by tsarist officials recorded armed clashes and raids that posed a threat to the frontier regions. The worsening situation caused serious concern in Saint Petersburg. In December 1725, the issue was discussed at a meeting of the Supreme Privy Council under Empress Catherine I.

The new wave of Kazakhs arriving in the Urals was so large that it threatened the existence of the Kalmyk Khanate, as evidenced by requests for military assistance to protect summer pastures along the Volga. With the assistance of Russian troops, the Kalmyks managed to retain their nomadic territories between the Volga and the Urals.

=== Organization of resistance ===
Speech of Bogenbay Batyr

“Weak souls… revealed their fear… proposing to seek safety in the mercy of the khuntaiji (the Dzungar ruler). Others wished to abandon their homes and seek refuge beyond the Volga River, while some, like hares, wanted to scatter in different directions and nearly shook the resolve of many; but Bukenbay, renowned at that time for his bravery, put an end to these intentions.” He called upon them “to exert every effort in the unanimous defense of one another to the last drop of blood.”

A. I. Tevkelev noted that during this period the Kazakhs were “defeated, scattered, and devastated.”. However, having recovered from the first defeats, the Kazakhs began to gather their forces. At the beginning of 1726, individual detachments of batyrs (Note: Bogenbay, Tailak, Janybek, Malay-Sa, Utegen, and others) acted without coordination.

The enormous upheavals caused by the Dzungar invasion, as well as the mass loss of livestock—the principal wealth of the nomads—intensified the economic crisis and aggravated internal contradictions among the ruling elites of the Kazakh zhuzes. The only way out of the situation was an organized resistance to the enemy, capable of halting the economic and political disintegration of the Kazakh zhuzes.

At the initial stage of the liberation struggle against the Dzungar Khanate, the Kazakh Chinggisids proved unable to organize resistance independently. As a result, the leading role in the struggle for independence was assumed by representatives of the military nobility of Kazakh society, the so-called “black bone” — the batyrs, which marked the beginning of coordinated actions by popular militias. According to historical sources, the Kazakhs attempted to organize resistance against the Dzungars as early as 1724. Evidence of this appears in a report by Florio Beneveni received in Moscow on 15 January 1725: “Shono-Lauzan, through war with Abulkhair Khan, captured the city of Turkestan and 32 uluses; but afterwards Abulkhair Khan, having united with the Kazakhs, returned by war to Turkestan and holds it again in his possession to this day.”.

V. Bakunin wrote in a letter dated 9 February 1725 that four Kazakh detachments conducted raids against the Kalmyks, Dzungars, Bashkirs, and Uzbeks, but were defeated in all campaigns. This letter also indicates that one of the reasons for the Kazakhs’ military failures was the dispersion of their forces at a time when concentration was required to confront their most dangerous opponent — the Dzungar Khanate. Another source reports: “The Karakalpak and Kaisak Abulkhair Khan, having gathered fifty thousand troops, fought the khuntaiji, and the khuntaiji devastated ten thousand of their kibitkas; the remaining forty thousand kibitkas are said to be moving here to seize the Kalmyk forces, and they are now on the Emba River.”.

In 1726 the organized resistance of the Kazakhs against the Dzungar Khanate began. That year, in the locality of Orda-Bas (Orda-Basy) near Turkestan, the assembly of representatives of the Kazakh zhuzes was held, where it was decided to organize a popular militia. The ruler of the Junior zhuz, Abulkhair Khan, was elected as the leader and commander of the militia. According to the description of Alexey Levshin, “danger reconciled internal strife, produced general agreement, and directed everyone toward a single goal.”. As a sign of loyalty, a customary oath was sworn and a white horse was sacrificed.

=== Kazakh Offensive ===
Kazakh historian Irina Yerofeyeva writes that between 1727 and 1730, a united Kazakh militia secured a series of victories over the Dzungars in both major and minor engagements. However, no documentary evidence of these clashes has survived; information about them has reached us solely through Kazakh oral traditions, which were recorded and published by researchers in the 19th and 20th centuries—such as A. I. Levshin, A. A. Divayev, and M. Tynyshpayev. Consequently, the dating and specific circumstances of individual battles remain approximate and may be refined in the future.

In 1727, the coalition military forces of the three zhuzes, under the command of Abulkhair Khan, launched a decisive offensive against the Dzungar troops. West of the Sarysu River, on the banks of the Bulanty and Belyuty rivers, in the Kara-siyr area of the southeastern Turgay steppe (Note: Modern Ulytau District, Karaganda Region), a major battle took place between the Dzungar forces and the Kazakh militia, in which the Kazakh forces were victorious. This location later became known as “Kalmāk Kyrilgan”—the “Place of the Dzungars’ Death.” The success of the Kazakhs was also aided by political instability in Dzungaria, which began after the death of the ruler Tsevan Rabdan in 1727 and the subsequent struggle for the throne among his successors.

Although the Kazakhs achieved their first major victory over the forces of the Dzungar Khanate, the task of liberating Kazakh lands in the south and east remained unresolved. According to historian I. V. Erofeeva, despite the initial successes of the Kazakh militia in the war against the Dzungar Khanate, Abulkhair Khan and other Kazakh commanders were unable to develop a large-scale offensive on the Southeast front the following year, as they soon became deeply involved in Central Asian affairs after the battle near the Belyuty River. Recalling the events of 6 October 1731 at his summer camp on the Irgiz River, Abulkhair told A. I. Tevkelev that, “not content with” the long-standing “war with the kontaysha”, he “began to wage war… also with Bukhara… However, now we have reconciled with Bukhara and Khiva.” Documentary materials from the 1720s–30s provide almost no details of the Kazakh khan’s military actions in Central Asia, so the actual course of these events can only be reconstructed approximately, based primarily on indirect evidence.

On 6 November 1728, the Khan of the Middle Zhuz, Semeke, sent an embassy to the Volga Kalmyks for peace negotiations to secure his western flank and allow the Kazakhs to concentrate all their forces against the Dzungar Khanate.

At the kurultai, which according to Kadyrbaev took place after 1728, Abulkhair, the Khan of the Junior Zhuz, was elected as the commander-in-chief of the united Kazakh militia. Around 120 kilometers from Lake Balkhash, in the Angrakay area, the last major battle between the Kazakh militia and the Dzungar Khanate took place. (Note: Based on a comparative analysis of Kazakh toponymy and historical traditions conducted by M. T. Tynyshpaev, the main directions of the Kazakh forces’ attacks against the Dzungars were as follows: units of the Senior Zhuz crossed the Keles-Badam range west of Mount Kazykurt, the Middle Zhuz advanced north of this area, and the Junior Zhuz moved along the western slopes of the Karatau Mountains.)

According to Tynyshpaev, during this offensive Kazakh warriors repeatedly struck the enemy forces. Large military detachments were commanded by sultans Abulmambet, Barak, Abilay, Abulkhair, and other Chinggisids. Alongside them, significant contributions to the general struggle against Dzungar aggression were made by representatives of the “black bone”, such as the batyrs Bogenbay and Yeset from the Zhetyru generation of the Junior Zhuz, Bogenbay of the Kanjigaly clan and his namesake from the Shakshak clan of the Argyn tribe of the Middle Zhuz, as well as the batyrs Kabanbay, Zhanibek, Otegen, Tailak, Sauryk, Malaysary, and many others. According to Moiseev, the Anrakay Battle took place in 1729, while Kadyrbaev estimates either 1729 or spring 1730.

In 1729, M. Etygerov arrived at the camp of the khontayji. Galdan-Tseren showed no interest in the demands of the Siberian administration but instead persistently inquired: “Are they not moving against the Kazakhs from your side?”, preparing the ground for a joint campaign against the Kazakhs. However, the Siberian administration categorically refused this idea. In response to Kazakh raids, the Dzungar forces carried out plundering raids on Kazakh nomadic settlements.

== Results ==
Between 1727 and 1730, the Kazakhs decisively defeated the Oirat armies of Galdan-Tseren. However, internal political disputes prevented the Kazakhs from leveraging these victories to reclaim the lost pastures in Semirechye and in the territory of present-day East Kazakhstan. These victories largely predetermined the successful outcome of the eight-year Kazakh-Oirat war and contributed to the growing authority of Abulkhair Khan as the supreme commander among the Kazakh population of the three zhuzes. (Note: He is credited with playing a key role in preventing the subjugation of Kazakh lands to the Dzungar Khanate and their potential division among neighboring states. His memory as the supreme commander of the coalition of the three zhuzes is reflected in a number of toponyms in the Chu-Ili and Sarysu regions associated with his name. Moreover, during this period, Abulkhair Khan received the title ghazi (“victor over the infidels”) in the Muslim world of Central Asia, becoming the second after Khan Tauke and the last in the history of the Kazakh Steppe to hold this honorary title.).

Following these defeats, the Dzungars were forced to retreat eastward into the core territory of the Dzungar Khanate. Soon after this battle, a power struggle emerged among Abulmambet, Semeke, and Abulkhair over the position of the supreme Khan of the Kazakhs. Ultimately, this resulted in the units of the Junior and Middle zhuzes being compelled to withdraw from the theater of operations.

However, Kazakh historian I. V. Erofeeva presents a different interpretation. According to her, in the spring of 1730, after the victory over the Dzungars at the Anyrakay tract, Abulkhair Khan received news of an incursion by armed detachments of Bashkir batyrs into the northern pastures of the Junior and Middle zhuzes. Consequently, no later than early May 1730, he concluded a peace treaty with the Dzungar khuntayji Galdan-Tseren and, together with Khan Semeke, hastily moved northward.

After the Dzungar-Kazakh war of 1723–1729, the borders of the Kazakh zhuzes were revised, both internally and externally, and relations with Russia intensified. Moreover, albeit briefly, the Kazakhs managed to unify, as evidenced by the formation of a sizable militia drawn from warriors of all three zhuzes under the command of Khan Abulkhair. Additionally, the military campaigns strengthened statehood within the Kazakh zhuzes and reinforced centripetal tendencies within Kazakh society.

=== Aftermath ===
In 1730, the Khan of the Junior jüz, Abul Khair Khan, had sent a letter to Anna of Russia, the Empress of Russian Empire to incorporate the Junior Jüz. Empress Anna of Russia would accept this request, and soon after a Russian convoy was sent to inform the jJüz. The convoy met with the Kazakhs on 10 October 1731, and officially incorporate the region into the Russian Empire. Later on December 15, 1731, Sameke Khan submitted to the Russian Empire, as the Middle Jüz was officially incorporated.

Later, another conflict started between the Dzungars and the Kazakhs, as the Kazakhs led raids and repelled invasions by the Dzungars. Meanwhile, the Dzungars attempted to subjugate the Middle Jüz but were able to invade Syr Darya and subjugate the Senior Jüz.
