= Barefooted Flight =

18th-century expulsion of Kazakhs from parts of southern Kazakhstan

Years of Great Disasters
- Part of the Kazakh–Dzungar War (1723–1730) of Kazakh–Dzungar Wars
- Native name: Kazakh: «Ақтабан шұбырынды, Алқакөл сұлама»
- Location: Jetisu, Southern Kazakhstan, Syr Darya, Fergana Valley, Irtysh, Chu River, Talas River, Kazakhstan
- Date: 1723
- Target: Kazakh civilians
- Attack type: Indiscriminate attack on civilian populations and Forced displacement.
- Deaths: Unknown, catastrophic
- Victim: Kazakh civilians
- Perpetrator: Dzungar Khanate
- Motive: Territorial Expansion

The Barefooted Flight or also known as the Years of Great Disasters (Kazakh: «Ақтабан шұбырынды, Алқакөл сұлама») is a name given to the defeat, indiscriminate attacks on civilians and expulsion of the Kazakhs from Kazakhstan from 1723 to 1725/1727. The expulsion and the indiscriminate attacks on civilians included the Senior Jüz, Middle Jüz and the Junior Jüz, as the Kyrgyz and Karakalpaks. As it was described as the "worst case of nomadic-sedentary relations: steppe pastoralists ravaged the cultivated land of sedentary neighbours".

== Background ==
The death of Tauke Khan in 1718 left the Kazakhs without a recognized leader and plunged them into a succession crisis. Following this, the Kazakhs faced internal rivalries and disputes, while the Dzungar ruler Tsewang Rabtan mobilized his forces for an invasion with the following death of the Kangxi Emperor in 1722, which he had fought against in the Second Dzungar-Qing War. The end of war against the Qing dynasty allowed Tsewang to focus on Kazakhstan, which he made a sudden invasion against them.

== The Barefooted Flight ==
Tsewang Rabtan and his commanders, such as Lobsangsür invaded the upper reach of the Irtysh river, and attacked the nomadic camps of the Jüz, specifically, the Middle Jüz and the Senior Jüz on 1723. Another major Dzungar army attacked to the Chu, Nura, Shelek and Talas rivers, Balkash Steppe—as they swiftly occupied the regions. This allowed for the invasion of Jetisu and Southern Kazakhstan and sacking their territory. Afterwards, a Kazakh militia fought the Dzungars, in which the Kazakhs were expulsed, a Kazakh militia led by an unknown batyr battled the Dzungar army led by Lobsangsür at the city of Sayram and the Kazakhs were defeated again on Tashkent. This led to its capture and plunder by the Dzungars. The Kazakhs retreated to Khara Murut, where they, again, suffered defeat; the Dzungars sacked the city, following this, they went deep on the Syr Darya, defeating the Kazakhs at Turkistan. The Dzungars then swept through the Fergana Valley, which the Dzungars captured Khujand, Andijan and Samarkand. They later captured more cities throughout the rivers of Chirchiq, Arys and Borolday, consolidating their occupation.

== Casualties ==
The question of the scale of Kazakh losses during the Great Disaster remains disputed. There are several views regarding the number of casualties. According to Russian historian Alexander Kadyrbaev, the Dzungar invasion of Central Asia in 1720s had devastating consequences for both nomadic and settled populations. Most people lost their material resources, while refugees were forced to leave their homes and died of starvation. In particular, the historian estimates that approximately one-third of the Kazakh population died during this period.

According to one estimate, up to two-thirds of the entire Kazakh population died during this period. According to Khojamquli-bek Balkhi, of approximately 300,000 Kazakhs, around 100,000 died, while more than 150,000 Kazakh households were forced to migrate towards Samarkand. However, Russian sources do not record such a sharp decline in the Kazakh population, mentioning only the capture of approximately 5,000 Kazakh families. Kazakh historian Zhaxylyk Sabitov considers these estimates of losses to be greatly exaggerated. While acknowledging the significant scale of the human losses, the researcher concludes that a proportion closer to one-third of the population is more plausible. At the same time, the historian notes that the Kazakhs were able to restore their population relatively quickly. In the subsequent period, Bukenbai Batyr estimated the number of Kazakhs at "80,000 troops", which was comparable to the figures from the era of Tauke Khan. In a 1726 message, Koibaghar Kobyakov recorded that the total number of Kazakhs amounted to up to 100,000 warriors.

== In national history ==
The Kazakh political activist and historian Mukhamedzhan Tynyshpaev wrote several works which described the Flight. His narrative of the events would later form the basis of Soviet-era and Post-Soviet histories of the event.

== See also ==
- Dzungar genocide
- Kazakh–Dzungar Wars
