= Tynyshbaev (surname) =

Tynyshbaev (Kazakh: Тынышбаев), russfied as Tynyshpaev (Russian: Тынышпаев) is a Kazakh surname. The name derives from male given name Tynyshbai which means "quiet rich man" and is literally translated as Tynyshbai's. The surname in feminine is written as Tynyshbaeva.

Notable people with the surname include:

- Mukhamedzhan Tynyshpaev (1879–?), Kazakh engineer, activist, and intellectual
