= Mustafa Shokay =

Kazakh politician of the Turkestan Autonomy (1890–1941)

- مصطفی چوقای; Мұстафа Шоқай
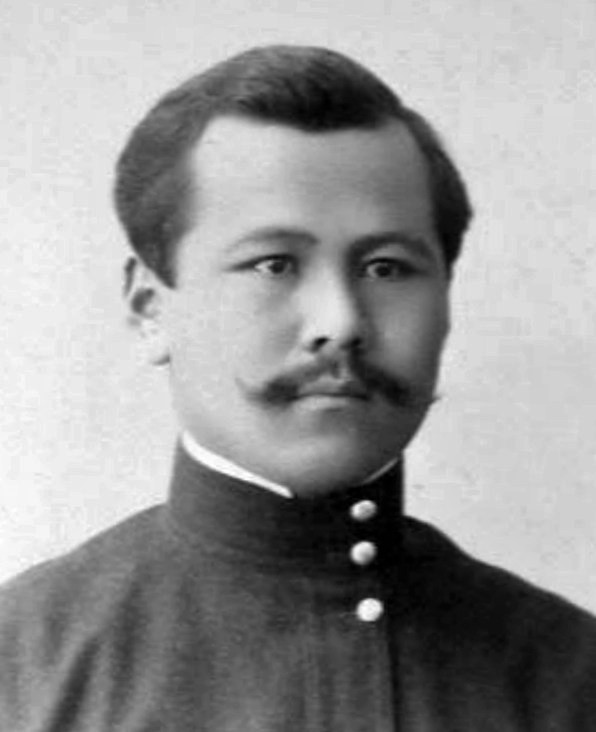
- Shokay in 1910

Minister-President of the Turkestan Autonomy
- In office 12 December 1917 – 19 February 1918
- Preceded by: Mukhamedzhan Tynyshpaev
- Succeeded by: Kichik Ergash

Minister of Foreign Affairs of Turkestan Autonomy
- In office 28 November 1917 – 19 February 1918
- Preceded by: Position established
- Succeeded by: Position abolished

Personal details
- Born: 25 December 1890 Akmeshit, Russian Empire (now Kyzylorda, Kazakhstan)
- Died: 27 December 1941 (aged 51) Berlin, Nazi Germany
- Party: Alash Party
- Spouse: Maria Shokay
- Education: Saint Petersburg State University
- Profession: Lawyer; Politician

Mustafa bek Shokay (Note: Kazakh: Мұстафа бек Шоқайұлы, romanized: Mūstafa bek Şoqaiūly.; Chagatay: مصطفی بیک چوقای اوغلی, romanized: Muṣṭäfā bek Çoqayoġlï.; Russian: Мустафа-бек Шокай-оглы, romanized: Mustafa-bek Shokay-ogly. The last name also appears in the forms Чокай-оглы, Chokay-ogly, Чокаев, Chokayev, Шокаев, Shokayev, Чокай, Chokay, and Шокай, Shokay.) (25 December 1890 – 27 December 1941) was a Kazakh social and political activist and ideologue of Turkestan nationalism. From 1921, he lived in exile in France.

== Early life ==
Mustafa Shokay was born into a Muslim Kazakh family of aristocrats in the Kazakh town of Ak-Meshit (modern Kyzylorda, Kazakhstan). During this period, the status of one's family was evaluated by the number of cattle they possessed, meaning that Mustafa's family was wealthy in their village due to the high number of cattle in their possession. Mustafa's paternal grandfather was the Datkha, which in Persian means – "a wish, request, Justice". The Datkha was equal to a Sultan and was higher in title than the Bey. Mustafa's grandfather was elected as Prime Minister – Datkha of Khiva's khan. The Datkha was subordinate only to the Khan and was often tasked with helping him manage the Khanate. The mother of Mustafa was Bakty, an intellectual in her own right and a descendant of the famous Batu Khan. Bakty was well-educated, in Kazakh, Arabic, and Persian. Mustafa and his family were from the Middle Juz (horde) of the Kypchak’s tribe, Torgai clan, Shashty popliteal, Boshay knee, Janay popliteal.

Before the October Revolution in 1917 Shokay's Family and about 30 of his relatives lived in one village, which was located 5 kilometers from the station of Sulu-Tube. They lived in nice yurts, (nomad's houses). Mustafa's father had 2 wives, with Bakty being his second one. Bakty gave birth to two sisters and three brothers in addition to him. Most of the other children in the Shokay family are undocumented, but sources do mention that Mustafa had an older brother named Nurtaza. Mustafa was the youngest child in their family and was 15 years younger than his Sadyk brothers.

Mustafa's mother taught her children to read and write in childhood, helping them learn Kazakh, Arabic, and Persian just as she did. When he was 5 years old, Mustafa learned to play on the dombra. From childhood he was musically gifted, and had a great ear for music. In their village was a local mullah, who taught him to read the Quran and assisted Mustafa in understanding the Islamic Holy Book. Mustafa set himself apart from other students by perfectly memorizing all of the sura from the Quran by heart.

At the age of 7, Mustafa's father took him to the urbanized part of Ak-Meshit, where he would study in a Russian school and slowly assimilate into Russian society. While his father was in favor of him receiving a higher education and at least partially assimilating, Mustafa's mother feared that he would forget his Muslim Kazakh roots and forever be Russianized. Moreover, the mullah of Ak-Meshit added to all of this by claiming that the Russians would crucify him should Mustafa refuse to give up Islam. Mustafa was initially hesitant to go to the Russian school, but his father was able to effectively persuade him into furthering his education there.

Mustafa started his education in the Russian school, but he became very sick and soon left his studies. In 1902 he was admitted to a Tashkent gymnasium and in 1910 he graduated with the school's gold medal. General Samsonov (Alexander Samsonov (1859–1914), a Russian military commander during World War I) was against Mustafa receiving the gold medal and insisted that an ethnic Russian student should win. The gold was then handed to Zeprometov, a Russian student in the program. However, the director of the Tashkent gymnasium disagreed and even Zeprometov himself said that Shokay should have gotten the gold medal. After a brief conflict, the medal was given back to Mustafa.

The intentions of Samsonov caused outrage not only within the ranks of the local youth, but also from the Russians. All of the professors and Russian intellectuals were ready to strike. That strike was provoked by the administration, as a result of the unfair treatment of students in favor of officials. Trying to smooth over the scandal, Samsonov approached Mustafa with a proposal to become an interpreter in his administration, but he refused Samsonov's request and went to St. Petersburg to enter the university's law faculty (1910–1917).

In 1912 Mustafa's father died and the local villagers asked him to return home at the request of his family to replace the post of his father – a judge. This event caused Mustafa to once again put his education on hold. He returned to complete the final stage of his education one year later in St. Petersburg. Towards the end of his education, the Stolypin agrarian reform in Kazakhstan occurred, and many Kazakhs were resettled as peasants by the Russian imperial administration. Mustafa moved back to Ak-Meshit, where his family remained as one of the few who did not suffer any dramatic effects of the Stolypin agrarian reform.

== Activities in St. Petersburg ==
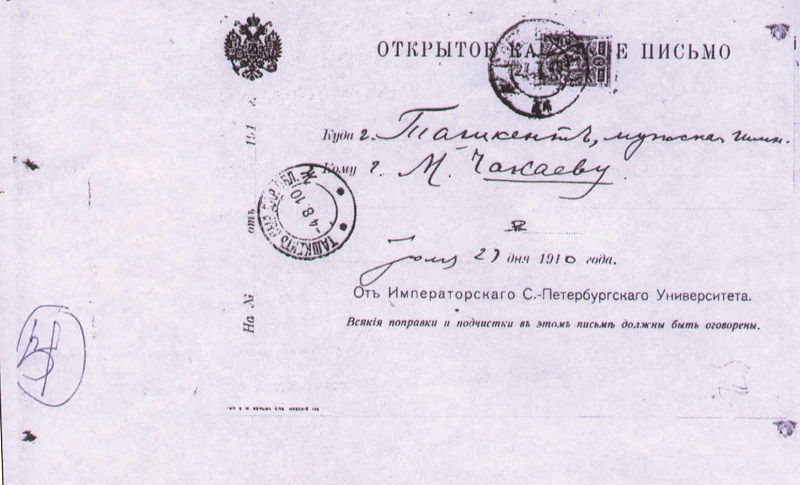
Document from St. Petersburg Imperial University on the admission of Mustafa Shokay to the university's faculty of law

During study in St. Petersburg, Mustafa was trying to protect not only the interest of his countryman, but the whole Kazakh nation. However, on 3 July 1907, Tsar Nikolai II issued a decree depriving the indigenous peoples of Siberia and Central Asia of their electoral rights, meaning they ended up with little representation in the State Duma of Russia. However, the Kazakh politicians and intellectuals continued to fight for the interests of the people. Working in the Duma, Shokai met with prominent Muslim political leaders of Russia and became friends with Ahmad Zeki Velidi, the future chairman of the Bashkir autonomy.

In the midst of heavy fighting during the First World War, on 25 June 1916, Tsar Nicholas II issued a decree "On the requisition of foreigners", attracting the indigenous population of Turkestan and the steppe region in age from 19 to 43 years to rear work – digging trenches, despite the fact that the Muslims were exempted from military service due to the deprivation of electoral rights. The decree came in the days of Ramadan and the height of the agricultural work, and caused widespread outrage among Kazakhs. A powerful uprising, led by Amankeldı İmanov, began in Turgay Oblast and soon spread throughout Kazakhstan.

There were protests against the decree in the State Duma. Shokay entered his commission as a secretary and translator of the Muslim faction. Subsequent performances of Kerensky in the Duma, who provided his analysis of the Turkestan uprising against the imperial government policies, brought him huge popularity throughout Russia. When he returned to Petrograd, Shokay prepared materials for his faction's speeches in the State Duma. However the State Duma was dissolved by Tsar Nicholas II, who then abdicated.

== Personality ==
Shokay was a practicing Muslim. During his education and subsequent career, he did not join a specific political party, identifying instead as a democrat. His political activities focused on the independence and future of his nation, and he was noted for his advocacy of peaceful political solutions. Shokay served as a member of the State Duma.

Shokay admired and highly valued Mustafa Kemal, a Turkish nationalist and the founder of the modern-day Republic of Turkey. Shokay considered that Turkestan needed a political reformer like Atatürk. Mustafa Shokay did not hold any hostile emotions toward bigots or to representatives of other nations. He loved to have discussions or argue with people who possessed different political opinions than him. In arguments he was calm and always respected his opponent's standpoint. He always took any inhumane acts to his heart. He was able to find the way to the heart of the people through his honesty and ability to empathize with others. Sometimes he became heated, defending his position, but always refrained from personal attacks. Mustafa opposed narrow-minded nationalism. He defended his position of establishing a union of Turkestan's people. However, despite the Russian nationalists recognition Mustafa's position, they refused to act in the interests of Turkestan's people or other non-Russian nations. These principles of Russian democracy alienated Mustafa Shokay, leading to him severing all ties with the Russian periodical press in 1923 (mass-media).

== Political career ==
In 1914 World War I began and Mustafa as a student, became a member of State Duma as a secretary. Mustafa was introduced to the Muslim fraction on the recommendation of Alikhan Bukeikhanov. Until 1917, before the October Revolution, Mustafa was a member of the State Duma where he represented the Turko-Tatar peoples. His formal political activities began in 1917 when Mustafa Shokay was delegated to the congress of Muslims in Moscow, where a large congress on Turkestan was held on his initiative. Mustafa was a member of the Turkestan committee of the Provisional Government and later he was elected as a chairman of Turkestan's national committee.

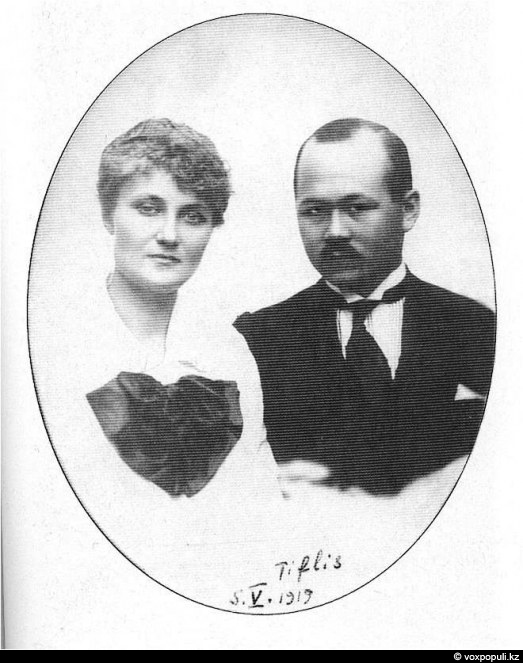
Mustafa Shokay while in exile in Tbilisi with his wife Maria Gorina, May 1919

On 10 December 1917 the project of creating autonomy was submitted. On the 4th Congress in Turkestan, Turkestan autonomy, known as the Kokand Autonomy was founded. After the end of the Russian Provisional Government was declared in Petrograd during the armed uprising on 25 October, the Bolsheviks decided to hold elections to the Constituent Assembly of Russia. However, in the November 1917 election the Bolsheviks received only 23.9% of the vote against 40.4% for the Right Socialist-Revolutionaries.

In such circumstances, on 20 March 1918 the Kokand government announced its intention to create a parliament with universal direct, equal and secret elecrions. Two thirds of the seats in parliament were reserved for Muslim MPs and one third for representatives of non-Muslims. The existence of such a parliament was to be the first step towards the democratization of Turkestan. But Chairman of People's Commissars of the Turkestan Republic Fedor Kolesov, said:

"We can not allow Muslims to the supreme authorities, since the position of the local population against us is not defined and, in addition, they have no proletarian organization"[6]

So on 11 February 1918 the Bolsheviks sent troops to Kokand. Kokand was completely destroyed, as the Bolshevik troops were armed with machine guns and cannons, which were not available in Kokand, Turkestan. Shokay fled through Fergana to Tashkent. A bounty of 1000 rubbles was placed on his head. At that time Mustafa Shokay was the youngest politician, who advocated for the Turkestan Autonomy, but he was against separatism. When he was in hiding, Mustafa met his old friend Maria Gorina, whom he married in April 1918, After this event Shokay said:” We called the Soviet power then established in Tashkent the «enemy of our people». I have not changed my view on the matter in the last ten years.” During the following years Shokay wrote and published a book: ”Turkestan under the Soviet Union (On the characteristics of the dictatorship of the proletariat)”.

== Emigration ==
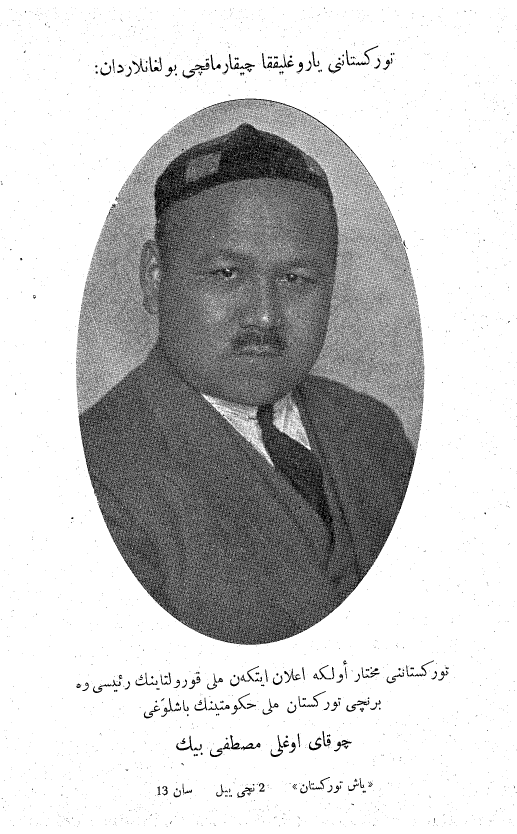
Portrait photograph of Mustafa Shokay from December 1930, published in the Yash Turkistan magazine

Traveling through the Kazakh steppe and the Caspian Sea, Mustafa Shokay managed to arrive safely in Baku, Azerbaijan, then Tbilisi, Georgia where he lived with his wife of two years, from spring 1919 till February 1921. Shokay then moved to Turkey, because the Red Army led by Sergo Ordzhonikidze, has defeated the Volunteer Army of General Denikin ans captured the North Caucasus, then Azerbaijan, Armenia, and on 16 February 1921 arrived Tiflis. The democratic Republic of Transcaucasia was overthrown by the Soviet Union. After the events in Transcaucasia Mustafa Shokay and his wife Maria Shokay emigrated to Istanbul, Turkey. Shokay in Istanbul wrote articles in English for “The Times” and for publications like “Şafak”, as well as for “Yeni Dünya”- “New World”. Then he found that Alexander Kerensky had also emigrated to Paris from Russia. Kerensky helped Shokay to get a French visa and in the summer of 1921 Mustafa and Maria moved to Paris, where he wrote articles for the newspaper of Kerensky “Days” and Milyukova's “Last News”. In 1923 Mustafa and Maria Shokay moved to Nogent-sur-Marne, where he spoke to the European public on "The policy of Russia and Turkestan National Movement".This period was a dark time for Mustafa and Maria Shokay. Mustafa Shokay was trying to write books, newspapers, magazines; held meetings and speech to make the world aware of the problems in Turkestan and Central Asia. These works were published in Istanbul, Paris, Berlin, London, Warsaw, and covered Central Asia, theoretical studies, history and politics. Mustafa Shokay created a newspaper in Istanbul: Yash Turkistan in 1927 which existed until 1931. In 1929 he settled in Berlin, where he became editor-in-chief of the local edition of the magazine "Yash (Young) Turkestan". The magazine lasted until the outbreak of World War II in 1939, releasing 117 editions. Mustafa Shokay spoke foreign languages such as English, French, Russian, German, Turkish, and Arabic.

== Unsuccessful collaboration with Nazi Germany ==
On the day of Operation Barbarossa, the attack of the Axis powers on the Soviet Union on 22 June 1941, the German occupying troops in Paris arrested all the well-known emigrants from the territories of the Soviet Union and imprisoned them in the castle of Compiègne (Château de Compiègne), including Shokay.

After three weeks, Shokay was taken to Berlin and after two weeks offered to lead the Turkestan Legion. This unit was meant to include Soviet military prisoners of Turkic descent held in German prisoner of war camps. The Nazis hoped they would benefit from Mustafa Shokay's authority. However, the Legion had been partially replenished by elite German troops which had combat experience against Soviet troops on the Eastern Front, while Shokay was required to familiarize Turkic prisoners with circumstances of their fellow countrymen in the camps. He was shocked by the inhuman conditions of Asians kept behind barbed wire.

Detailing the journey of Mustafa's life, he entertained the possibility of creating a union of Muslim states with the help of Germany. To achieve this goal, it would be necessary to organize Muslim-Soviet prisoners of war in order to overthrow Soviet governments in Kazakhstan and Central Asia. Mustafa Shokay agreed to become the head of this movement. The collaboration made known to the ideological leader of the National Socialist party on matters of ideology and foreign policy, the Minister for the "Eastern Territories" General SS Alfred Rosenberg.

In order to give some relief and grasping the chance to save prisoners' lives, Mustafa Shokay compromised with the German authorities. He set his conditions:

1. Create staff for the future of Turkestan state schools in Germany;
2. Create military forces from fellow prisoners, which would be used only when approaching the borders of Turkestan.

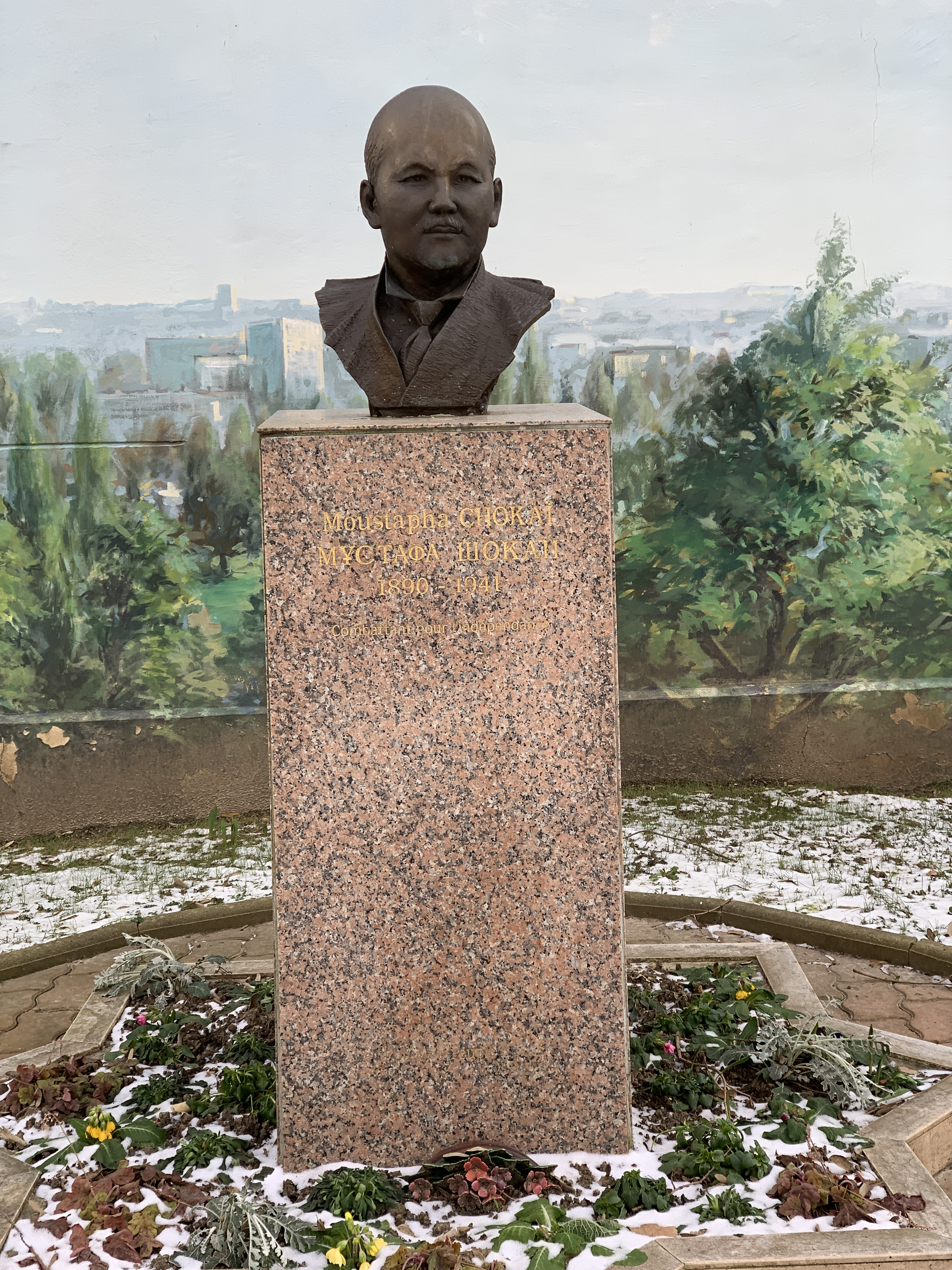
Monument to Mustafa Shokay in Nogent-sur-Marne, France

Mustafa Shokay wanted to receive some benefit from the collaboration with the Nazis. Unfortunately Adolf Hitler declined all his queries, because Hitler considered the Turkestan Legion as “cannon fodder”. Later Shokay wrote a letter to the Ministry of Foreign Affairs Gruppenführer Joachim von Ribbentrop: “Seeing how representatives of the nation, who raised such geniuses as Goethe, Feuerbach, Bach, Beethoven, Schopenhauer, treat prisoners of war ... I can not accept the offer to lead the ... Turkestan Legion and refuse further cooperation. All the consequences of my decision, I realize.” When Adolf Hitler realized his attempted manipulation of Mustafa Shokay was going to fail, the German leadership decided to remove him. On 22 December 1941, Hitler signed a decree for the establishment of the Turkestan and other national legions. At that time Mustafa was in hospital in Berlin, where he died on 27 December 1941, he died. The official report stated that he "died of blood poisoning on the background of an emerging epidemic of typhus," having become infected when visiting concentration camps. But the same symptoms could be poisoning. Moreover, in the memoirs of his wife Maria Gorina-Shokay, she wrote that Mustafa had been ill with typhus in Turkestan and he was supposed to be immune. Mustafa Shokai was buried in the Turkish Muslim cemetery (Osmanidov) in Berlin. On the tombstone just below the date at the behest of his wife M. Shokay, Maria Jakovlevna, there are three letters in Latin and four numbers: JOH.15.13. They point to the thirteenth verse of the fifteenth chapter of the Gospel of John: "There is no greater love than this; that a man lay down his life for his friends."

Leadership of the Turkestan Legion was later granted to Nazi-loyalist Vali Qayyum, a long standing collaborator of the anti-Soviet Prometheist movement. He was honorifically titled Khan after stating he had no problem embracing the Nazi vision to build a Turkic-Muslim army which would fight the Soviets.

== Selected works ==
- Mustafa Shokay. «Chez les Soviets en Asie Centrale», Paris, 1928.
- Mustafa Shokay. «The Basmati Movement in Turkestan», «The Asiatic Review», vol. XXIV, 1928.
- Mustafa Shokay -oghly: «Туркестан под властью советов», Paris, 1935.
- Mustafa Shokay. «Избранное» (в 2-х томах), Алматы, Кайнар, 1998.
- Mustafa Shokay. “Revolution in Turkestan, February's era” 2001.
- Mustafa Shokay. ”New Turkestan”, Istanbul, 1927.
- Mustafa Shokay "Yash (Young) Turkestan", Berlin, 1929 was released 117 editions.

Mustafa Shokay was fluent in English, French, Russian, German, Turkish, and Arabic.

== Memory ==
- 2000 – In Kazakhstan, a documentary book published Amirhana Bakirova "Operation" France "," Kyzyl-Orda, 2000.
- 2001 – Kazakhstan has translated and published the memoirs of Maria Shokay: "I am writing to you from Nozhan" (Memoirs, Letters, Documents, 1958), Almaty, "Kynar"
- 2001 – In the Nogent-sur-Marne, in the park at the La Fontaine house number 7, where he lived 18 years, Mustafa Shokai, a monument-stele
- 2003 – At the "Kazakhfilm" came dock. Film "Zar, or excommunication from the Motherland" (dir. – Makhmetova C. and O. Rymzhanov, the scenario B. Sadykova).
- 2006 – His name streets in Kzylorda and Almaty.
- 2007 – Magazine "Continent" (Almaty) has published an article B. Sadykova "In Memory of Turkestan Jadid (Mustafa Chokai)"
- 2008 – In the Paris suburb of Nogent-sur-Marne memorial plaque in memory of Shokai
- 2008 – Went film "Mustafa Shokai", dir. S. Narymbetov, "Kazakhfilm" in Sec. Starring Aziz Beishenaliev and Karina Abdullina
- 2011 – Went document. film "Дорогами Мустафы Шокая" (directed by K. Begmanov)
