= Turkestan Autonomy =

Former state in Central Asia

Turkestan Autonomy Turkiston Muxtoriyati (Uzbek)
- 1917–1918
- Flag
- Anthem: Hymn of the Turkestan Autonomy
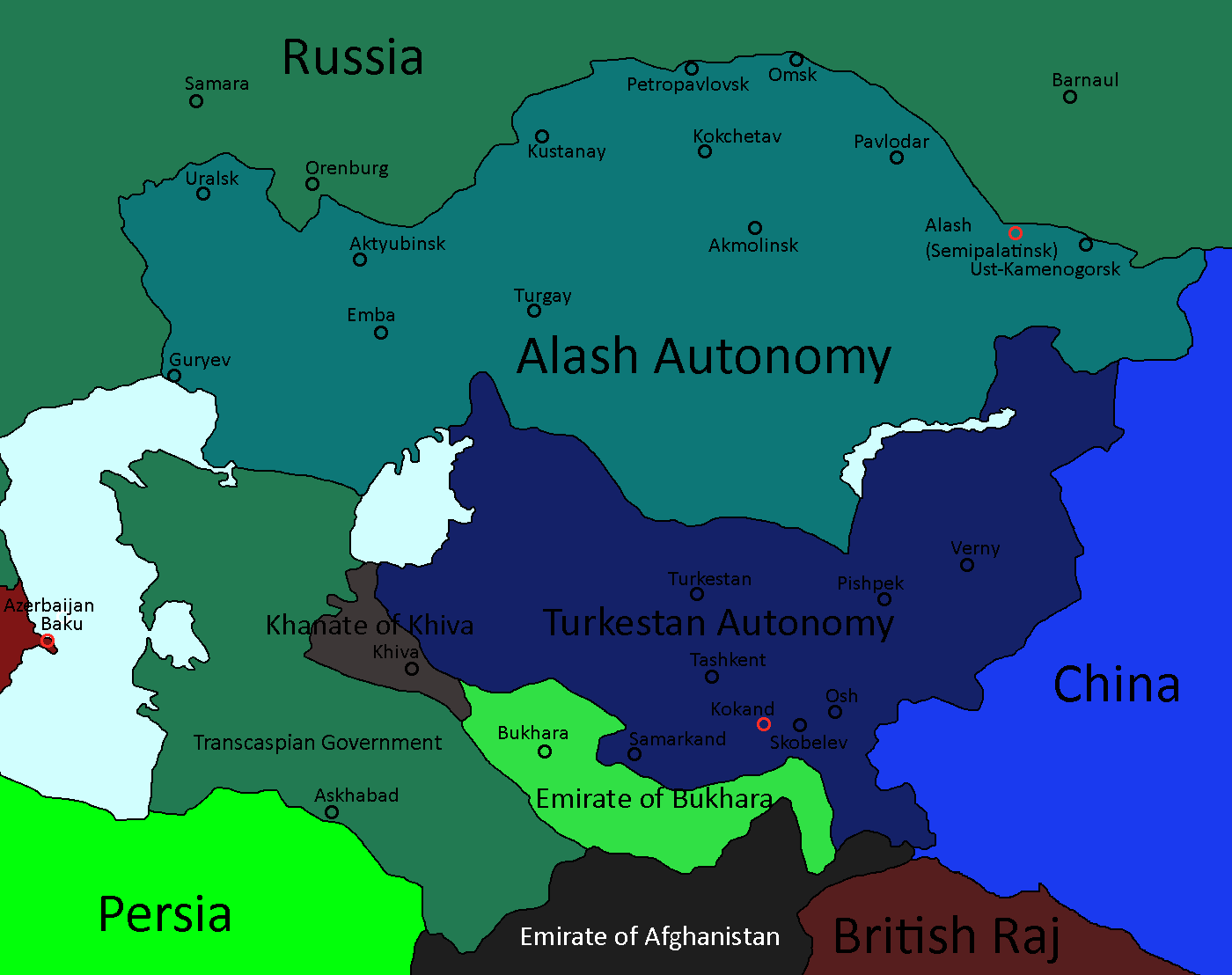
- Alash Autonomy in cyan, Transcaspian Government in green and Turquestan Autonomy in blue.
- Status: Unrecognized autonomy of the Russian Republic
- Capital: Kokand
- Religion: Sunni Islam
- Demonym: Turkestani
- Government: Parliamentary republic
- Prime Minister
  - 1917–1918: Mukhamedzhan Tynyshpaev
  - 1918: Mustafa Shokay
- Legislature: Turkestan People's Assembly (Note: Also called the Turkestan National Assembly.)
- Historical era: Russian Civil War
  - Proclaimed: 27 November 1917
  - Government overthrown: 18 February 1918
  - Kokand falls: 22 February 1918
- Currency: Imperial rubles
Preceded by	Succeeded by
Russian Turkestan	Turkestan Socialist Federative Republic
- Today part of: Kazakhstan, Kyrgyzstan, Tajikistan, Uzbekistan

The Turkestan Autonomy (Note: Uzbek: Turkiston Muxtoriyati) or Kokand Autonomy was a short-lived polity in Central Asia that existed from November 27, 1917, to February 22, 1918. The Autonomy was based in the city of Kokand, and claimed to be the legitimate government of Russian Turkestan, serving as an autonomous government under the Russian Democratic Federative Republic.

The Turkestan Autonomy was founded on November 27, 1917, after the European-led Tashkent Soviet expelled the Russian Provisional Government from the region. The Soviet did not allow Muslims to serve in leadership roles, sparking opposition from the Turkestani intelligentsia and population who broadly sought national autonomy. The government enjoyed support from a majority of the population, successfully holding rallies across the regions in the thousands during which funds were collected, but lacked the ability to effectively govern the region. It was unable to tax the population, establish a military capable of defending the country, or form regional alliances. Despite the Autonomy's claims of authority, the Tashkent Soviet also exercised its power over the region, effectively creating a dual power structure. In February, the Autonomy and allied forces seized Soviet buildings in Kokand, which the Soviet government responded to with force. Negotiations between the Soviet and Autonomy caused a rift in the government between the cabinet and anti-Soviet hardliners, the latter of whom staged a coup against the government and refused to compromise with the Soviet. The Soviet then shelled and invaded the city, causing the Autonomy's disorganized defense to quickly collapse. On February 22, 1918, a delegation from the city officially surrendered to the Soviet.

The Autonomy was led by a provisional government, who were to serve until a constituent assembly was held to determine the final political form of the region. It functioned as a parliamentary republic, where the 12 member Turkestan Provisional Council was subservient to the 52 member Turkestan People's Assembly. The government apportioned seats in the Assembly according to national representation, with a significant percentage of seats in both bodies going to ethnic Russians.

== Background ==
In the 1860s and 70s, the Russian Empire conquered Central Asia. Russian Turkestan was established as an effective colony, and its native inhabitants were deemed inorodtsy, a separate legal and social group to ethnic Russians. Large numbers of Russian settlers moved into the region, creating 'new cities' outside of major urban areas, where they lived generally separately from the native population. After the February Revolution in 1917, the colonial order was ended by the Russian Provisional Government, which instituted a wave of reforms including the end of distinction of citizens based on class, religion, sex, or ethnicity.

In Turkestan, the revolution caused an explosion in the activities of the intelligentsia. Several Turkestani organizations were founded, including the Shuroi Islomiyasi (lit. 'Muslim Council'), an umbrella group for Turkestani organizations mostly composed of progressive Jadids, and the Ulamo Jamiyati (lit. 'Society of Ulama'), a conservative anti-reformist organization that promoted fully replacing Russian law with Sharia. With the end of the Empire, these groups and intellectuals questioned what form the region would take. Proposals for national autonomy were increasingly raised, influenced by the programs of Russia's democratic parties and previous national liberation struggles. While some advocated for complete independence or maintaining the status-quo, by autumn the autonomist movement had become the most dominant force Turkestan's regional politics.

In the wake of the revolution, the Provisional Government attempted to maintain control over Turkestan. However, the recently formed Tashkent Soviet of Soldiers' and Workers' deputies, an organization led exclusively by Russian settlers, took an oppositional stance to the government. By March, they had begun slowly assuming power over Tashkent In autumn the Soviet launched an insurrection against the government forces, and seized control of the city by November 14. The Soviet became the effective government of Tashkent, and the Provisional Government's influence over the region collapsed. The Third Regional Congress of Soviets was held in mid-November during this power vacuum, during which it declared Turkestan under Soviet rule and created a governing Sovnarkom, but did not address autonomy or consider the needs of the native population.

== History ==
=== Establishment ===
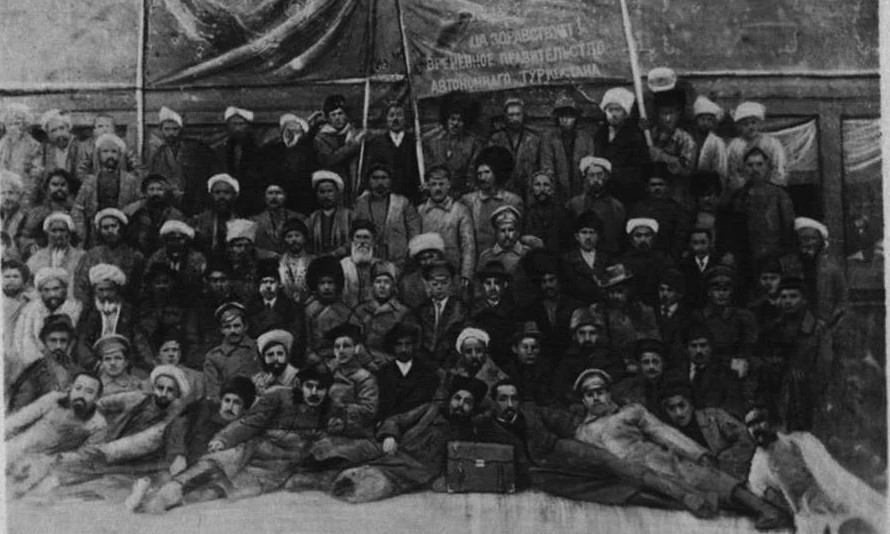
Members of the Turkestan Autonomy's government on December 6, 1917

After the collapse of the Provisional Government, the Ulamo Jamiyati organized the Third Congress of Central Asian Muslims concurrent to the Soviet congress. The congress resolved that the European-led Soviet was unfit to govern a Muslim society they knew little about, though regardless a coalition government should be formed with it until the Russian Constituent Assembly. However, Fyodor Kolesov, president of the Sovnarkom, firmly rejected the offer, stating that "the inclusion of Muslims in the organ of supreme regional power is unacceptable at the present time".

The Sovnarkom's rejection of a joint government and its unpopularity among Turkestan's native population prompted a large coalition of Central Asians to quickly organize the Fourth Extraordinary All-Muslim Regional Congress in Kokand, well before the Constituent Assembly was held. Kokand held a headquarters of Shuroi Islomiya, and was the largest commercial center not under the control of the Tashkent Soviet. A postal strike led many members of the council to not receive their invitations, though some found out through local newspapers or were able to mail their opinions to the congress as it was held. On November 25, 1917, a preliminary meeting was held to decide the agenda, and the congress officially opened noon the next day. The congress was made of approximately 250 people, including almost all major Muslim political figures in the region, regional soviets, and the regional Jewish association. The only major group not present was the ulama of the Ulamo Jamiyati.

On November 27, the congress resolved that Turkestan was an autonomous territory within a Federal Russian Republic, held the right to self-determination, and could establish a constituent assembly. They also decided to join the South-Eastern Union, an anti-Soviet organization that controlled the rail routes to Russia. While they were fervently reactionary and Islamophobic, their control over grain imports led the congress to pragmatically ally with them. A provisional government was organized and elected, led by prime minister Mukhamedzhan Tynyshpaev, and in force until a constituent assembly was held to better define the regional government. Tensions were high throughout deliberations, at one point Sherali Lapin led the remaining members of the Ulamo Jamiyati out of the congress, though they eventually rejoined after a compromise was struck.

=== Influence over Turkestan ===
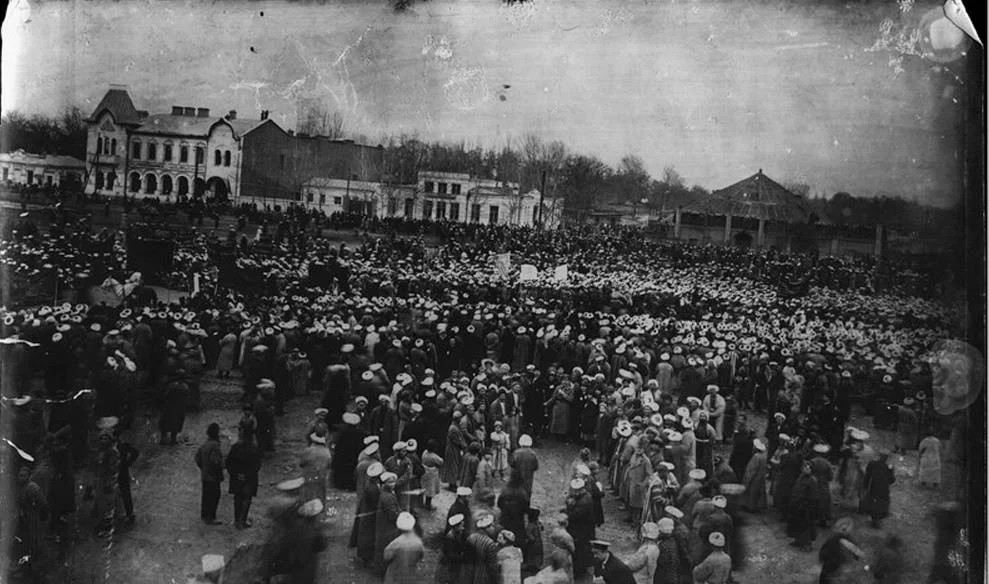
A rally in Kokand in support of the Turkestan Autonomy

The Turkestan government began to distribute pamphlets in December, announcing the creation of the Autonomy, explaining their political program, and calling for "all citizens of Turkestan—Muslims, Russians, Jews, workers, soldiers, and peasants" to support the government. A majority of the indigenous population and several soviets supported the new government, and rallies began to occur around the region in support of the government. Through early December, demonstrations in the thousands occurred in Namangan, Samarkand and Xonobod, and a rally in Tashkent reached 60,000 participants. At the Tashkent rally, a resolution was adopted condemning the Tashkent Soviet for its lack of representation, though still advocating peace.

The Turkestan government declared December 13, the birthday of Muhammad, a day of support for the government, during which money for the country would be collected. The Tashkent City Council allowed a rally to occur in the majority-native old city, but barred demonstrators from entering the majority-European new city so as not to provoke backlash. During the rally members of the crowd started calling to free the city's prisoners and seize power. A group split off and entered the new city, taking the city's chief of security hostage. They negotiated the release of two prisoners, but were halted by soldiers upon trying to take the prisoners to the old city. The soldiers fired into the group after hearing a shot, and several were killed. Others died in an ensuing stampede, and the freed prisoners were summarily executed by the Soviet.

From the establishment of the Turkestan Autonomy, its government attempted a conciliatory stance towards the Tashkent Soviet. The Autonomy offered to send representatives to the Fourth Regional Congress of the Soviets if it was delayed, though this offer was rejected as the Autonomy was still in talks with the South-East Union. The Organization of Muslim Workers and Peasants would appeal to the Sovnarkom of the RSFSR, asking them to make the Tashkent Soviet to recognize the Turkestan Autonomy. This request was rebuked by People's Commissar for Nationalities Joseph Stalin, who stated "The workers of Turkestan should not turn to Petersburg with their request that the Soviet Commissariat in Tashkent should be dissolved, but should disperse it by force, assuming they have the requisite power". Both the Tashkent Soviet and the Turkestan Autonomy continued to claim authority over the region, creating a dual power structure. The Soviet stance towards the Autonomy became increasingly harsh. In mid-January, the Fourth Regional Congress of Soviets voted to outlaw the Autonomy, and arrest its members.

=== Issues governing Turkestan ===
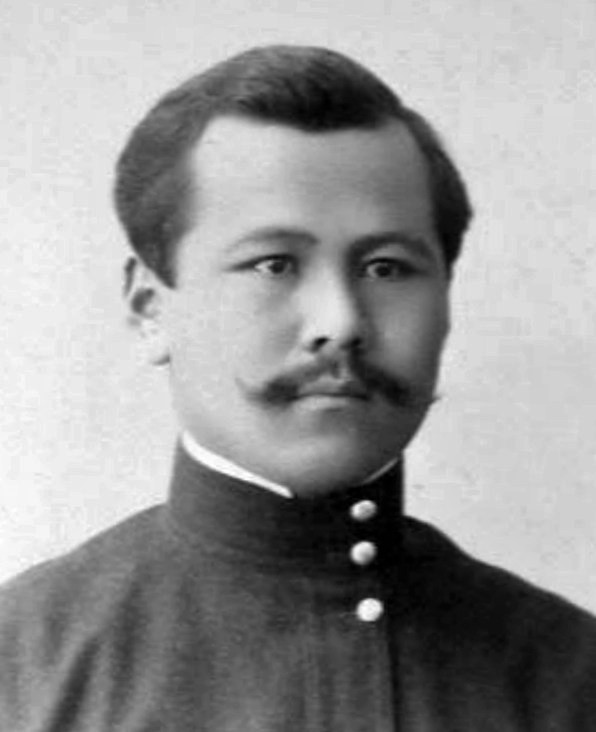
Prime minister Mustafa Shokay, who assumed power after the resignation of Mukhamedzhan Tynyshpaev

Throughout its existence, the Turkestan Autonomy struggled to govern Turkestan. Its leaders had no past experience governing a country, and the region lacked bureaucrats, administrators, or cadres with that experience. This lack of capability manifested in several ways.

The Turkestan Autonomy was unable to establish a financial base. While it was able to acquire 3 million rubles through a loan to the government, (Note: Also reported as 30 million.) and was able to raise money through donations, it lacked the ability to tax the population. Expenditures were high, subsidizing the regional newspapers alone cost 55,000 rubles. Troubles worsened when Soviet forces seized 8 million rubles from the Kokand branch of the Central Bank, including the account of the Turkestan Autonomy. The seizing of the account intensified conflict within the government, leading to Tynyshpaev resigning as prime minister in early January, replaced by Mustafa Shokay.

The Turkestan Autonomy was also unable to establish a strong military force. Shokay's cabinet organized a national army of approximately 2,000 men, bolstered by the Kokand militia under Ergash. By February, Ergash was appointed commander-in-chief of the army. The army possessed only a few guns, no officers, and no trained men, though 60 were being trained by a small group of Russian officers. The government was prevented from buying rifles by the Tashkent Soviet, which convinced Cossack arms dealers passing through the region to not assist a Muslim army.

The Turkestan Autonomy frequently tried to form connections with regional political powers, mostly to failure. In December, Shokay traveled to Orenburg to speak to Alexander Dutov about joining the South-Eastern Union, in accordance with the decision of the congress. However, he found their desire to form a Cossack dominated state unacceptable, and the attempt to join the union was ended at his advice. Talks were held with the Alash Autonomy to form a union, but the Alash Autonomy decided to hold off on any decision until the All-Russian Constituent Assembly. The government also attempted to receive assistance from the Emirate of Bukhara, but as the Emir of Bukhara was in conflict with Jadidists, and worried of an attack from the Taskhent Soviet, he refused to see the government's representatives.

=== Invasion and dissolution ===
Konstantin Osipov in 1918

After the killings during the December 13 Tashkent rally, the Sovnarkom began to form military units. While there had always been an imbalance between Turkestan's and the Soviet's military power, it drastically grew once Dutov's blockade was lifted in January 1918, and arms could enter the region. By late January, armed groups in Kokand aligned with the Soviet began to attack government forces, intensifying after rumors spread that the Turkestan government had massacred the Russians and Armenians of Kokand.

On the night of February 11, Autonomy forces and their allies seized the Soviet-occupied Palace of Khudayar Khan and the headquarters of the Kokand Soviet, taking several prisoners. The Tashkent Soviet placed the region under martial law, and on February 13 a detachment of 120 troops under Konstantin Osipov entered the city. Negotiations were held between the government and allied armed groups, and the Soviet military, the latter demanding the prisoners be freed and perpetrators arrested. These negotiations were ended when a radical leader in the Turkestan government threatened civil war if talks continued, and Soviet forces subsequently decided to attack the city.

Armed conflict began that day, with a shelling of the palace by Soviet troops. In response, irregular forces sprung up in support of the Autonomy, armed with makeshift weapons. Fires, robberies and looting began several days later, targeting both Russians and Turkestanis. The battle split the government between Shokay's cabinet and radical groups such as the Ulamo, who called for him to be removed. The conflict ended on February 18, when commander-in-chief Ergash staged a coup against the government and took control of the country. While the government was fighting, a large contingent of Soviet forces arrived and blockaded the city. On February 19, they gave an ultimatum to Ergash demanding surrender, which he refused. The city was shelled extensively, causing fires to break out and organized resistance to collapse. Once Ergash's militia fled the city, no pro-Autonomy forces were left. On February 22, a delegation from the old city met with the Soviet army, agreeing to disarm and recognize the authority of the Soviet government.

== Aftermath and legacy ==
Flag of the Basmachi movement

After the capture of Kokand by Soviet forces, the city was sacked and over 10,000 residents were massacred. The Soviet government confiscated food from the region, causing a famine. In the summer of 1918, Ergash began the first armed resistance against the new Soviet government in the region, in response to a nationalization campaign. Resistance efforts against the government quickly grew due to the famine, becoming a guerrilla warfare campaign known as the Basmachi movement. The Turkestan Autonomy became a symbol of resistance against the Soviet government in subsequent years.

Action was also taken against the national organizations and individuals who had supported the Autonomy. Supporters of the government were summarily executed, and members of the government fled the region or were arrested. In May 1918, the Tashkent branch of the Ulamo Jamiyati was dissolved by the Sovnarkom, its property was confiscated, and its publications were banned.

After the end of the Turkestan Autonomy, Soviet leadership worked to politically reorganize the region. To this end, the Fifth Regional Congress of Soviets would resolve on April 30 to establish the Turkestan Socialist Federative Republic, legally ratified autumn that year. While legally an autonomous division of the Russian Soviet Socialist Federative Republic, it did not provide the national autonomy that supporters of the Turkestan Autonomy had fought for.

== Government ==
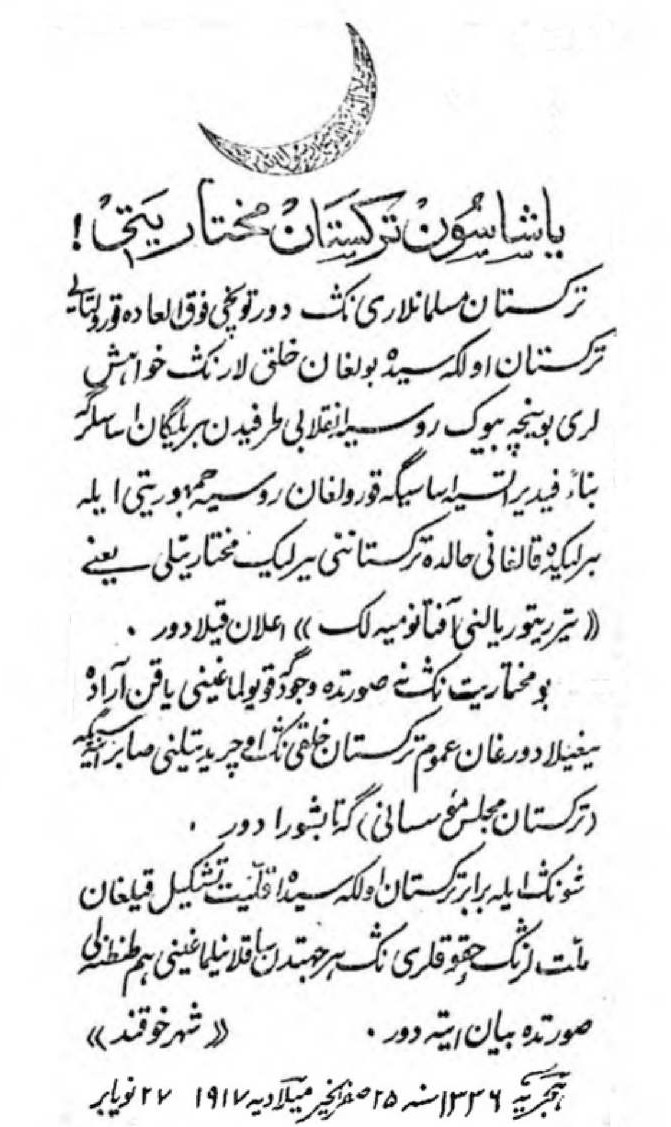
Declaration on the formation of the government of Turkestan Autonomy

The government of the Turkestan Autonomy was organized along the lines of a parliamentary republic, consisting of an executive branch called the Turkestan Provisional Council, which was subordinate to a unicameral legislature called the Turkestan People's Assembly. The People's Assembly was composed of 54 seats, 32 of which were given to the previously chosen delegates to the Russian Constituent Assembly, 4 of which were given to representatives of city government bodies, and 18 of which were given to representatives of various European groups. Representation was to be based on the national groups of the country. The Turkestan Provisional Council was composed of 13 seats and 12 members. (Note: Mukhamedzhan Tynyshpaev held both the position of Prime Minister and Minister of Internal Affairs.) (Note: Only 9 of the 13 positions were filled upon the body's creation, as the Provisional Government was searching for Europeans to fill the remaining roles.)

=== Provisional Council members ===
Ministers Transcaucasian Democratic Federative Republic
Portfolio	Minister
Prime Minister	Mukhamedzhan Tynyshpaev
Minister of Internal Affairs	Mukhamedzhan Tynyshpaev
Deputy Prime Minister	Islam Shagiakhmetov
Minister of Foreign Affairs	Mustafa Shokay
Minister of War	Ubaidulla Khojaev
Minister of Agriculture and Water Resources	Yurali Agayev
Minister of Food	Abidjan Mahmudov
Deputy Minister of Internal Affairs	Abdurakhman-bey Urazayev
Minister of Finance	Solomon Hertzfeld

== See also ==
- List of states and regions involved in the Russian Civil War
- Bibliography of the Russian Revolution and Civil War
- Outline of the Russian Revolution and Civil War
