= Krasny Yar =

Krasny Yar may refer to:

- Krasny Yar (inhabited locality), name of several inhabited localities in Russia
- Krasny Yar Krasnoyarsk, a Russian rugby union club based in Krasnoyarsk
