= Struggle for Turkistan =

Series of battles in Turkistan, 1724–1725

- Part of the Kazakh–Oirat War (1723–1730)
Date	Summer of 1724 – Spring of 1725
Location	Turkistan, Syrdarya Region
Result	Dzungar victory
Territorial changes	Dzungar annexation of the Syrdarya Region

Belligerents
Kazakh Khanate	Dzungar Khanate

Commanders and leaders
(Kazakh Khanate) Abul Khair Khan (Kazakh Khanate) Qabanbai Batyr	(Dzungar Khanate) Tsewang Rabtan (Dzungar Khanate) Shono-Lausanne

Strength
50,000	Unknown

Casualties and losses
10,000	Unknown

The Struggle for Turkistan, or the Struggle for the Kazakh Capital (also Battle of Turkistan) – a series of battles for the capital of the Kazakh Khanate – Turkistan, between the Kazakhs and the Dzungar Khanate.

== Prelude ==
In February and March 1723, a 30,000-strong Dzungar army under the leadership of Lobsangsür invaded the southern nomadic camps of the Kazakhs. As a result of the Dzungar campaign, the Kazakhs lost control over the Syrdarya region, including Turkistan.

== Course of the struggle ==
Eliminating, during the campaigns against the Kalmyk Khanate, the potential threat of a rear attack on the Kazakh clans of the Junior Jüz, Abulkhair, in late summer 1724, redeployed Kazakh combat detachments southwards. He rapidly broke through the dense cordon of advanced Dzungar fortifications in the middle reaches of the Syr Darya, fought his way to Turkistan, and in the autumn of that same year captured it in a powerful assault, forcing the Dzungar commander Shono-Lausanne to retreat to the Karatau Mountains.

Regarding this military operation, the Russian envoy to Bukhara, Florio Beneveni, reported to the College of Foreign Affairs in Moscow on January 15, 1725:

Shono-Lausanne, through war with Abulkhair Khan, had taken the city of Turkistan and 32 uluses, but then he, Abulkhair Khan, joining with the Kazakhs, again came to Turkistan through war and still holds it in his possession to this day.

For more than six months, the Kazakh khan held Turkistan, Tashkent, and the surrounding settlements under his control, but, due to the Dzungars’ superiority in military strength, he was forced, after a series of major battles with Oirat troops, to leave the Syrdarya region in the spring of 1725 and temporarily withdraw with a group of batyrs to the territory of the Bukhara Khanate, then to Khiva, and from there to the lower reaches of the Syr Darya, into the Aral steppes.

Some time later, the Turkmen Osman, who had arrived in Astrakhan from Khiva, reported on June 30, 1725, to Governor A. P. Volynsky, citing the words of the Kalmyk envoy Sukhur-Mengi,

the Karakalpak and Kazakh Abulkhair Khan, having gathered fifty thousand of his troops, fought with the Khuntaiji; and the Khuntaiji destroyed ten thousand of their yurts, and the remaining forty thousand are now marching here to attack the Kalmyk forces, and at present they are on the Emba River.

Following this withdrawal of Abulkhair, the Syrdarya cities were again seized by Dzungar forces in the spring of 1725. The Kazakhs were completely cut off from the urban markets and craft centers of Central Asia.

The direct result of this campaign was that a new wave of Kazakh refugees poured into the north-western and northern regions of Kazakhstan.

== Aftermath ==
After the peace with the Kalmyks, a large-scale Kazakh counteroffensive after the Ordabasy meeying followed, as the Dzungars abandoned the previously seized Syr darya region. In a letter from Abul Khair Khan to Ufa dated 1730, it was stated that the city of Turkistan was under the control of Sameke Khan.
