= UY =

UY or uy may refer to:

== Places ==
- Uruguay (ISO 3166-1 country code UY)
- Upper Yukon region, Canada
- Uy (Irtysh), a tributary of the Irtysh in Russia
- Uy (Tobol), a tributary of the Tobol in Russia

== Other ==
- Uy (surname)
- .uy, the country code top level domain (ccTLD) for Uruguay
- Cameroon Airlines (IATA code UY)
- University of Yangon, Myanmar
- University of Yuryev, Estonia (today University of Tartu)
- Urusei Yatsura, a Japanese manga and anime series
- UY Scuti and UY Sextantis, stars
