= Transoxiana =

Central Asian historical region between the Amu Darya and Syr Darya rivers

Watershed of the Oxus River in the 8th century, showing Transoxiana and its principal localities to the northeast.

Transoxiana and the neighbouring regions of Greater Khorasan and Khwarazm in Central Asia

Transoxiana or Transoxania (lit. 'Land beyond the Oxus', now called the Amu Darya) is the Latin name for the region and civilization located in lower Central Asia roughly corresponding to eastern Uzbekistan, western Tajikistan, southern Kyrgyzstan and parts of southern Kazakhstan, and of Turkmenistan. The name was coined by Alexander the Great in the 4th century BCE when Alexander's troops conquered the region. The region may have had a similar Greek name in Alexander's time, but the earlier name is no longer known. Geographically, it is the region between the rivers Amu Darya to its south and the Syr Darya to its north.

The region of Transoxiana was one of the satrapies (provinces) of the Achaemenid Empire of Persia under the name Sogdia. It was defined within the classical world of Persia to distinguish it from Iran proper, especially its northeastern province of Khorasan, a term originating with the Sasanians, although early Arab historians and geographers tended to subsume the region within the loosely defined term "Khorasan" designating a much larger territory. The territories of Khwarazm, Sogdiana, Chaghaniyan, and Khuttal were located in the southern part of Transoxiana; Chach, Osrushana, and Farghana were located in the northern part.

== Etymology ==
Historically known in Persian as Farā-rūd (Persian: فرارود, [fæɾɒːˈɾuːd̪] – 'beyond the [Amu] river'), Faro-rɵd (Tajik: Фарорӯд), and Varaz-rüd (Tajik: Варазрӯд), the area had been known to the ancient Iranians as Turan, a term used in the Persian national epic Shahnameh. The corresponding Chinese term for the region is Hezhong (Chinese: 河中地区; Chinese: land between rivers). The Arabic term Mā Warāʾ an-Nahr (Arabic: ما وراء النهر, [ˈmaː waˈraːʔ anˈnahr], which means "what is beyond the [Jayhūn] river") passed into Persian literary usage and stayed on until post-Mongol times.

== History ==
=== Pre-Islamic period ===
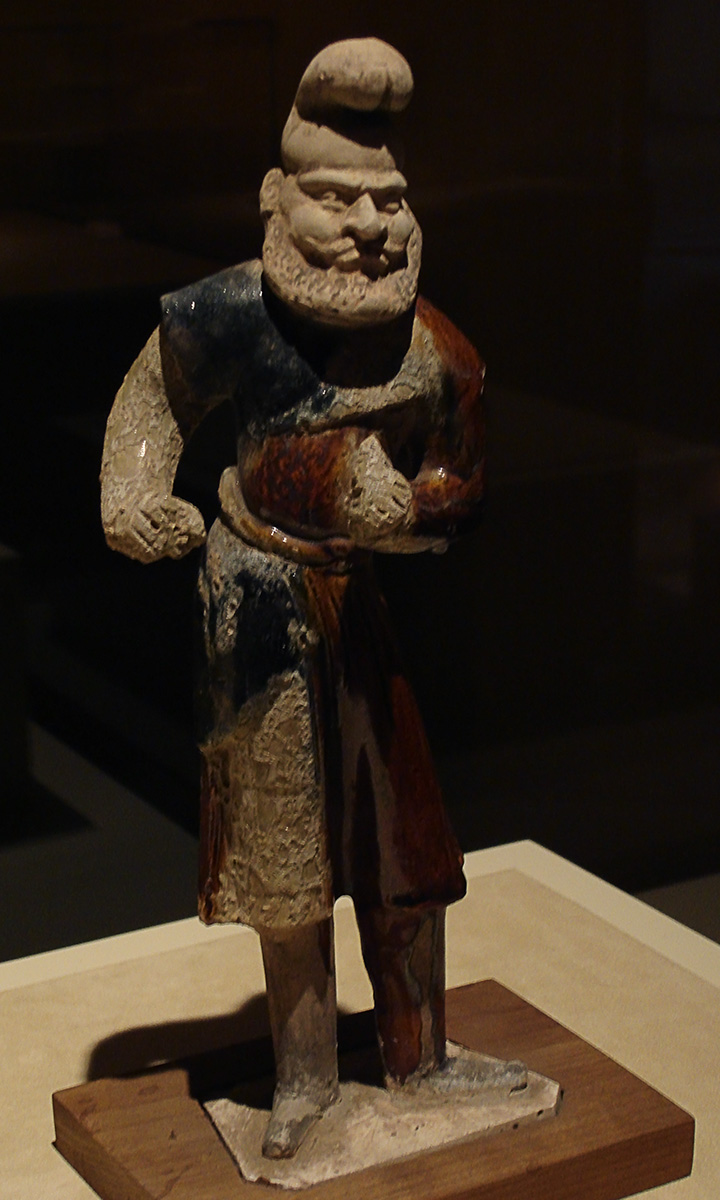
A Chinese sancai ceramic statuette depicting a Sogdian stableman, dated to the Tang dynasty (618–907)

The name Transoxiana stuck in Western consciousness because of the exploits of Alexander the Great, who extended Greek culture into the region with his invasion in the 4th century BCE. Alexander's successors would go on to found the Greco-Bactrian Kingdom, ushering in a distinct Greek cultural presence within Transoxiana that existed for over two hundred years. The city of Ai-Khanoum on the Oxus in northern Afghanistan remains the only Graeco-Bactrian city found and extensively excavated.

During the Sasanian Empire, it was often called Sogdia, a provincial name taken from the Achaemenid Empire, and used to distinguish it from nearby Bactria.

The Chinese explorer Zhang Qian, who visited the neighbouring countries of Bactria and Parthia along with Transoxiana in 126 BCE, made the first known Chinese report on this region. Zhang Qian identifies Parthia as an advanced urban civilisation that farmed grain and grapes and made silver coins and leather goods. It was ruled successively by Seleucids, the Greco-Bactrian Kingdom, the Parthian Empire and the Kushan Empire before Sasanian rule.

In Sasanian times, the region became a major cultural center due to the wealth of the Northern Silk Road. Sasanian rule was interrupted by the Hephthalite invasion at the end of the 5th century and didn't return to the Sasanians until 565 CE.

=== Islamic period ===
Many Persian nobles and landlords escaped to this region after the Muslim conquest of Persia. It was also ruled by Göktürks until the Arab conquest between 705 and 715. The area became known by the Arabic phrase Mā warāʼ al-Nahr "what is beyond the river," sometimes rendered as "Mavarannahr".

Transoxiana's major cities and cultural centers are Samarkand and Bukhara. Both are in the southern portion of Transoxiana (though still to the north of the Amu Darya itself, on the Zarafshon) and Uzbekistan. The majority of the region was dry but fertile plains. Both cities remained centres of Persian culture and civilisation after the Muslim conquest. They played a crucial role in the revival of Persian culture by establishing the Samanid Empire.

Part of this region was conquered by Qutayba ibn Muslim between 706 and 715 and loosely held by the Umayyad Caliphate from 715 to 738. The conquest was consolidated by Nasr ibn Sayyar between 738 and 740 and continued under the control of the Umayyads until 750, when it was replaced by the Abbasid Caliphate. The Tang dynasty of China also controlled the eastern part of the region until the An Lushan Rebellion broke out.

In the early Islamic period, the people of Transoxania spoke Sogdian (an Iranian language) and were divided among several principalities. The Arab conquest resulted in the spread of Arabic elite culture, and, more paradoxically, of New Persian "as a spoken and eventually written language" in the region. The Arab conquest also resulted in contacts with Tang China, where fragments of the Sasanian ruling elite, including Peroz III, had taken shelter after Iran's conquest by the Arabs. However, it did not result in Transoxania having significant interactions with Chinese culture.

Genghis Khan, founder of the Mongol Empire, invaded Transoxiana in 1219 during his conquest of Khwarezm. Before he died in 1227, he assigned the lands of Western Central Asia to his second son, Chagatai Khan, and this region became known as the Chagatai Khanate. In 1369, Timur, of the Barlas tribe, became the effective ruler and made Samarkand the capital of his future empire. Transoxiana was known to be flourishing in the mid-14th century.

== Religion ==
The historian Mark Dickens notes:

Transoxiana's principal pre-Islamic religion was Zoroastrianism, albeit in local manifestations. However, Buddhism, [Nestorian] Christianity, Manichaeism, and Mazdakism also had many adherents, especially in urban areas. This initial religious diversity was gradually eroded after the Arab conquest.

Muslims had conquered Transoxiana by the late 8th century. Multiple figures in the Muslim world had conquered these lands. Some include the Umayyad and Abbasid Arabs, who took over lands that are now Uzbekistan, Tajikistan, Kazakhstan, and Kyrgyzstan.

Apart from a presence in Kushan Bactria, the Mīmāṃsā school of Hinduism, unlike Buddhism, seems to have made little inroads into Central Asia north of Bactria. Even when Brahmins are depicted in the art of Central Asia, this is within the setting of Buddhist art, where we can even observe a tendency to present such figures as caricatures, quite in line with the criticism of them in the Buddhist scriptures.

Transoxania was a great center of Muslim civilization; it was the centre of the Timurid Empire and saw influential Muslim leaders like Timur the Lame and Abu'l Hasan İlig Khan.

Oghuz Khan, a Turkish mythical figure which was later islamified was also rumored to have lived there. An excerpt from a dynastic history commissioned by Eltüzer Khan of Khwarazm: "Oghuz Khan, who could speak at the age of one and whose first word was "Allah." He rebelled against his father, eventually slaying him, before embarking on a series of conquests that brought Islam to all of "Transoxiana and Turkestan".

== See also ==
- Hisar-i Shadman

== Sources ==
- Dickens, Mark (2018). "Transoxiana". In Nicholson, Oliver (ed.). The Oxford Dictionary of Late Antiquity. Oxford: Oxford University Press. ISBN 978-0-19-866277-8.
