= Hisar-i Shadman =

Hisar-i Shadman (Persian: حصار شادمان, Hesār-e Shadman) refers to the ancient territory of Shuman, lying north of the Amu Darya between the Zamel and the Qobazian rivers, which are its tributaries. It is located in what was known as Transoxiana. Ismail I was granted a letter of appointment to the governorship of Hesār-e Shadman (c. 1510) after his famous victory at Merv. Babur was also said to have retreated to Hesār-e Shadman when he could not maintain his position against the Uzbek sultans.
