= Mukhamedzhan Tynyshpaev =

Kazakh engineer, activist, and intellectual (1879–1937)

Muhammedjan Tynyshbayev
- Мұхаммеджан Тынышбайұлы محمدجان تینیچبای اوغولی
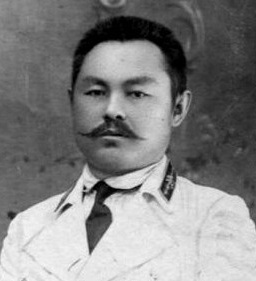
- Born: 12 May 1879; Lepsinsk uyezd, Semirechye Oblast, Russian Empire
- Died: 21 November 1937 (aged 58); Tashkent, Uzbek SSR, Soviet Union
- Occupations: Turkologist; political activist; member of Alash Orda
- Movement: Alash Orda and Kokand Autonomy
- Spouses: Gulbakhram Shalymbekova (died 1923); Aziza Shalymbekova; Amina Tynyshpaeva

Mūhammedjan Tynyşbaiūly (Note: Often transliterated as Muhammedjan Tynyshpaev through a Russified Romanization of Мухамеджан Тынышпаев.) (Kazakh: Мұхаммеджан Тынышбайұлы; محمدجان تینیچبای اوغولی; 12 May 1879 – 21 November 1937) was a Kazakh engineer, activist, and intellectual. He surveyed and engineered the railways of Russian Central Asia, while also being active in the young political newspapers of the region. Through his work, he became known as a political activist, ethnographer, and historian.

== Early life and education ==
Muhammedjan Tynyshbayev was born in 1879 to a Muslim Kazakh, Naiman, Sadyr tribe family in what is today the region of Almaty, Kazakhstan. His father, Tynyshbay, was a minor official in the region. Because of his position, Tynyshbay was able to send the young Mūhammedjan to Verniy (present day Almaty) to attend the all-male Gymnasium on a stipend provided by the Governor-General. With a great and constant interest, he began to study Russian history and the history of Russian literature and culture, in particular, soon he turned out to be equally capable of studying mathematics and other languages, including ancient languages. Mūhammedjan studied from 1889 until his graduation in 1900, excelling in mathematics, languages, literature, and history. After finishing school and thanks to a strong letter of recommendation from his school principal, he left for St. Petersburg to continue his studies. He enrolled at the Imperial Institute of Railway Transport in St. Petersburg, where the Tsarist government funded him with a stipend and living allowance. Despite not being a member of the Kazakh nobility, his education allowed him to work and write in the same circles as some members of the Constitutional Democratic Party (informally known as the Kadets).

== Political career ==
Before graduating, in the winter of 1905–1906, his actions among the young Kadets had earned the attention of the government. Mūhammedjan intended to return home to the Almaty region as usual for the holidays, but received a warning that he would be arrested upon arrival. He remained in St. Petersburg to evade arrest.

In the final decades of the Russian Empire, Mūhammedjan surveyed and planned railway lines, while also writing as a correspondent for several radical publications: Syn Otechestva, Rech’, Radikal, Russkii Turkestan, and most famously, as one of the founding contributors of Qazaq, which acted as the official party organ for the Alash Orda.

In May 1906, he graduated and entered civil service immediately, and that same year was active on the Trans-Caspian Railway. He maintained his political connections and was elected, at the age of 28, to the second Duma in 1907, representing his home region. Mūhammedjan's life became a routine of railway work and contributing articles and news stories for 'Qazaq'. Some sources suggest that he was arrested in 1916, though no sentence was passed. He wrote on the colonial nature of Tsarist steppe policies in that same year, which may have been the reason for his arrest. In February 1917, following the initial Russian Revolution, he published his open letter to the Governor-General of Turkestan. The Provision Government, according to Martha Olcott, "chose several Kazakhs who had worked with the Kadet party to be commissars; these included… Mukhammad Tynyshpaev." Mūhammedjan was considerably less radical than the members of the Bolshevik movement, and advocated for working with the Tsarist government in cooperation with local populations.

He was connected at the time with other Kazakh political figures: Mustafa Chokai, Turar Ryskulov, and Alikhan Bukeikhanov. Mūhammedjan was most politically active in the late 1910s. He was a member of the short-lived Alash autonomy (December 1917 – January, 1920). He was also an early leader of the Turkestan (Kokand) Autonomy, the brutal oppression of which (in early 1918) he escaped. After the consolidation of Soviet power, Mūhammedjan and most of his cohort were absorbed peacefully into the Soviet system.

== Transition to Soviet life ==
In 1921, thanks in part to his friendship with the highly placed Turar Ryskulov, Mūhammedjan was appointed the head of the Department of Water Resources of the People’s Commissariat of Turkestan, and moved to Tashkent. The following year he was appointed to the same position in Chimkent. It was there that he lost his first wife, Gulbakhram Shalymbekova, to cholera. Her brother also perished in the cholera outbreak, so that Mūhammedjan, following his family's wishes and Kazakh tradition, married his newly widowed sister-in-law, Aziza Shalymbekova.

In 1924, Mūhammedjan returned to Tashkent, where he took a teaching position at the Kazakh Pedagogical Institute, teaching physics and mathematics. There he began his brief, but intense, period of scholarly output. In 1925, he was offered as a post of the Chief Engineer for the improvement of the new capital of Kazakh ASSR, Kyzyl-Orda. Under his leadership, new apartment houses were built and administrative buildings of brick, were designed and were built to provide channel Sarkyrama Kyzylorda drinking water. That year, Mūhammedjan married Aziz Shalymbekovoy, but their marriage did not last long, and she and her little daughter Enlik moved to Moscow.

On March 1, 1926, he went to Almaty and began to work as the head of the road department of Semirechensk province, a paved road of Almaty - Bishkek was built. Mūhammedjan also conducted a research on the construction of the road Almaty - Taldykorgan, he also proposed a new version of the road Almaty - Horgos.

Mūhammedjan returned to the railway in the late 1920s, connected with the massive TurkSib project, part of Stalin's first five-year plan. Mūhammedjan was employed there until January 1931. While this would imply that Mūhammedjan worked in regions hit by the disastrous effects of collectivization, there is no record of his observations at that time (1929-1931).

Mūhammedjan was also involved in construction of Almaty-1 station.

== Arrests and execution ==
Despite their peaceful entrance into the Soviet Union, hardly any of Mūhammedjan's early Alash Orda compatriots survived the Great Purge of the 1930s, a campaign of brutal political oppression that targeted peasants, early Bolsheviks, nationalists, and military leaders. Mūhammedjan was denounced as a "bourgeois nationalist" in August 1931, but the investigation failed to find sufficient evidence. At that time, Mūhammedjan's son Daulet Sheikh Ali was born to his third wife, Amina. At his suggestion, Amina gave Daulet her own last name to avoid connection with Mūhammedjan's "bourgeois" reputation. Mūhammedjan was arrested again in 1932 and sentenced to five years of exile (with his family) in Voronezh, where he worked on the construction of the Moscow-Donetsk railway. Following the end of this sentence, Mūhammedjan returned to Tashkent. On November 21, 1937, the state police arrested Mūhammedjan and named him an "Enemy of the People." It is unknown whether he was shot immediately or held for a brief time—he was sentenced to a prison term lasting until April 20, 1938 - perhaps his date of execution.

== His work and legacy ==
Mūhammedjan's scholarly output was not particularly large, but he produced all of it in the space of about five years. Mūhammedjan worked at the time as a professor of mathematics and physics at a pedagogical institute in Tashkent, training a new cadre of teachers among the indigenous population – in the case of this school, the students were primarily Kazakh. This was the first time that Mūhammedjan lived in the same general area for more than three years – his previous employment with the railways had taken him to nearly every populated area in Central Asia.

A large portion of his scholarly output consisted of articles focusing on city ruins, cemeteries, mounds, and other sites which had attracted his attention while working the railroad. Mūhammedjan had no training in archaeology or history. Mūhammedjan wrote about the history of the Kazakhs from a genealogical perspective, lecturing for the Turkestan chapter of the Russian Geographical Society. It was under their auspices that Mūhammedjan published several major articles, including his two most influential works:

- Materially k istorii Kirgizkazakskogo naroda, 1925 (Materials for the history of the Kirgiz-Kazak people)
- Ak-Taban-Shubryndy: Velikie bedstviia i velikie pobedy kazakov, 1927 (Ak-Taban-Shubryndy: The Great Disaster and Great Victory of the Kazaks)

These two works relied heavily on two general sources of data: (one) Russian language scholarship of the nineteenth century, primarily the publications of Muhammed Qanafiya Walikhanov, Aleksei Levshin, and V. V. Barthold, and (two) informants of oral history, though there has been some scholarship concerning the actual personalities involved in this second process.

Apart from new ethnographic material and archaeologically descriptive pieces of ruins near railway lines, Mūhammedjan's direct impact on the body of Kazakh historiography was minimal. However, his legacy in Kazakh historiography is gigantic, particularly since the end of the Soviet Union.

Mūhammedjan was survived by his son Daulet Sheikh Ali (born 1931), his daughter Enlik Tynyshpaeva Malybaeva, his grandchildren, and his great grandchildren.
