= Khan's Grave in Saraishyq =

Medieval monument of the Golden Horde

Khan's Grave
- Хан моласы / Khan molasy (Kazakh)
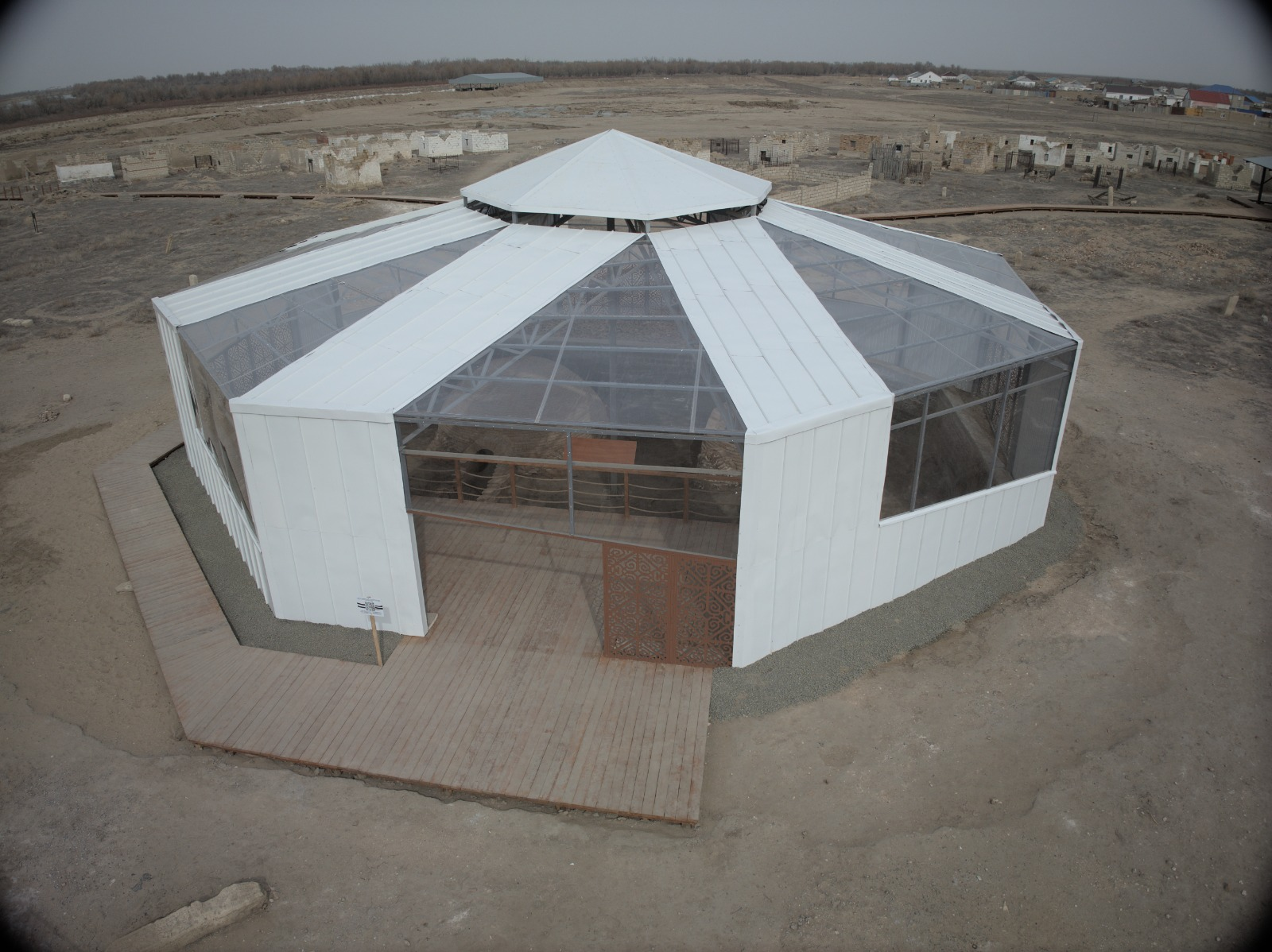
- Interactive map of Khan's Grave
- Type: Archaeological complex
- Location: Saraishyq
- Region: Atyrau Region, Kazakhstan

Site notes
- Condition: Ruined, restored

Khan's Grave or Khan molasy is an archaeological complex located within the citadel of the medieval site of Saraishyq, in the village of Saraishyq, Makhambet District, Atyrau Region, Kazakhstan. For a long time local residents knew the site by this name. Archaeological research at the complex has revealed elite burial structures dating to the 15th century.

== Historical Background ==
One of the earliest written references to "Khan's Grave" appears in the works of military topographer A. E. Alekseyev, who carried out research at the Saraishyq site in 1861. He described a burial structure made of fired brick located in the western part of the city, within the citadel, and noted that local residents called it "Khan's Grave."

According to Alekseyev, traces of ruined buildings and mausoleums survived inside the citadel. Only one mausoleum remained intact, containing six burials. He suggested that members of an entire family might have been buried there. He also recorded that in 1846, on the order of Zhangir Khan of the Bukey Horde, Tatar merchants built wooden fences over the sites of the brick burials.

On the plan of the city of Saraishyq drawn up by Alekseyev, the site within the citadel is marked as "Aulie (crypt)," with a note reading "monument erected in 1835." This map, discovered in 2017 in the Russian State Military Historical Archive, became the basis for subsequent research.

== Ethnographic Evidence ==
One important source of information about "Khan's Grave" is the recollections of public figure Shokan Karzhauov, published by ethnographer Akhmet Toktabai. According to these recollections, Karzhauov, following his father Myrzagali Karzhauov's wishes, buried him near the mazar of Kasym Khan. The account states that Kasym Khan's grave lies inside a semi-underground mosque reached by a staircase, from which one can proceed further to the khan's mazar. This information was taken into account during later archaeological work.

In 2020, archaeologists from the Saraishyq Museum-Reserve discovered the gravestones of Myrzagali Karzhauov and members of his family during excavations.

== Archaeological Research ==
Excavations of the "Khan's Grave" complex were carried out by an archaeological expedition from the State Historical-Cultural Museum-Reserve "Saraishyq" between 2020 and 2022.

The excavations uncovered two mausoleums built of fired ceramic brick. They lay at a depth of about 1.2 meters, with their foundations roughly 2.2 meters below the surface.

=== Eastern mausoleum ===
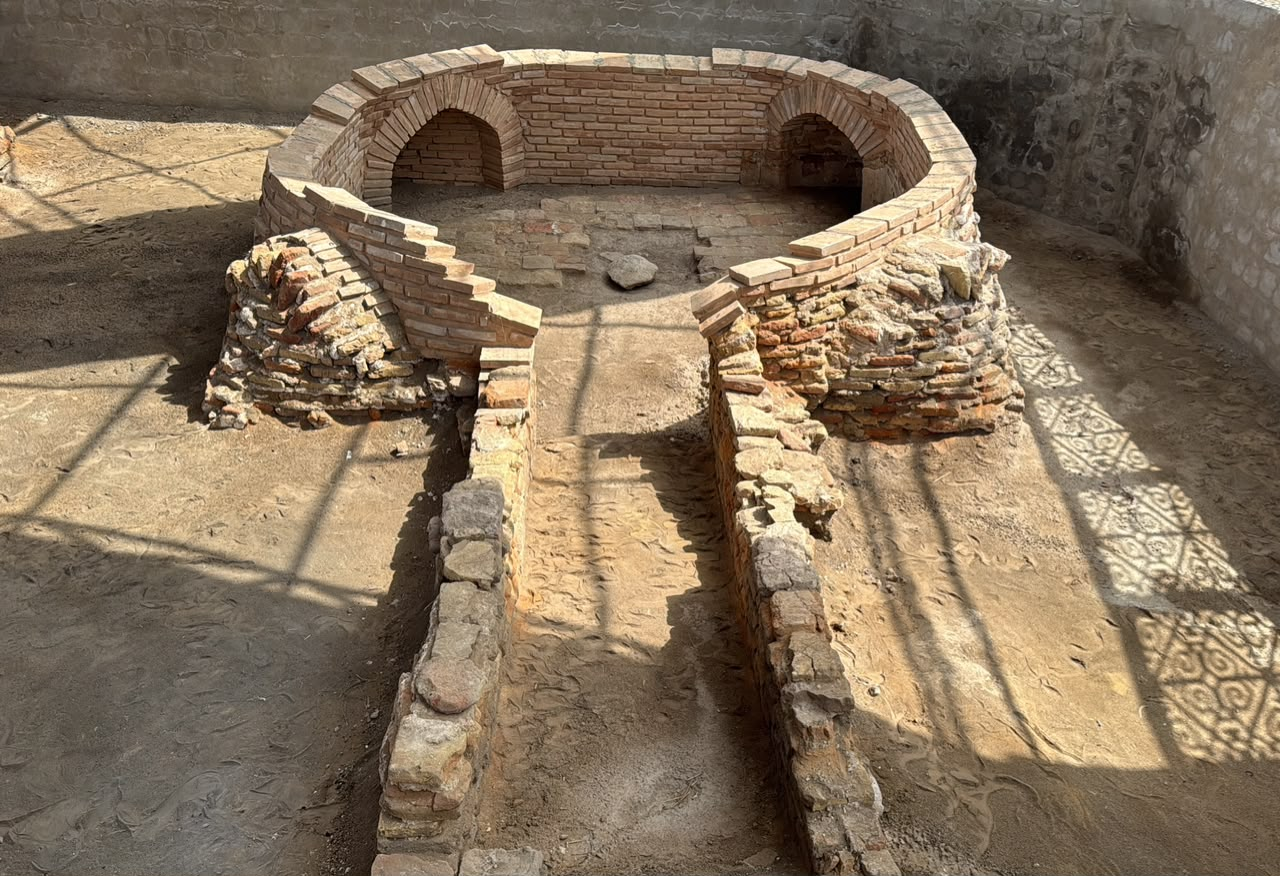
Eastern Mausoleum, 15th Century

The interior measures 4×4 meters. The surviving wall height is 105 cm. The builders used ceramic bricks measuring 22×22×5 cm and 23×23×5 cm, and the floor was also brick-paved.

=== Western mausoleum ===
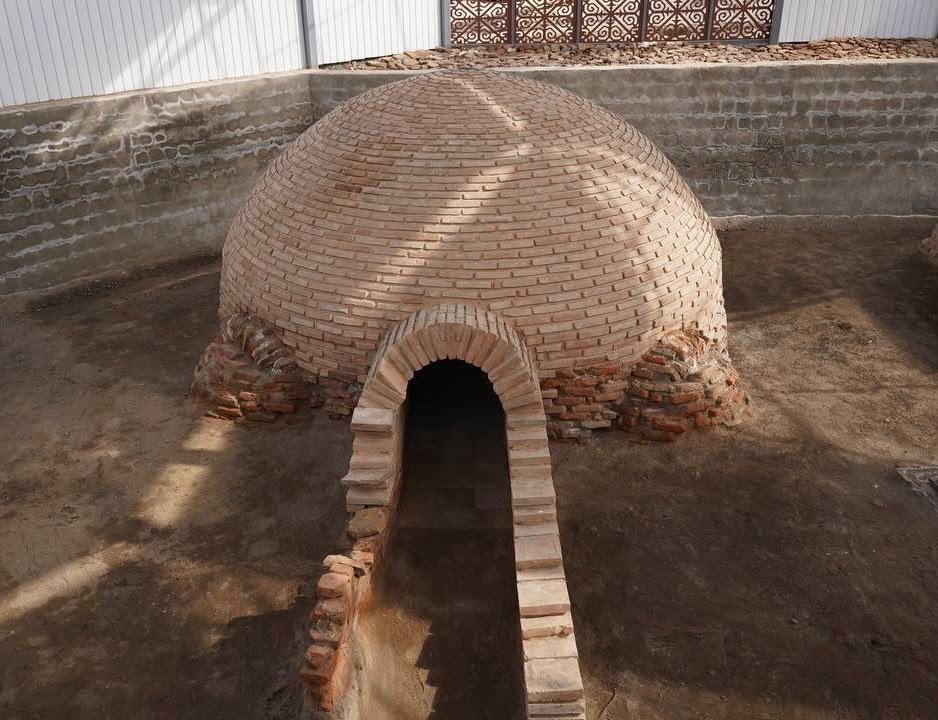
Western Mausoleum, 15th Century

This is a rectangular structure measuring 4.3×4.3 meters. Its corners rise upward to form a pointed domed vault. The floor was tamped down with alabaster powder. Both mausoleums were originally covered by domed roofs.

Near the mausoleums, archaeologists found fragments of architectural decoration made of alabaster, including spiral ornaments and pieces resembling dome finials. Researchers believe these were decorative architectural elements used to adorn medieval mausoleums. Both mausoleums' entrances face southwest and take the form of elongated dromos passages. These dromoi are 375 cm long, 100 cm wide, and survive to a height of 80 cm. They were built separately from the main mausoleum structures, and their brickwork is not bonded to the mausoleum walls. The interior wall surfaces were plastered with white alabaster.

=== Artifacts ===
The excavations yielded copper buttons and fasteners, an iron belt buckle, wide-headed nails, remnants of a wooden coffin, and a fragment of fabric.

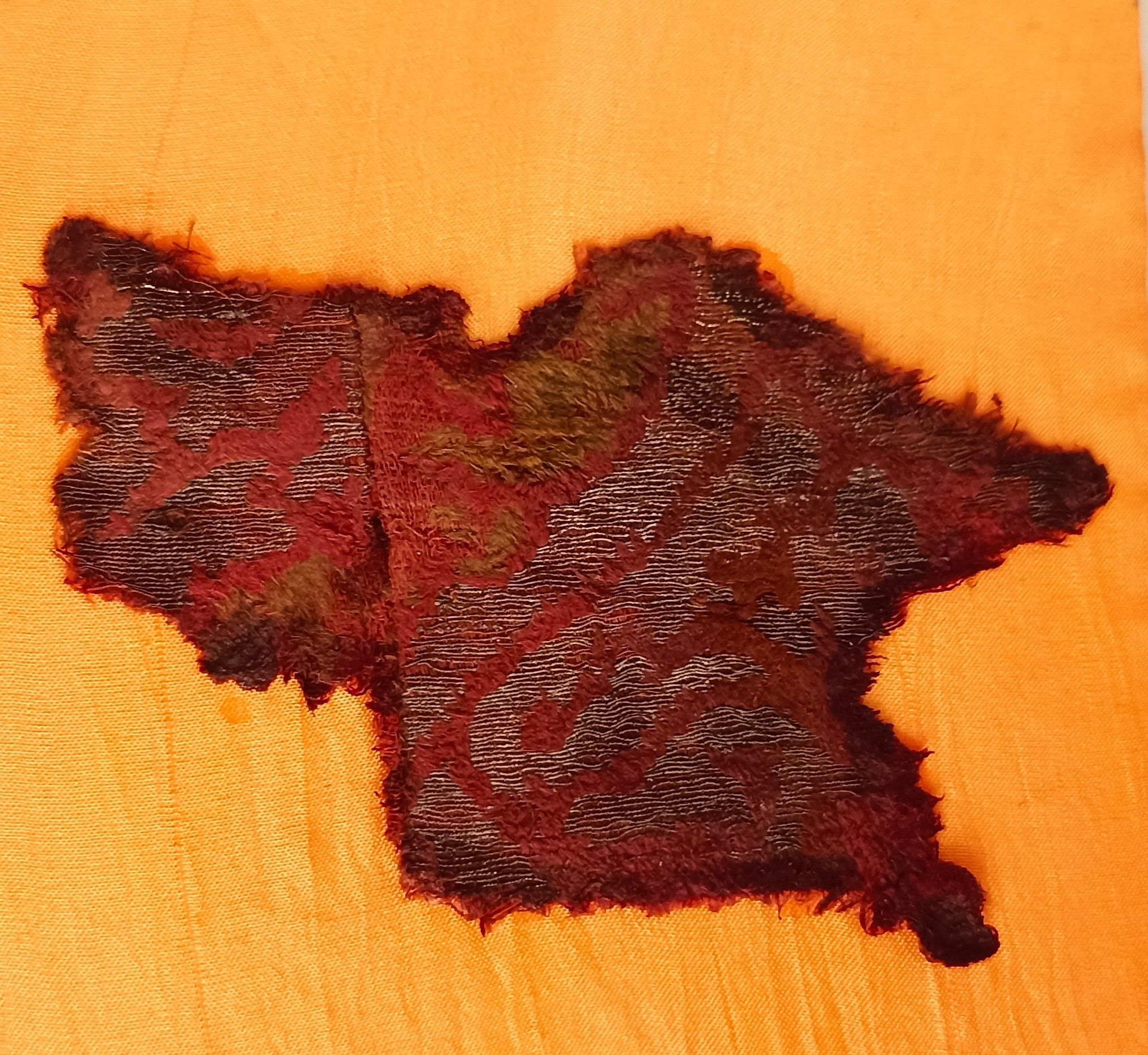
ut Velvet from Sarayshyq, 15th Century

Analysis of the textile fragment showed it was woven from pure silk and decorated with silver threads with gilding — in other words, a cut, or voided, velvet. Researchers believe this may have been a high-quality imported fabric produced in the Ottoman Empire during the 15th–16th centuries.

Fabrics of this kind were worn only by wealthy people of high social standing at the time, so the find is considered important evidence that those buried here belonged to the elite.

== Anthropological and Radiocarbon Research ==
The human remains found in the mausoleums were scattered and out of anatomical order, indicating that the burials had been looted in antiquity and the bricks of the structures had been dismantled for reuse elsewhere.

Radiocarbon analysis of bone samples dated the burials to between 1413 and 1474, corresponding to the mid-15th century.

Researchers believe the complex likely served as a necropolis for the nobility of the Nogai Horde and Kazakh Khanate period.

Stable isotope analysis showed that the diet of those buried consisted mainly of meat, fish, and dairy products, indicating that livestock herding played an important role in the economy of medieval Saraishyq's inhabitants.

== Genetic Research ==
The genetic study of the human skeletal remains uncovered during the archaeological excavations at Saraishyq was conducted by Maksat Zhabagin, head of the Laboratory of Human Population Genetics at the National Center for Biotechnology.

Anthropological study of the human bones from the "Khan's Grave" complex identified the remains of 28 individuals — 16 men and 12 women. Genetic analysis, including Y-chromosome testing to trace paternal lineage, was carried out on the male remains.

The study found that 11 of the 16 men carried haplogroup C2b1a. This haplogroup is widespread among the modern Kazakh population, particularly within the Bayuly and Alimuly tribal groups of the Junior Zhuz. Some researchers link this haplogroup to descendants of Chinggis Khan.

In addition, individual samples carried haplogroups G2a2, E1a1, E1b1b, N1c2, and I2c1 — lineages found among peoples of the Middle East, the Mediterranean, Eastern Europe, the Caucasus, the Baltic region, and Northern Eurasia.

The paleogenetic findings point to a multi-ethnic population in medieval Saraishyq, reflecting Turkic-Kipchak, Caucasian, Middle Eastern, and European components among the city's residents and confirming that Saraishyq was a major hub of international trade and cultural exchange.

== Restoration ==
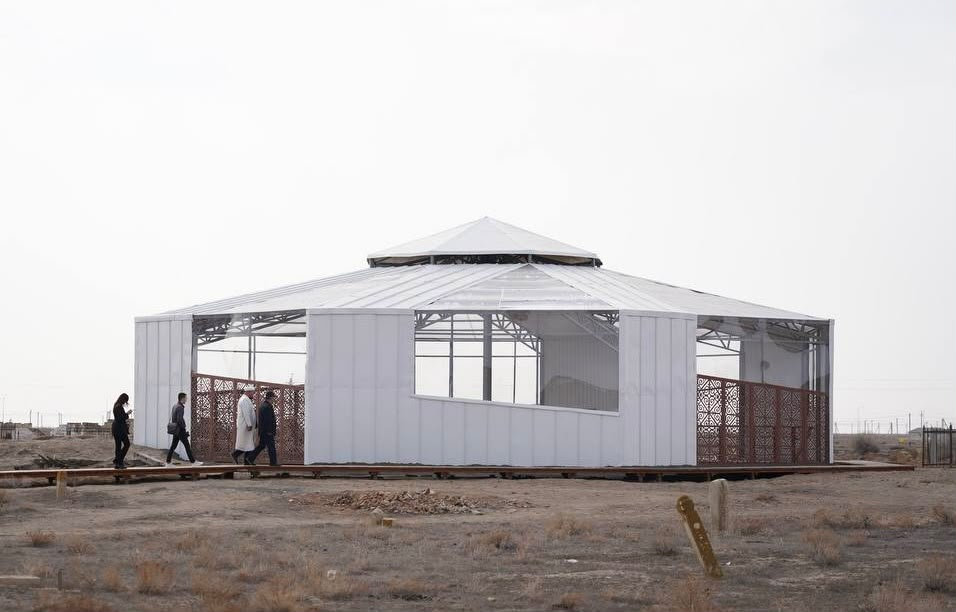
Khan's Grave, 15th Century

In 2025, the state enterprise "Kazkaitazharu" carried out conservation and restoration work on the mausoleums of the "Khan's Grave" complex. As part of the project, a protective covering was installed to shield the archaeological site from environmental damage, and an open-air museum exhibit was created.

== Significance ==
The "Khan's Grave" complex is one of the important archaeological sites for studying the history, burial customs, and social structure of late medieval Saraishyq. The fired-brick mausoleums, architectural decorative elements, high-quality imported textiles, and other artifacts found there point to the high social status of those buried.

Radiocarbon dating places the burials in the mid-15th century, a period when Saraishyq was one of the major political centers of the Nogai Horde era and the formative period of the Kazakh Khanate. This gives the complex particular scholarly importance for studying elite burial traditions of the region.

Genetic research showed a predominance of lineages widespread among the modern Kazakh people, while the presence of haplogroups characteristic of the Caucasus, the Middle East, Eastern Europe, and Northern Eurasia confirms that Saraishyq's population was ethnically diverse, reflecting the city's ties to a range of ethnic and cultural communities.

Together, the archaeological, anthropological, and genetic findings show that "Khan's Grave" is not only a site of local significance but a unique research object for studying the historical processes, population composition, and cultural connections of the Nogai Horde era and the early Kazakh Khanate following the collapse of the Golden Horde.

== Researchers ==
The archaeological research at "Khan's Grave" was conducted by archaeologists from the State Historical-Cultural Museum-Reserve "Saraishyq": A. Muktar, A. Turaruly, A. Zhumabayev, and Zh. Baigaliyev. Historians, anthropologists, and specialized laboratories in Kazakhstan and abroad also took part, carrying out the radiocarbon, genetic, and isotope analyses.
