= Kazakh–Uzbek Wars (1503–1513) =

Military conflicts in central Asia, 1503–1513

- Part of the Kazakh–Uzbek Wars
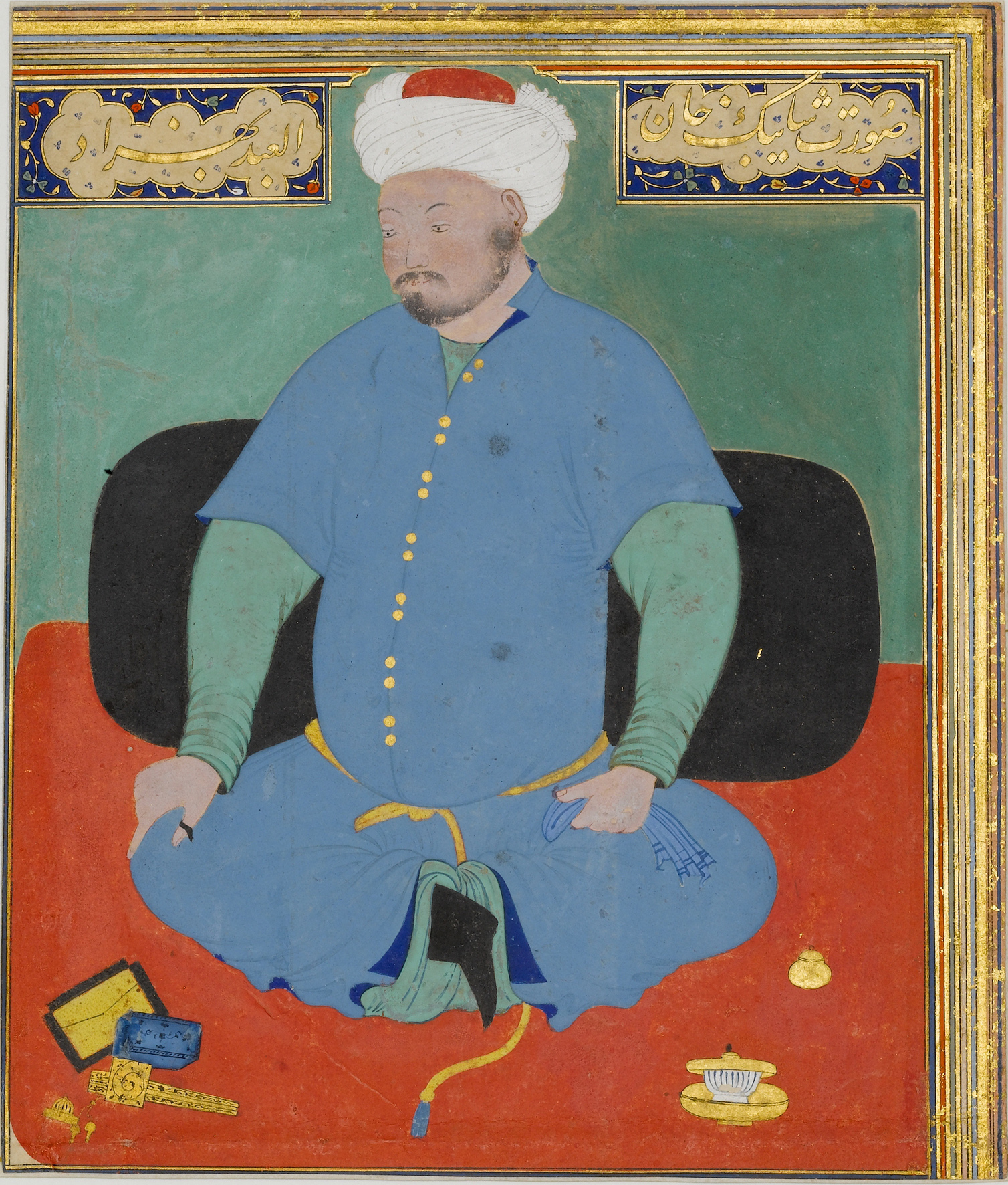
- Portrait of Muhammad Shaybani; Kamāl ud-Dīn Behzād, 16th century
| Date | 1503–1513 (1510) |
| Location | Turkestan, Kazakh Steppe, Transoxiana |
| Result | Kazakh victory |
| Territorial changes | The annexation of Sayram, Turkistan and Tashkent to the Kazakh Khanate |

Belligerents
| Kazakh Khanate | Khanate of Bukhara |

Commanders and leaders
| (Kazakh Khanate) Burunduk Khan (Kazakh Khanate) Akhmet Sultan (POW) (executed) (Kazakh Khanate) Zhanish Sultan (Kazakh Khanate) Tanish Sultan (Kazakh Khanate) Kasym Khan | Muhammad Shaybani (until 1510); Suyunchkhoja Khan; Ubaidullah Khan; Kuchkunji Khan; Hamza Sultan; Kanbar Mirza † |

Kazakh–Uzbek wars (1503–1513) (Wars with the Shaybanids of Transoxiana; Wars of the Kazakhs with Muhammad Shaybani Khan) were a series of military conflicts between the Kazakh Khanate and the Shaybanid Uzbek state from 1503 to 1513 (1510).

== Background ==
At the end of the 15th century, the Kazakh khans and Muhammad Shaybani were almost constantly at war over Southern Kazakhstan. The conflict ended with a temporary reconciliation and a division of territory. The Shaybanids took control of the southern cities, such as Otrar and Turkistan, expelling the Timurids. Meanwhile, the northern part of Turkistan (including Sighnaq and Sauran) remained under the control of the Kazakh khans. The Kazakh khans, relying on Western Jetysu, grew stronger and subdued the steppe tribes. The power struggle was mainly concentrated in the region of Prisyurdarya and Karatau. By the end of the century, Muhammad Shaybani was only able to establish himself in the southern part of Turkistan and founded the Shaybanid State (Bukhara Khanate).

Burunduk Khan managed to keep Muhammad Shaybani Khan out of the Kipchak Steppe, but he could not completely destroy him. In 1500, a peace treaty was concluded between the Kazakh ruler and Shaybani Khan, which included marital alliances. Later, Muhammad Shaybani Khan began to gather supporters of Abulkhayr Khan and began the conquest of the Timurid lands in Transoxiana and Khorasan, taking advantage of the internal struggles among the Timurid princes. Over the next seven years, Muhammad Shaybani Khan and his followers, known as the Shibanid Uzbeks, captured Samarkand, Bukhara, Khorezm, and Khorasan, as well as Tashkent and Fergana from the Moguls, restoring the Abulkhairid dynasty.

Despite the truce, the Kazakhs resumed their offensive and repeatedly raided Shaybani Khan's possessions in Transoxiana. By this time, having become the most powerful ruler in Central Asia, Shaybani Khan launched a series of punitive expeditions against the Kazakhs, but they ultimately yielded no long-term results.

=== Significance of the Syr Darya Cities ===
In the 15th–16th centuries, Turkistan was defined as the region of the middle course of the Syr Darya, bounded in the northeast by the Karatau Range. According to the historian Fazlallah Khunji Isfahani, this region consisted of thirty fortified cities located along the river Sayhun.

The boundaries of Turkistan were clearly delineated by key cities: Arkuk in the west (toward Transoxiana), Turkistan (city) and Sauran in the east, and Sygnak in the north.

The cities along the Syr Darya were of great importance, as they functioned as major centers of trade, administration, and as powerful fortresses. For the Kazakh tribes, the lands of the middle Syr Darya were also valuable as winter pastures. The necessity of controlling these key fortified cities in order to use the surrounding pastures explains the continuous struggle for Turkistan between the Shaybanids and Kazakh rulers.

== Course of events ==
The weakening of the khan’s power during the struggle between Burunduk and Kasym allowed the Kazakh sultans to intensify raids on neighboring territories. In response, Muhammad Shaybani Khan conducted several raiding expeditions against Kazakh territory from 1503 to 1506, reaching as far as Kara-Abdal — the center of the Kazakh winter pastures. However, after his withdrawal south, the Kazakhs again advanced on Turkistan and even entered Transoxiana. Cities along the Syr Darya often changed hands. By the end of the 1500s, a significant portion of Turkistan was controlled by DJanish Sultan.

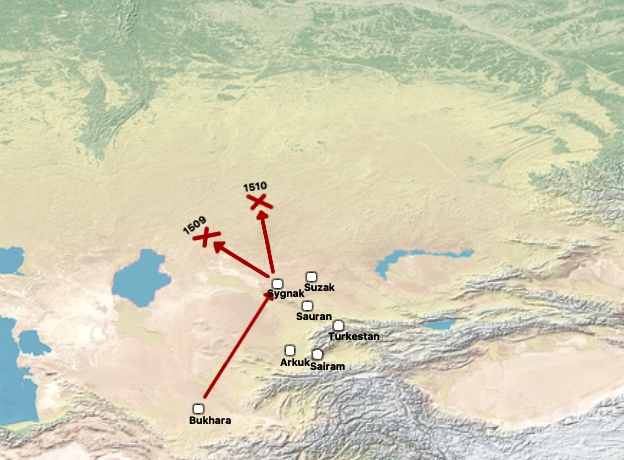
Muhammad Shaybani's campaigns against the Kazakh Khanate

Shaybani launched four campaigns against the Kazakhs in 1504, 1507–1508, 1508–1509, and 1509–1510.

The first campaign was carried out in response to a Kazakh raid. As a result of the campaign, Shaybani was unable to force the Kazakhs into a large battle. According to historian Atygaev, he looted the cities controlled by the Kazakhs, rather than attacking the khan’s territories, and ultimately achieved no significant results. The second campaign took place at the end of 1507 or the beginning of 1508, though the decision was made by Shaybani in the summer. The Uzbek forces, bypassing Sygnak, attacked Burunduk Khan’s ulus. As reported in the "Mikhman-name-i Bukhara," the Kazakh khan fled, abandoning his cattle and property. Nevertheless, Shaybani again failed to achieve success, as he was unable to defeat the Kazakh Khanate or eliminate the threat it posed to his lands. Mirza Muhammad Haidar does not mention a victory for Shaybani in his works. In response to these actions, Ahmed Sultan, in the summer of 1508, led a 50,000-strong army on a raid against Samarkand and Bukhara, capturing several thousand people and returning to the ulus of his father, Janish Sultan.

Ahmed's actions served as a pretext for Shaybani Khan’s next campaign. Following a meeting, he declared a gasavat (holy war) against the Kazakhs. In early 1509, Shaybani assembled an army of 300,000 men. Reaching Arukuk, he gathered provisions and advanced toward the Kazakhs. Once again bypassing Sygnak, he engaged in battle with the ulus of Janish Sultan. In the ensuing battle, the Kazakhs were defeated, and Ahmed Sultan was captured and later executed. As the Uzbek army advanced through the steppe, they suffered significant losses from the cold, and morale began to decline. However, after some time, they encountered a 14-year-old slave-gulam who led them to the ulus of Tanish Sultan. In the subsequent battle, the unsuspecting Kazakhs were once again defeated. Despite this, at the end of the campaign, Shaybani still did not achieve success.

The fourth campaign targeted the ulus of Kasim Sultan. To carry it out, Shaybani gathered an army of 200,000 men and in late 1509 set out against the Kazakhs. Shaybani sent Muhammad Timur Sultan and Ubaydallah-Sultan on the campaign while he remained in his camp near Kok-Kashan. The Shaybanids reached the Ulytau mountains. The Kazakhs' lack of knowledge about the campaign coincided with the withdrawal of Kazakh forces to another region.. Kasim Sultan, unable to respond immediately, ordered a retreat to the foothills of Ulytau. The abandoned Kazakh camp and all the cattle were looted. After that, Kasim sent a reconnaissance detachment led by Moyunsiz-Khasan. At night, the Uzbeks, without sentries, suffered defeat and fled. In the battle that followed, many Uzbek commanders were killed, including the ruler of Balkh, Kambar-Mirza. The commanders of the defeated army retreated to Shaybani and reported the defeat, after which Muhammad Shaybani Khan “struck the drum of retreat and did not attempt to obtain further news.” "Thus, even for Shaybani, in the brilliant period of his life, Kasim Khan was terrifying." notes V.V. Velyaminov-Zernov on this matter. Moyunsiz-Khasan continued to pursue the demoralized enemy and succeeded in killing several more of Shaybani Khan's close associates.

Zahir ad-Din Babur was able to briefly restore his power in Mawarannahr but lacked strong local support. His pro-Shiite policies alienated the local Sunni population, which the Shaybanids took advantage of. In 1512, Babur's army was defeated by Ubaydallah Sultan at the Battle of Kul-i Malik, and Babur was expelled from Central Asia, where Shaybanid rule was reestablished. At the same time, another group of Uzbek tribes under the leadership of the Shaybanids (descendants of Bureke Sultan) migrated to Khwarezm, leading to the formation of two Shaybanid states in the region. During this period, Kazakh Khan Kasim Sultan, strengthening his position, annexed Sayram (1513).

Afterward, he launched a campaign against Turkistan and Tashkent. According to one version, he raided the surrounding areas and returned. According to another version, Sultan Suyunchodja left Tashkent, and in the ensuing battle, Kasim fell from his horse, but the Uzbek forces did not recognize him, and his bodyguards quickly helped him up, after which he retreated. According to Atygaev, the first version, based on the account of the Moghul historian Mirza Muhammad Haidar, who had no interest in the confrontation between the Kazakhs and Uzbeks, seems more neutral than the version of the Shaybanid Abdallah-Balkhi.

The political situation of the Shaybanids in Mawarannahr was complicated: they were threatened by Kasym from the north, the Moghul Khan Sultan Said, and, most importantly, the Safavid state of Shah Ismail, which was preparing for an invasion in the spring of 1514. Under pressure from three fronts, the Shaybanids were forced to make peace with the Kazakh Khanate, recognizing Kasym Khan’s rights over Turkistan (the cities of Turkistan and Tashkent and their surrounding regions came under Kasim's control).

== Peace treaty ==
Ubaydullah Khan sent ambassadors to the Kazakh Khan Kasym (Qasym) with a proposal for marriage to one of his daughters. Kasym Khan agreed, and his daughter was sent to Bukhara. This union was a dynastic marriage, which often sealed military-political agreements. For Kasym Khan, this alliance with the Shibanids was politically advantageous. It allowed the Kazakh Khanate to solidify control over region of Turkistan and freed up resources to confront the Nogai Horde.

== Aftermath ==
According to the Oxford Encyclopedia, the defeat suffered in 1510 by Kasym Khan contributed to the downfall of Muhammad Shaybani Khan. Contemporary authors note that the defeat of the Uzbek forces had significant consequences for both the Shibanid state and Shaybani Khan himself. This defeat, as expressed by Abdallah Balkhi, "marked the peak of his dominion, and the time for its decline had arrived," and it is no coincidence that Abulghazi refers to Kasym Khan as the cause of Muhammad Shaybani Khan's demise. In the fall of the same year, still reeling from the defeat, Muhammad Shaybani marched against Shah Ismail I and died in the Battle of Merv. The death of Shaybani Khan created a favorable situation for Kasym, allowing him to annex much of Turkistan to the Kazakh Khanate.
