= Battle of Sogunluk =

1473 battle during the conquest of Turkestan

- Part of Conquest of Vilayat of Turkestan
Date	c. winter 1473 or 1474
Location	Sozak
Result	Initially, victory of Sheiban, later of Kazakhs

Belligerents
Kazakh Khanate	Bukhara Khanate; Nogai Horde

Commanders and leaders
Mahmoud sultan †; Burunduk Khan	Muhammad Shaybani; Musa mirza

Strength
100,000	100

Battle of Sogunluk was a winter battle of 1473 during the conquest of Turkestan by Mahmud Sultan.

== Background ==
The ruler of Sozak, Mahmud Sultan, son of Janibek Khan, in agreement with Burunduk, intended to obstruct the increase of Muhammad Shaybani's influence in Turkestan and expand his own possessions in the region. This was confirmed by Kamal ad-Din Binai:

("He, Mahmud Sultan, gathered... an innumerable army to set out for the conquest of the vilayet of Turkestan").

According to Binai and Shadi, Muhammad Shaybani hastened to forestall the Sultan and set out for Sozak himself with a hundred warriors.

== About sources ==
Authors of works created in the Shaybanid environment (Kamal ad-Din Binai, Muhammad-Salih, Molla Shadi, as well as the anonymous author of the chronicle "Tavarih-i guzida-yi Nusrat-name" and others) often presented events in a distorted light. For example, in their descriptions, Muhammad Shaybani is credited with victories over Kazakh forces that significantly outnumbered him, despite the fact that, by their own accounts, he had only a few dozen men at his disposal. Such inconsistencies testify to the tendency of these authors to exaggerate the military successes of the Shaybanids and to an biased reporting of the events occurring in the steppes of Kazakhstan and the Aral Sea region.

== Battle ==
The ruler of Sozak, Mahmud Sultan, acting in concert with Burunduk Khan, sought to weaken Muhammad Shaybani's influence in Turkestan and expand his own domains in the region. According to the historian Kamal ad-Din Binai, Mahmud Sultan assembled a large army with the aim of conquering Turkestan. However, upon learning of this, Muhammad Shaybani took preemptive measures and set out for Sozak with a detachment of one hundred men.

The battle between them took place in winter near the moat of the Sozak fortress. Despite the numerical superiority of the Kazakh forces, Muhammad Shaybani's detachment managed to scatter the enemy, captured rich spoils, and returned to Sygnak. Nevertheless, he made no attempt to take the Sozak fortress itself. Soon, Mahmud Sultan gathered a new army, and was joined by Burunduk. Their combined army was numerous—as Molla Shadi noted, it «went beyond calculation». Learning of this, Muhammad Shaybani set out from Sygnak to meet them. The decisive encounter occurred at the Sogunluk Pass in the Karatau Mountains. «Both vast armies converged from all sides at Sogunluk-daban. Formation against formation, like mountains, from both sides, the vanguards of both armies stepped forward. In each [army], the right and left hands, the ambush site, the center, and the wings were precisely established». In formation, each flank consisted of two parts: the «hand» and the «wing». This indicates the use of the «kanbul»—a special unit for flank protection—in the deployment. Its task was to prevent the enemy from outflanking the army's wing. «Kanbuls» were effectively used by Timur in battles against the steppe armies of Tokhtamysh. According to data collected by K.S. Akhmetzhan, in the battle formation of the Kazakh army, not only the flank but also the vanguard could consist of two parts, divided into the «karaul» and the «ertaul». During the battle, Mahmud Sultan was killed, but Muhammad Shaybani also suffered a serious defeat. Consequently, Shaybani was forced to leave Turkestan. Chikmak-yuzbegi, who fought on the side of the Kazakhs, also perished in the battle. In the same engagement fell Emir Bek-Ata-Bahadur—one of the yigits of Turkestan, who had previously fled Otrar from the Timurid governor and joined Shaybani Khan.

== Consequences ==
After being defeated, Muhammad Shaybani was forced to leave Turkestan. According to the source "Tavarih-i guzida-yi Nusrat-name" from Khwarezm, he departed for Mangyshlak. Thus ended Muhammad Shaybani's second attempt to establish control over his grandfather's lands, which also failed to bring him success in the Syr Darya region, particularly in the steppe areas of the Kazakh Dasht-i Qipchaq, where Burunduk Khan had already occupied Sygnak.

== Meaning ==
Janiibek and Kerey, the Kazakh khans, and subsequently the son of the latter, Burunduk, successfully subordinated the Eastern Dasht-i Qipchaq in the 1470s, strengthening their positions in the southern regions of Kazakhstan. Holding domains in Western Zhetysu, they became a significant political force in the steppes of Central Kazakhstan, although they faced powerful adversaries from the Shaybanids and the Manghit leaders.

== Bibliography ==
- Bobrov, L. A. (2013). Казахская тактика ведения боя в конном строю в XV-XVI веках // Война и оружие [[Kazakh tactics of combat on horseback in the 15th-16th centuries // War and weapons]] (in Russian). Война и оружие. Новые исследования и материалы.
- Pishchulina, K. A. (2016). Uskenbay, K. Z.; Dzhandosova, Z. A. (eds.). Очерки истории казахского ханства [Essays on history of Kazakh Khanate] (in Russian). Almaty: Институт истории и этиологии им Ч. Ч. Валиханова. ISBN 978-601-7342-14-2.
- Klyashtorny, S. G.; Sultanov, T. I. (1992). Казахстан. Летопись: трех тысячелетий [Kazakhstan. Chronicle: three millennia] (in Russian). Almaty: Рауан. p. 294.
