= Capture of Sawran (1470) =

Battle between the Kazakh Khanate and Khanate of Bukhara

- Part of the Kazakh War of Independence of Kazakh–Uzbek Wars
Date	Winter 1470
Location	Sawran (Kazakhstan), Kazakhstan
Result	Kazakh victory

Belligerents
Kazakh Khanate	Khanate of Bukhara

Commanders and leaders
Irenji Sultan	Unknown

The Capture of Sawran was a military conflict during the Kazakh War of Independence when Irenji Sultan took Sawran.

== Background ==
The Kazakh Sultan considered the cities located on the Syr Darya as important defensive and strategic points. In the struggle for dominance over the steppe territories, opposing sides sought to establish themselves in cities of the Karatau and Syr Darya regions, which were closest to their nomadic routes. These cities served as fortified strongholds capable of withstanding prolonged sieges and provided both economic and military support. By relying on the cities of Turkestan, Kazakh khans and sultans could strengthen their authority over the steppe aristocracy more quickly. This explains the persistence of the Kazakh khans in their fight to subjugate the cities of Turkistan (Syr Darya region) despite numerous rivals.

These same factors played a key role for Muhammad Shaybani, who, in the early stages of his campaign, sought to restore Shaybanid rule in Eastern Desht-i Kipchak. He challenged the authority of the Kazakh khans, who regarded themselves as the rightful heirs of the rulers of the White Horde, from whom Shaybanid Abu'l-Khayr had once seized the throne.

The struggle between the Kazakh khans and the Shaybanids for power in Eastern Dasht-i Kipchak and Turkestan in the late 15th century unfolded in several stages, each marked by shifts in the balance of power in favor of one side or the other.

== History ==
By the winter of 1470, the Kazakh rulers had made significant progress into Turkistan. Irenchi-sultan, the eldest son of Janibek Khan, captured Sauran, which strengthened the Kazakh position in the region. This was an important step in the fight against Shaybanid, as Sauran was a strategically significant city for controlling Southern Kazakhstan. At the same time, Mahmud-sultan, another son of Janibek, seized Suyzak in the foothills of the Karatau, securing another important point in the south. Kerei khan, aiming to ensure control over Turkistan and prevent the consolidation of the Shaybanids in these key cities, actively advanced toward these territories. This Kazakh offensive, aimed at preventing the establishment of the Shaybanids and strengthening their power in Eastern Desht-i-Kipchak, became decisive in these events.
