= Tore dynasty =

Descendants of Genghis Khan

Töre Төре
- Parent house: Borjigin, Jochids, House of Urus Khan
- Country: Kazakh Khanate; Junior Jüz; Middle Jüz; Senior Jüz
- Origin: Golden Horde
- Founded: 1465
- Founder: Kerei Khan
- Final ruler: Kenesary Khan (Kazakh Khanate); Alikhan Bukeikhanov (Alash Orda)
- Titles: Khan, Sultan, Ağa Sultan; Khan of Kazakh Khanate; Khan of Qasim Khanate; Khan of Khiva; Khan of Yarkent Khanate; Khan of Bashkirs; Khan of Nogais; Khan of Kyrgyz; Khan of Karakalpaks; Khan of Oirats; Chairman of the Alash Orda (Prime Minister of Kazakhstan)
- Estate: Kazakhstan
- Deposition: 1860

Töre (Kazakh: Төре, romanized: Töre, تورە) was a Kazakh dynasty and later a clan that is presumably the descendants of Genghis Khan. The dynasty constituted the upper class of the aristocratic elite that ruled in the Kazakh Khanate. They were also called "Aqsüiek" and "Sūltan töre". Only Töre were eligible to claim the Kazakh Khan title. The first Kazakh Khans from the Töre dynasty were Kerei Khan and Janibek Khan.

The qūn (Kazakh: Құн), also known as the legal punishment for a crime, for killing a Töre was seven times higher than for a commoner.

== Estate ==
Most of the Töre are descendants of Tuqa-Timur, a smaller part are Shaybanids.

Töre ruled the Kazakh Khanate throughout its history and, by the right of the descendants of Genghis Khan, had a number of privileges: the title of sultan (a khan was elected from among the sultans), possession of a feudal inheritance. Töre are also not part of any of the zhuzes.

== Genetics ==
Most Kazakh Tore people (36%) belong to the haplogroup C2; 25% belong to R2a; 18% belong to R1a1a*; 7% to J1*; 4% to C2b1a2, G1, O2a2b1, Q*, and O2a2b1.

According to a study using molecular genealogy, Y-chromosome haplotypes from the Lu clan in northwestern China, who controversially claim to be descendants of Genghis Khan’s sixth son, Toghan, is mostly hypothesized belong to the Y-chromosome haplogroup C2b1a1b1-F1756. This haplogroup is widely distributed among Altaic-speaking populations and is closely related to the Tore clan from Kazakhstan, who claim descent from Genghis Khan’s first son, Jochi. The most recent common ancestor of the haplotype cluster, which includes the Lu and Tore clans, lived about 1000 years ago. Members of the Huo and Tuo clans, who, according to oral tradition, were close male relatives of the Lu clan, do not share common Y-chromosome lines with the Lu clan. Therefore, the haplogroup C2b1a1b1-F1756 may be another possible candidate for the true Y-chromosome lineage of Genghis Khan, but without direct evidence from Genghis Khan, this remains a hypothesis.

A 2018 study that used whole-Y-chromosome sequencing questioned the idea that the C2*-Star Cluster was the male line of Genghis Khan and analysed 18,210 individuals from 292 populations belonging to the C2*-Star Cluster (C2b1a3a1-F3796) and discovered the origin of the populations with high frequency of C2*-Star Cluster have a recent common ancestor about 2,576 years ago (95% confidence interval: 1,975–3,178 years). This is much earlier than the time of Genghis Khan. And was consistent with the spread and Migration of Mongolic-speaking people rather than with Genghis Khan or his male relatives. The authors therefore noted that the C2*-Star Cluster is a one of the founder paternal lineages of Mongolic speaking populations, but there is no proof that the C2*-Star Cluster is linked to Genghis Khan, and noted it is still not clear what Y-chromosome group Genghis Khan belonged, and called for testing of more well documented male-line descendants.

== Family Tree ==
Family tree of Tore

1. Temüjin (Chinggis Khan)

- 1. Jöchi
  - 2. Tuka-Timur
    - 3. Urang-Timur (Urungtash)
      - 4. Achik
        - 5. Bakubuka (Baktuk)
          - 6. Timur-Khodja
            - 7. Badik (Badik, Badak)
              - 8. Uros-khan — Khan of the Golden Horde (1372—1374, 1375)
                - 9. Toktakiya — Khan of the White Horde (1376—1377)
                  - 10. Bolat
                    - 11. Ahmet Kerey — First Kazakh Khan (1465—1474), one of the founders of the Kazakh Khanate
                      - 12. Burunduk-khan — Kazakh Khan (1474/1480—1511)
                        - 13. Shaykhim
                        - 13. Sanjar-Bakhti
                        - 13. Dzahan-Bakhti
                        - 13. Kemsin Sultan
                - 9. Koyrichak
                  - 10. Barak-khan — Khan of the Golden Horde (1423—1426, 1427—1428)
                    - 11. Abu Said Zhanibek — Kazakh Khan (1474—1480), one of the founders of the Kazakh Khanate
                      - 12. Irenji-Sultan — Ruler of Sauran in the 1470s
                      - 12. Mahmud Sultan — Ruler of Sazak (?-1476)
                      - 12. Muhammad Kasym-khan — Kazakh Khan (1511—1521)
                        - 13. Mamash-khan — Kazakh Khan (1521—1523)
                        - 13. Khak-Nazar Haydar khan — Kazakh Khan (1538—1580)
                          - 14. Dinmukhammed (Tynym) — Ruler of Tashkent (1600—1603)
                          - 14. Mangutay Sultan
                          - 14. Bozgyl Sultan
                          - 14. Ahmed Giray
                        - 13. Abulkhair-sultan
                        - 13. Zhalym-sultan
                          - 14. Tursun Muhammad-khan — Khan of the Senior Zhuz (1613—1627)
                            - 15. Shah Said-khan
                            - 15. Baki Sultan
                            - 15. Mukhamediyar
                      - 12. Adik-sultan
                        - 13. TahirAli Abdullah khan — Kazakh Khan (1523—1533)
                          - 14. Sulamish Khanzade
                        - 13. Buydash-khan — Kazakh Khan in Semirechye during the civil war in the Kazakh Khanate (1533—1538)
                        - 13. Baush — Kazakh Khan in Semirechye during the civil war (1533—1537)
                        - 13. Kozhash
                        - 13. Abulkasim
                      - 12. Janish-sultan
                        - 13. Ahmed Sultan
                      - 12. Tanish Sultan
                      - 12. Uzek
                        - 13. Bolat — died in 1519 during Khan Kasym's campaign against the Nogays
                        - 13. Bolekey
                          - 14. Batyr
                            - 15. Aishuak
                              - 16. Irish
                                - 17. Kazhi-sultan
                                  - 18. Tokhtamish
                                    - 19. Shemay
                                    - 19. Mamai (Sary Aygyr)
                                    - 19. Kylishkara
                                  - 18. Bulkayir
                                    - 19. Dussaly-sultan — cousin of the ruler of the Junior Zhuz Nuraly-khan, leader of the Kazakh tribes near the rivers Khobda and Ilek. During the Pugachev uprising.
                                  - 18. Abulkhair-khan (Junior Zhuz) — Khan of the Junior Zhuz (1718—1748)
                                    - 19. Nuraly — Khan of the Khiva Khanate (1741—1742), Khan of the Junior Zhuz from the Russian Empire (1748—1786)
                                      - 20. Orman
                                        - 21. Kusepghali — Kazakh Sultan of the Junior Zhuz.
                                      - 20. Esim-khan (Junior Zhuz) — Khan of the Junior Zhuz from the Russian Empire (1796—1797)
                                      - 20. Bukey — Khan of the Bukey Horde (1812—1815)
                                        - 21. Tauke
                                          - 22. Nurmukhammed
                                            - 23. Gabdulkhakim Nurmukhamedovich Bukeykhanov — Kazakh statesman and public figure, descendant of Khan Bukey.
                                            - 23. Makhambet Nurmukhameduly Bokeykhanov (1890—1937) — kuyshi-composer.
                                        - 21. Adil Bukeyev — Chairman of the Council on the Governance of Bukey Horde (1845—1854)
                                          - 22. Myrzageriy
                                            - 23. Nausha Myrzagerievich Bokeykhanov (1870—1944) — Kazakh dombrist, kuyshi.
                                        - 21. Zhanjir-Kerey-khan — Khan of the Bukey Horde (1815/1823—1845)
                                          - 22. Sultan Akhmet-Kerey Dzhangerovich Bukeyev (1834—1914)
                                          - 22. Ibrahim Dzhangerovich Bukeyev (1833—1865)
                                          - 22. Sahib-Kerey — Last Khan of the Bukey Horde (1845—1849)
                                          - 22. Gubaydulla Chingiskhan (1840—1909) — Military commander, General of Cavalry
                                        - 21. Mendikeray Bokeykhanov (1808—1868)
                                      - 20. Shigay-khan (Junior Zhuz) — Regent of the Bukey Horde (1815—1823)
                                        - 21. Dauletkeray (1820—1887) — Composer-kuishi.
                                      - 20. Karatay-khan — Khan of the Junior Zhuz (1806—1816)
                                        - 21. Bisali Karataev
                                          - 22. ?
                                            - 23. Davletjan Karataev
                                              - 24. Bakhytjan Karataev
                                        - 21. Meraly
                                          - 22. Mukhit Meralyuly
                                            - 23. Shon (Muhammedjan)
                                              - 24. Lukpan Mukhitov
                                    - 19. Eraly-khan — Khan of the Junior Zhuz from the Russian Empire (1791—1794)
                                      - 20. Bolekey — Khan of the Khiva Khanate (1770)
                                    - 19. Aishuak-khan — Khan of the Junior Zhuz from the Russian Empire (1797—1805)
                                      - 20. Sygalyi (Syugaly) Sultan
                                        - 21. Asfendiary Sultan
                                          - 22. Seidzhapar (Graduates of the Military-Medical Academy).
                                            - 23. Sandjar Dzhafarovich Asfendiarov — Military doctor, statesman (People's Commissar of Health, People's Commissar of Agriculture of the Turkestan ASSR, People's Commissar of Health of the Kazakh SSR), academician; Professor.
                                      - 20. Zhantore-khan — Khan of the Junior Zhuz from the Russian Empire (1805—1809)
                                        - 20. Arystan Zanturin — Kazakh Sultan of the Junior Zhuz.
                                      - 20. Shergazy-khan — Last Khan of the Junior Zhuz from the Russian Empire (1812—1824)
                                      - 20. Baymukhamed — Ruler of the Zhetyru Clan (1815 —?)
                                        - 21. Baymukhametov, Mukhambetjan — Senior Sultan of the Middle part of the Junior Zhuz (1855—1869)
                      - 12. Zhadik-sultan
                        - 13. Tugum-khan — Kazakh Khan during the civil war (1533—1537)
                        - 13. Shigay-khan (Kazakh Khanate) — Kazakh Khan (1580—1582)
                          - 14. Seidkul
                            - 15. Kudainazar
                          - 14. Ali Sultan (Zhanali?)
                          - 14. Sulum Sultan
                          - 14. Ibrahim Sultan
                          - 14. Shah-Muhammad Sultan
                          - 14. Abu Said Sultan
                          - 14. Ondan
                            - 15. Uraz-Muhammad — Khan of the Kasimov Khanate (1600—1610)

== Genealogy of House of Urus ==
House of Borjigin

Mongol Empire
Golden Horde
Blue Horde (Debatable)
Qasim Khanate
Kazakh Khanate
Senior Zhuz
Middle Zhuz
Junior Zhuz
Khiva Khanate
Bukay Horde
Alash Autonomy

Temüjin r. 1206–1227
Jochi r. 1225–1227
Tuqa-Timur
Urung-Timur
Achiq
Taqtaq
Timur-Khwaja
Badiq
Urus r. 1368–1377 r. 1373–1373, 1374–1375
Tuqtaqiya r. 1377–1377	Timur-Malik r. 1377–1378	Quyurchuq r. 1395–1395
Beg-Pulad r. 1391–1392	Anika-Pulad	Baraq r. 1419–1428
Giray r. 1465–1473	Jani-Beg I r. 1473–1480
Burunduq r. 1480–1511	Qasim I r. 1511–1521	Adik	Janish	Jadik	Usak
Mamash r. 1521–1523	Haqq-Nazar r. 1538–1580	Tahir I r. 1523–1533	Bauish r. 1528–1533	Buydash r. 1533–1538	Ahmad r. 1533–1535	Tughum r. 1533–1537	Shighay r. 1580–1582	Bulakay
Andan	Tawakkul r. 1582–1598	Ishim I r. 1598–1628	Bahadur I r. 1652–1680	Aychuwaq
Uraz-Muhammad r. 1600–1610	Kichik	Jani-Beg II r. 1628–1643	Jahangir r. 1643–1652	Sartaq	Irish
Bukay	Tawka r. 1680–1715	Wali	Khusraw	Aytaq-Hajji
Khudabanda	Pulad r. 1718–1729	Sameke r. 1718–1734	Aytaq	Abuli	Qayip r. 1715–1718	Abu'l-Khayr r. 1718–1748	Tuqtamish
Tursun	Abu'l-Muhammad r. 1734–1771 r. 1741–1771	Sa'id	Ishim	Kart-Abu'l-Khayr r. 1718–1730	Yulbars r. 1730–1740	Wali	Bahadur II r. 1728–1728 r. 1748–1771	Nur-Ali I r. 1741–1742 r. 1748–1786	Ir-Ali r. 1791–1794	Yar-Muhammad r. 1786–1791	Aychuwaq r. 1797–1805	Adil	Mamay r. 1728–1728
Kichik r. 1718–1748	Baraq r. 1748–1750	Abu'l-Fayd r. 1771–1774	Tawka r. 1764–1764	Qara-Bash	Khudabanda	Abu'l-Fath r. 1740–1750	Ablai r. 1756–1771 r. 1771–1781 r. 1771–1781	Qayip r. 1747–1757	Qara-Beg r. 1757–1758	Ishim II r. 1790–1791, 1796–1797	Bukay r. 1812–1815	Shighay r. 1815–1823	Qaratay r. 1806–1816	Bulakay r. 1770–1770	Jan-Tura I r. 1805–1809	Shir-Ghazi r. 1812–1824	Aqim r. 1770–1771, 1772–1772
Tahir II r. 1781–1784	Bukay r. 1815–1819	Nur-Ali II r. 1768–1769	Taghay r. 1809–1826	Juma-Jan r. 1817–1819	Wali r. 1781–1819	Qasim II r. 1806–1809	Adil r. 1774–1781	Abu'l-Ghazi III r. 1767–1768 r. 1791–1806	Jahangir r. 1769–1770	Abdul-Aziz r. 1771–1771	Abu'l-Fayd r. 1775–1779	Jahangir r. 1823–1845
Chinghiz r. 1819–1822	Bahadur	Ubaydullah r. 1819–1822	Kana-Shirin r. 1841–1847	Harun-Ghazi r. 1816–1821	Jan-Tura II r. 1817–1819	Sahib r. 1845–1847
Mirzatay
Nur-Muhammad
Alikhan Bukaykhan r. 1917–1920
