= Orda =

Orda may refer to:

- Orda (organization), a historical sociopolitical and military structure of Mongol Eurasia
- Orda Khan, a 13th-century Mongol Khan
- Orda (rural locality), several rural localities in Russia
- Olympic Regional Development Authority (ORDA), a public benefit corporation in New York, United States
- Orda, Hungarian name of urdă, a whey cheese

== See also ==
- Ordu (disambiguation)
- Horde (disambiguation)
