= Zheti Zhargy =

Set of laws in the Kazakh Khanate

- Native name: Жеті Жарғы
- Enacted by: Tauke Khan
- Date enacted: c. 1680–1718
- Jurisdiction: Kazakh Khanate
- Status: Historical

The Zheti Zhargy (also transliterated as "Jeti Jarği", Kazakh: "Жеті Жарғы", lit. "Seven Charters") was the set of laws introduced in the Kazakh Khanate by Tauke Khan c. 1680 – 1718.

Zheti Zhargy consisted of the following 7 charters (Zhargy)

- 1st zhargy: Law of land (Kazakh: Жер дауы), it regulated land disputes, which was important for nomadic people, who relied on grazing for sustenance and profit
- 2nd zhargy: Family law, according to Rafail Zinurov, it was primarily based on muslim Shari'a law and regulated family life, rules of divorce and responsibility distribution among spouses. It also instituted the marriage ban for people who are related up to the seventh generation
- 3rd zhargy: Military law, it regulated matters of recruitment, levies, election of commanders and service conditions
- 4th zhargy: Judicial law, which regulated norms of and conditions of taking to court, judicial decisions and rules high profile cases that sometimes required their own Kurultais to make a ruling
- 5th zhargy: Criminal law, it regulated punishments for all crime except murder, since Zheti Zhargy didn't differentiate between criminal and civil (private) law. If the convicted hasn't paid the fine, the entire community would have to pay it. In that case, convicted's clan had a right to punish him however they saw fit
- 6th zhargy: Law of Kun, it regulated punishments for murder and bodily harm. Kun (Kazakh:. Құн) was a price murderer or his clan had to pay for the act to the clan the murdered belonged to, otherwise the victim's clan had grounds to seek revenge. The murder of common member cost 1000 sheep, murder of a common woman cost 500 sheep, death of sultan demanded the kun worth of 7 men, insult to the sultan or Khoja cost 9 sheep, convesrion to christianity was grounds for confiscation of property. Blasphemy was punishable by death, execution method was stoning
- 7th zhargy: Widow law (Kazakh: Жесір дауы), it regulated property and personal rights of widows and orphans as well as their status in society. It also regulated responsibilities community members and relatives of the late husband had in supporting widows and orphans
