= Orda (rural locality) =

Orda (Russian: Орда) is the name of several rural localities in Russia:

- Orda, Perm Krai, a selo in Ordinsky District of Perm Krai
- Orda, Tver Oblast, a village in Vesyegonsky District of Tver Oblast
- Orda, Yaroslavl Oblast, a village in Poshekhonsky District of Yaroslavl Oblast
