= Kasym Khan =

Khan of the Kazakh Khanate from c. 1511 to 1518/21

Qasim Khan قاسم خان Қасым хан
- Khan; Khanzada; Sultan

Khan of the Kazakh Khanate
- Reign: 1511–1518 or 1521
- Coronation: 1511-1513
- Predecessor: Burunduk Khan
- Successor: Muhammed Khan
- Born: 1445 or 1455
- Died: 1518 or 1521; Saray-Jük, Kazakh Khanate
- Spouse: Khanyk Sultan Khanum; Sultan Nigar Khanum
- Issue: Muhammed Khan; Haqnazar Khan; Abulkhair Sultan
Names
- محمد قاسم بن جانی بک خان; Muhammad Qasım bin Jänibek Khan
- House: House of Borjigin
- Dynasty: Töre; House of Urus Khan
- Father: Janibek Khan
- Mother: Jagan-bigim Khanim
- Religion: Sunni Islam

Muhammad Qasim bin Janibek Khan (Kazakh: محمد قاسم بن جانی بک خان, Мухаммед Қасым бин Жәнібек хан, romanized: Qasym bin Jänıbek Han), known by his shortened regal name as Qasim Khan (also spelled as Kasym Khan) was a son of Janibek Khan. He ruled as the fourth Khan of the Kazakh Khanate from about 1511 to 1521. He is viewed as the greatest leader to unite the Kazakh tribes. Although, Burunduk Khan was the Khan of the Kazakhs, the control of the government was in the hands of Qasim Khan. Eventually, he sent Burunduk Khan into exile who died in Samarkand. Qasim Khan had a brother named Adik Khan who was married to Sultana Nigar Khanim, daughter of Yunus Khan of Moghulistan. When Adik Khan died, Qasim Khan took her as his wife.Qasim Khan is generally regarded as one of the greatest rulers of the Kazakh Khanate. Shortly after taking the throne in 1510, Qasim Khan fought against his cousin Muhammad Shaybani for control of the Desht-i-Kipchak region. After Shaybani and the Uzbeks suffered severe losses in numerous battles near Lake Balkhash, the Uzbek Khanate agreed to give Qasim Khan and the Kazakhs all former Uzbek lands north of the Syr Darya. This effectively allowed Qasim Khan to conquer all of modern Kazakhstan, much of modern-day Uzbekistan, and parts of southwestern Siberia, western China, and Kyrgyzstan. The Kazakh Khanate consistently controlled of all of these lands until the 18th century, when they began suffering attacks from the Tsardom of Russia in the north, the Emirate of Bukhara to the south, and the Dzungars in the east.

After his conquests against Muhammad Shaybani, Qasim began to advance the power of the Kazakh state for the long term. He is credited with creating the first written code of laws for the Kazakhs, which he called "The Bright Road of Qasim Khan" as well as creating some of the first written records of the Kazakh language, which used the Arabic script until the early 20th century.

Qasim Khan, a devout Muslim himself, was also a proponent of Islamic culture and a patron of the arts. Under his reign, all inhabitants of modern-day Kazakhstan fully adopted Sunni Islam, which had begun spreading throughout the Desht-i-Kipchak steppe in the 13th century but only became firmly established under him and the Shaybanid rulers before him. Mirza Muhammad Haidar Dughlat, the Kazakh Chagatayid governor of Kashmir, wrote extensively about Qasim's success in the Tarikh-i-Rashidi. With the relatively notable exceptions of Ottoman Sultan Selim I and Safavid Shah Ismail I, Dughlat considered Qasim to be one of the most powerful rulers of the eastern Islamic world. Qasim oversaw the construction of numerous mosques and mausoleums, especially in northern Kazakhstan, many of which still stand today. Towards the end of his reign, Qasim built an alliance with the rising Timurid prince Babur, who shared a common enemy of Muhammad Shaybani with him.

Qasim had three sons by his two wives: Khanzada Abu'l Khair was born to Sultan Nigar Khanum, while Khanzada Haqnazar and Khanzada Muhammed were born to Khanyk Sultan Khanum. Since he was the oldest, Khanzada Muhammed ultimately succeeded his father as khan, followed by Haqnazar long after him.

== See also ==
- Kazakh people
- Muhammad Shaybani
- Babur

Preceded by Burunduk Khan	Khan of the Kazakhs; 1511–1521	Succeeded by Mamash Khan
