= Kazakh Khanate =

1465–1847 Turkic state in Central Asia

Kazakh Khanate قزاق یورتی (Chagatay) قزاق جورتی (Early Kazakh) (Note: This spelling was used in the later stages of the local Kipchak dialects on the Kazakh steppe)
- 1465–1780
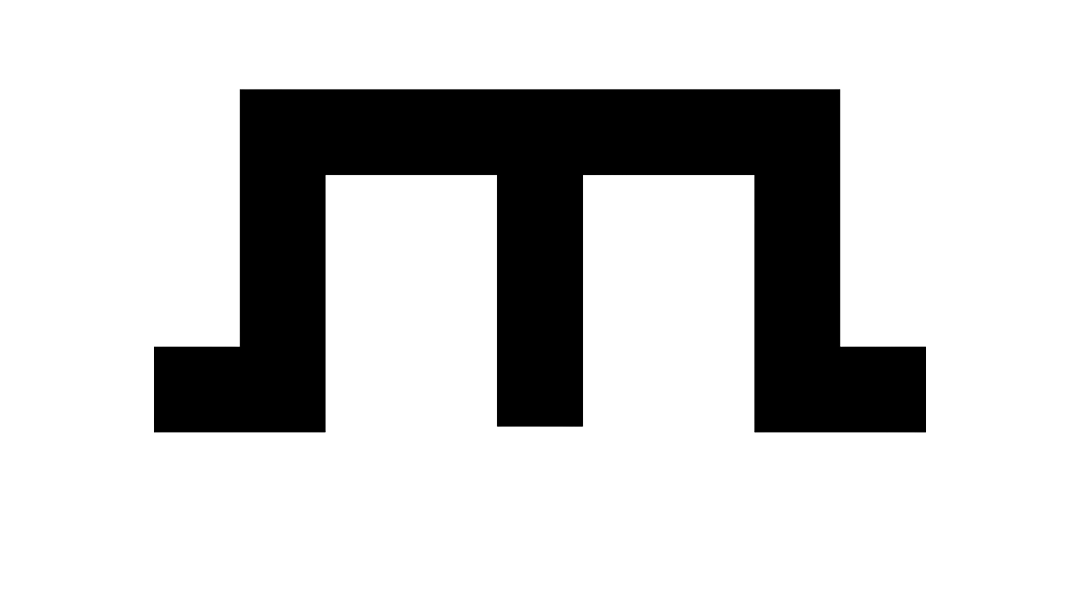
- Tamga of the Töre dynasty

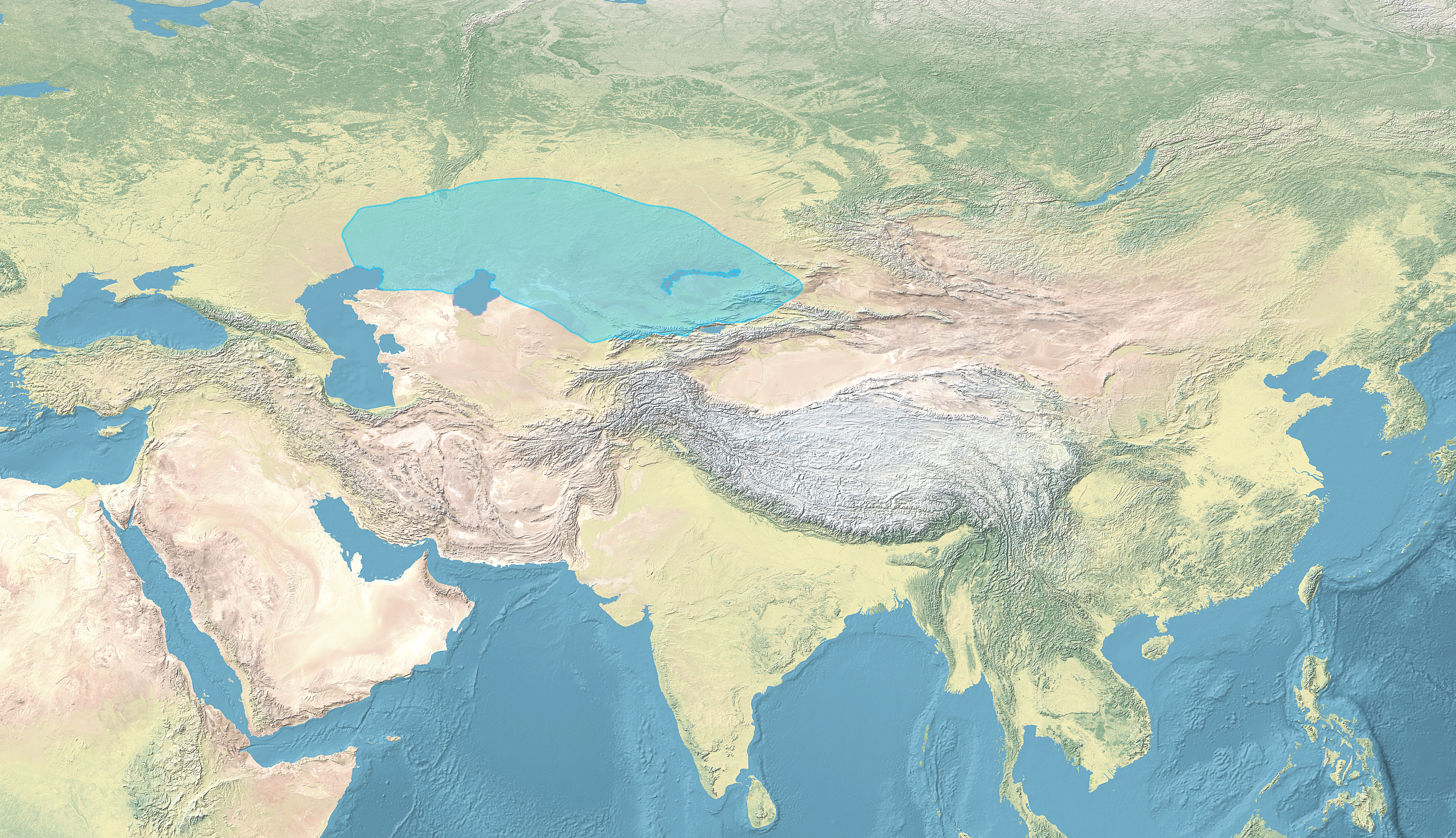
- Territory of the Kazakh Khanate in the beginning of 16th century
- Status: Nomadic empire
- Capital: Saraishyq (1508–1511/1513); Turkistan (1599–1781); Tashkent (1759–1781)
- Common languages: Kipchak dialects (Kazakh); Chagatai; Oirat
- Religion: Sunni Islam
- Demonym: Kazakh
- Government: Semi-elective monarchy
- Khan
  - 1465–1480: Kerei Khan (first)
  - 1771–1781: Ablai Khan (last)
- History
  - Established: 1465
  - Disestablished: 1780
Preceded by
Golden Horde
Uzbek Khanate
Moghulistan
Succeeded by
Russian Empire

The Kazakh Khanate (Note: Chagatai Turkic: قزاق یورتی, romanized: Qazāq yūrtï̄ Late Kipchak/Early Kazakh: قزاق جورتی, romanized: Qazāq jūrtï̄ Kazakh: Қазақ хандығы, Qazaq handyğy), also known as the Kazakh Khanates or Qazaq Khanate was a nomadic state in Central Asia that existed from c. 1465 to the early 19th century. It emerged after the fragmentation of the Golden Horde.

By the end of the 15th century and throughout the 16th century, the Kazakhs consolidated their political power and established control over the vast steppe territories east of the Caspian Sea and north of the Aral Sea, extending as far as the upper reaches of the Irtysh River and the western foothills of the Altai Mountains. During the reigns of Burunduk Khan and Kasym Khan, the Kazakhs came to control nearly the entire steppe region. A widely held view is that the reign of Kasym Khan marked the beginning of an independent Kazakh state. Under his rule, Kazakh authority extended from the territory of present-day southeastern Kazakhstan to the Ural Mountains.

In the 17th–18th centuries, the Khanate experienced a period of sharp decline, and centralized authority among the Kazakhs weakened or effectively disappeared amid the rise of numerous small local rulers. After the death of Tauke Khan, the khanate, in effect, split into three independent khanates. The Kazakh Khanate was the first chronologically established nation-state in Central Asia created by the modern ethnic group itself rather than its predecessors or historical ancestors, and it existed until the early 19th century, longer than other post-Jochid states.

== Name ==
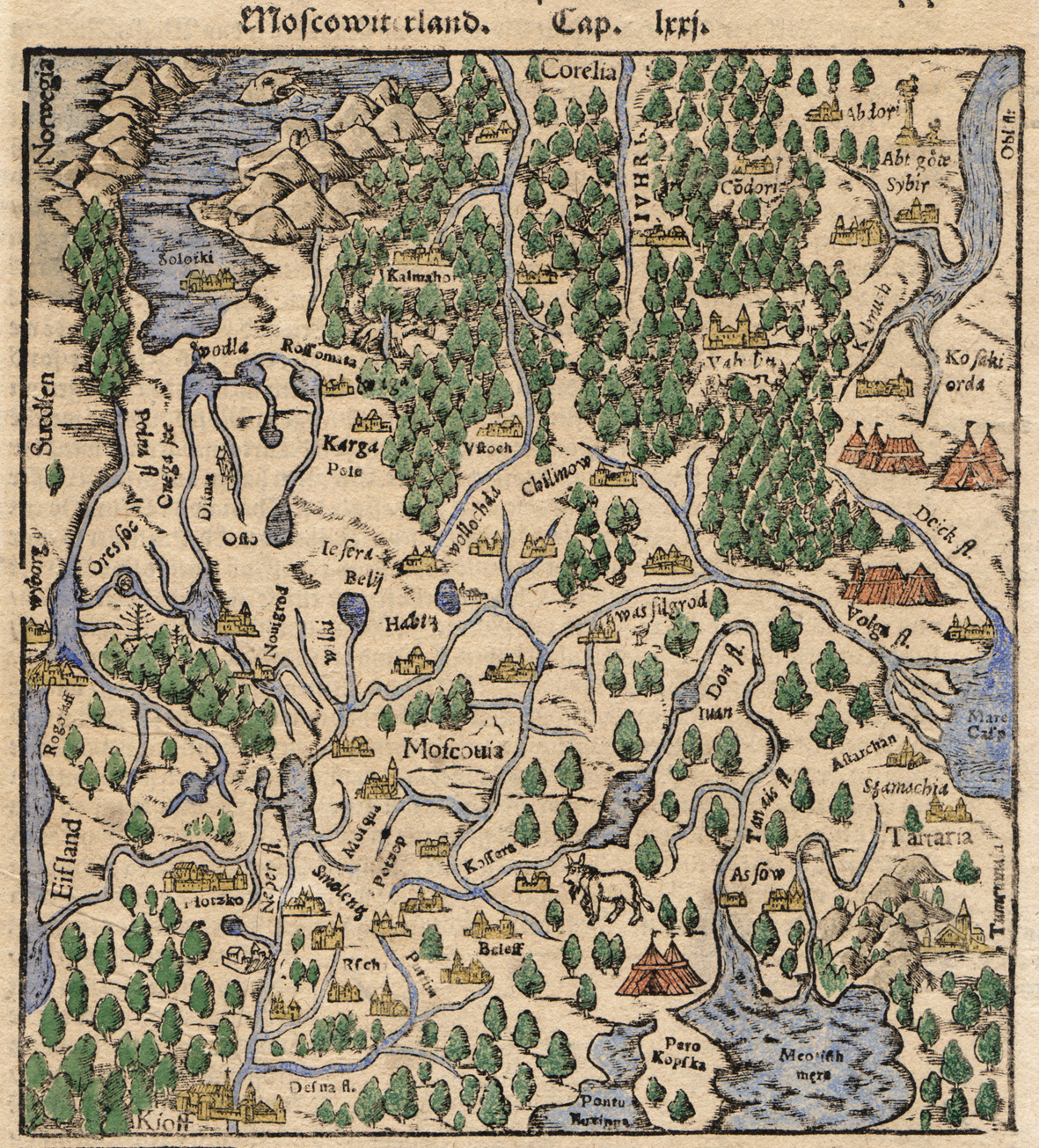
Kosaki Orda (Kazakh Khanate) on Sebastian Münster's map, published in 1600

In Eastern sources, one encounters such names as Ulus of the Kazakhs, Kazakh Ulus, Kazakh El-Ulus, the yurt of the Urus, (i.e., of Urus Khan), Barak’s tsarev Kazatck yurt, (i.e., of Barak Khan), Ulus of Jochi, or the earlier geographical term Desht-i-Kipchak The name 'Kazakhstan' (Persian: قزاقستان) is also attested. In Russian sources of the 15th century, the designations Kazatskaya Orda, Kazatskaya Horde, and Kazachya Orda were used; in the 18th century, the term Kirgiz-Kaisak Horde appears.

In 16th-century Mongolian sources, the Jochid Ulus and the Kazakhs are referred to by the term Togmak or Toγ Maγ. In European sources, the names Kozaksche Orda, Kassachy Horda, Kasaki Orda, and Casatschia Orda, Casatschia Orda were used.

Eastern authors of the 15th–16th centuries often referred to the Kazakh Khanate by the region it occupied Desht-i-Kipchak, or Tatar Ulus/Uzbek Ulus as the Golden Horde was named after the population inhabiting it. Central Asian authors of this period collectively called the Kazakhs, the Shaybanids, and the Nogais Uzbeks, in honor of the Golden Horde khan Özbeg Khan, while European authors knew the population of the Ulus of Jochi as "Tatars".

=== Issues with the date of the khanate's establishment ===
There is no consensus among medieval historians regarding the place and time of the formation of the early Kazakh Khanate. Russian historiography follows the dating proposed by Tursun Sultanov. He considers the death of Abulkhair-khan in 875 AH (1470–1471) as the date of the formation of the Kazakh Khanate.

In Kazakh historiography, the year 1465 is commonly accepted as the date of the establishment of the Kazakh Khanate. This date is mentioned in the work of the medieval author Muhammad Haidar Dughlat Tarikh-i Rashidi.

In the 17th century, three separate orda (horde), or zhuz, emerged: the Senior (Greater), Middle (Central), and Junior, each with its own territory for nomadic movements. After the death of Khan Tauke in 1715 or 1718, the zhuzes essentially became independent khanates. Thus, the history of the Kazakh Khanate ends and the history of the Kazakh Khanates begins.

Ablai Khan was able to reunite all Kazakhs and skillfully navigated his politics between Russia and China, but after his death in 1781, the khanate once again fractured into three zhuzs, whose khans were appointed by the Russian government. In 1822–1824, the institution of the Khanate in the Russian Empire was abolished by the Statutes concerning the Siberian and Orenburg Kazakhs.

The abolition of the khan's power led to the uprising of Sultan Kasym in 1824–1827. The last attempt to restore khan's authority in the territory of the Kazakh zhuzs was made by Sultan Kenesary Qasymuly, whose rebellion against Russian authorities began in 1837. He declared himself khan and waged armed struggle with varying success until his death in 1847.

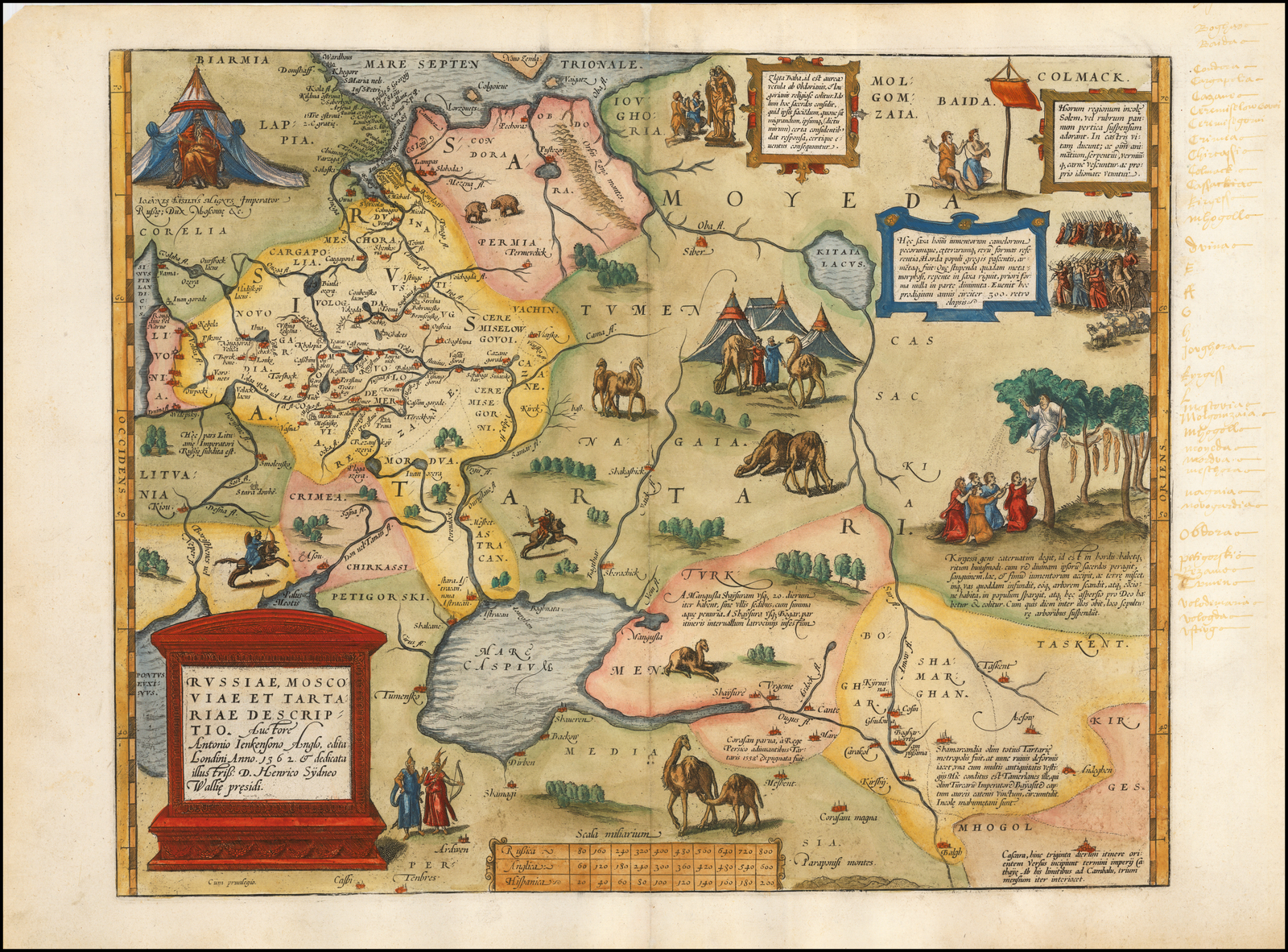
Cassakia, Anthony Jenkinson, Abraham Ortelius, 1570

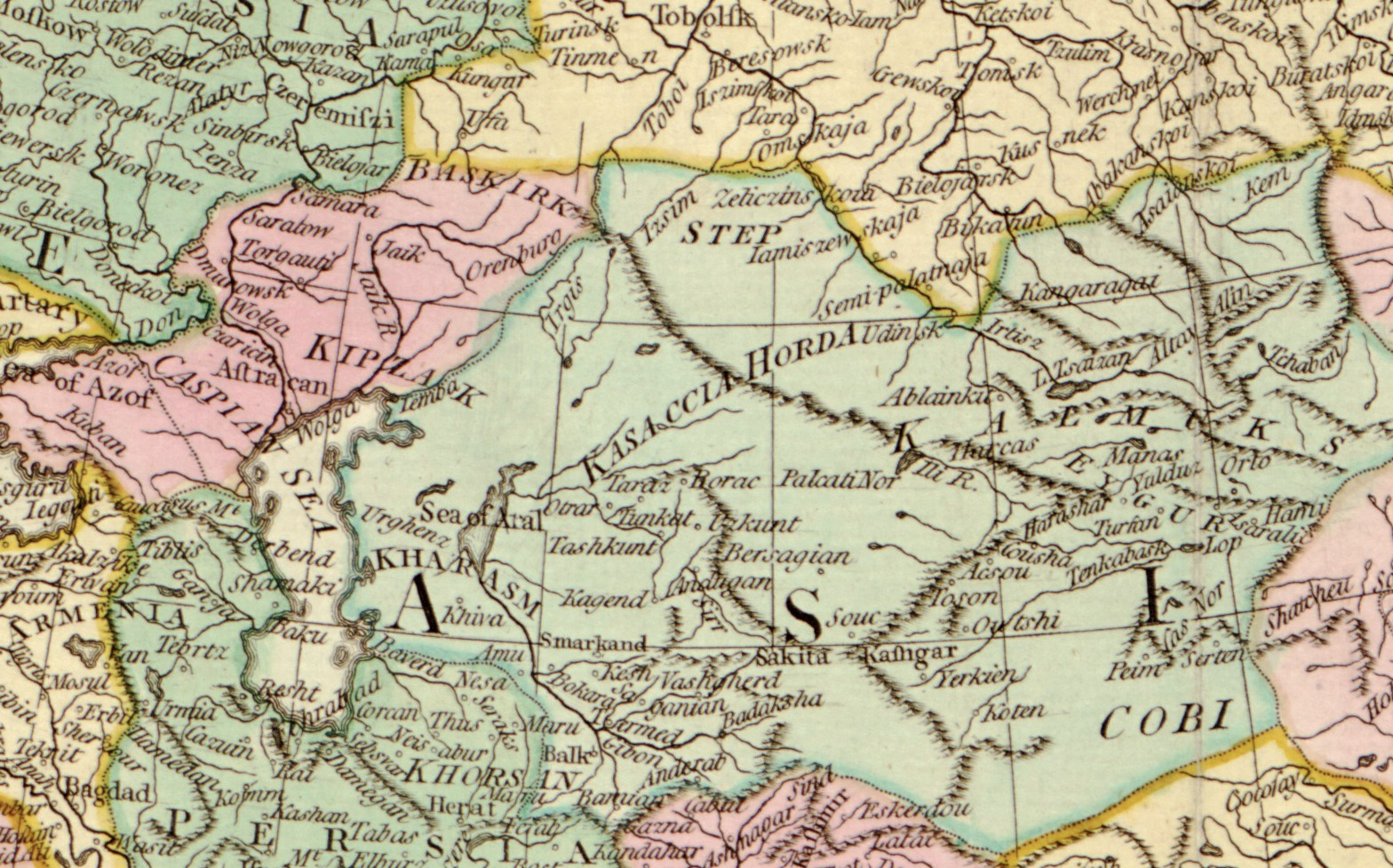
Kasaccia Horda, Carrington, 1780

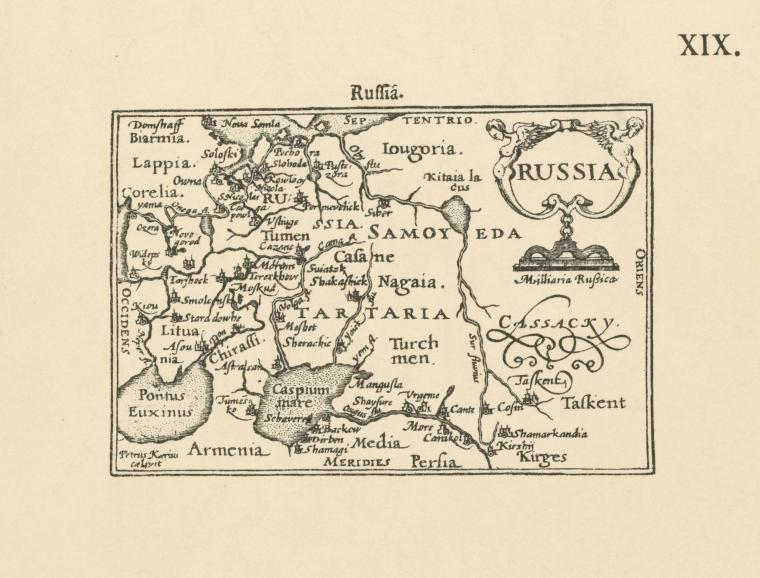
Cassacky, Anthony Jenkinson, 1598

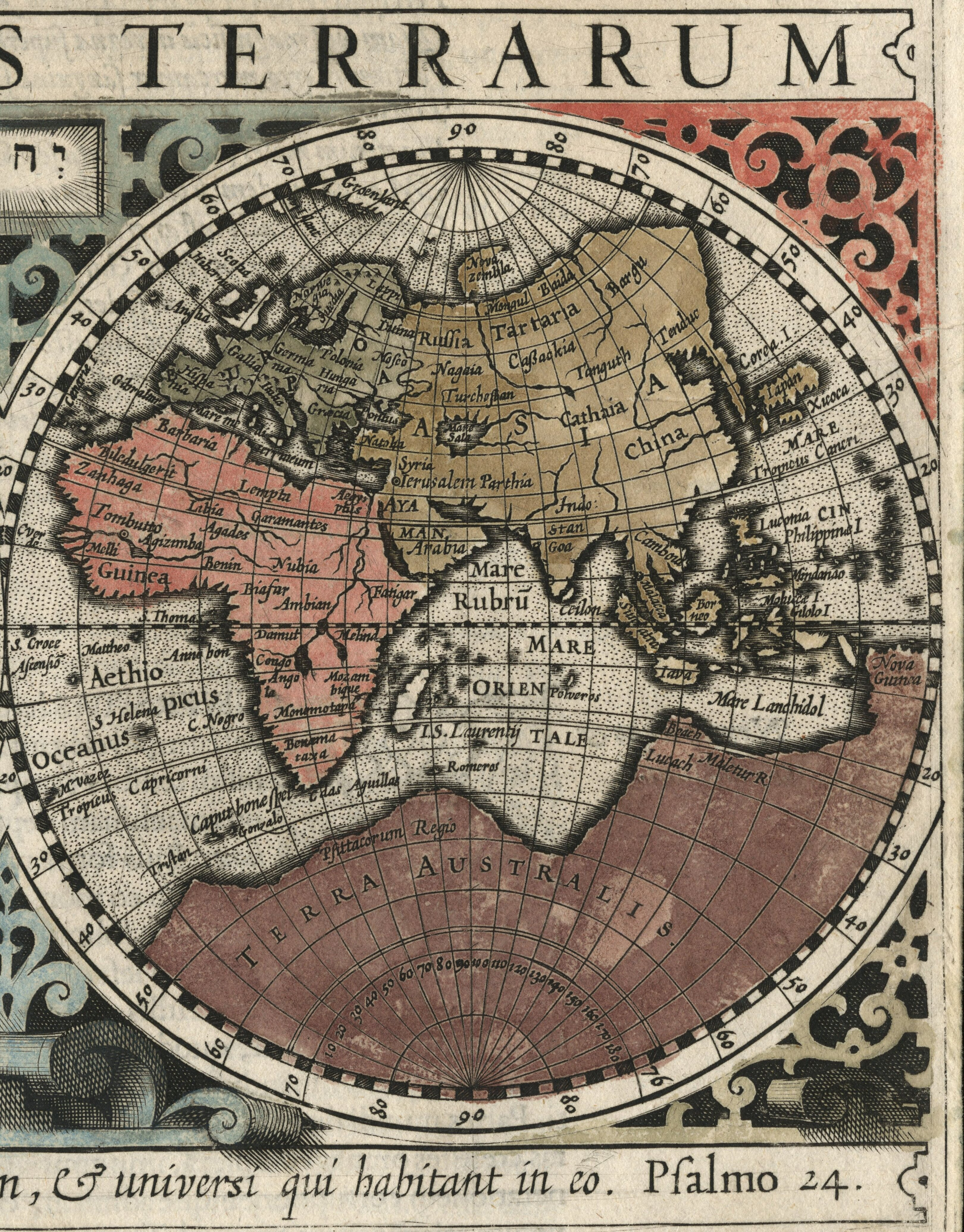
Caßackia, Janssonius, 1607

== History ==
=== Background ===
The Kazakh Khanate was formed as a result of the disintegration of the Golden Horde, or Ulus of Jochi, which had originally been a ulus of the Mongol Empire.

==== Ulus of Jochi within the Mongol Empire ====
In 1206, Genghis Khan was proclaimed the ruler of all the Mongols. The following year, at his command, his eldest son Jochi subjugated the tribes of Tuva, Khakassia, and the Altai Mountains. These newly conquered lands and peoples were assigned to Jochi as an ulus in 1207 (or 1208). The core of Jochi's ulus consisted of the Mongol tribes of Sijiut, Kinggit, and Khushin. Between 1207 and 1211, the Oirats, Yenisei Kyrgyz, Uriankhai, and later other Turkic-Kipchak and Mongol tribes that acknowledged the authority of the empire were incorporated into the ulus. A second grant of territory to Jochi took place in 1224, when he received the northern part of Khwarazm (the lower reaches of the Amu Darya) and the eastern Dasht-i Qipchaq as his appanage. Jochi resettled there all the 'ils' (tribes) that had been granted to him by his father. The capital of the ulus was initially located on the Irtysh before being transferred to the Dasht-i Qipchaq. Following the annexation of Khwarazm, the Ulus of Jochi expanded westward as far as the Ural River.

After Jochi's death in 1227, his ulus passed, in accordance with Genghis Khan's decree, to Jochi's eldest sons, Orda and Batu. As the elder brother, Orda was expected to inherit the throne but renounced his claim in favor of Batu. Orda received the Irtysh region as his appanage, while Batu was assigned the still unconquered western territories. Between 1236 and 1242, the empire-wide Kipchak Campaign resulted in the extension of the Ulus of Jochi over the western Dasht-i Qipchaq. Following this expansion, the administration of the western and eastern parts of the ulus was separated at Batu's initiative. The permanent center of the western wing of the Ulus of Jochi became the city of Bolghar. Batu himself settled in the Volga region, while Orda's headquarters were located in eastern Kazakhstan, between the Tarbagatai Mountains and the upper reaches of the Irtysh. The Yaik River became the boundary between the two de facto autonomous khanates.

==== The Eastern wing of the Ulus of Jochi ====
Blue Horde was inhabited primarily by Turkic and Mongol steppe tribes, including the Kipchaks and Kangly who had lived there before the Mongol conquest, as well as the Naimans, Keraites, Karluks, Khongirats, Merkits, Jalayir, and Tatars who had accompanied Genghis Khan's Mongols. The boundaries between the appanages of the Jochids were defined only in broad terms and changed according to the prevailing military and political situation. During the second half of the 13th century, the capital of the Kok Horde became the city of Sighnaq on the Syr Darya.

The eastern wing (züüngar) of the Ulus of Jochi was itself divided into the *barüngar* (the appanage of the Shibanids) and the züüngar (the appanage of the khan of the Blue Horde). In the 14th century, the possessions of the Shibanids encompassed the middle Irtysh region. The khan's domain consisted of the appanages of five sons of Jochi—Orda, Udur, Tuqa-Timur, Shingkum, and Singkum.

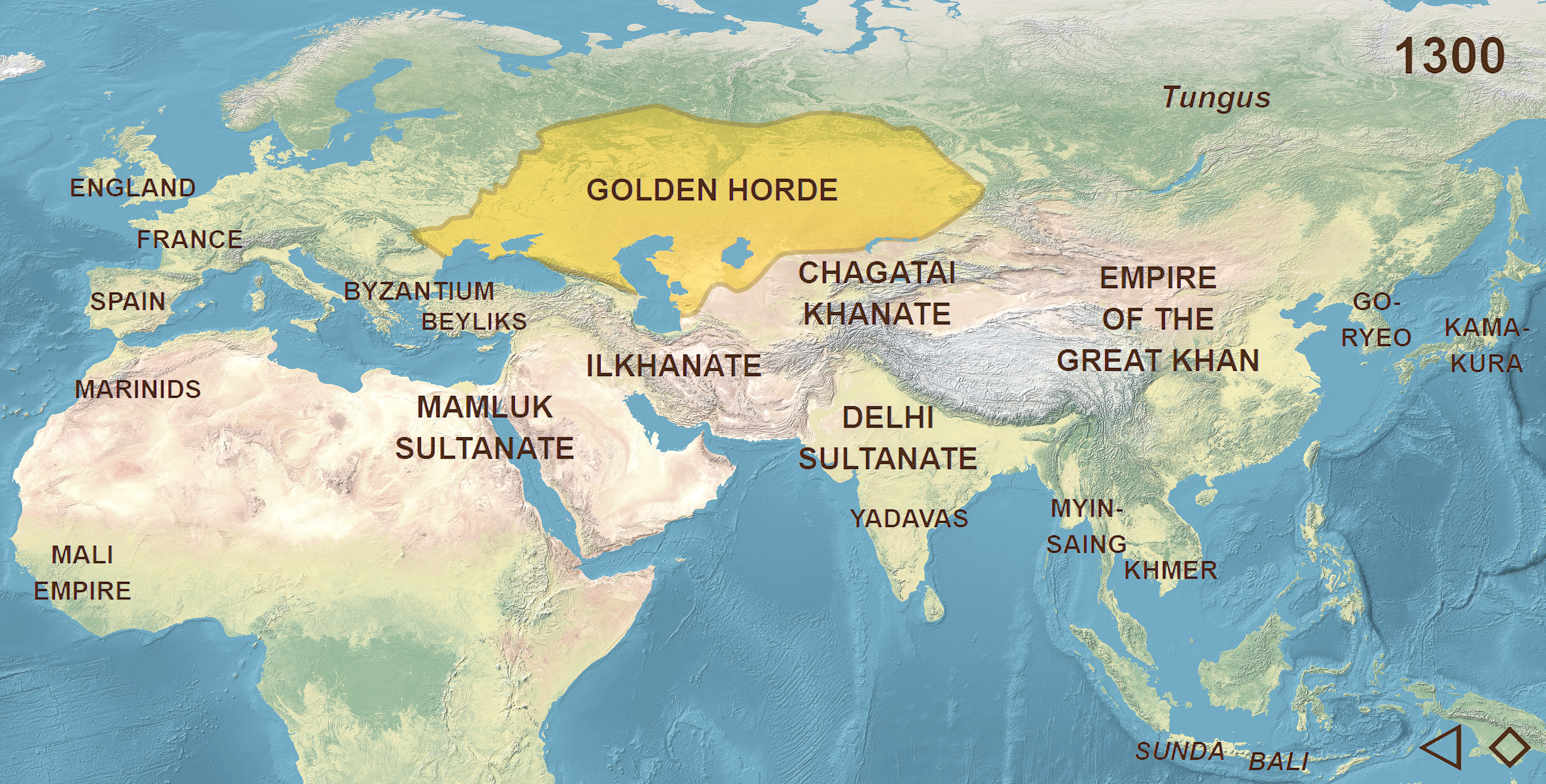
Map of the Golden Horde, c. 1300

Following the death of Jani Beg in 1357, the Golden Horde entered a period of political turmoil. Several claimants competed for the throne, each issuing his own coinage. During this period, the Kok Horde became de facto independent. Its khans took an active part in the struggle for the throne at Sarai. Beginning in 1361, descendants of Orda from the Kok Horde ascended to the throne of the Golden Horde, including Timur Khwaja, Orda Shaykh, and Murid.

In 1361, Urus became khan of the Kok Horde. Under his rule, royal authority was strengthened, and he sought to seize the throne at Sarai. In 1368, he began campaigns against Sarai, capturing it in 1374–1375. He also besieged Hajji Tarkhan (Astrakhan) and subdued the Kama region. However, a year later he was forced to withdraw from the Volga region to the eastern Dasht-i Qipchaq, unable to defeat the powerful Golden Horde warlord Mamai.

In 1378, the young Mangyshlak prince Tokhtamysh, a descendant of Tuqa-Timur, the youngest son of Jochi, was installed as khan at Sighnaq with the support of the Samarqand amir Timur. Backed by Timur, Tokhtamysh campaigned westward and captured Sarai, the capital of the Golden Horde. He soon reunited all the dominions of the Jochids into a single empire and restored strong central authority. However, Tokhtamysh subsequently came into conflict with Timur and was defeated in 1395. The defeat cost him the throne of the Golden Horde. He never returned to the Kok Horde and was killed ten years later near the lower Terek River in the North Caucasus. After Tokhtamysh, no ruler succeeded in establishing authority recognized throughout the entire Ulus of Jochi.

The Samarqand amir Timur installed his own nominees from the Kok Horde on the throne at Sarai, while the Kok Horde itself was effectively under his control. These rulers were primarily members of the house of Urus Khan, including Qoirichaq and Timur Qutlugh.

In 1428, Abu'l-Khayr Khan of the Shibanid dynasty became khan of the independent eastern wing of the former Ulus of Jochi. From this point, the state is referred to in historiography as the Abu'l-Khayr Khanate or the Uzbek Khanate. In European and Muslim sources, the population of the Mongol Empire and the Golden Horde, including the ancestors of the Kazakhs, had originally been referred to as "Tatars". From the 14th century onward, Timurid authors began using the term "Uzbek Ulus" to designate the eastern Dasht-i Qipchaq, when rulers from this eastern ulus, such as Urus and Tokhtamysh, came to rule the entire Golden Horde, the term was extended to its western territories as well. The Turkic-speaking tribes inhabiting the eastern Dasht-i Qipchaq gradually came to be known as Uzbeks. During the 1440s, the Manghit Yurt (Nogai Horde) separated from the Uzbek Khanate. Following the decline of the Shibanid dynasty, conditions emerged for the rise of another Jochid line—the descendants of Urus Khan. A number of 16th- and 17th-century authors did not distinguish between the periods of the Golden Horde and the Kazakh Khanate, referring to both Baraq Khan and his grandson Kasym Khan as rulers of the Ulus of Jochi.

The emergence of the Kazakh Khanate was preceded by intense struggles within the Ulus of Jochi, which unfolded among various Jochid dynasties in the 15th century, already during the time of Barak Khan, the grandson of the famous Urus Khan, and intensified after his death. Different descendants of Jochi Khan attempted to unite the nomadic tribes of the Eastern Desht-i Kipchak under their rule.

With the support of powerful Manghit beys, the young Shibanid Abu’l-Khayr emerged victorious in this struggle. In the following decades, during the 1420s–1450s, he subordinated most of the tribal confederations of the Eastern Desht-i Kipchak and significantly expanded the borders of his state. He also brought under his authority the hereditary domains of the descendants of Urus Khan in the Syr Darya region and around the city of Turkestan.

=== Formation ===
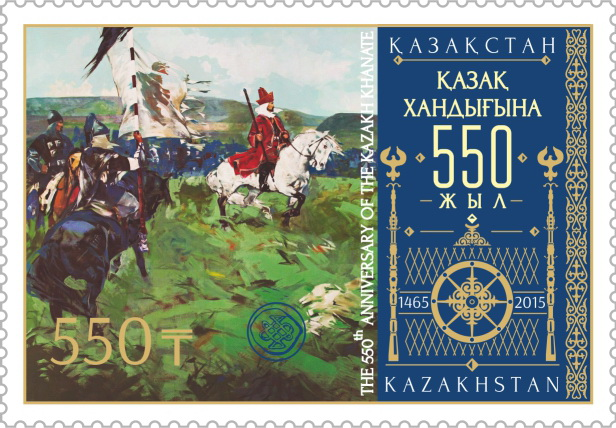
A 2015 Kazakhstani stamp commemorating the 550th anniversary of the Kazakh Khanate's establishment

The formation of the Kazakh Khanate was preceded by a struggle for supreme power in the Jochid Ulus during the 15th century. This struggle had already begun among various branches of the Jochid dynasty during the reign of Barak Khan, the grandson of the famous Urus Khan, and intensified following Barak's death. Various descendants of Jochi Khan sought to bring the nomads of Dasht-i Qipchaq, who were known in written sources as the "Uzbeks", under their control. With the support of the Manghit mirzas, Abu'l-Khayr of the Shibanid dynasty emerged victorious. Under his rule also came the hereditary domains of the descendants of Urus Khan in the region of the Syr Darya and Turkestan. Nevertheless, Kerey and Janibek rejected Abu'l-Khayr's authority. Ashtarkhanid sources recognized their Jochid claim to rule, with Mahmud ibn Wali describing their departure as a renunciation of "the country inherited [from their ancestors]".

This tribal confederation migrated to Moghulistan, where they practiced qazaqliq. At the time, qazaqlıq was a common form of political struggle among the Chinggisid elite, in which unsuccessful claimants to the throne withdrew to the frontiers and lived by hunting and raiding. Around 1470, the Kazakh tribes, led by Janibek and Kerei, settled in what is now Kazakhstan, gradually coalescing into a powerful union. The term qazaq, originally a sociopolitical designation, became an ethnic designation.

By the end of the 15th century, a truce was concluded between the Kazakhs and Uzbeks. Around 1495–1496, Burunduk Khan and Muhammad Shaybani Khan agreed on a division of territories: the Kazakh rulers retained control over several cities of northern Turkestan, while the Shaybanids held the southern cities such as Otrar, Yasi, Arkuq, and Uzgend. To consolidate peace, dynastic marriages were arranged. During this period, Muhammad Shaybani controlled only the southern part of Turkestan. At the turn of the 15th–16th centuries, he conquered Transoxiana (Mawarannahr) and founded a new state, the Shaybanid state. On a significant part of the Eastern Desht-i Kipchak and Turkestan, the rule of the descendants of Urus Khan was restored. The Kazakh rulers expanded the territory of their state into Jetisu as well. Later, after the collapse of Moghulistan in the early 16th century, the process of unification of Kazakh ethnic groups within a single state accelerated, a process that had begun in the early years of the migration of Kerei and Janibek into Moghulistan. The population of Jetisu (the future tribes of the Senior Juz) recognized the authority of Burunduk Khan, and their lands were incorporated into the Kazakh Khanate.

=== Burunduk and Kasym ===
Kasym, son of Janibek, became the khan in 1511 and from that point only the descendants of Janibek Khan ruled Kazakh khanate until its fall. Under his rule, the Kazakh Khanate reached its greatest strength so much that the Nogai Horde, which occupied the territory of modern Western Kazakhstan, became its number one enemy. Kasym successfully captured the Nogai capital Saray-Juk in 1520, pushing the Nogai Horde to the Astrakhan Khanate. Under Kasym Khan, the borders of the Kazakh Khanate expanded and the population reached 1 million people. It was during the reign of Kasym Khan that the Kazakh Khanate gained fame and political weight in the modern Euro-Asian arena. Kasym Khan also became a major patron of the arts, literature, and religion, allowing Islam to hold great political and sociocultural importance among Kazakh society.

The manuscript of "Tarikh-Safavi", written by Persian historians, wrote about Kasym Khan, bringing most of the Dasht-i-Qipchaq under his absolute control. The manuscript also describes how a Kazakh army of eight thousand soldiers helped Shaybani Khan of Bukhara annex the Iranian city of Khorasan. Although a truce had been concluded, the Kazakhs soon returned to active warfare and carried out repeated raids into Transoxiana, targeting the domains of Shaybani Khan. By this time the most powerful ruler in Central Asia, Shaybani Khan responded with several punitive campaigns against the Kazakhs, but with no lasting result. In 1510, however, Kasym Khan inflicted a major defeat on a large Uzbek force, a blow that contributed in part to the eventual fall of Muhammad Shaybani Khan.

Expanding his territories, Kasym advanced westward and annexed the Nogai Horde, whose principal territories lay between the Volga and Yaik rivers. By the 1510s, Kasym had firmly established his rule over vast expanses of the Steppe. Kasym also developed diplomatic relations with other states. One of the first states to establish diplomatic contacts with him was the Tsardom of Russia under Vasily III Ivanovich. During Kasym's reign, the Kazakhs became known in Western Europe as a distinct ethnic community after being mentioned by the Austrian diplomat Sigismund von Herberstein, who visited Moscow in 1517 and 1526. In the final years of Kasym's reign, relations between the Kazakh Khanate and the Shaybanids once again became strained. The struggle centered on Tashkent. In the winter of 1516–1517, Uzbek rulers launched a campaign against the Kazakhs and approached the city, but failed to capture it.

By the end of Kasym Khan's reign, the southern borders of the Kazakh Khanate extended to the right bank of the Syr Darya, including Tashkent, Turkestan, and Sayram. To the southeast, the khanate encompassed the foothills and valleys of Jetisu. In the north and northeast, its borders extended toward the Ulytau Mountains and Lake Balkhash, reaching the foothills of the Karkaraly Mountains, while in the northwest they reached the Yaik River basin. Accordingly, Kasym Khan was described by Mirza Muhammad Haidar Dughlat as the most powerful ruler of the Qipchaq Steppe or the Jochid Ulus since the reign of Jochi Khan, possessing an army numbering over one million men.

=== Turmoil and civil war ===
Following the death of Kasym Khan around 1521, the Kazakh Khanate entered a period of rapid decline under the rule of his son Mamash Khan and subsequently under Tahir Khan and Buydash Khan, the sons of his brother Adiq Sulṭan. Mamash Khan was killed in combat, while Tah Khan lost the support of most of his followers and was eventually abandoned by them. In the aftermath, the Manghits reasserted their control over the Qipchaq Steppe. After Buydash Khan’s reign, internal fragmentation and political weakness reached such an extent that Muḥammad Ḥaidar Dughlāt observed that after the year 940 AH (1533–1534), "the Kazakhs were completely uprooted." The Kazakh Khanate regained its control over the eastern Qipchaq Steppe during the reign of Haqnazar, a son of Kasym Khan.

=== Haqnazar Khan (1537–1580) ===
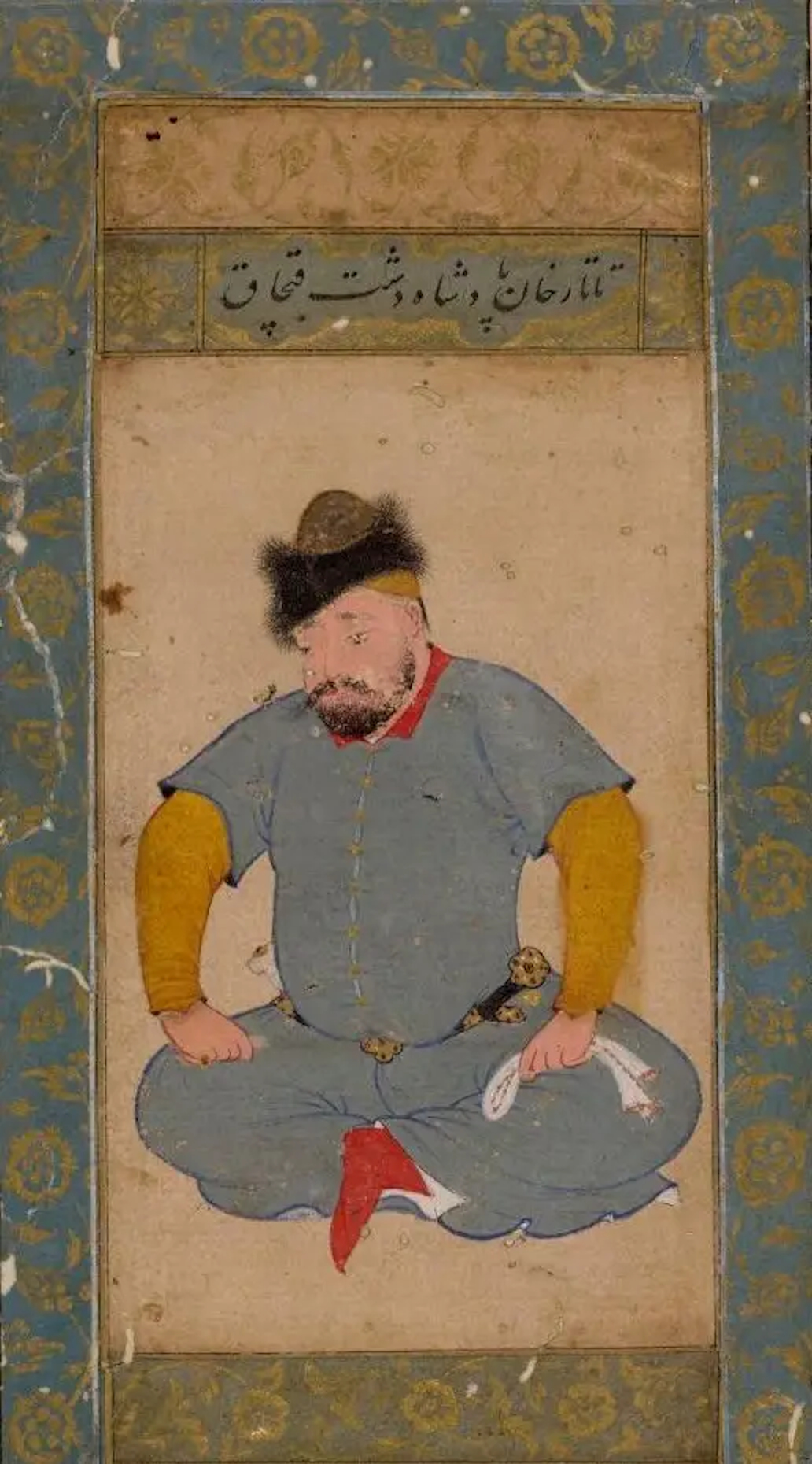
Padishah (Emperor) of Dast-i Qipchaq, (1550). Possible portrait of Kazakh khan.

Under Haqnazar Khan, also known as Haq-Nazar or Khaknazar Khan or Ak Nazar Khan, The Kazakh Khanate regained control over the eastern Qipchaq Steppe during the reign of Haqq Nazar, a son of Kasym Khan, successfully defeating the Manghits (Nogai Horde). The Kazakhs dealt several significant defeats to the Manghits. For example, in 1557, they captured the brothers and relatives of the Manghit leader Ismail. By 1569, Haqq Nazar, along with about twenty other Kazakh princes, launched raids against the Manghits, and as a result, the Manghit nomads living east of the Ural River were absorbed into the Kazakh state.

Haqnazar Khan began to liberate the occupied Kazakh lands. He returned the northern regions of Sary-Arka to the Kazakh Khanate. Having begun a campaign against the Nogai Horde, Haqnazar reconquered Sarai-Jk from the Nogai Horde and the surrounding Kazakh territories as well. In the fight against the Khivans, the Kazakhs conquered the Mangyshlak peninsula but were defeated by the Oirats and the Moghuls in the 1560's when Haqnazar attempted to capture Jeitsu.

In 1568, the Kazakhs successfully defeated the Nogai Horde at the Emba River and reached Astrakhan, but were repelled by Russian forces.

At the same time, the Kazakhs attempted to take Tashkent from the Shibanid Uzbeks. The English traveler Anthony Jenkinson, who visited Bukhara in 1558, noted that the city was frequently raided by the Kazakhs. Haqq Nazar also became involved in a dispute between two Abu al-Khairid leaders: Abdallah, who had been the effective ruler of Bukhara since 1561, and Baba Sultan, the governor of Tashkent and son of the former Abu al-Khairid khan Nauruz Ahmad (1552–1556). Initially, the Kazakhs supported Baba Sultan, but they later switched their allegiance to Abdallah. Haqq Nazar and several Kazakh princes plotted against Baba Sultan, but he launched a counterattack and defeated them. Haqq Nazar was killed while trying to escape.

According to popular tradition, by the time of Haqq Nazar Khan, the Kazakhs had divided into three groups: the Great Horde in Jetisu, the Middle Horde in central Kazakhstan and southwestern Siberia, and the Little Horde in western Kazakhstan. These names reflected their respective order of seniority. The Kazakhs, despite internal divisions, periodically extended their power to the Kyrgyz, Noghais, and the Bashkirs.

=== Shygai Khan (1580–1582) ===
Shygai Khan, a son of Adiq Sultan and grandson of Janibek Khan, succeeded Haqq Nazar Khan around 1581. He supported Abdallah Khan II in his conflict with Baba Sultan of Tashkent. Shygai went to Bukhara with his son Tawakkul and swore allegiance to Abdallah. In 1582, Shygai and Tawakkul led the vanguard of Abdallah’s army during the campaign against Baba Sultan. Tawakkul caught up with Baba Sultan while he was fleeing and killed him. He was initially rewarded by Abdallah, but their alliance deteriorated after Tawakkul executed Baba Sultan’s son without Abdallah’s approval.

=== Tawakkul Khan (1586–1598) ===
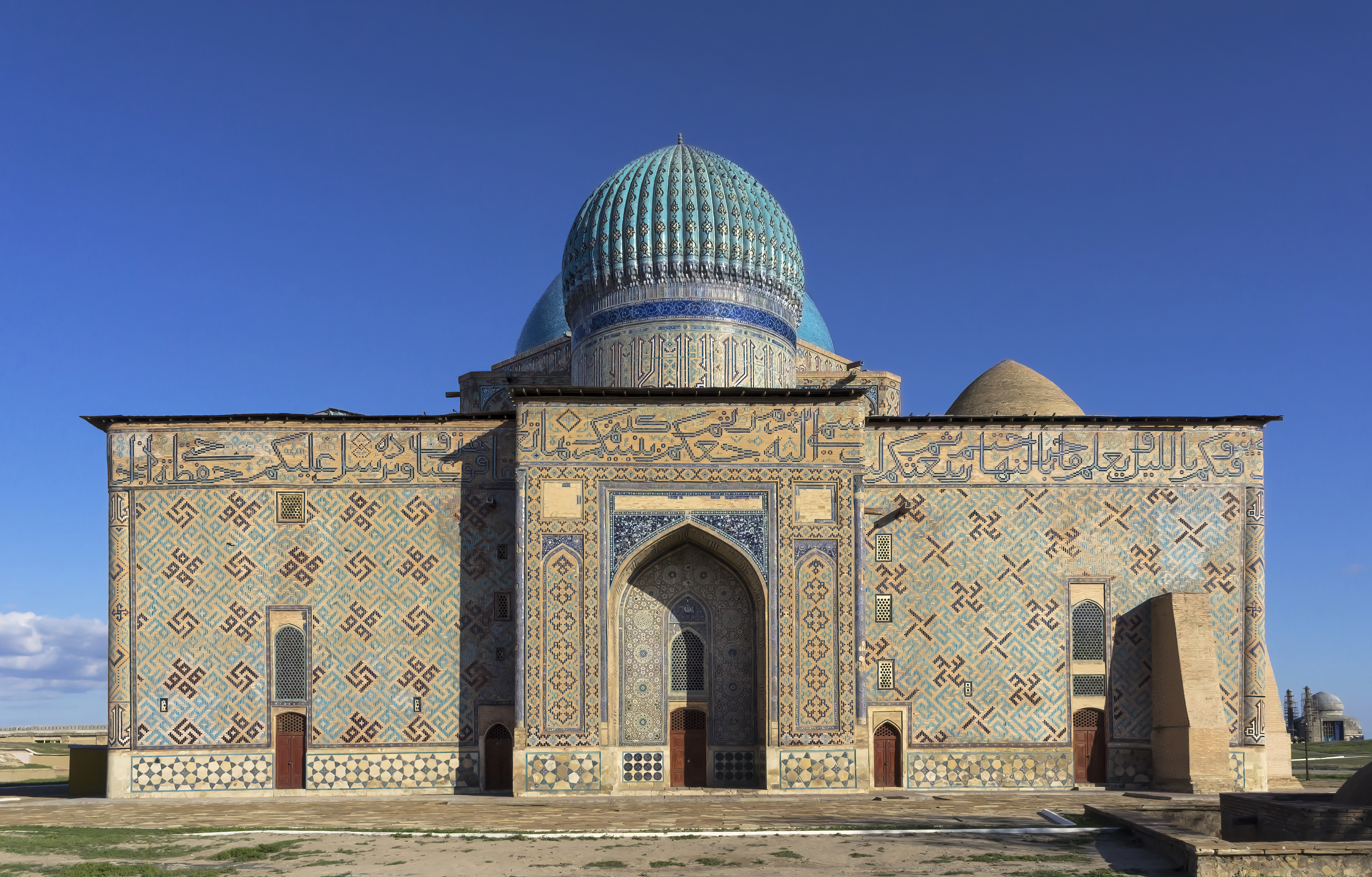
Mausoleum of Khoja Ahmed Yasawi in Hazrat-e Turkestan, Kazakhstan

After succeeding his father, Tawakkul Khan challenged Abdallah Khan II, who was emerging as the most powerful ruler in the eastern Islamic world in the late 16th century. By 1582, Abdallah had subdued all other Abu al-Khairid rival sultans and formally became khan in 1583 after the death of his father, Iskandar. Abdallah expanded his territories, capturing Badakhshan from the Timurid Mughals under Akbar in 1584 and Khorasan from the Safavids under Shah Abbas I by 1589. Khorezm was also annexed into his empire in 1594–1595.

The exact date of Tawakkul's accession to the throne of the Kazakh Khanate is unknown. According to Iskander Munshi, he "assumed the title of khan", possibly in 1573. After coming to power, Tawakkul pursued an active foreign policy and established authority over neighboring peoples. Thus, one of his sons was appointed ruler of forty Karakalpak clans, and Tawakkul's brother, Shah-Muhammad Sultan, became the head of part of the Oirats bordering the Kazakh Khanate, likely the Khoshut tribe. In the neighboring Yarkent Khanate, Tawakkul Khan's position was also "decisive in resolving the question of who would occupy the throne of this realm".

In 1594, a Kazakh embassy led by Kul-Mukhammed arrived in Moscow with the aim of securing the release of Tawakkul's nephew, Oraz-Muhammad, who was held in captivity, and purchasing weapons for the war against the Shaybanids. The Russian government was also interested in establishing mutual relations, as it hoped to use the Kazakhs against the Siberian khan Kuchum. However, despite this, the Kazakh request was not fulfilled. To clarify the situation of the Kazakh state, a Russian embassy led by V. Stepanov was sent.

In 1597, when Abdallah’s son Abd al-Mu’min revolted, Tawakkul invaded Tashkent and defeated the Uzbek relief forces (see Kazakh invasion of Northern Bukhara). Abdallah personally led an army against Tawakkul, who retreated to the steppe. Abdallah Khan II died before confronting him. After Abd al-Mu'min was assassinated in 1598, Tawakkul and his brother Ishim launched another campaign in Transoxiana. The Kazakhs captured Tashkent, Turkistan, Andijan, and Samarqand but failed to take Bukhara. They were eventually defeated in subsequent battles by the Uzbeks, including forces led by Baki Muhammad, the founder of the Toqay-Timurid (Astrakhanid) dynasty. Tawakkul retreated to Tashkent but soon died from his injuries.

=== Esim Khan and Tursun khan (1598–1628) ===
After the death of Tawakkul Khan, Sultan Esim (Yessim), the son of Shygai Khan, became the ruler. His reign marked a period of the Kazakh Khanate’s third major rise in power, following the eras of Qasim Khan and Haqq Nazar Khan. Yesim Khan moved the capital of the Khanate from Sygnak to the city of Turkestan. He suppressed a rebellion by the Karakalpaks, who had seized Tashkent, and in 1613 forced them to leave the middle reaches of the Syr Darya.

During this period, the ruling elite in the Bukhara Khanate changed: power shifted from the Shaybanids to the Astrakhanids. Upon consolidating his rule, Yesim Khan concluded a truce with the Astrakhanid representatives. As a result, the cities of Turkestan and Tashkent, along with their surrounding districts, became part of the Kazakh Khanate for 200 years, and Fergana was temporarily incorporated as well. However, the truce did not end the struggle between the Kazakh rulers and the Astrakhanids over Tashkent, and competition for control of Turkestan continued later with mixed results. During his reign, Yesim actively fought against the Bukhara rulers Baki Muhammad and Imam-Quli for control over key cities in the Syr Darya region, including Tashkent, which he captured twice, in 1611 and 1613.

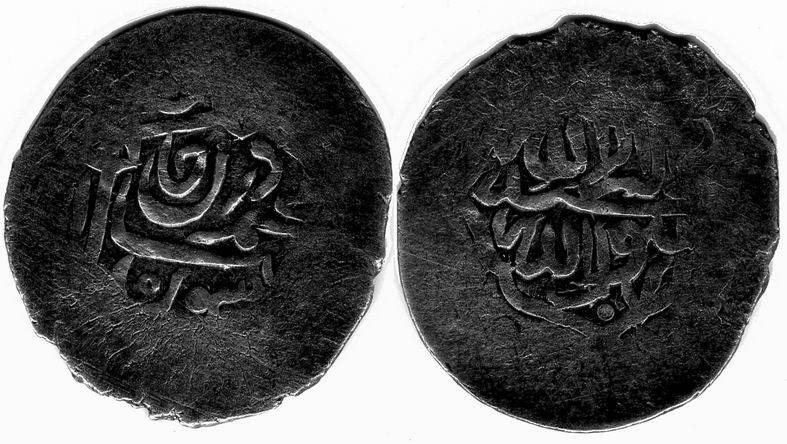
Coins of Tursun Khan, who minted his coins in Tashkent

Yesim also strongly opposed the separatist ambitions of certain Kazakh sultans and sought to create a centralized state with a strong khan’s authority. However, in the mid-1610s, after Sultan Tursun usurped the khan’s throne, Yesim was forced to leave Kazakh territories and take refuge in Moghulistan, choosing Turkestan as his residence. There, he united some Kyrgyz tribes and established an alliance with Abd ar-Rahim, the ruler of Chalish and Turfan. Yesim also made several attempts to recover cities captured by the Moghulistan rulers, including Aksu. During these periods, conflicts also emerged within the Kazakh Khanate among the representatives of supreme power. One figure in particular stood out: Tursun Muhammad Khan. Later, in 1613/1614, with the support of the Astrakhanid Imam-Quli Khan, Tursun Khan ascended to the throne of the Kazakh Khanate. In the early years of his reign, the Khanate retained its military and political strength. Sources note that even the warlike Oirat tribes were reluctant to wage war against the Kazakhs, "because Tursun the Tsar is strong".

However, the strengthening of the state was hampered by ongoing internecine wars, which escalated particularly when Yesim, after spending several years in the Moghul state, decided to return to the steppes. In 1626/27, according to Bahr al-Asrar, Tursun Muhammad Khan and Yesim Khan "forgave each other and renewed the bonds of friendship". Presumably, Yesim recognized Tursun's authority as the senior Chinggisid by age. The Shaybanid Abu-l-Ghazi Bahadur Khan, who was visiting Turkestan at the time, also noted that Yesim treated him with respect. Nevertheless, peace between the two Kazakh rulers was short-lived. When Yesim set out on campaigns against the Oirats, Tursun Khan took advantage of the opportunity and plundered the khan's camp. He then attempted to intercept Yesim's forces "to catch him by surprise and seize him en route". However, in the battle near Sayram, Tursun’s army suffered a severe defeat. In Tashkent, at the critical moment, Tursun's own subjects killed their khan and submitted to Yesim Khan. Following these events, Yesim became the undisputed ruler of the Kazakh Khanate.

After this, Yesim reclaimed the title of khan of all Kazakhs and restored authority over the territories that had been lost. He destroyed the Katagan clan, which had supported Tursun, and secured from Imam-Quli a renunciation of claims over the Syr Darya cities. At the same time, he faced raids by Oirat tribes, who attacked Kazakh lands. Yesim managed to defeat the Oirats and temporarily bring them under his authority. His name is also associated with an important legal achievement: the creation of the Kazakh legal code "Yesim Salghan Eski Zhol", which became the foundation for later legal frameworks, including the code of laws "Jety-Zhargy", adopted during the reign of Yesim's grandson, Khan Tauke. Yesim was buried in the Yesim Khan Mausoleum in Turkestan.

=== Salqam-Jangir Khan (1629–1652) ===
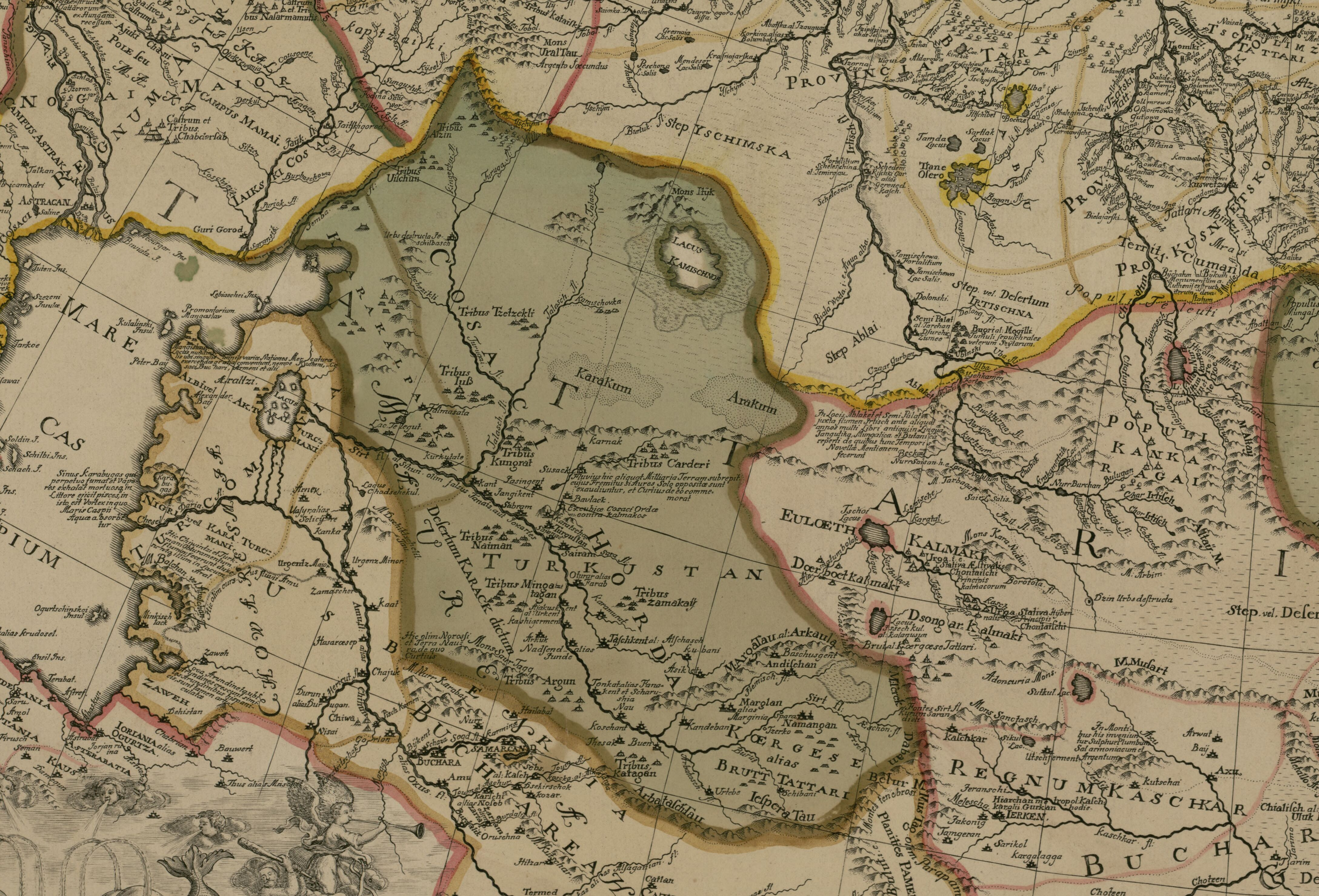
Map by F. I. von Straelenberg (1730), presumably reflecting the settlement of Kazakh tribes in the 1600s–1620s.

During the reign of Salqam-Jangir Khan, a new and powerful rival of the Kazakhs appeared in the east, known as the Dzungar Khanate.

Major battle began in the winter of 1643 with the attack of Erdeni Batur on the Kazakh lands. The Dzungars conquered a large part of the Jetisu Region and captured about ten thousand people. Salqam-Jangir Khan marched along the Orbulak River with 600 soldiers to repel the Zunghars. The famous Battle of Orbulaq took place here. Jalangtos Bahadur, the ruler of Samarkand, came to help Jangir Khan with 20,000 soldiers. Thanks to the help of Jalangtos Bahadur, Jangir Khan won this battle. Erdeni Batur was forced to retreat. The defeated Zunghars lost about ten thousand people in this battle. According to the preserved historical data, in this battle, Salqam-Jangir Khan showed great commanding talent and military skill.

In 1645–1646, Erdeni Batur launched a new campaign against the Kazakhs, inflicting heavy casualties and devastation on the Kazakh Khanate. The Oirat-Kazakh War of the 1640s and 1650s ultimately brought victory to the Oirats. In the 1650s, the eastern part of Semirechye, as well as the territory between the upper reaches of the Irtysh and Lake Balkhash, was dependent on the Dzungar Khanate. The headquarters of the Khuntaiji was located on the upper reaches of the Irtysh. Thus, Erdeni Batur significantly expanded the borders of his state.

In 1652, in the third major battle between the Kazakhs and the Dzungars, the Kazakh troops were defeated, and Salqam-Jangir Khan was killed.

=== Tauke Khan (1680–1718) ===
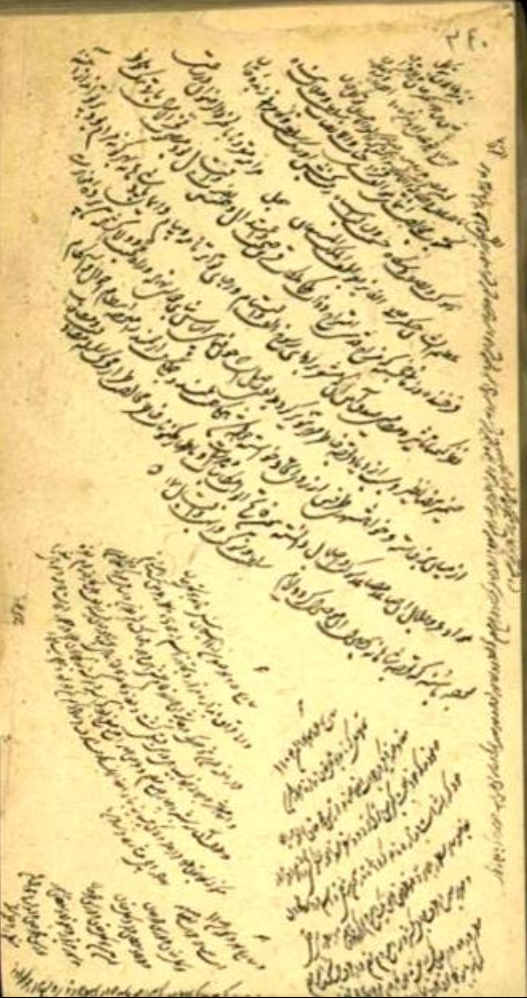
Safavid Shah Abbas II's letter to the Kazakh khan Tauke

The Kazakh Khanate saw a significant rise during the reign of Khan Tauke, whose rule marked an era of important reforms and strengthening of the state. One of his most notable achievements was the creation of a codified system of customary law for the Kazakhs, known as the "Jeti Zhargy" (Seven Laws).

Tauke made the first significant change to the system of power relations. He organized the activities of the biy (judges), making the meetings of the council of biy regular and constant. The bii councils became an important state body, serving as a vital communication channel within the system of governance. As a result, the authority of the rulers among the common people grew rapidly, enabling the political situation in the country to develop dynamically. During Tauke's reign, Kazakh-Russian conflicts began. The conflict began due to raids by the Bashkirs, Ural Cossacks, and Kalmyks.

Tauke aimed to strengthen his power within the Kazakh Khanate. One of his key initiatives was the reorganization of the council of biy (the Khan's advisors). He turned it into a permanent body with the authority to make decisive and final rulings. Additionally, Tauke carried out several measures to improve the military strength of the Kazakhs. He significantly increased the number of troops, which could reach up to 80,000 men during wartime. An important step in this effort was the creation of the "Jeti Zhargy" legal code, which regulated various aspects of life and law in the Khanate.

Tauke was actively engaged in foreign policy, seeking to strengthen relations with neighboring states. He formed an alliance with the Kyrgyz and Karakalpaks to combat the Dzungar Khanate. He also maintained peaceful relations with the Bukhara Khanate. Between 1686 and 1693, Tauke sent several diplomatic missions to Russia, and in 1694, he received Russian envoys at his court. After the suppression of the Bulavin Rebellion, he defeated the Cossacks who had participated in the uprising and attacked the Kazakh nomads.

In the final years of Tauke's reign, centrifugal forces strengthened within the Kazakh Khanate. Internal conflicts and rivalry between the khans came to the forefront, particularly between the khans Kaiyp and Abulkhair in the Junior Juz and others. After Tauke's death in 1715/1718, the Kazakh Khanate lost its unity, and the Juzes essentially became separate khanates.

=== Ablai Khan (1771–1781) ===
Ablai Khan was a khan of the Middle jüz or Horde who managed to extend his control over the other two jüzes to include all of the Kazakhs. Before he became khan, Ablai participated in the Kazakh–Dzungar Wars and proved himself a talented organizer and commander. He led numerous campaigns against the Kokand Khanate and the Kyrgyz. In the latter campaign, his troops liberated many cities in Southern Kazakhstan and even captured Tashkent. During his actual reign, Ablai Khan did his best to keep Kazakhstan as independent as possible from the encroaching Russian Empire and the Chinese Qing dynasty. He employed a multi-vector foreign policy to protect the tribes from Chinese and Dzungar aggressors. He also sheltered the Dzungar Oirat taishas Amursana and Dawachi from attacks by the Dzungar Khan Lama Dorji, as the Dzungar Khanate fractured following the death of Galdan Tseren in 1745. However, once Amursana and Dawachi were no longer allies, Ablai Khan took the opportunity to capture herds and territory from the Dzungars.

=== Fall ===
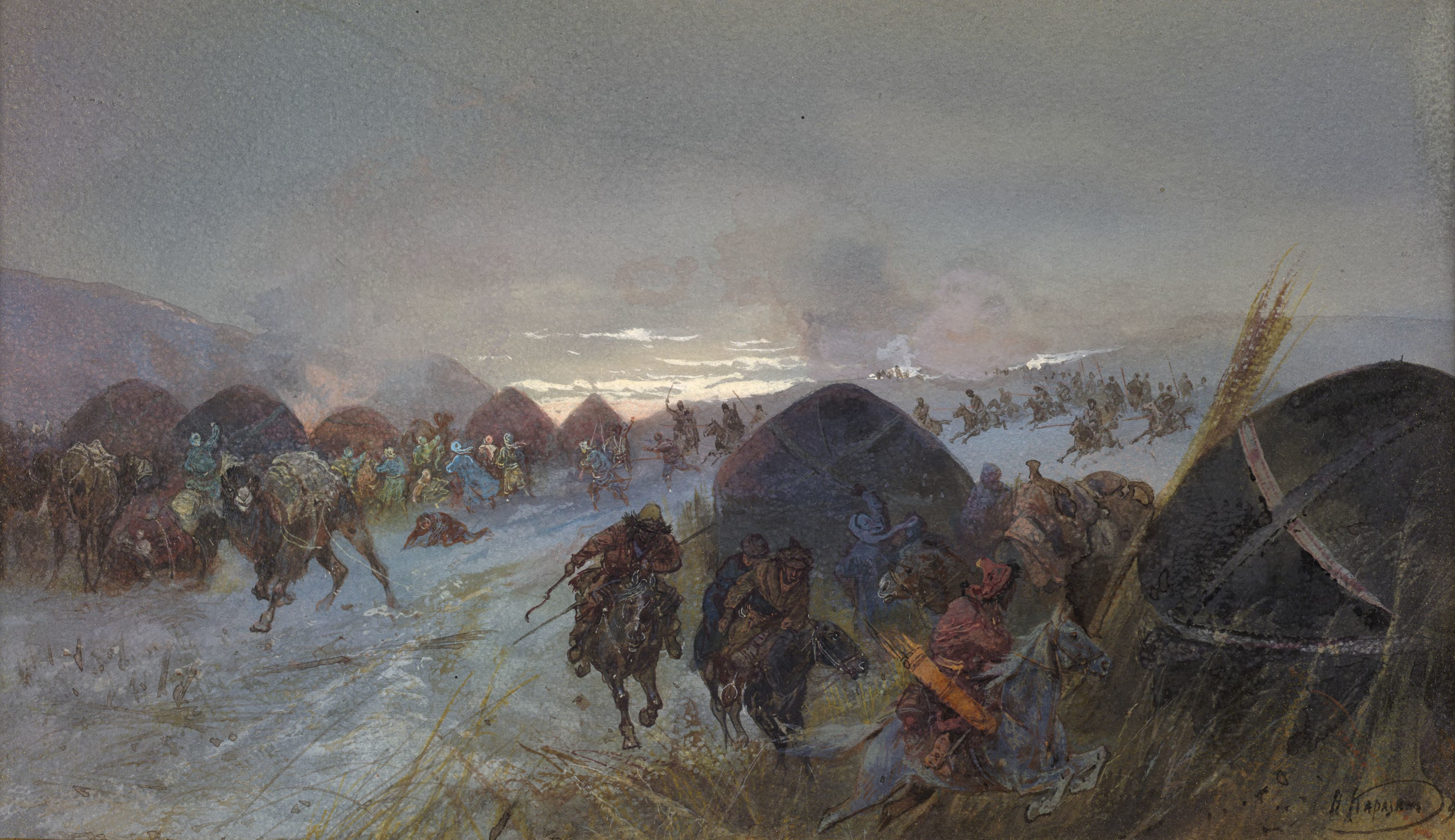
Cossack raid on a native settlement, by Nikolai Karazin

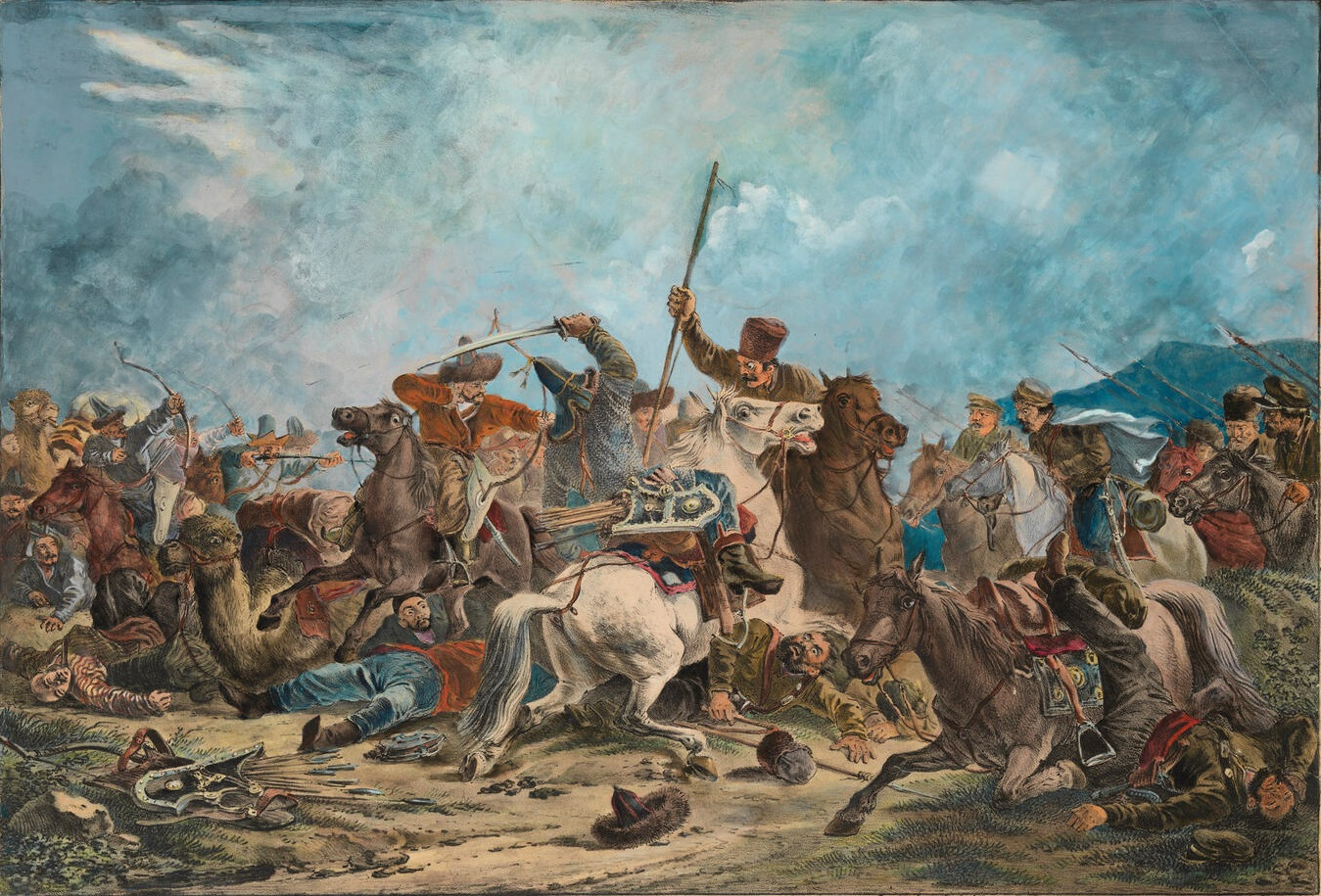
Battle between Cossacks and Kazakhs, by Alexander Orlowski, 1826

On October 10, 1731, the khan of the Junior Jüz, Abu'l Khayr, swore fealty to Anna of Russia to obtain Russian help against his rival Sultan Qayip and to secure economic stability. Shortly thereafter the Middle Jüz's Khan Semeke agreed to suzerainty under the same terms. Neither khan remained very loyal to the Russians, but from this point Russian sovereigns began to assert the right to appoint the khans of the Junior and Middle Jüzes and to exert greater influence on them. The Kazakhs in turn began to view the khanate with greater suspicion, as khans increasingly sought Russian help against their rivals within the Khanate.

According to Shevchenko, as well as the Encyclopædia Iranica, Oxford Research Encyclopedias, Soviet historians Ramazan Suleimenov and Vladimir Moiseev, as well as many pre-revolutionary and other Soviet historians, the allegiance was purely nominal in character. According to the Great Russian Encyclopedia, this did not constitute the incorporation of Kazakhstan into Russia; rather, it involved Abu'l-Khayr Khan's recognition of a relationship of vassalage to the empire. The Russian authorities did not interfere in the internal affairs of the Junior Juz and did not require the Kazakhs to participate in the empire's military campaigns, limiting themselves to the nominal collection of tribute (yasak) and the obligation that the Kazakhs refrain from attacking other nomadic peoples subject to Russia.

In A. I. Maksheev's words, "during the whole eighteenth and the beginning of the nineteenth century, the Kazakhs were Russian subjects in name only. In reality they preserved their independence. The Russians had to separate themselves from them with fortresses and troops and did not even dare to cross the Line."

Following the rule of Abu'l-Mansur Khan's death in 1781, the Middle Jüz was nominally ruled by his son Vali, but Vali never achieved control of the entire jüz. In an attempt to establish some order in 1798, Russia created a tribunal at Petropavlovsk to resolve disputes among the Kazakhs, but it was ignored by the Kazakhs. Following Vali's death in 1817 and his rival Bukei's death in 1818, Russia abolished the Khanate of the Middle Jüz. In 1822, Russia began to refer to the land until then occupied by the Middle Jüz as the territory of the Siberian Kirgiz and introduced a set of administrative reforms, some of them intended to encourage the Kazakhs to become farmers, but the Kazakhs remained nomadic.

1827–1828 saw the first serious Kazakh resistance to the Russians, as Qayip Ali led fighters of the Bukey Horde against a Russian garrison blocking them from crossing the Ural River to find needed grazing land. In the following years, Qayip Ali helped Isatay Taymanuly build a resistance movement designed to free his people from both the khan of the Bukey Horde and the Russians. The movement was crushed in July 1838.

By 1837, some tribes of the Middle jüz led by Kenesary Kasymov started war with the Russian occupiers. Support for the resistance was fueled by Russians' refusal to allow them much-needed additional grazing land, taxes, and the feeling that they were being exploited by Russian merchants. Kasymov managed to unite the entire Middle jüz for the last time in popular opposition to the Russians. The resistance came to an end when Russia deployed sufficient forces to make Kenesary surrender in 1846. He died the next year fighting Kokand forces in Kirgizia.

Kenesary Khan was the last Kazakh Khan who defeated Shergazi Muhammad Khan (khan of the Junior jüz) and Gubaidullah Khan (khan of the Elder jüz) to unite the Kazakhs one last time. Following his rule, he became the leader of the national liberation movement that resisted the capture of Kazakh lands and segregation policies by the Russian Empire. He was the grandson of Ablai Khan and is largely regarded as the last ruler of the Kazakh Khanate.

By the mid 19th century, the Kazakhs fell under the full control of the Russian Empire and were banned from electing their own leader or even given representation in the empire's legislative structures. All fiscal/tax collections were also taken away from local Kazakh representatives and given to Russian administrators. Kenesary Khan fought against the Russian imperial forces until his death in 1847.

== Economy ==
Located at the middle of the Silk Road its main source of income was trading horses, cattle, pottery, fur etc. By the mid 18th century, the Russian Empire had expanded into Siberia, and Russian settlements started to appear along the Volga and Yaik rivers. The Kazakh–Russian relationship at the border regions was tense, which often resulted in mutual raids by Russian Cossacks on Kazakh lands and Kazakhs on Russian settlements.

=== Kazakh Khanate slave trade on Russian settlement ===
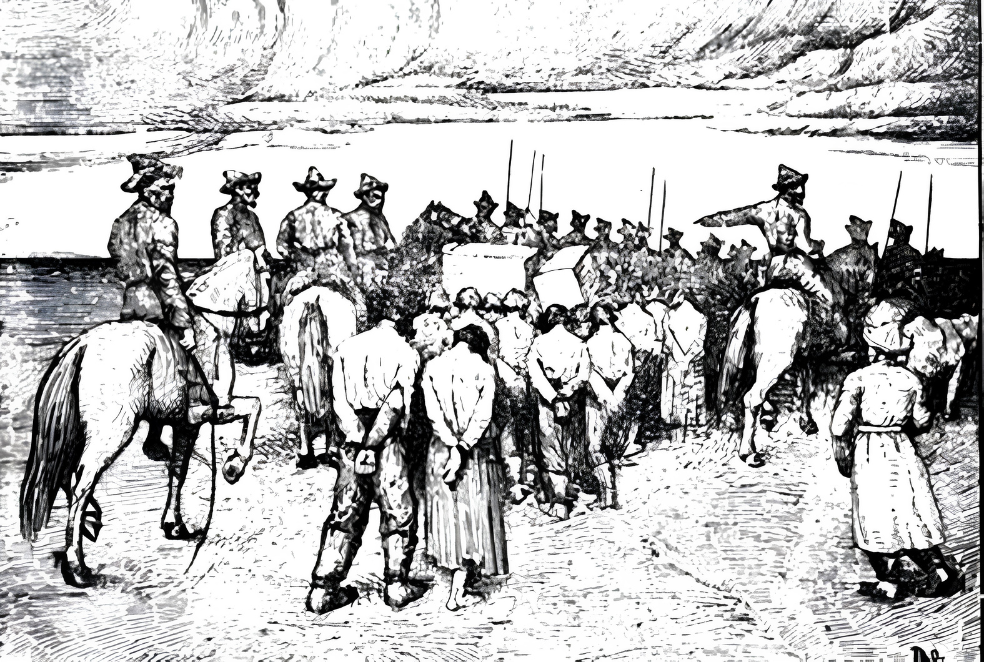
Kazakh raiders leading captive colonists into slavery

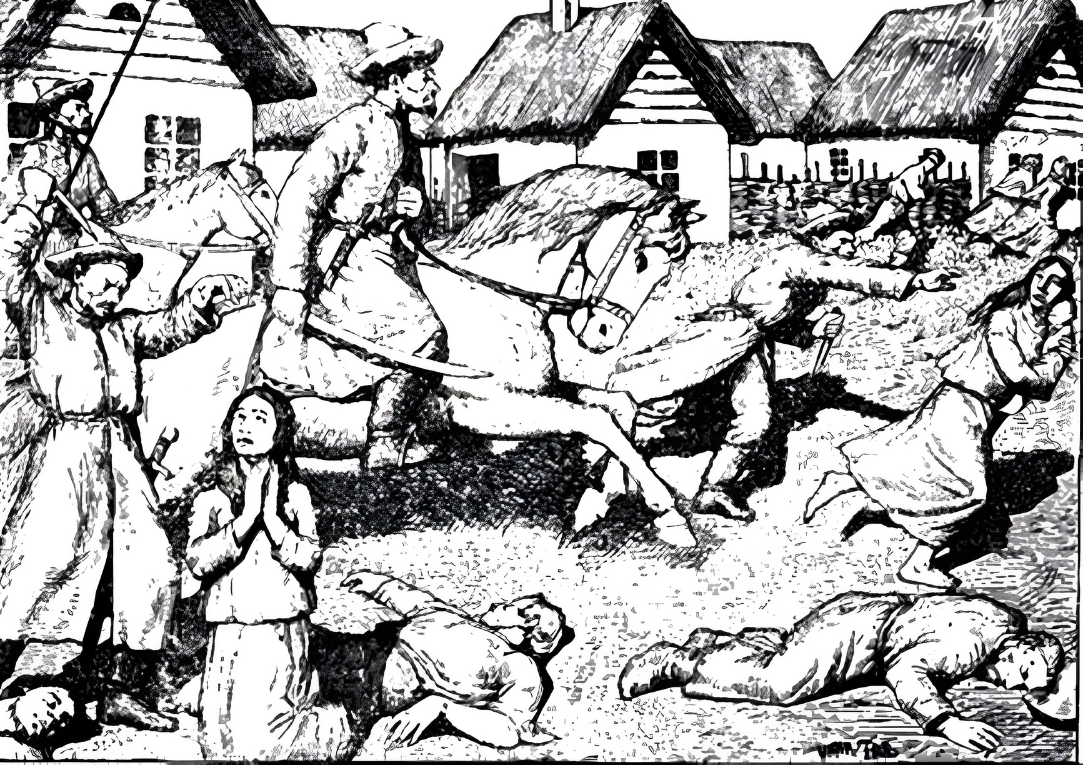
Attack on the Volga German colony of Chasselois by Kazakh raiders (1785)

During the 18th century, raids by Kazakhs on Russia's territory of Orenburg were common; the Kazakhs captured many Russians and sold them as slaves in the Central Asian market. The Volga Germans were also victims of Kazakh raids; they were ethnic Germans living along the River Volga in the region of southeastern European Russia around Saratov.

In 1717, 3,000 Russian slaves, men, women, and children, were sold in Khiva by Kazakh and Kyrgyz tribesmen.

In 1722, they stole cattle, robbed from Russian villages and people trapped in captivity and sold in the slave markets of Central Asia (in 1722 in Bukhara there were over 5,000 Russian prisoners). In the middle of the 17th century, 500 Russians were annually sold to Khiva by Kazakhs.

In 1730, the Kazakhs' frequent raids into Russian lands were a constant irritant and resulted in the enslavement of many of the Tsar's subjects, who were sold on the Kazakh steppe.

In 1736, urged on by Kirilov, the Kazakhs of the Lesser and Middle Hordes launched raids into Bashkir lands, killing or capturing many Bashkirs in the Siberian and Nogay districts.

In 1743, an order was given by the Senate in response to the failure to defend against the Kazakh attack on a Russian settlement, which resulted in 14 Russians killed, 24 wounded. In addition, 96 Cossacks were captured by Kazakhs.

In 1755, Nepliuev tried to enlist Kazakh support by ending the reprisal raids and promising that the Kazakhs could keep the Bashkir women and children living among them (a long-standing point of contention between Nepliuev and Khan Nurali of the Junior Jüz). Thousands of Bashkirs would be massacred or taken captive by Kazakhs over the course of the uprising, whether in an effort to demonstrate loyalty to the Tsarist state, or as a purely opportunistic maneuver.

In the period between 1764 and 1803, according to data collected by the Orenburg Commission, twenty Russian caravans were attacked and plundered. Kazakh raiders attacked even big caravans which were accompanied by numerous guards.

In spring 1774, the Russians demanded the Khan return 256 Russians captured by a recent Kazakh raid.

In summer 1774, when Russian troops in the Kazan region were suppressing the rebellion led by the Cossack leader Pugachev, the Kazakhs launched more than 240 raids and captured many Russians and herds along the border of Orenburg.

In 1799, the biggest Russian caravan which was plundered at that time lost goods worth 295,000 rubles.

By 1830, the Russian government estimated that two hundred Russians were kidnapped and sold into slavery in Khiva every year.

=== Russian empire slave trade on Kazakh settlement ===
In 1737, Empress of Russia Anna Ioannovna issued an order that legalized the slave trade in Siberia.

There were accounts of Russian Cossack raids that captured Kazakh families, which were then taken to Petropavlovsk and Omsk, where they were sold to wealthy Russian land owners into serfdom.

By the end of 18th century, the lands of Kazakh Junior Jüz (or Junior Horde) were incorporated into the Russian Empire, and raids by Kazakhs on Russian colonies had gradually declined and stopped.

On May 23, 1808, Governor Peter Kaptzevich signed an order that freed all slave or serf Kazakhs of both genders who reached the age of 25.

=== Abolition of slavery ===
At major markets in Bukhara, Samarkand, Karakul, Karshi, and Charju, slaves consisted mainly of Iranians and Russians, and some Kalmuks; they were brought there by Turkmen, Kazakh and Kyrgyz. A notorious slave market for captured Russian and Persian slaves was centered in the Khanate of Khiva from the 17th to the 19th century. During the first half of the 19th century alone, some one million Persians, as well as an unknown number of Russians, were enslaved and transported to Central Asian khanates. When Russian troops took Khiva in 1873 there were 29,300 Persian slaves, captured by Turkoman raiders. According to Josef Wolff (Report of 1843–1845) the population of the Khanate of Bukhara was 1,200,000, of whom 200,000 were Persian slaves.

== List of rulers ==
Kazakh Khans who ruled the three jüzes
Name	Ruling period	Name in Kazakh
Kerei Khan	1456–1473	Керей-хан, كيري
Janibek Khan	1473–1480	Жәнібек-хан, جانيبك
Burunduk Khan	1480–1511	Бұрындық-хан (Мұрындық), بوروندي
Qasim Khan	1511–1518	Қасым-хан, قاسم
Muhammed Khan	1518–1523	Мұхаммед-хан, محمد
Tahir Khan	1523–1533	Тахир-хан, طاهر
Buidash Khan	1533–1538	Бұйдаш-хан, بويداش
Ahmed Khan	1533–1535	Ахмед-хан, أحمد
Toghym Khan	1535–1537	Тоғым-хан, توغيم
Haqnazar Khan	1538–1580	Хақназар-хан, حقنازار
Shygai Khan	1580–1582	Шығай-хан, شیغی
Tauekel Khan (Tawakkul Khan)	1582–1598	Тәуекел-хан, تاوکل
Esim Khan	1598–1628	Есім-хан, عاصم
Salqam Jangir Khan	1628–1652	Жәңгір-хан, جهانگیر
Bahadur Khan	1652–1680	Баһадүр, بهادور
Tauke Khan	1680–1715	Тәуке-хан, تاوكي
Ablai Khan	1771–1781	Әбілмансұр, Абылай-хан أبو المنصور
Kenesary Khan	1841–1847	Кенесары, كينيساري

== See also ==
- List of wars involving Kazakhstan
- History of Kazakhstan
- List of Kazakh khans
- List of Sunni Muslim dynasties
- Nomad (2006 film)
- Kazakh Khanate – Golden Throne
