= Janibek Khan =

Khan of the Kazakh Khanate from 1473 to 1480

Janibek
- Khan
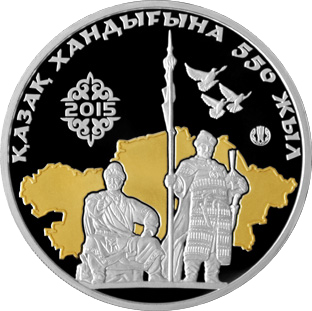
- Monument to Janibek Khan (on the right) on a commemorative coin of Kazakhstan

Khan of the Kazakh Khanate
- Reign: c. 1473/4 – c. 1480
- Predecessor: Kerei Khan
- Successor: Burunduk Khan
- Born: c. 1428
- Died: c. 1480 (aged 51–52); Sighnaq, Kazakh Khanate
- Spouse: Jahan Begum Khanum
- Issue: Qasim Khan; Mahmud Rahim Sultan; Janysh Sultan; Iranji Sultan; Qanabar Sultan; Usuk Muhammed Sultan; Ithik Sultan; Tenish Sultan; Juak Sultan; Suyimbike Khanum; Amanbike Khanum
Names
- Abū Saʿīd Janıbek Bahadur Khan bin Barak Sultan ابو سعید جانی بک بهادر خان بن براق سلطان
- House: House of Borjigin
- Dynasty: Töre; House of Urus Khan
- Father: Barak Khan
- Religion: Sunni Islam

Abū Saʿīd Janibek Bahadur Khan bin Barak Sultan (Kazakh: ابو سعید جانی بک بهادر خان بن براق سلطان, Әбу Саид Жәнібек Баһадүр хан бин Барақ сұлтан, Äbu Saïd Jänıbek Bahadür Han bïn Baraq Sultan), otherwise known by his shortened regal name Janibek Khan, was a co-founder and the second khan of the Kazakh Khanate from 1473 to 1480.

== Family ==
=== Genealogy ===
- Genghis Khan
- Jochi
- Tuqa-Timur
- Urung-Timur (Uz-Timur, Urungbash)
- Achiq
- Taqtaq
- Timur Khwaja
- Badiq
- Urus Khan
- Quyurchuq
- Barak Khan

=== Wives and children ===
From his wife Jahan Begum Khanum, Janibek had nine sons: Qasim (who became his successor), Mahmud, Iranji, Ithik, Janysh, Qanabar, Tenish, Usuk, and Juak. She also bore him two daughters, Suyimbike and Amanbike.

== Reign ==
Janibek Khan was a co-leader of the new Kazakh Khanate, following a successful rebellion against the Uzbek khan Abu'l-Khayr Khan in 1465 and 1466. Janibek's father was Barak Khan, who was poisoned by the emirs of the former White Horde. He led the splinter group along with Kerei (or Girei or Kerei), his relative, who was also a descendant of the famous Urus Khan of the White Horde. For his wisdom, he was given the title "Az", meaning "the wise" in the Kazakh language, and so was called Az-Janibek. His son, Kasym Khan, codified the laws of his people.

| Preceded by Kerei Khan | Khan of the Kazakhs; 1473/4 – c. 1480 | Succeeded by Burunduk Khan |
