= Burunduk Khan =

Khan of the Kazakh Khanate from c. 1480 to 1511

Burunduk
- Khan; Khanzada; Sultan

Khan of the Kazakh Khanate
- Reign: c. 1480 – 1511
- Coronation: c. 1480
- Predecessor: Janibek Khan
- Successor: Kasym Khan
- Born: Uzbek Khanate
- Died: 1511; Samarkand, Khanate of Bukhara
- Burunduq bin Kerei Khan
- House: House of Borjigin
- Dynasty: Tore; House of Urus Khan
- Father: Kerei Khan
- Religion: Sunni Islam

Burunduk Khan (Kazakh: برندوق خان, Бұрындық хан, Būryndyq han) also known as Muryndyq (Kazakh: Мұрындық, Mūryndyq) was a son of Kerei Khan and the third Khan of the Kazakh Khanate in 1474 or from 1480 to 1511.

== Biography ==
Burunduk became a khan in 1474. The sources describe the reign of Burunduk Khan with other names of the khans mentioned as well in which among the most authoritative was Kasym Khan, the son of Janibek Khan who roamed around Lake Balkhash and the Karatal River. At the same time, Burunduk Khan was inferior to Kasym Khan due to his number of supporters which had million and Janysh-Sultan, had only one hundred thousand. Although Burynduq was considered a Khan, Kasym who commanded Kazakh troops, was more famous due to his involvement in the battles with Muhammad Shaybani. The Kazakh sultans supported Kasym as well since in every military campaign he earned a victory due to his nobility, so his influence grew so much that he was declared as the Khan of all Kazakhs despite not having an official title and the recognized Khan, Burunduk, did not enjoy any popularity. Because of this, most of the power during Burunduk's reign belonged to Kasym Khan. In 1511, Burunduk was forcefully deposed, but Kasym spared his life and allowed him to retire to Maverannahr. Burunduk forever left his native steppes and instead went to Samarkand, where he lived with one of his daughters and died. Burunduk was the only Kazakh khan that was a descendant of Kerei Khan, while the rest were descended from Janibek Khan.

Preceded by Janibek Khan	Khan of the Kazakhs c. 1480 – 1511	Succeeded by Kasym Khan
