= Kazakh–Dzungar Wars =

Military conflicts in Central Asia, 1635–1743

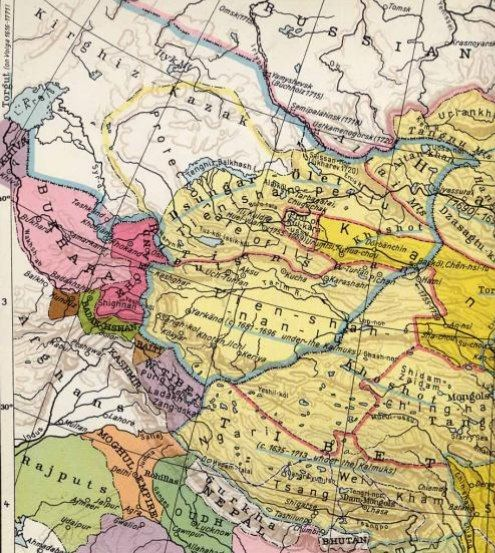
- Map of Central Asia in 1760
Date	1635–1755 (1756)
Location	Kazakh Khanate, Dzungar Khanate

Belligerents
Kazakh Khanate (Note: After the death of Tauke Khan (1715/1718), the Kazakh Khanate lost its former unity, and the hordes (juzes) became independent khanates. The last khan of the Kazakhs whose authority was recognized throughout the Kazakh steppe was Abylai Khan, proclaimed khan of all Kazakhs in 1771.); (Kazakh Khanate) Kazakh Jüzes	Dzungar Khanate

Commanders and leaders
(Kazakh Khanate) Salqam Jangir Khan † (Kazakh Khanate) Tauke Khan (Kazakh Khanate) Abul Khair Khan (Kazakh Khanate) Qabanbai Batyr (Kazakh Khanate) Ablai-sultan (POW) (Kazakh Khanate) Raiymbek Batyr (Kazakh Khanate) Bogenbay Batyr; Yalangtoʻsh Bakhodir	(Dzungar Khanate) Erdeni Batur (Dzungar Khanate) Galdan Boshugtu Khan (MIA) (Dzungar Khanate) Tsewang Rabtan Khan (Dzungar Khanate) Galdan Tseren Khan (Dzungar Khanate) Septen

The Kazakh–Dzungar Wars were a series of military conflicts between the Kazakh jüzes (three tribal confederations of the Kazakh Khanate) and the Dzungar Khanate lasting from the 17th to the mid-18th century. The conflict between the Kazakhs and the Oirats (Soon the Dzungars) started from the first half of the 16th-century, all the way down to the later half of the 18th-century. Both nations later fought against the Qing dynasty, particularly in the First Sino–Kazakh War of the Ten Great Campaigns.

== Background ==
During the 13th and 14th centuries, the Inner Asian nomadic peoples incorporated into the Mongol Empire gradually coalesced into various uluses under the rule of Chinggisid dynasties, such as the Ulus of Chagatai (Moghuls and Timurids), the Ulus of Jochi (Uzbeks, Kazakhs, and Tatars), and the Mongols of the Northern Yuan (Modern Khalkha Mongols). The Oirats, however, were a notable exception. They formed an independent political community and a major non-Chinggisid ulus, Dörben Oirat. (Note: In 1207, Jochi, the eldest son of Genghis Khan, subjugated the forest peoples, among whom were the Oirats. In the Secret History of the Mongols, the Oirats are mentioned only briefly as one of several tribes of non-Mongol origin, alongside the Keraites and Naimans. Later, the Oirats attained high positions within the Mongol Empire, while Oirat nobles enjoyed a privileged position in society and maintained ties with the house of Chinggis Khan. Following the defeat of the Naimans by Genghis Khan, the Oirats occupied the Naiman territories left vacant in the Altai Mountains. In the second half of the 14th century, the Oirats broke away from the authority of the Mongol khan and came to be ruled independently by their own leaders, including taishis, taijis, and khuntaijis.)

=== Rise of the Oirats and Uz Timur's Campaign ===
The late 14th and first half of the 15th centuries marked a period of Oirat ascendancy. Following the expulsion of the Mongols from China, internecine conflicts intensified, and central authority lost its prestige and influence. During this period, the western Mongolian steppes were controlled by the Oirats, while the eastern steppes were dominated by the Mongols of the Northern Yuan. The rise of the Oirats is associated with Togon Taishi, under whom Oirat foreign policy became more active. They fought the eastern Mongols, conducted campaigns into China and Moghulistan, and sought to establish a unified centralized state. From the 15th century onward, the Oirats increasingly challenged the Mongols ruled by Chinggisid rulers.

In the mid-15th century, the Oirats were led by the energetic ruler Esen Taishi, who united the Oirat tribes into a single nomadic empire and extended his authority over the eastern Mongols. The military strength of the nomadic state established by the Oirats was demonstrated by their crushing defeat of the Chinese Ming dynasty and the capture of the emperor, an unprecedented event in nearly three millennia of Chinese history. Subsequently, the Ming dynasty undertook an extensive program of construction and fortification of the Great Wall of China, much of which dates to this period. The Chinese dynastic chronicle Ming Shi states:

The Oirats are powerful barbarians and … commit evil deeds.

The Oirats moved westward from their ancestral homeland in search of fertile lands, which they found in the territories north of the Tian Shan. Gradually, they conquered lands belonging to the Moghuls, the inhabitants of Moghulistan, which had once been a fragment of the Chagatai Khanate. Esen decisively defeated the Moghul khan Wais Khan. Wais repeatedly suffered defeats at the hands of the Oirats and was captured by them twice. Esen's forces repeatedly advanced toward Issyk-Kul and even reached the Syr Darya. However, following Esen's fall, the Oirats were no longer able to maintain their position in Mongolia and henceforth confined their activities to their own territories.

=== Kazakh–Oirat Relations in the 16th–17th Centuries, the Russian State and the Kalmyk Khanate ===
The rapid consolidation of the Kazakh Khanate, population growth, and the efforts of the early Kazakh khans to expand their territory inevitably led to clashes between the Kazakhs and the Oirats. One of the earliest accounts of relations between Kazakh sultans and Oirat taishis was provided by Seyfi Çelebi: "Beyond the land of Kashgar lives a people called the Kazakhs. They have neither cities nor villages. They are a nomadic people. They number two hundred thousand tents. Their khan is called Tevekkel. They once raided a certain area in the land of the Kalmaks and then returned." Vasily Bartold believed that Taukel Sultan's raid on Oirat encampments took place in 1552. During this period, Oirat pressure on the Kazakh Khanate intensified. According to Kalmyk historians, this was caused by their defeat at the hands of the Mongols under Altan Khan and their subsequent forced retreat westward.

According to Soviet historiography, in the late 16th century, Kazakh rulers inflicted several defeats on the Oirats and established political control over part of them. Russian sources referred to Taukel Khan as the "tsar of the Kazakhs and Kalmaks." Ilya Zlatkin argued that the Kazakhs had managed to subjugate some Oirats living near the borders of Kazakh territory. However, following Taukel's death in 1598, the Oirats refused to recognize the authority of his successors. Nevertheless, some modern researchers — specifically I. I. Dremov and Zh. M. Sabitov — reject the identification of the Kalmaks who submitted to the Kazakh Khan with the Oirats. The historian Dremov writes that historical sources do not confirm the subjugation of the Oirats by the Kazakhs in the second half of the 16th century. It appears that the reference here is not to the Oirat-Kalmyks, but rather to the Kalmaks (turkic people) who inhabited the steppes of the Kazakh region. According to the Kazakhstani historian Sabitov, the Kalmaks—against whom Tauke Khan fought, and whom he and his brother Shah-Muhammad subsequently ruled—were Karakalpaks.

At the beginning of the 17th century, a portion of the Kazakh population fell under the sway of the Oirats. During the 17th century, the Kazakhs lacked a centralized state and lived in a condition of economic and political fragmentation. Consequently, they suffered defeats at the hands of powerful, aggressive neighbors—the Oirats being one such group.

During this period, significant changes took place in Oirat society. Divided among themselves, the Oirats faced pressure from all sides. Khara Khula's attempts to unite them led to the secession of one group, the Torghuts. In the 1620s, under the leadership of Khan Kho Orluk, approximately 200,000–250,000 Torghuts migrated from the Dzungarian Basin to the Ural River and subsequently to the steppes of the Caspian Lowland. Moving northward to bypass Kazakh territories, they fought successfully against the Nogai Horde and the Khanate of Sibir. These western Oirats became known as the Kalmyks. In the 1650s, the Oirats continued moving westward and settled in the Lower Volga region despite rivalry and pressure from the eastern Oirats. This contributed to the emergence of the Kalmyk Khanate, a Buddhist state on the banks of the Volga River. In subsequent raids, the Kalmyks drove the Nogais into the Ciscaucasian steppes.

=== The Formation of the Dzungar Khanate ===
In the mid-1630s, the Oirats, who had been migrating across the vast expanses of Southern and Western Siberia, started to unite under the leadership of Kharkhul from the Choros clan. This group among the Oirat tribes was called "Zün hār" (left wing, or more accurately, the left arm) — the Dzungars. In 1634, after the death of Kharkhul, his son Erdeni took over the leadership of the union. In 1638, the Dalai Lama granted him the title Baghatur Khong Tayiji. The year 1635 is considered the first year the new and powerful state of Mongol-speaking nomads, the Dzungar Khanate, appeared on the ethno-political map of Central Asia. It was considered as the "last great nomadic empire in Central Asia," by Russian historian, Vasily Bartold.

The internal fragmentation of the Kazakh Khanate in the late 16th and early 17th centuries weakened its position and contributed to the rise of a new regional power—the Dzungar Khanate, established in the early 17th century. The first phase of clashes between the Kazakhs and the Dzungars began in 1635, shortly after the formation of the Dzungar state.

== Overview ==
=== Kazakh–Dzungar War (1635–1636) ===
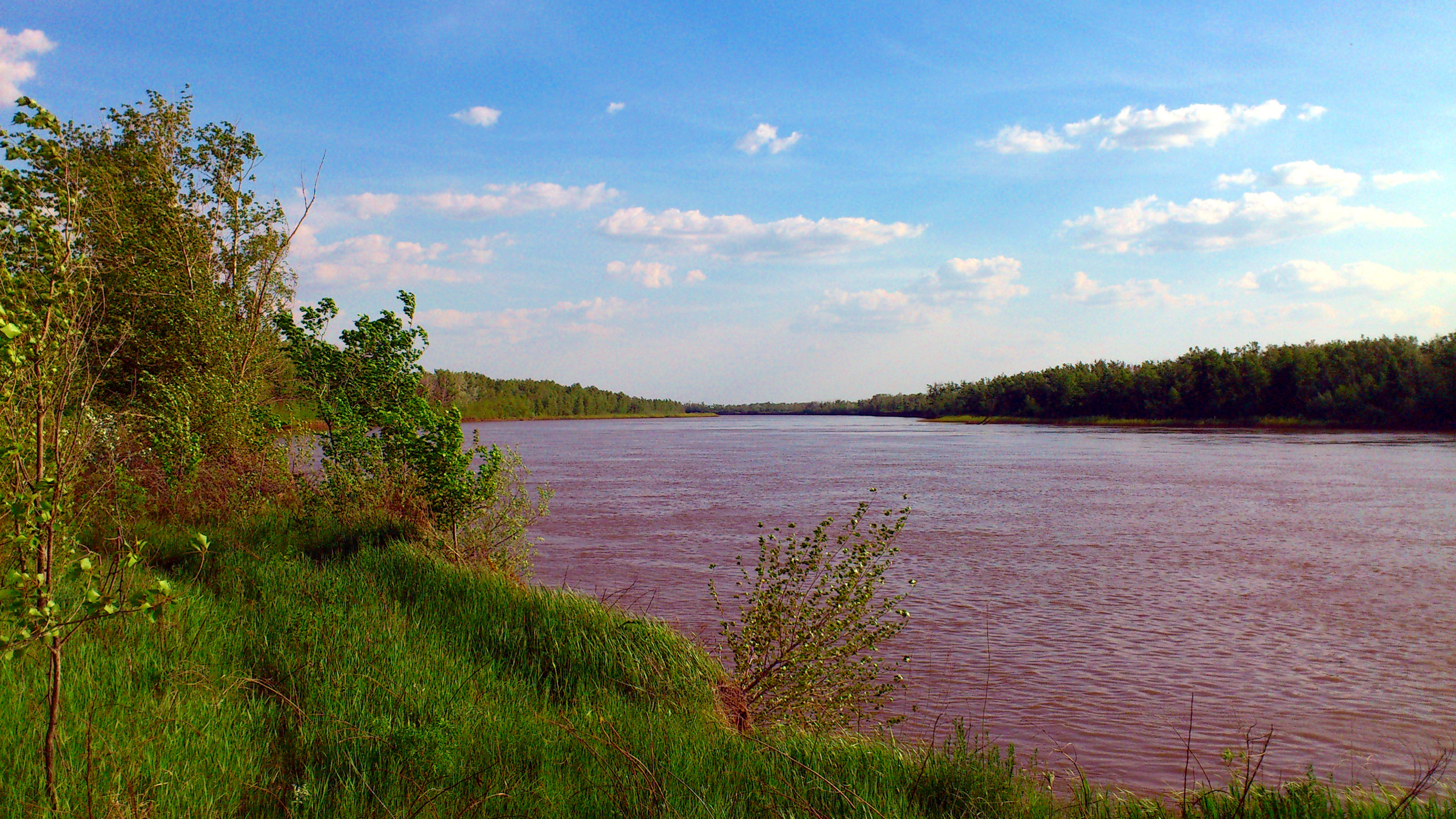
Yaik river

In the spring of 1635, Jangir Sultan, in alliance with a Dörbet-Khoshut group led by Khundelen Taisha, launched a preemptive campaign against the Torghut leader Kho Orluk. This offensive effectively pushed the Torghuts west of the Yaik and Emba rivers. However, the Dzungars launched a swift counter-invasion later that year. Led by Batur Khongtayiji and defecting Oirat chiefs, the Dzungar forces engaged the Kazakhs in a massive battle during the winter of 1635. Although the Kazakhs initially held their ground, they were eventually defeated; many were killed, and Jangir Sultan was captured alive. During this campaign, Dzungar forces also pushed nomadic Naimans from the Ulytau region toward the northwest. The war continued into 1636 with further Dzungar offensives targeting the groups of Janybek Khan beyond the Irtysh River. Despite these setbacks, the Kazakhs launched successful counter-attacks in the following years, eventually securing the release of Jangir Sultan from captivity. This early war set the stage for decades of prolonged military confrontation, prompting Jangir Khan to strengthen defensive alliances with the Khanate of Kashgar, Khanate of Bukhara and Khanate of Khiva.

=== Kazakh–Dzungar War (1643–1647) ===
He soon launched a second Dzungar campaign into Kazakh lands in 1640. This time it was also successful for the Dzungar feudal lords, capturing 16,000 Kazakh-Kyrgyz Tokmaks between the Issyk-Kul Lake and the Chu River.

According to Tursun Sultanov, Jangir's humiliating captivity made him an irreconcilable enemy of the Dzungars, and he devoted the rest of his life to fighting them. In this struggle, Jangir demonstrated personal bravery and military talent, and his name became famous. For his bravery and military successes, people nicknamed him “Salqam Jangir Khan”.

In 1643, an army led by Erdeni Batur invaded Jetisu. The Battle of Orbulaq took place in the Orbulaq River gorge on the Ili River. A detachment of 600 Kazakh warriors led by Jangir Khan held back a 50,000 Dzungar army in a narrow mountain pass for some time. After the Dzungars reached the plain, they engaged a 20,000-strong relief army brought by the Emir of Samarkand, Yalangto'sh Bakhodir. The Dzungar army was stopped, and Erdeni Batur turned back to Dzungaria. This failure led Erdeni to punish those who had not joined the campaign, causing internal unrest in the Dzungar Khanate. He also attempted to organize a joint campaign with the Volga Kalmyks against the Kazakhs, but failed.

In 1645–1646, Erdeni Batur launched a new campaign against the Kazakhs, inflicting heavy casualties and devastation on the Kazakh Khanate. Russian ambassador D. Arshinsky reported that before his arrival at the Dzungar headquarters in May 1646:

“Kontaysha waged war on the Cossack horde of Yangir Tsarevich and killed many people, and took Yangir's brother, his wife, children, and many people captive.”

However, the Oirat-Kazakh War of the 1640s and 1650s ultimately brought victory to the Oirats. In the 1650s, the eastern part of Semirechye, as well as the territory between the upper reaches of the Irtysh and Lake Balkhash, was dependent on the Dzungar Khanate. The headquarters of the Khuntaiji was located on the upper reaches of the Irtysh. Thus, Erdeni Batur significantly expanded the borders of his state.

=== Conflicts of the 1650s ===
In 1652, Dzungar forces launched a campaign against the Buruts (Kyrgyz) and subjugated them. Jangir Khan arrived with his army to assist the Kyrgyz, resulting in a battle that ended in a Dzungar victory. Historians Ilya Zlatkin and Evgeny Kychanov state that during this battle, Galdama, the son of Ochirtu Tsetsen Khan, killed Jangir Khan (Note: referred to by Kychanov as a "Kyrgyz bogatyr') in single combat. However, primary sources make no mention of a duel; only the biography of Zaya Pandita notes only that the 17-year-old Galdama killed Jangir Khan.

Following the death of Batur Khuntaiji in 1653, the Tian Shan Kyrgyz and the Senior Jüz Kazakhs resumed a successful struggle against the Oirat conquerors. One of the Khuntaiji's sons, Ondon, led a punitive expedition of Dzungar forces into Zhetysu.When the expedition failed, he himself was pinsonered.

Tursun Sultanov writes that during Tsetsen Khan's winter campaign of the Year of the Dragon (1652) against the Kyrgyz, the 17-year-old Galdama killed Jangir Khan. This dating of Jangir Khan's death is also predominant in modern Kazakh historiography. However, Shah Mahmud Churas's Tarikh records Jangir's envoy, Yunus Khoja, visiting Moghul ruler Abdullah Khan after the death of Shahbaz Bek (hakim of Yarkand and atalyq), whom Oleg Akimushkin dates to no later than early 1067 AH (1656–1657). Consequently, historian Nurlan Atygaev suggests Jangir was only wounded in 1652 and died after 1656.

In the 1650s, Kalmyk uluses advanced south to the Talas River. According to the biography of Zaya Pandita, a 38,000-strong army of the Khanate of Bukhara led by Abd al-Shukur reached the river in early 1658; this Ashtarkhanid force may have arrived to aid the Kazakhs. Upon learning this, the Kalmyk taisha Galdama—who was alone on the border—gathered 3,000 men and launched a surprise dawn attack, routing the disorganized Bukharan troops and killing Abd al-Shukur.

The Catholic missionary Gerbillon records that during Sengge's reign, Onchon Taisha—an influential son of Batur Khuntaiji and contender for the Dzungar throne—was captured by the Kazakhs. Abandoned by his escort in camp after contracting smallpox, he was taken in and cured by the Kazakhs. After living among them for three years, Onchon revealed his identity, vowed never to fight them again, and was sent back to Dzungaria with an escort of 100 men. Upon reaching the border, he sent messengers to notify his brother Sengge; however, having seized power and married Onchon's wife, Sengge ordered Onchon and his entire escort—likely including the Kazakhs—killed to conceal that he was alive.

After the death of Erdeni Batur, a succession war began in the Dzungar Khanate, which Sengge won. Sengge made friendly relations with the Kazakhs. However, after Sengge was killed in a coup by Zotov Batur and Chechen tayiji.

=== Galdan Boshugtu Khan's expeditions into Jetisu & Syr-Darya (1681-1684) ===
In 1681, Galdan Boshughtu Khan started his campaign on Jetisu and Southern Kazakhstan. Eventually, Galdan arrived to the city of Sayram. He attempted to siege the city of Sayram in 1681, but he failed and later attempted another siege of Sayram in 1683, which failed again. However, he was able to capture two Kazakh sultans as POW (Prisoner of War). In 1684, Galdan's general, Tsewang Rabtan had successfully took the city of Sayram and Galdan had appointed a minister and a military garrison for the city. However, the civilians of Sayram soon revolted and destroyed the Dzungar garrison. Which led to Galdan's return and his recapture of the city, which was reported as a plunder. Galdan later continued his advance to the city of Tashkent. According to Russian ambassadorial reports, Galdan Boshugtu's forces captured 9 cities in the Syr Darya region that had previously recognized the authority of Tauke Khan. Dzungar troops captured cities included Sayram, Mankent, Kharasman, Shymkent (Chimget), Tekek, Baban Yilgan, Kharamurol, and Chinak. The Dzungars bypassed Yasi (Turkestan), as Tauke Khan was stationed there with his main forces. Meanwhile, the residents of Tashkent surrendered and voluntarily recognized the authority of the Oirat khan. The nomads of Desht-i-Kipchak put up fierce resistance, but in the decisive battles, Tauke Khan’s levies were routed, and the Kazakh ruler’s son was taken prisoner and sent to Lhasa as a hostage.

Historian Vladimir Moiseev suggests that sending Tauke's son to the Dalai Lama demonstrated Galdan's political intention to spread Lamaism among the Kazakh nobility. Galdan Boshugtu Khan also led wars against the Kyrgyz people and the people residing on the Fergana Valley, as he led campaigns against them from 1682 to 1685. The conflict also led to the subjugation of the Baraba Tatars and imposed yasak on them. Converting the Baraba Tatars to Orthodox Christianity and becoming Russian subjects to find an excuse not to pay their tribute to the Dzungars. This also led to the uncontested Dzungar rule over the region of Jetisu.

=== Tauke Khan's raids against Galdan Boshugtu Khan (1686–1689) ===
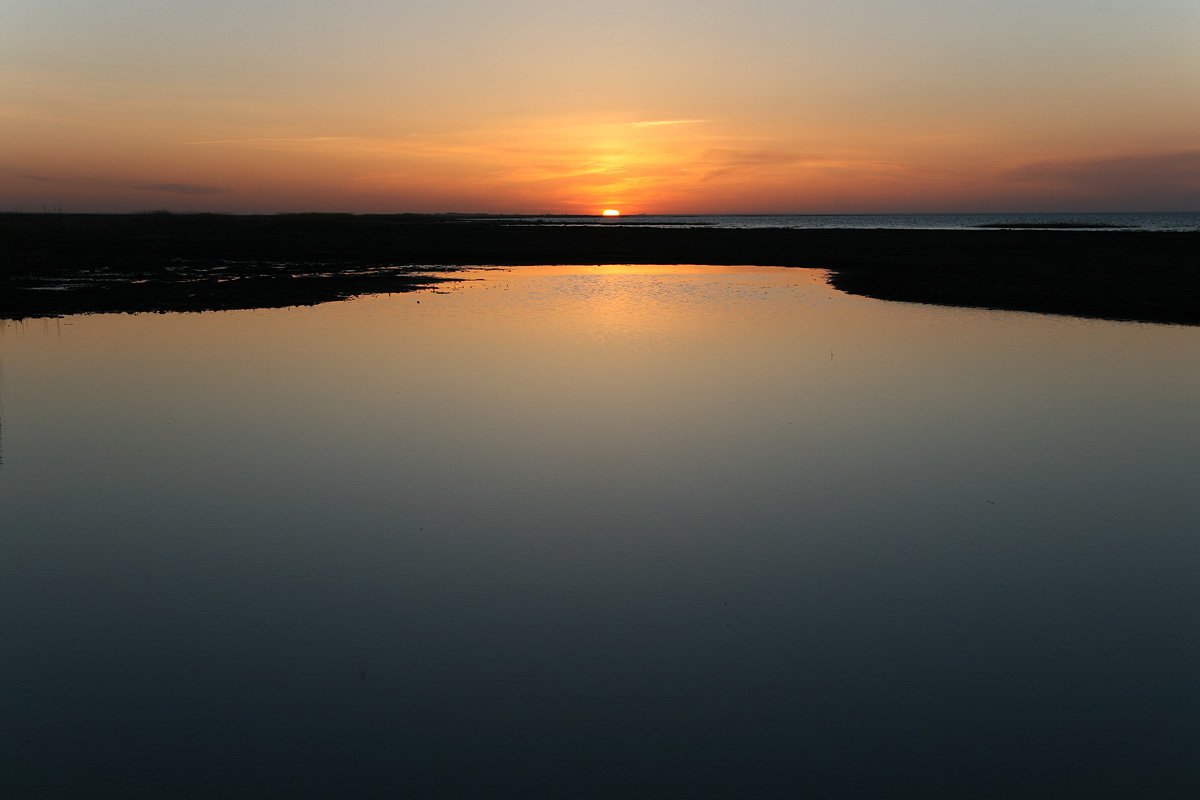
Lake Zaysan

According to Russian ambassadors, in 1687, Tauke Khan received a 10,000-strong army from Subhan Quli Khan of Bukhara, with which he set out on a campaign against the Dzungars of Galdan Boshugtu Khan. The campaign was successful for them, and according to Krasnoyarsk governor I.V. Bashkovskyrom, the Kazakhs expelled Boshugdo Khan from their lands.

Taking advantage of the mobilization of the main forces of the Dzungars to Kalkha in 1688, the Kazakhs attacked the Oirat nomads. The Kyrgyz also fought on the side of the Oirats in the battles with the Kazakhs, and many Kyrgyz nobles were killed in these battles. Military operations in 1688 proved successful, as the bulk of the Dzungar forces was diverted by the war with the Eastern Mongols. Tauke Khan managed to inflict a series of defeats on the enemy and recapture Tashkent, which had previously been seized by the Dzungars By the end of the year, the voivode of Krasnoyarsk reported that, according to his information, "...the Kazakh Horde drove the Kalmyk Taisha Boshugtu Khan off his lands..." Notably, Galdan's own nephew, Chokur, fought against him as part of the Kazakh forces. After his father was killed by Galdan, Chokur found refuge with Tauke Khan, who likely planned to install him as the ruler of the Dzungar Khanate, though this plan ultimately failed.

In 1689, a coalition of the Kazakh Khanate under Tauke Khan, Ochiroi Khan, and Zanbazar Lama launched a major offensive into the Dzungar rear while Galdan Boshugtu Khan was campaigning in the east. The alliance devastated Galdan's western territories, devastated many of his uluses, and took many people captive . Russian reports noted that Galdan's whereabouts and remaining forces became completely unknown, effectively rendering him missing in action in the region. In the same year, the Kazakhs destroyed the Boshugdokhan-kid temple near Zaisan, and after that, this flourishing temple ceased to exist.

This invasion forced Galdan to face a multi-front war, significantly weakening his position during his conflict with the Qing dynasty. At the time, Galdan's whereabouts were unknown to Russian officials, leading to reports that he had been effectively displaced from his primary territories. This contributed to the First Dzungar–Qing War. Galdan was defeated and died in 1697. His death marked a new stage in relations between the Dzungars and the Kazakhs.

=== Kazakh–Dzungar War (1698–1703) ===
At the beginning of the 18th century, a struggle broke out between Kazakh associations and the troops of the Dzungar khan, Tsewang Rabtan, for control over the oases and trade and craft centers of southern Kazakhstan. In 1698, a 40,000-strong Dzungar army defeated the Kazakh uluses of the Senior jüz, who roamed the Chu and Talas rivers. Several thousand people were killed and 10,000 prisoners were taken.

In a letter to the Kangxi Emperor, Tsewang Rabtan justified his wars against the Kazakhs. He claimed that (1) Tauke demanded the return of his son, captured earlier by Galdan's troops; Tsewang Rabtan agreed and sent him home with a guard of 500 soldiers, but Tauke killed the guards mnd seized Uerhude Batur-Tayiji and more than 100 Uriankhai people with their families; (2) the Kazakhs attacked the caravan of thedaughter of Ayuka Khan, who had been married to the Dzungar khan; and (3) returning merchants of Tsewang Rabtan were raided and sacked by Kazakh bandits.

In 1702, the Kazakhs retaliated for the attack of 1698 and also attacked the Kalmyks and Dzungars, but the campaign failed. In 1703, Tauke Khan and Kaip Khan sent an ambassador to negotiate a ceasefire. It is unknown whether an agreement was reached, but in the following years there were no major clashes.

=== Kazakh–Dzungar War (1708–1714) ===
In 1708, a small Dzungar force invaded the territory of the Senior jüz, and the Kazakhs withdrew toward Tashkent. The advance units of the Dzungar troops reached the Sarysu River in Central Kazakhstan. This led to the first kurultai (Note: A kurultai was an assembly of nomadic leaders.) in the summer of 1710 in the Karakum. The kurultai decided to appoint Bogenbay Batyr to lead a Kazakh militia.

Bogenbay developed a plan to repel the enemy. Subsequently, the Kazakhs dealt a series of heavy blows to the Dzungars. Thanks to the unity achieved and coordinated military actions, the Kazakh militias were able to win several victories over the Dzungars in 1711–1712. (according to other sources, in 1712, 1713–1714

"... In the third year, the Khazaks [Kazakhs], making raids, completely ruined many border settlements, killed many people, and took women and children captive... Last year, Duler, the prince of Zaysan, who was opposed to them with three thousand men, suffered defeat and returned with great losses."

Military failures in the struggle against the Kazakhs, accompanied by natural disasters, livestock losses, and famine in Dzungaria, undermined the authority of Tsewang Rabtan. Despite these internal difficulties, at the beginning of the second decade of the 18th century, the Dzungar Khanate intensified its foreign policy. Tsewang Rabtan restored control over East Turkestan, subjugating the cities of Yarkand, Turfan, Kashgar, Aksu, and others. He brought the khans and beys to his court, levying tribute on the cities. Part of the nobility was relocated to Dzungaria and required to engage in agriculture. According to the Russian envoy Ivan Unkovsky, there were about two thousand Bukharans at the Khuntaiji’s court.

The Dzungars could not wage a two-front war—against the Kazakhs and East Turkestan simultaneously. Thanks to internal conflicts among the Uyghurs and hostilities between Kashgar and Yarkand, Tsewang Rabtan was able to establish control over Turkestan. Dzungar diplomats told Qing envoys: "We are surrounded by enemies on all sides, on one side the Hasaki (Kazakhs), on the other the Buruts (Kyrgyz)... Everywhere large detachments are needed for the guards, and moreover annually… who knows how our kingdom will endure?" Tsewang Rabtan intended to personally lead an army against the Kazakhs. However, military clashes with the Qing postponed these plans. Consolidating power in Turkestan allowed Tsewang Rabtan not only to increase pressure on the Kazakhs but also to undertake the 1717 expedition to Tibet and to enter into a dispute with the Qing Empire over control of Hami.

In 1714, the Kazakhs under Abul Khair invaded the border of the Dzungar Khanate. In response, Tsewang Rabtan launched operations through the territories of the Kyrgyz on the Tian Shan.

In 1715, the Qing emperor appealed to Kyrgyz and Kazakh leaders with a proposal to "punish" the Dzungar khan. The Kyrgyz and Kazakhs became active in Eastern Turkestan, but the Dzungars withstood these clashes. After capturing Hami by 1715, Tsewang Rabtan sent troops to the Kazakh steppes in 1716. The Dzungar army under Tseren-Dondook defeated the Kazakh militia and captured many prisoners. In the same year, Kazakh militias attacked the Choros on the Ili River and captured Lieutenant Markel Trubnikov.

Tawke Khan died either in 1715 or in 1718. The period of Tawke Khan's rule is commonly associated with the "Golden Age" of the Kazakh Khanate, when "the people lived in peace, order prevailed, and laws and justice were upheld". This era is also regarded as the last major revival of the medieval Kazakh state. After his death, the so-called (“kelte khans”) (“minor khans”) rose to prominence, and each of the three Zhuzes came to be ruled by its own khans.

The period of Tawke Khan's rule is commonly associated with the “Golden Age” of the Kazakh Khanate, when “the people lived in peace, order prevailed, and laws and justice were upheld”. This era is also regarded as the last major revival of the medieval Kazakh state.

The Kazakh militia then launched another campaign against the Dzungars, but it failed. Because of disagreements between Kaip Khan and Abul Khair Khan, the Kazakhs suffered losses and retreated. At this time, Kazakh leaders began negotiations with the Siberian governor M. P. Gagarin on joint action against the Dzungars. However, while the Siberian administration encouraged resistance, it avoided a full Kazakh–Russian military alliance.

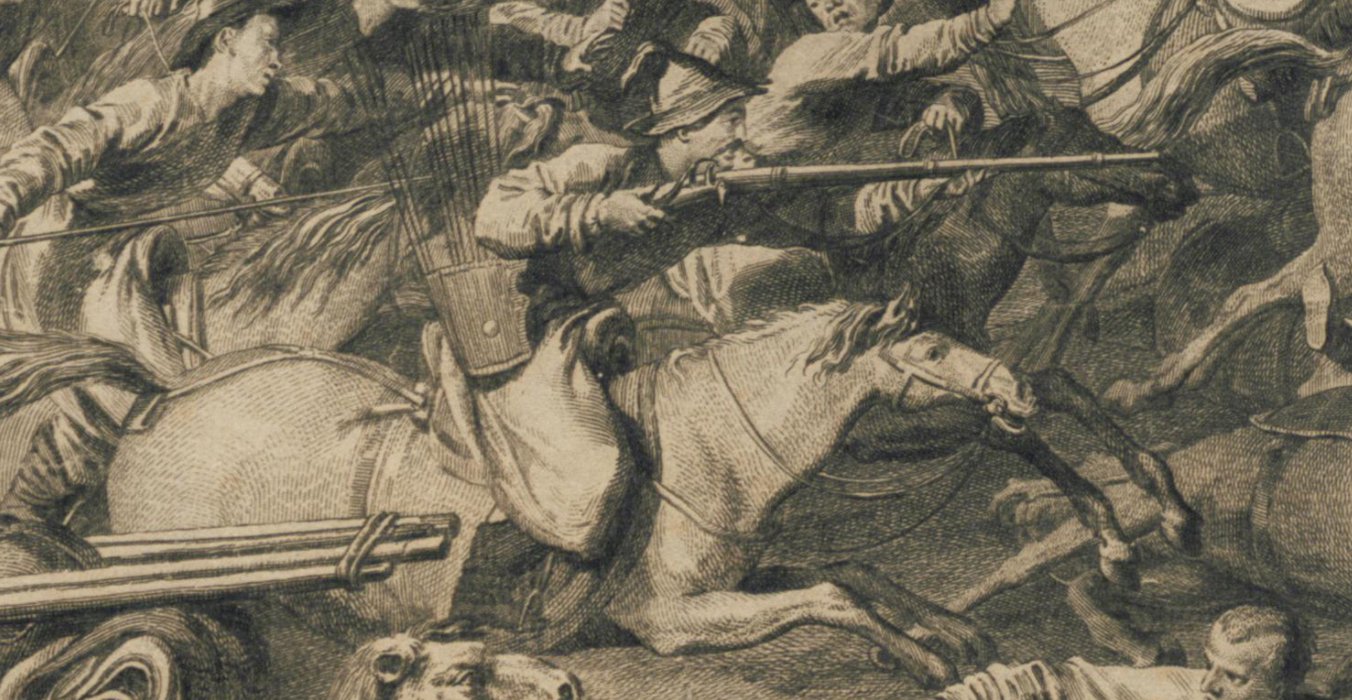
Dzungar cavalry.

As early as September 1716, Kazakh envoys arrived from Kaip Khan in Tobolsk to Governor-General M. P. Gagarin, declaring their readiness to participate in a joint Kazakh-Russian campaign against the Dzungars. Russian documents from 1716 clearly show the desire of the Kazakh rulers, and above all Kaip Khan, to secure military support from the Russian administration in Siberia. At the same time, the Russian government was trying to use the armed forces of the Kazakh Khanate against the Dzungar expansion. However, these negotiations yielded virtually no results.

In 1717–1718, Khans Kaip and Abulkhair attempted to conclude an anti-Dzungar alliance with Peter I, largely due to the influence of Siberian Governor M. P. Gagarin, who in his letters pointed to the Dzungar Khuntaiji's plans for conquest in neighboring regions of Eurasia and insisted that the rulers seek support from the Russian government. However, the Russian government did not support the idea of a joint campaign against the Dzungar Khanate, considering it an important counterweight to the growing power of the Qing Empire and counting on the possibility of its peaceful annexation to Russia. Therefore, St. Petersburg limited itself to encouraging comments, without giving the Kazakh khans any specific promises of military assistance.

However, Russia's refusal was not dictated by the political or military weakness of the Kazakhs, as V. Ya. Basin suggested. The Kazakh zhuzes represented a significant military force in Central Asia. Thus, in one of his reports, A. I. Tevkelev noted that the Kazakh people "do not yet know their own strength." The Dzungar Khanate was seen by St. Petersburg as a convenient buffer against the Qing Empire, and the ruling circles sought to maintain peaceful relations with it, hoping to eventually bring it under Russian rule.

In the same year, Dzungar troops defeated a Kazakh militia of 30,000 men at the Battle of the Ayagoz River. The Dzungars built wooden trenches and fortifications to hold their position until reinforcements arrived. A reinforcement of about 1,500 men then arrived and defeated the Kazakh army. In the spring of 1718, the Dzungars made a swift march from Jetisu to the Arys and Chayan rivers, seeking to capture Turkistan, the headquarters of the Kazakh khans. Several battles took place, with the Dzungars reportedly "cutting down the Kazakh horde".

After the Second Dzungar–Qing War began, the Dzungar offensive ended. This allowed the Kazakhs to recover territory and capture about 3,000 Dzungar prisoners. The Russian ambassador to the Dzungar Khanate, I. D. Cheredov, reported that in 1720, "the Cossack horde approached and captured about three thousand people, whom they took with them."

In the second decade of the 18th century, military tensions in southern and western Kazakhstan intensified: constant clashes with the Dzungars exacerbated the struggle for pastures and undermined trade relations. Under these conditions, conflicts between the Kazakhs and the Kalmyks, Bashkirs, as well as the Yaik Cossacks and Siberian Cossacks became more frequent. Particularly acute were the clashes between the Junior Zhuz and the Yaik Cossacks and Kalmyks, accompanied by cattle rustling and the capture of people; some of the captives were then resold in the markets of Khiva. Kazakh troops also made raids on Bashkir nomadic camps and Russian border settlements in the Volga region and the Urals, which led to retaliatory attacks and prisoner exchanges.

In the spring of 1721, the Dzungar Khanate was threatened with defeat by the Qing Empire. In an effort to secure support, Tsewang Rabtan sent an embassy headed by Borokurgan to St. Petersburg, offering to submit to Russian rule in exchange for rapid military assistance against the Manchu-Chinese troops. However, the situation changed after the death of Emperor Kangxi in December 1722. His successor, Yongzheng, ordered the withdrawal of troops and initiated peace negotiations. Tsewang Rabtan readily agreed and sent representatives to Beijing, abandoning the idea of becoming a Russian subject.

=== Kazakh-Dzungar War (1723–1730) ===
In 1723, the Dzungar Khanate invaded the Kazakh Khanate after the Kazakhs suffered a harsh winter. Many Kazakhs were preparing to migrate to summer pastures and were busy with seasonal economic work, including the castration of young animals. The Dzungar troops attacked suddenly, and the rulers of the Junior and Middle jüzes did not expect the threat. Tsewang Rabtan sent more than 30,000 troops under the command of his son Lobsangsür, defeating the Kazakhs at Sayram, Tashkent, and Khara-Murut. Other forces campaigned in the Talas and Arys valleys. Many people were killed or captured, and nomadic settlements and towns were attacked. In the same year, the Dzungars captured Turkistan and took the family of Abul Khair prisoner. They also captured Khujand, Samarkand, and Andijan, occupying the Fergana Valley. These years became known in Kazakh history as the "Barefooted Flight" (Ақтабан Шұбырынды, Алқакөл сұлама). It is often compared to the Mongol invasion of the 13th century: many Kazakh clans fled southern Kazakhstan, with the Senior Jüz and part of the Middle Jüz retreating toward Tashkent, Khujand, the Kara-tegin and Fergana regions, and as far as the Pamirs; most of the Middle Jüz went to Samarkand; and the Junior Jüz fled toward Khiva and Bukhara.

In late winter 1724, the Dzungars launched a second attack along the Chu River, striking the wintering quarters of the Senior Jüz. The Argyns and Jalairs were driven out of the Chu Valley, and trading centers on the northern Karatau were captured, plundered, and destroyed, including the city of Sozak. Some Kazakhs fled to the Betpak-Dala desert and the Balkhash steppe, while others retreated to the Karatau Mountains and used mountain gorges as fortresses. The first two attacks did not affect the Junior Jüz.

In 1724, Abul Khair Khan returned from the Northern Campaigns and captured Turkistan. In June 1725, the Turkmen Usman reported to the Astrakhan governor a clash between Abulkhair's 50,000-strong army and the forces of the Khuntaiji. It was reported that, having lost 10,000 humans in the battle, the remnants of the Kazakh forces moved toward the Emba River. After Abulkhair's retreat, the Dzungars recaptured the cities along the Syr Darya. As a result, the Kazakhs lost access to the trade and craft centers of Central Asia, triggering a mass exodus of the Kazakh population to the north and northwest of Kazakhstan.

Kazakh historian Irina Yerofeyeva writes that between 1727 and 1730, the united Kazakh militia won a series of battles—both major and minor—against the Dzungars; however, documentary evidence of these engagements is almost entirely lacking, and information about them has survived only in Kazakh oral traditions recorded and published by 19th- and 20th-century researchers such as A. I. Levshin, A. A. Divaev, and M. Tynyshpayev. Consequently, the dating and circumstances of specific battles remain approximate and may be refined in the future.

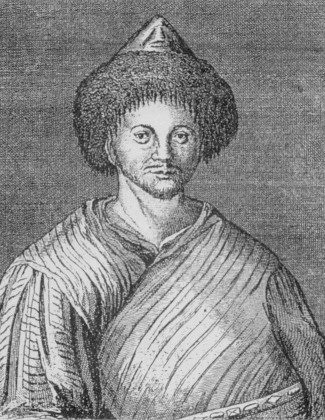
Portrait of Abul Khair Khan.

In 1726, representatives of the Kazakh jüzes met in Ordabasy near Turkistan and decided to organize another militia, agreeing to appoint Abul Khair, khan of the Junior Jüz, as commander. After the meeting, forces led by Abul Khair Khan and Bogenbay Batyr fought the Dzungars at the Battle of Bulanty near Ulytau in the Karasyir area. This was the first major Kazakh victory in many years and had strong moral and strategic impact. The terrain was later called "Kalma қırılғan" – "a place where the Kalmaks were exterminated".

In 1727, Tsewang Rabtan died, causing a succession struggle between Galdan Tseren and Lobsangsür. Galdan Tseren won and killed Lobsangsür. This gave the Kazakhs an opportunity to consolidate their forces. On 6 November 1728, the khan of the Middle Jüz, Semeke, sent an embassy to the Volga Kalmyks for peace talks to secure his western rear and allow the Kazakhs to focus against the Dzungar Khanate.

Another kurultai took place in 1728, again agreeing to appoint Abul Khair as commander of a united Kazakh militia. The last major battle between the Kazakh militia and the Dzungar army took place about 120 km from Lake Balkhash in the Anrakai area. (Note: According to a comparative analysis of Kazakh folk toponymy and historical legends by Mukhamedzhan Tynyshpaev, the main directions of Kazakh attacks were: Senior Jüz forces crossing the Keles–Badam range west of Mount Kazykurt; Middle Jüz forces advancing north of that area; and Junior Jüz forces advancing along the western slope of the Karatau Mountains.) Moiseev dates the Battle of Anrakai to 1729, while Kadyrbaev suggests 1729 or spring 1730. Kazakh cavalry repeatedly charged at enemy forces led by Abilmambet, Barak, Abylai, and others.

In 1729, Galdan Tseren requested the Russian Empire to form a coalition against the Kazakhs. He asked the Russian envoy M. Etigerov:

"Are they not attacking the Cossacks [Kazakhs] on your side?"

The Siberian administration rejected this proposed alliance. Soon after the Battle of Anrakai, a civil conflict began among Abulmambet, Sameke, and Abul Khair over the question of a supreme khan. This led the forces of the Junior and Middle jüzes to leave the theater of military operations. In the summer of 1730, Kazakh forces captured about a thousand Dörbet yurts with their livestock.

=== 1731–1734 ===
After the Battle of Anirakai, both sides concluded their own peace treaties, but border conflicts and periodic Kazakh raids on the Dzungars continued.

Abul Khair Khan urgently leaving for the northern nomadic camps of the Lesser Juz, carried out certain mobilization work to repel possible armed attacks by the Oirats, and, as some historical documents of those years indicate, even in his absence, entrusted the command of large military forces in the southern regions of Kazakhstan to his younger brother Sultan Bulkhair and gave 70,000 troops to his younger brother Bulkhair. A series of military operations to dispel the threat of the remnants of the Dzungarian hordes. In the autumn of 1731, Kazakh troops made a deep raid into the heart of Dzungaria. Khalkhas who had escaped from Dzungar captivity reported to the Russians that when Oirat troops advanced to meet the Qing armies in 1730. Then Kazakhs raided ulues of Khong Tayiji captured many peoples women and children, more than thousand kibitka (all) or more head of cattle and belongings. Kazakh forces also raided the Altai Mountains, and 10,000 Dzungar troops were sent to guard nearby border areas.

In winter 1731, Kazakh raiders attacked a Dzungar trade caravan and captured a Russian convoy and Uyghur merchants. Because the raiders were aware of Russo–Dzungar relations, they released the Russian convoy but kept the Uyghur merchants. Prisoner issues were later resolved in a relatively humane manner.

In response to planned Kazakh offensives, a 7,000-strong Dzungar force attacked the Middle Jüz in summer 1732 but was repelled. In the same year, 700 Dzungar families were captured. The invasion was significant enough to prevent a traditional meeting of Middle Jüz nobility that year.

In May 1733, a Dzungar tayiji named Tsagan arrived in Semipalatinsk with a formal request for Russian troops to jointly "destroy the Cossack (Kazakh) horde." Russian commanders refused, stating they could not provide assistance without higher orders, especially without open conflict with the Kazakhs.

Because of the war with the Qing dynasty, the Dzungars withdrew forces from southern Kazakhstan. In 1734, I. K. Kirilov and A. I. Tevkelev reported to the Collegium of Foreign Affairs that the khan of the Senior Jüz:

"had taken possession of the former cities of Tashkent and others, which had previously been conquered by the former Dzungar ruler, the khongtaiji, but which his son Galdan Tseren had abandoned because of the war with China… and now they hold them peacefully, and the Dzungar Kalmyks have sent envoys to them seeking to live in peace."

Other sources indicate that the Senior Jüz remained independent. In one conversation with A. I. Tevkelev, the elder of the Junior Jüz, Bukenbay, stated that:

"they, the Kirghiz-Kaisaks [Kazakhs], formerly possessed cities, namely Tashkent, Turkestan, and Sairam, together with their dependent towns and villages, and these were held by the Kirghiz-Kaisak khans and elders. In those cities lived the Sarts, that is, townspeople, from whom they collected tribute. The Khong Tayiji expelled them from those cities fifteen years ago [apparently five years ago], and now no one controls them and no tribute is collected; they live without administration…"

=== Conquest of the Senior Jüz (1735) ===
After concluding peace with the Qing Empire, Galdan Tseren established his rule over the Senior Jüz in 1735. The feudal lords of the Senior Jüz were forced to send hostages to Urga every year, and the population had to pay a tax of one steppe fox skin per family per year. Simultaneously with the invasion of the territory of the Senior Jüz and Central Asia, the Dzungar feudal lords invaded the border nomadic lands of the Middle Jüz. This is evidenced, in particular, by the testimony of soldier Ivan Khoroshkov. The Dzungars told him that they had gone on a campaign against the Middle Jüz,

"and defeated several Cossack uluses and took a hundred men captive from the Cossack horde, and drove away ten thousand horses and a hundred camels... There were no Cossack [Kazakh] Hordes fortresses near the Irtysh, and those that were there were all destroyed, while the rest scattered."

Moiseev notes that Levshin linked Galdan Tseren's capture of the Senior Jüz and the cities of Prisyrind to blocking incorporation into Russia, while Moiseev emphasizes border security and revenue as motives.

=== Kazakh–Dzungar War (1739–1741) ===
After the annexation of Khalkha, Tibet, and Kukunor, it became clear to the Dzungarian feudal lords that they lacked the strength not only to unite the Mongol world but also to successfully resist the Qing Empire in Central Asia. For this reason, in the late 1730s, their military-political activity turned westward. In the second half of the 1730s, the Dzungar leadership was preparing a large-scale campaign into Kazakhstan with the aim of subjugating the Middle Jüz. The Middle Jüz of the Kazakhs was the most numerous and powerful. Preparation for the large-scale invasion of its territory had been underway for several years. However, as long as peace had not been concluded with the Qing Empire, Galdan Tseren did not risk starting military actions. According to reports to the Orenburg authorities, the invasion of Kazakhstan was scheduled for the spring of 1738. However, due to the winter and unfinished negotiations, these plans were disrupted. Some of the rulers of the Junior and Middle Jüz during the struggle with the Dzungar Khanate accepted Russian protectorate. According to historian Moiseev, this was done to secure their possessions from Russia. The Russian government, in turn, sought to use the Kazakhs to protect Siberia from possible invasions by the Dzungars and to gain an ally in the Kazakh militias.

Seeking to conceal the expansionist nature of his policy in Kazakhstan, Galdan Tseren instructed the envoys sent in 1740 to present military actions against the Kazakhs as a form of “just retribution” for their raids. The envoys Lama-Dorji and Nauruz-bai met with the Siberian governor Pyotr Ivanovich Buturlin on 8 January 1741 and explained that “one third of the Kazakh Horde” was under the authority of Galdan Tseren and loyal to him. However, the remaining “two thirds” were independent and, “by their natural custom, engaged in theft.” According to the envoys, the cause of the conflict was blood revenge, since the Kazakhs had killed a relative of Galdan Tseren and had also repeatedly attacked his subjects, killing them and driving off livestock.

In the second half of the 1730s, Galdan Tseren was preparing a major campaign aimed at subjugating the Middle Jüz, which at that time was coming under increasing Russian influence. Accordingly, in 1737–1738, the College of Foreign Affairs and the Military Collegium received reports that the Dzungar command was withdrawing troops from Khalkha and Eastern Turkestan and concentrating them near the borders of the Middle Jüz along the Irtysh defensive line. In 1738, the Siberian governor Pyotr Ivanovich Buturlin reported that an eight-thousand-strong Dzungar detachment had appeared in the Altai Mountains in the area of the Kan River. Earlier, in the spring of 1735, Bogenbay Batyr conveyed to the Russian authorities information obtained from prisoners stating that, after concluding peace with the Qing Empire, Galdan Tseren intended to send a force of up to 20,000 troops against the Middle Jüz.

Despite the fact that Galdan Tseren's plans to attack the Middle Jüz were known to the Kazakhs, the batyrs of the Middle Jüz, (Note: Bogenbay, Eset, Altai) with a force of two thousand men, joined in 1738 the campaign of the Younger Jüz against the Volga Kalmyks.

In the spring of 1739, 24,000 Dzungar cavalrymen attacked the lands of the Middle Jüz in two strike columns. (Note: As reported by Bashkirs who had escaped from Kazakh captivity, Khan Galdan Tseren “assembled a great army … numbering 24,000 men and, dividing it into two parts, cut down five volosts of the Kirghiz-Kaisaks: Kanzhygaly, Karagul, Yatamanlimai, Uvatsk, and Kerensk, and drove off 50,000 sheep.” The Dzungar forces were commanded by the khan’s uncle Tseren-Dondob, while separate detachments under the leadership of the noyon Septeni, stationed near the southern section of the Irtysh defensive line, carried out predatory raids on the nomadic camps of the Middle Juz.) Which the Kazakhs were unable to repel the Dzungar invasion, as they were engaged in preparations for raids against the Kalmyk Khanate and the Bashkirs. Mobilization measures in the Middle Jüz began only after the Dzungar attack. The Senior Jüz, which was in political dependence on Dzungaria, remained neutral. The Junior Jüz also maintained neutrality. According to Moiseev, the khan of the Younger Jüz, Abulkhair, was absorbed by the Khivan question, attempting to seize the throne of the Khiva Khanate.

The disunity of the Kazakh jüzes gave Galdan Tseren reason to believe that they would be unable to offer serious resistance to his armies. (Note: According to N. Ya. Bichurin, “after concluding peace with the Central State, Galdan Tseren decided to punish the Kirghiz-Kazakhs, who, taking advantage of his previously difficult situation in the east, had carried out raids on the western frontiers of Dzungaria”.)

Fearing a new invasion, in September 1740 the Russian government instructed the Orenburg Commission to strengthen precautionary measures, and Sultan Barak and other rulers to supply the troops with gunpowder and other necessary provisions (with the exception of artillery and firearms). However, already in the autumn of the same year, Dzungar detachments resumed attacks on Kazakh auls.

At the end of 1739 and in the first half of 1740, the Dzungars undertook another offensive against the Kazakhs. The leaders of the Kazakh militia carried out preparations in advance and offered determined resistance, with Kazakh forces delivering a number of pre-emptive strikes against the Dzungars. Despite some initial setbacks, the Dzungar troops encountered organized resistance from Kazakh warriors and militiamen. According to the testimony of Abyz Baibulatov, “two thousand Kazakhs under the leadership of Abdulmamet advanced against the Kalmyks of Galdan Tseren.” Fighting with varying success continued until the winter of 1741. Dzungar commanders attempted to cut off the Kazakhs’ routes to Russian fortresses and to the Baraba Steppe. In a conversation with Lieutenant Proskuryakov, the Dzungar commander-in-chief openly stated his intention “to send two thousand Kalmyks to Baraba to search for the enemies of the Kazakh Horde.” A representative of Septen who arrived at the Yamyshevsk Fortress confirmed that a movement was planned “down the Irtysh toward the Yamyshev side and on to the Om in order to eradicate the Kazakh Horde”.

In 1740, a Dzungar embassy arrived in Russia, formally sent to congratulate Empress Anna Ioannovna. However, scholars note that its primary purpose was to ascertain St Petersburg's position regarding the impending war against the Kazakhs. The envoys inquired about the size and locations of the nomadic camps of Kazakh clans and sought to secure a ban on their crossing beyond the line of Russian fortresses. During the negotiations, Pyotr Buturlin assured the Dzungar representatives that Russian garrisons had received orders to strengthen security and to prevent Kazakhs from crossing the fortified line. Encouraged by these assurances, the Dzungar envoys openly declared to the Siberian governor their intention to begin attacks on Kazakh uluses from 15 February 1741. In response to Russian concerns over the presence of Dzungar troops near the border and their crossing to the left bank of the Irtysh, the envoys stated that this had been forced by the actions of the Dzungar command, since the Kazakhs had burned the grass in areas designated for the deployment of troops.

The regional situation in the early 1740s developed in favor of the Dzungar Khanate. The Russian administration in Siberia, in effect, did not obstruct Galdan Tseren's actions against the Middle Jüz, while the Qing court at that time took no steps against Dzungaria. Contradictions among Kazakh rulers persisted, and the elite of the Younger Jüz as well as some sultans of the Middle Jüz continued clashes with the Volga Kalmyks. In a report of the Orenburg Commission dated 26 August 1741 to the College of Foreign Affairs, it was stated that these skirmishes occurred “apparently not only in order to avenge their grievances, but also to compensate for the devastation inflicted upon them by the Dzungars.” Large Kazakh forces under the leadership of Abilmambet Khan, Kuchuk, Sultan Barak, and the batyrs Imet, Zhanibek, and others took part in these engagements.

The pretext for a new Dzungar campaign was provided by attacks on Dzungaria carried out by Sultan Barak and Karasakal. The latter, having fled from Bashkiria and having passed himself off as Lobsangsür, the son of Tsewang Rabdan who had died in Kalmykia, sought to secure the support of Kazakh rulers in order to restore his claims to the throne. One source noted: “The Kirghiz, being the age-old enemies of the Dzungars, readily gathered around the renowned leader, who, in the event of success, could become a good neighbor and a friend to the Kirghiz [Kazakh]”.

In late February 1741, a Dzungar army of about 30,000 men under the command of Septen and Galdan Tseren's eldest son, Lama-Dorji, invaded the nomadic lands of the Middle Jüz. The offensive was conducted along three axes: along the Ishim River, from Tashkent, and from Turkestan. Khan Abilmambet retreated toward Orenburg; however, his ulus was attacked, and he was left with only about thirty kibitkas. In March, Khan Abulkhair reported to V. A. Urusov that “the Dzungars have surrounded us on all sides” and requested the construction of a fortress in his nomadic lands. His envoys, Kutyr-batyr and Baibek, also petitioned for the establishment of a fortification on the Syr Darya. Many Kazakh encampments were completely destroyed, and livestock and people were driven off to Dzungaria. According to a report by the Dzungar envoy Galzat, Septen's army returned with three thousand captives, among whom was Sultan Ablai with two hundred warriors. Other sultans and batyrs were also taken captive (Note: Barak and Durgun, as well as the batyrs Atykmash and Kobutygan.)

Despite these successes, the Dzungars failed to achieve their main goal—to defeat the main forces of the Middle Jüz and destroy its population. The bulk of the Kazakh uluses migrated beyond the Tobol River, after which their enemies sent a guide from among the prisoners to follow them. He deliberately led them through frost and snow, causing many to freeze to death. The enraged Dzungars burned him and, abandoning their further advance, returned. And to indicate the other such Cossack hordes, the captive comrade led them, the Kalmyks of the Cossack horde, and he deliberately led them astray and caused great snow and frost, because he was a heretic, and because of that, the Kalmyks barely escaped, and several died from the cold, and so they, the Kalmyks burned that heretic thief and went back to attack the Cossack dwellings, which were apparently very crowded, but because of the above-mentioned loss of their people from the frost, they did not dare to attack them and so they returned.". About 15,000 soldiers returned with Septem, while the other detachments continued to operate separately, "behind rocks and close to Kirghiz (Kazakh) dwellings.".

Attempts by the Dzungar command to strike from the south also ended in failure. According to a Yenisei Kyrgyz who escaped from captivity, "the Cossack horde fought against the Kalmyk forces last winter... and the Cossack horde defeated the Kalmyk forces and killed many of them on the right wing." The batyr Olzhabay distinguished himself in these battles, and folk legends and songs refer to him as the victor over Galdan Tseren. Kazakh troops also made several incursions into the territory of the Dzungar Khanate, defeating the right wing of the Dzungar army and crushing the ulus of Septen.

At the end of February 1741, a thirty-thousand-strong Oirat army under the command of Septen and Galdan-Tseren's eldest son, Lama-Dorji, invaded the nomadic camps of the Middle Zhuz. The offensive was conducted in three directions: along the Ishim, from Tashkent, and from Turkestan. Khan Abilmambet retreated to Orenburg, but his ulus was attacked, and only about thirty kibitkas remained. In March, Khan Abulkhair reported to V. A. Urusov that "the Dzungars have surrounded us from all sides" and requested the construction of a fortress in his nomadic camps. His envoys Kutyr-batyr and Baibek also petitioned for the construction of a fortification on the Syr Darya. Many Kazakh nomadic camps were completely destroyed, and their livestock and people were driven to Dzungaria. According to a report from the Oirat envoy Galzat, Septen's army returned with three thousand prisoners, including Sultan Abylai and two hundred warriors. Sultans and batyrs were also captured.

In May 1741, the last Kazakh-Dzungar war ended. Despite some victories for the Kazakhs, who were also fighting the Volga Kalmyks at the time, they suffered defeat.

However, in 1742, hostilities resumed. In the spring, the Oirats launched a campaign against the Syr Darya. As a result of the military campaign of 1741–1742, a significant portion of the territory and population of the Middle Zhuz fell under the control of Dzungaria. Sultan Abylai was captured. Sultans Barak, Batyr, and several others defected to the victors, offering hostages and promising to pay tribute. Abilmambet Khan and his inner circle were also inclined to offer their sons as hostages and pay tribute. I. Neplyuev reported to the State Collegium of Foreign Affairs that Galdan-Tseren, through his ambassadors, was demanding both hostages and tribute from Abilmambet and the noble sultans of the Middle Zhuz. Otherwise, he threatened a new war.

The Khan of the Middle Zhuz Abulmambet and the sultans Ablai, Abulfeiz, and Niyaz were also forced to send hostages to Dzungaria. The Russian lieutenant D. Gladyshev, who returned from a trip to Abulkhair in Orenburg in the spring of 1742, reported on a meeting of the nobility of the Younger Zhuz, at which a decision was made to recognize the citizenship of the Dzungar khuntaiji. Soon, the Khan of the Younger Zhuz Abulkhair also sent his son to Dzungaria.

== Aftermath ==
After the death of Galdan Tseren in 1745, a civil war began. Amursana sought Qing support, contributing to the collapse of the Dzungar Khanate. Ablai did not intervene and sheltered Amursana and Dawachi from attacks led by Lama Dorji. However, after Amursana and Dawachi broke their alliance, Ablai took the opportunity to seize herds and territory from the Dzungars, in coordination with the Qing in the east, hoping to benefits from something in relations with the Qing Chinese. However, relationship between the Kazakh Khanate and the Chinese deteriorated rapidly after the Chinese Emperor, Qianlong, sought to vassalise (or incorporate) the Kazakh Khanate into the Manchu-Chinese realm, and demanded the extradition of Amursana back to Beijing, which Ablai Khan opposed out of sympathy for the Dzungar Khong Tayiji, which ultimately resulted in war; because of the Kazakh–Qing War, it had managed to unite both the Kazakhs and Dzungars under one banner for the first, and only time, against a common enemy.

== Popular culture ==
- Nomad, a 2005 Kazakh historical epic film that fictionalizes Abylai Khan's youth.
- Myn Bala, a 2011 Kazakh historical drama film set in 1729 during war between the Kazakhs and the Dzungars.

== See also ==
- Dzungar–Qing Wars
- First Sino–Kazakh War
- Battle of Shiderty
- Xinjiang under Qing rule
- Qing dynasty in Inner Asia

== Sources ==
- Edilkhanova, S. A. (2005). Kazakhsko-dzhungarskie vzaimootnosheniia v XVII–XVIII vekakh (Nekotorye istoriograficheskie aspekty problemy) [Kazakh–Dzungar Relations in the 17th–18th Centuries (Some Historiographical Aspects of the Problem)] (in Russian). Almaty: Daik-Press. ISBN 9965-699-64-X.
- Adle, Chahryar (2003). History of Civilizations of Central Asia (5th ed.). UNESCO. ISBN 978-8120820463.
- Apollova, N. G. (1960). The Economic and Political Relations of Kazakhstan with Russia. Academy of Sciences. p. 89.
- Atygaev, Nurlan (2023). КАЗАХСКОЕ ХАНСТВО: ОЧЕРКИ ВНЕШНЕПОЛИТИЧЕСКОЙ ИСТОРИИ XV-XVII BEKOВ [Essays on the Foreign Policy History of the 15th–17th Centuries] (in Russian). Almaty: Eurasian Research Institute. ISBN 978-601-7805-24-1.
- Atygaev, Nurlan (2025). "Chapter 5. Turkic States of Central Asia". In Zaitsev I. V. (ed.). Chronicle of Turkic Civilization (PDF) (in Russian). Vol. 2. Barnaul: Ministry of Science and Higher Education of the Russian Federation, Altai State University. p. 566.
- Baipakov, Karl (2014). Урбанизация Казахского ханства во второй половине XV - XVIII в. [Urbanization of the Kazakh Khanate in the second half of the 15th - 18th centuries] (PDF) (in Russian). Almaty: Kazakhstan Archaeological Society. ISBN 978-601-7312-42-8.
- Barthold, Vasily (1956). Four Studies on the History of Central Asia. Vol. 1. Brill. ISBN 978-90-04-00149-7.
- Besprozvannykh, E. L. (2003). "Китайские документы о принятии волжских калмыков в цинское подданство" [Chinese documents on the acceptance of the Volga Kalmyks into Qing subjecthood]. Вестник Калмыцкого университета (in Russian).
- Bregel, Yuri (2003). Historical Atlas of Central Asia. Leiden; Boston: Brill. p. 44. ISBN 978-90-04-12321-2.
- Burton, Audrey (1997). The Bukharans: A Dynastic, Diplomatic and Commercial History 1550–1702. London: Curzon Press. pp. 219–220, 337. ISBN 978-0-7007-0417-0.
- Chimitdorzhiev, Shirap (1979). Relations between Mongolia and Central Asia in the 17th and 18th centuries (in Russian). Science. Editorial office of Eastern Literature (publishing house). p. 32.
- Erofeeva, Irina (2014). The Epistolary Heritage of the Kazakh Ruling Elite, 1675–1821: A Collection of Historical Documents in 2 Volumes (in Russian). Almaty: ABDI Company. ISBN 978-9965-832-26-0.
- Erofeeva, Irina (2007). Khan Abulkhair: Commander, Ruler, Politician (in Russian). Almaty: Daik-Press.
- Frank, Allen J. (1 April 2000). "Varieties of Islamization in Inner Asia The case of the Baraba Tatars, 1740–1917". Cahiers du monde russe. Éditions de l’EHESS. doi:10.4000/monderusse.46. ISBN 2-7132-1361-4. ISSN 1777-5388.
- Golden, Peter B. (2011). Central Asia in World History. The New Oxford World History. Oxford University Press. ISBN 978-0-19-533819-5.
- Haines, Spencer (2017). "The 'Military Revolution' Arrives on the Central Eurasian Steppe: The Unique Case of the Zunghar (1676–1745)". Mongolica: An International Journal of Mongolian Studies. 51: 170–185. doi:10.1353/mng.2017.0008.
- "Убаши-хан: судить нельзя простить". halmgynn.ru (in Russian). 30 March 2021.
- Hummel, Arthur W. (2017). Eminent Chinese of the Qing Period. Berkshire Publishing Group. p. 601. ISBN 9781614728498.
- Isin, A. I. (2005). История Казахстана в русских источниках XVI-XX веков. Том 1: Посольские материалы Русского государства (XV-XVII вв.) [History of Kazakhstan in Russian Sources of the 16th-20th Centuries. Volume 1: Ambassadorial Materials of the Russian State (15th-17th Centuries)] (in Russian). Almaty: Daik-Press. ISBN 9965-699-79-8.
- Jambyl, Artykbaev (2019). АБЫЛАЙ ХАН (in Russian). Nur-Sultan: ИЗДАТЕЛЬСТВО ФОЛИАНТ. ISBN 978-601-338-293-7.
- Kadyrbaev, Alexander (2023). "On the History of Relations between the Volga Kalmyks and the Oirats of Dzungaria with the Nogais, Turkmens, and Kazakhs in the 17th–18th Centuries". Bulletin of Kalmyk University (in Russian). 3 (59): 6–16. doi:10.53315/1995-0713-2023-59-3-6-16.
- Kadyrbaev, Alexander (2023). "Relations of the Dzungar Khanate with the Neighboring Peoples of Central Asia in the 15th–First Half of the 18th Centuries". Nomadic Civilization: Historical Research (3): 9–24.
- Kozybayev, M. Q.; Baipaqov, K. M.; Kömekov, B. E.; Pishulina, K. A. (2010). Қазақстан тарихы (көне заманнан бүгінге дейін). Бес томдық [History of Kazakhstan (from ancient times to the present day). In five volumes.] (in Kazakh). Vol. 2. Almaty: Atamura. ISBN 978-601-282-028-7.
- Kulmukhambetova, Nuripa (2004). Қазақ тарихынан. Шежірелер, жазбалар, пікірлер, зерттеулер [From Kazakh History. Genealogies, records, opinions, research] (in Kazakh). Almaty: Zhalyn. ISBN 9965-693-11-0.
- Kushkumbaev, Aibolat (2001). The Military Affairs of the Kazakhs in the 17th–18th Centuries (in Russian). Almaty: Daik-Press.
- Kuznetsov, V. S. (1983). The Qing Empire on the Borders of Central Asia (second half of the 18th – first half of the 19th centuries) (in Russian). Novosibirsk: Nauka. pp. 18, 128.
- Lee, Joo-Yup (2019). "The Kazakh Khanate". In Ludden, David (ed.). The Oxford Research Encyclopedia of Asian History. New York: Oxford University Press. doi:10.1093/acrefore/9780190277727.013.60. ISBN 978-0-19-027772-7.
- Lee, Joo-Yup (2016). "Were the historical Oirats "Western Mongols"? An examination of their uniqueness in relation to the Mongols". Études mongoles et sibériennes, centrasiatiques et tibétaines. 47. doi:10.4000/emscat.2820.
- Massanova, N.E (22–23 April 2010). Роль номадов евразийских степей в развитии мирового военного искусства. Научные чтения памяти Н.Э. Масанова [The Role of Nomads of the Eurasian Steppes in the Development of World Military Art: Scientific Readings in Commemoration of N. E. Massanov] (in Russian). Almaty: LEM, Proceedings of the International Scientific Conference. pp. 400+. ISBN 9965-23-301-2.
- Moiseev, Vladimir (1991). Pishchulina, Klavdiya (ed.). The Dzungar Khanate and the Kazakhs (17th–18th Centuries) (PDF) (in Russian). Almaty: Gylym; Institute of Uighur Studies, Academy of Sciences of the Kazakh SSR. p. 238.
- Olcott, Martha Brill (1995). The Kazakhs (2nd ed.). Stanford, California: Hoover Institution Press. ISBN 0-8179-9351-7.
- Perdue, Peter (2005). China marches west: the Qing conquest of Central Eurasia. Harvard University Press. ISBN 0-674-01684-X.
- Pozdneev, A. M. (1880). Образцы народной литературы монгольских племён. Вып. I [Examples of Folk Literature of the Mongolian Tribes. Issue 1] (in Russian). A. M. Pozdneev. p. 148.
- Remileva, E. (2005). Ойрат-монголы: Обзор истории европейских калмыков (in Russian). Munich: E. Remileva. ISBN 978-3-939165-18-7.
- Suleimenov, Ramazan; Moiseev, Vladimir (1988). From the History of Kazakhstan in the 18th Century (on the External and Internal Policy of Ablai) (in Russian). Alma-Ata: Nauka; Institute of History, Archaeology and Ethnography named after Ch. Ch. Valikhanov, Academy of Sciences of the Kazakh SSR.
- Sultanov, Tursun I. (2006). Поднятые на белой кошме. Ханы казахских степей [Raised on a White Felt Mat: Khans of the Kazakh Steppes] (in Russian). Astana: Astana Damu-21. p. 256. ISBN 9965-9522-8-0.
- Tompiev, Maral; Uali, Murat (2015). Эпоха обретения границ [The era of gaining borders] (in Russian). Almaty. p. 210.
- Unknown (1959). Материалы по истории русско-монгольских отношений. 1636–1654. Том II [Materials on the History of Russian-Mongolian Relations. 1636–1654] (in Russian). Vol. II. Москва: Издательство Академии наук СССР.
- Unknown, Unknown (2006). Ordabasy Kurultai. Almaty: Kazakh encyclopedias. pp. 221–222.
- "From the history of Kazakhstan in the 18th century". vostlit.info (in Russian).
- Zlatkin, I. Ya (1983). "История Джунгарского ханства, 1635-1758" [History of the Dzungar Khanate, 1635-1758] (in Russian) (2nd ed.). Moscow: Nauka.
