= Raiymbek Batyr =

Kazakh warrior

Rahim-Bek Batyr
- Рахим-Бек Батыр
- Cover of the novel Raiymbek Batyr by Zh. Turlybaiuly
- Born: 1705; Kazakh Khanate
- Died: 1785 (aged 79–80)
- Military career
- Allegiance: Kazakh Khanate
- Rank: Commander
- Conflicts: Kazakh–Dzungar Wars; Battle of Añyraqai

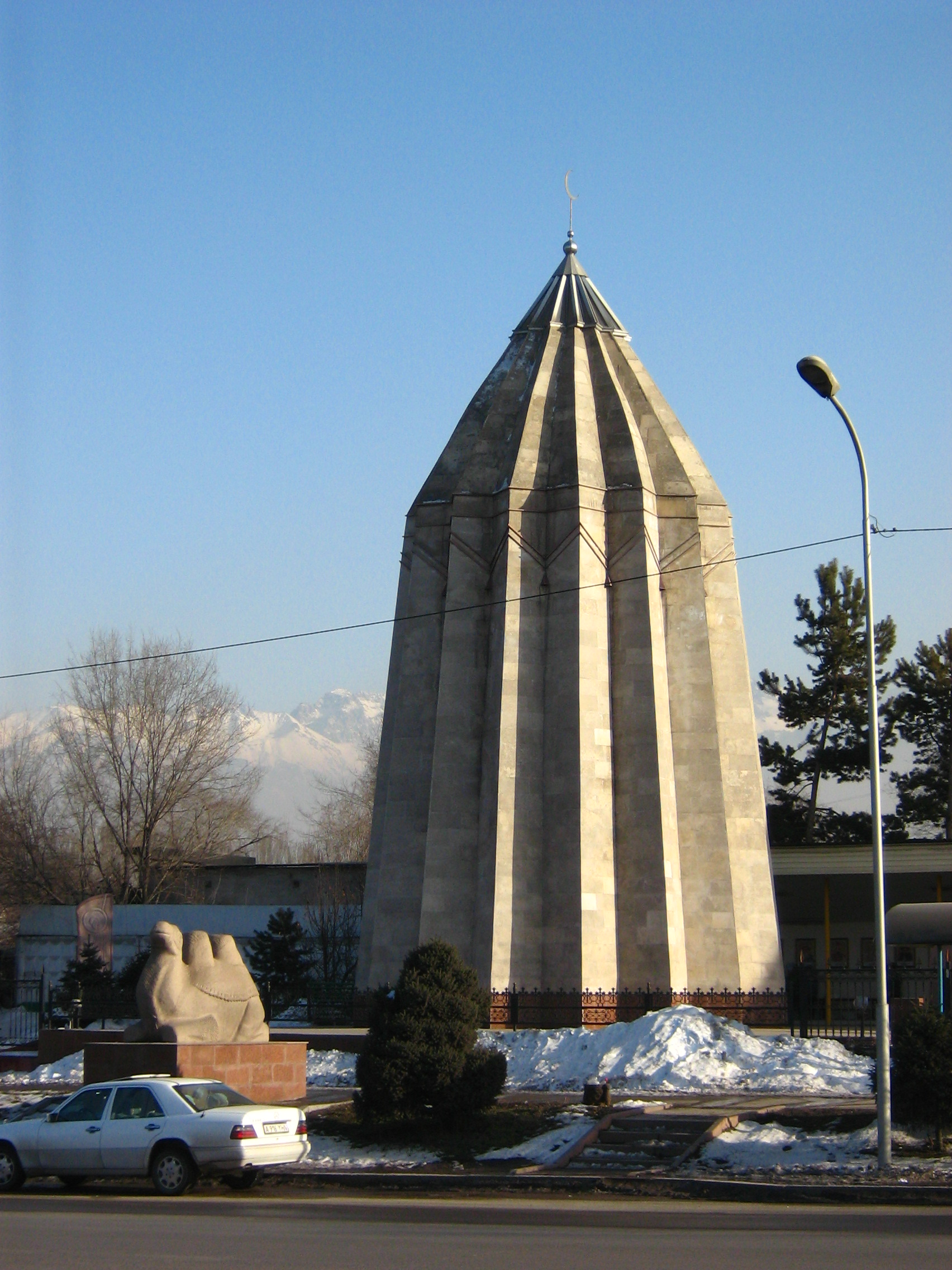
The Raiymbek Batyr Mausoleum in Almaty, Kazakhstan

Mu'izz id-Din Mūhammed Rahim-Bek Bahadur (Kazakh: Муиззиддин Мұхаммед Рахим-Бек Баһадүр, معز الدين محمد رحيم بك بهادر, romanized: Muizziddin Mūhammed Rahim-Bek Bahadür), also spelled as Raiymbek Batyr, was a Kazakh warrior from the 18th century. The term Bahadur is an honorific term meaning 'hero' in the Kazakh language.

Raiymbek Batyr fought against the Dzungar invasion of Kazakh territories. He saw the Kazakh Khanate as a hub of Muslim culture and felt that it was necessary to maintain its sovereignty at all costs, and he came to view the Kazakh–Dzungar Wars as a jihad.

Raiymbek Batyr was the grandson of a Kazakh diplomat, and prevailed on the Russian czarina Anna Ivanovna asking for protection from the Dzungars, one of the Oirat (West Mongolian) tribes that were the last remnants of the Mongol horse archer empire. He was involved in bringing the Senior Jüz into a closer relationship with Russia in exchange for protection from the Dzungars. This was a move that Kazakh rulers Abu'l Khair Khan and Abu'l-Mansur Khan worked to establish in the latter years of the Kazakh Khanate.

He is the subject of a two-volume historical novel of the same name. His name is commonly given to public features in Kazakhstan such as streets and mosques.

== Early life ==
In Almaty, Raiymbek Batyr was born in 1705. By the age of 15, he had practiced archery, sword fighting, and wrestling. He soon began participating in military campaigns against the Dzungars. He won a battle along the Ili River where captives held by the Dzungar people were freed, while many enemy soldiers were taken prisoner. Raiymbek Batyr took Sögeti, Oyrantöbe, and Jalaǵash from Dzungar Khanate control. After this victory, Raiymbek Batyr continued his campaigns, taking Zhinishke, Taushilik, Karabulak, Ush Merke, Kengsu, and Karkara.

== Aid to the Middle Jüz ==
Raiymbek Batyr's engaged in a campaign to assist the Middle Jüz upon receiving a proposal from Qabanbai Batyr to block the area between Tarbagatai and Tacheng, preventing the enemy from regrouping. He played a key role in taking Sarytau and Üygentas, then followed the Ili River back toward Qorghas. Historian Mambet Koigeldiev says that this is also documented in the research of Zeinolla Sanik in Xinjiang. In 1729, Raiymbek fought alongside other Kazakh warriors such as Nauryzbai Batyr, Ötegen, Qabanbai, and Bogenbay Batyr at the Battle of Añyraqai, defeating the army of Sary Myngzhan. Later, at the Itempes River, he led his forces to defeat the army of Shona Doba.

== See also ==
- Raiymbek Batyr monument
