= Kazakh–Dzungar War (1635–1636) =

Part of the Kazakh–Dzungar Wars

- Part of the Kazakh–Dzungar Wars
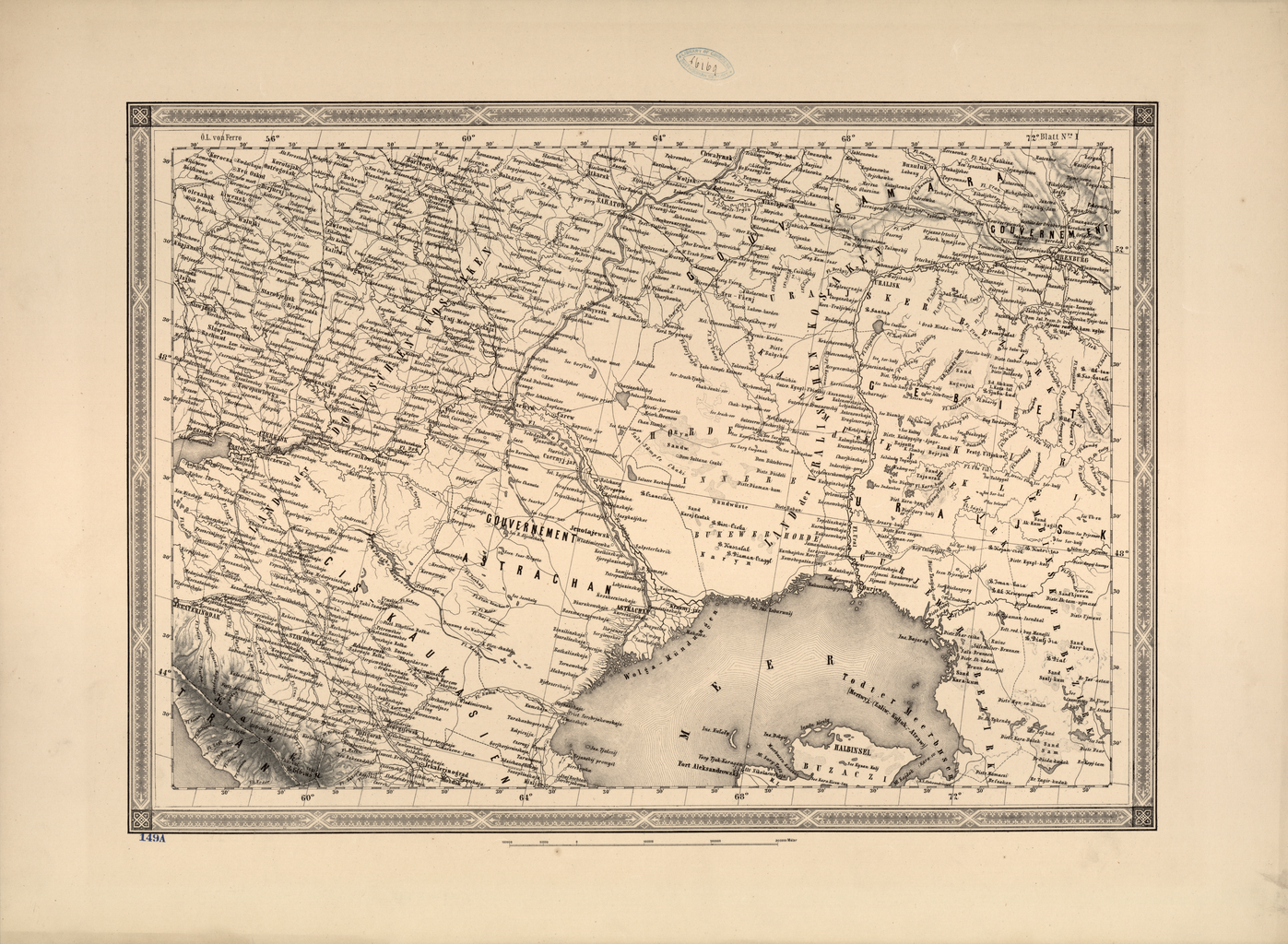
- Caspian steppe
| Date | 1635–1636 |
| Location | Kazakh Khanate, Emba river, Yaik river, Irtysh river, Central Kazakhstan |
| Result | • Tactical Dzungar victory • Strategic Jangir's victory |
| Territorial changes | Annexation of territory between Yaik and Emba rivers by Kazakhs; Expulsion of Naimans from the Bulanty and Bilieuty rivers to the northwest |

Belligerents
| Kazakh Khanate; Supported by: (Kalmyk Khanate) Chekar Kalmyks (Note: a Dörbet-Khoshut group led by Khundelen Taisha) (Yarkent Khanate) Kashgar Khanate | Dzungar Khanate |

Commanders and leaders
| (Kazakh Khanate) Esim Khan (Kazakh Khanate) Janibek Khan II (Kazakh Khanate) Jangir Sultan (POW) (Dzungar Khanate) Talai Taisha (Kalmyk Khanate) Kundelen Taisha | (Dzungar Khanate) Batur Khongtayiji (Dzungar Khanate) Talai Taisha (Dzungar Khanate) Turgen Taisha (Dzungar Khanate) Kuji Taisha (Dzungar Khanate) Tourghacha Taisha |

Casualties and losses
| (Kazakh Khanate) Heavy | (Dzungar Khanate) Heavy but heavier Kazakhs |

The Kazakh–Dzungar War of 1635–1636 was a pivotal early conflict between the Kazakh Khanate and the newly established Dzungar Khanate. Initially, the Kazakhs, led by Jangir Sultan, successfully pushed the Torghuts west of the Yaik and Emba rivers. However, a massive Oirat counter-invasion led by Batur Khuntaiji and defecting Oirat chiefs resulted in the capture of Jangir Sultan and marked the beginning of decades of intense warfare between the two states.However, the war eventually led to the release of Jangir Sultan from captivity, which strengthened his power in the political arena.

== Background ==
In 1634, Khara Khula Taisha died and was succeeded by his powerful and energetic son Khara Khotsin. (Note: In 1635, the Dalai Lama granted him the title of Erdeni Batur Khuntaiji, but in history he remained known as "Batur Khuntaiji".) The tribes of the Gorguts, Choros and Derbets who remained nomadic in the vast expanses of Southern Siberia and in the Altai region united under the auspices of the Choros feudal princes beganand in 1635 created an independent potestary entity on the banks of the Upper Irtysh called the Dzungar Khanate. Batur Khuntaiji's 20-year reign was characterized neither by wars nor by foreign policy activity. This opinion may be correct regarding the Dzungar Khanate's other neighbors, but this cannot be said regarding the Dzungar Khuntaiji's foreign policy toward the Kazakh Khanate. Fulfilling the demands of the tribal nobility, he prioritized wars of conquest in his foreign policy toward the Kazakh Khanate. During Batur Khuntaiji's reign, the Dzungar Khanate launched at least four campaigns against the Kazakh Khanate. In the fall of 1634, the Kazakh rulers Jangir Sultan, Nazar Sultan, and Mahmud-Yar Sultan arrived with an army and besieged Tashkent, but were unsuccessful and retreated.

== Course of war ==
Kazakh sources note that 1635 marked the formation of the Dzungar Khanate and the beginning of the reign of Batur Khongtayiji. Russian sources from the same year record that while Esim Khan ruled the Kazakh Khanate, his son, Jangir Sultan, exercised authority over certain groups of "Black Kalmyks."

In the spring of 1635, Jangir Sultan, in alliance with the "Chakar Kalmyks"a Dörbet-Khoshut group led by Khundelen Taisha, launched a military campaign against the Torghut leader Kho Orluk. According to S. K. Bogoyavlensky, The combined Kazakh-Dorbet-Khoshut forces achieved victory. As a result, the Torghuts—who had previously dominated the Nogais and Bashkirs—were pushed further west, losing control over the strategic lands along the Emba and Yaik rivers.

Oirats and Kazakh relations. It is known that at that time, the Kazakh possessions bordered Dzungaria, the Kazakhs constantly blocked the trade routes leading to Oirats, captured people and stole cattle. Less than six months later, the Kazakh Horde was subjected to a sudden Oirat invasion. In the organized intervention against the Kazakhs, two fronts were formed simultaneously: Batur Khongtayiji himself invaded from the east, while the oathbreakers (defectors)—the Dörbets Dalai and Turgen—along with the Choros Kuji Taisha, attacked from the west. In the July 19, according to the information given to the Tobol Prikaz by Price Abak :, 1635,Dzungarian Taishas, Talai Taisha, Batur , Kuji Taisha and Tourghacha Taisha with all the Dzungars went to the Kassack Horde this winter. The Kazakh Horde and the Black Kalmyks met, beginning a huge battle. In the second half of 1635 ,Tomsk voivode N. Egupov-Cherkassky reported to Moscow, reported the nee beginning of the Kazakh-Dzungar war and reported news about conflict.

“...the Black Kalmaks at Kontaishi had a battle with the Cassack Horde this summer, and first the Cassack Horde defeated the Black Kalmaks. And the Black Kalmaks, having gathered, and that Cassack Horde, killed many people and captured their prince Yangir, a alive. At that time, Ishim(Esim) is the Tsar of Cassack, and Yangir was the Tsar of the Black Kolmaks.”

In the first stage of the war, the Kazakhs defeated the Dzungars. However, in the second stage, the Dzungars quickly gathered and defeated the Kazakhs, killing many of their people. In one of those battles Jangir Sultan was captured . The Dzungars expelled the Naimans from the Bulanty and Buliety Rivers of the Ulytau Mounains to the northwest. Talai Taisha and his comrades made further campaigns in those years, which means that the war continued into the following years. In late 1635, Dalai Taisha led a Dzungar offensive against Kazakh groups nomadic beyond the Irtysh River . Eyewitness Gavril Ilyin reported that the campaign specifically targeted the "Kazakh Horde of Janybek Khan. Historian V. A. Moiseev characterizes this offensive as a success for the Dzungar forces. In 1636, Dalai Taisha engaged in further conflict with the Kazakhs; however, specific details of the military confrontation remain unknown.

Although the Kazakh troops were defeated at times, they won on other offensives, and in one of the successful attacks, Jangir Sultan was released from captivity.

== Aftermath ==
Jangir Sultan's captivity strengthened his lifelong hatred of the Dzungars. He did not stop his constant attacks and persecution to Dzungar nomadic camps. During the struggle, the Dzungars managed to form an alliance with the Mughols of Kashgar. Jangir successfully built relationships with the batyrs and biys, paying particular attention to his relations with the khans of Bukhara and Khiva. Zhangir's authority quickly rose and strengthened. He spent most of his time in the city of Turkestan—the center of public life—in order to maintain control of the situation. There is evidence that some of the Oirats recognized the authority of Sultan Jangir, and in 1640, Zhangir Khan sent an ambassador to Dzungaria, but there is no information about the results of the embassy. In 1637, Erdeni Batur returned to Dzungaria and set out a campaign with Torobaikhu (Güshi Khan), battling the Khalkhas in the Battle of the Bloody Hills—marrying the Torobaikhi's daughter—Amin Dara.

== Sources ==
- Abuseitova, Meruert Khuatovna (1998). Казахстан и Центральная Азия в XV–XVII вв.: история, политика, дипломатия [Kazakhstan and Central Asia in 15th–17th cc.: history, policy, diplomacy] (in Russian). Almaty: Daik-Press; R. B. Suleimenov Institute of Oriental Studies. ISBN 9965-441-01-4.
- Agadzhanov, S. G.; Kumekov, B. E.; Margulan, A. Kh.; Pishchulina, K. A. (1983). Қазақ ССР тарихы (көне заманнан бүгінге дейін). Бес томдық [History of the Kazakh SSR (from ancient times to the present day). In five volumes] (in Kazakh). Vol. 2. Almaty: Gylym; Ch. Ch. Valikhanov Institute of History, Archaeology and Ethnography.
- Kozybayev, M. Q.; Baipaqov, K. M.; Kömekov, B. E.; Pishulina, K. A. (2010). Қазақстан тарихы (көне заманнан бүгінге дейін). Бес томдық [History of Kazakhstan (from ancient times to the present day). In five volumes.] (in Kazakh). Vol. 2. Almaty: Atamura. ISBN 978-601-282-028-7.
- Sultanov, Tursun I. (2006). Поднятые на белой кошме. Ханы казахских степей [Raised on a White Felt Mat: Khans of the Kazakh Steppes] (in Russian). Astana: Astana Damu-21. p. 256. ISBN 9965-9522-8-0.
- Baipakov, Karl (2014). Урбанизация Казахского ханства во второй половине XV - XVIII в. [Urbanization of the Kazakh Khanate in the second half of the 15th - 18th centuries] (PDF) (in Russian). Almaty: Kazakhstan Archaeological Society. ISBN 978-601-7312-42-8.
- Isin, A. I. (2005). История Казахстана в русских источниках XVI-XX веков. Том 1: Посольские материалы Русского государства (XV-XVII вв.) [History of Kazakhstan in Russian Sources of the 16th-20th Centuries. Volume 1: Ambassadorial Materials of the Russian State (15th-17th Centuries)] (in Russian). Almaty: Daik-Press. ISBN 9965-699-79-8.
- Masanov, N. E.; Abylkhozhin, Zh. (2000). История Казахстана: народы и культуры [History of Kazakhstan: Peoples and Cultures] (PDF) (in Russian). Almaty: Dayk-Press. p. 608. ISBN 9965-441-31-6.
- Zlatkin, I. Ya (1983). История Джунгарского ханства, 1635-1758 [History of the Dzungar Khanate, 1635-1758] (in Russian) (2nd ed.). Moscow: Nauka.
- Atygaev, Nurlan (2023). КАЗАХСКОЕ ХАНСТВО: ОЧЕРКИ ВНЕШНЕПОЛИТИЧЕСКОЙ ИСТОРИИ XV-XVII BEKOВ [Essays on the Foreign Policy History of the 15th-17th Centuries] (PDF) (in Russian). Almaty: Eurasian Research Institute, Nurlan Atygaev. ISBN 978-601-7805-24-1.
- Remileva, E. (2005). Ойрат-монголы: Обзор истории европейских калмыков (in Russian). Munich: E. Remileva. ISBN 978-3-939165-18-7.
- Adle, Chahryar (2003). History of Civilizations of Central Asia (5th ed.). UNESCO, Adle Chahrayar. p. 934. ISBN 978-8120820463.
- Massanova, N.E (22–23 April 2010). Роль номадов евразийских степей в развитии мирового военного искусства. Научные чтения памяти Н.Э. Масанова [The Role of Nomads of the Eurasian Steppes in the Development of World Military Art: Scientific Readings in Commemoration of N. E. Massanov] (in Russian). Almaty: LEM, Proceedings of the International Scientific Conference. pp. 400+. ISBN 9965-23-301-2.
- Unknown (1959). Материалы по истории русско-монгольских отношений. 1636–1654. Том II [Materials on the History of Russian-Mongolian Relations. 1636–1654] (in Russian). Vol. II. Москва: Издательство Академии наук СССР.
- Moiseev, Vladimir (1991). Pishchulina, Klavdiya (ed.). The Dzungar Khanate and the Kazakhs (17th–18th Centuries) (PDF) (in Russian). Almaty: Gylym; Institute of Uighur Studies, Academy of Sciences of the Kazakh SSR. p. 238.
- Chimitdorzhiev, Shirap (1979). Relations between Mongolia and Central Asia in the 17th and 18th centuries (in Russian). Science. Editorial office of Eastern Literature (publishing house). p. 32.
