= Bogenbay Batyr =

Kazakh warrior from the 18th century

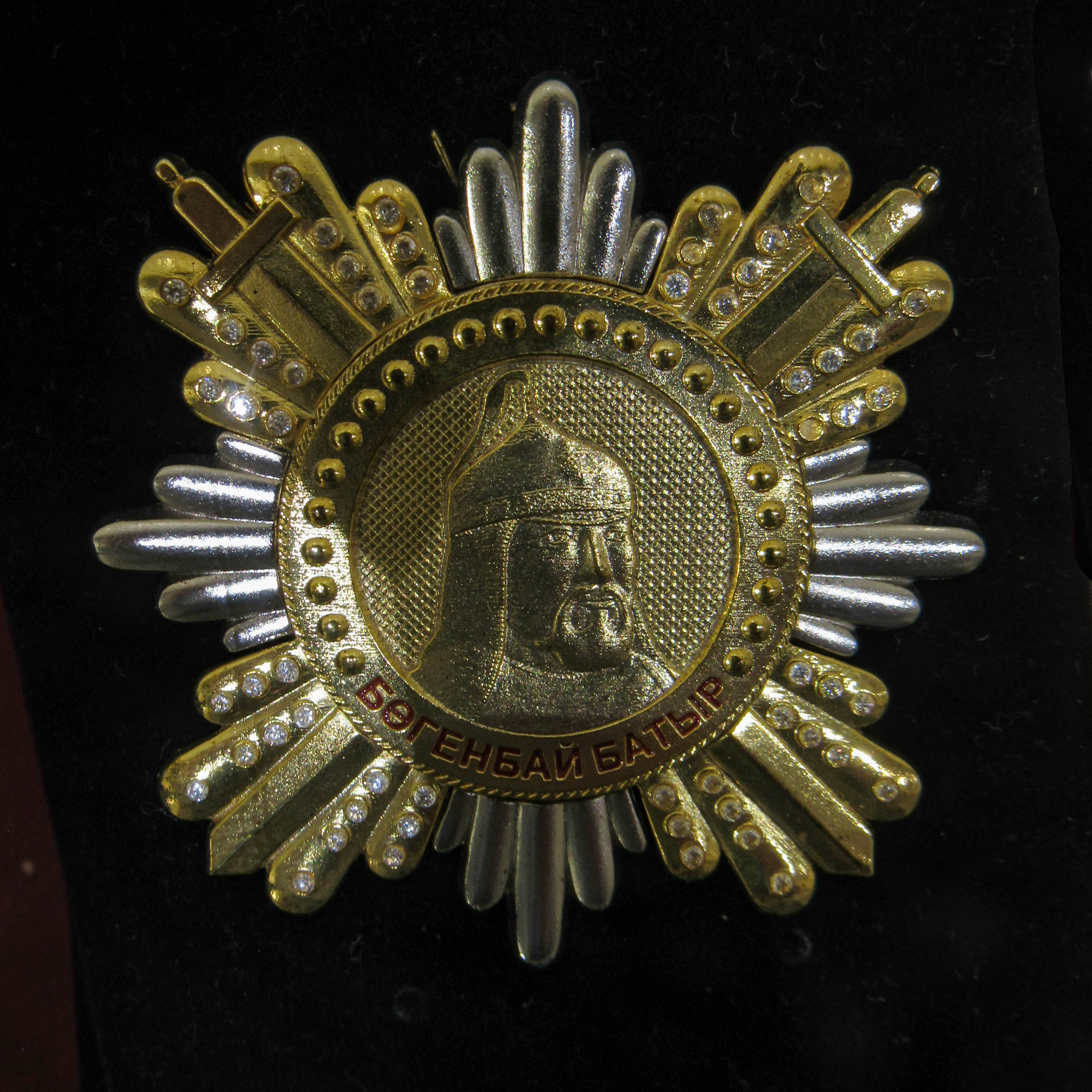
- Medal of the Order of Bogenbay Batyr (National Museum of the Republic of Kazakhstan)
- Born: c. 1680; Near Syr Darya river, Kazakh Khanate
- Died: 1778; Turgai Valley, Kazakh Khanate
- Occupation: Baghatur

Bogenbay Batyr (Kazakh: Бөгенбай батыр, romanized: Bögenbay batır) was a famous Kazakh warrior from the 18th century. Batyr is an honorific term meaning "brave warrior" in the Kazakh language. He was born near Syr Darya river. His father Aksha was a notable man among Kanzhigali clan. Tauke Khan, who was one of the Kazakh khans of the Kazakh Khanate, entrusted the army of 80,000 men to Aksha. He was also keen in elocution. Bogenbay Batyr inherited these abilities of his father. Starting from his childhood he studied elocution and was well known among the Kazakh Steppe. He resisted the Dzungar invasion of Kazakh territories along with Ablai Khan and played a major role in liberating the Kazakhs from Dzungar rule.

== Role in the Dzungar War ==
Having witnessed much in his lifetime, Bogenbai Batyr was well acquainted with the Kazakh tribes and their warriors, as well as the legal matters and complex relations between the Kazakhs and the Dzungars. During the reign of Tauke Khan, in 1710, a gathering of Kazakh leaders took place in Karakum Desert, attended by prominent judges Töle Biy, Kazybek, and Aiteke. Bogenbai Batyr was also elected as a representative of the people's militia. His widespread reputation as a military commander and his bravery in a battle against a Dzungar noble on the banks of the Sary-Kengir River in 1710 earned him this trust.

The main topic discussed at the assembly was the relationship with the Dzungar Khanate. Some argued that not only the clans but entire Kazakh hordes should unite to fight and expel the Dzungars, while others proposed aligning with the Dzungar Khanate. At a decisive moment in the heated debate, the bold and fearless Bogenbai Batyr stepped forward. He threw his sword at his feet, tore his shirt open, and bared his chest, exclaiming:

"We shall avenge our losses; we cannot stand idly by while our pastures are plundered and our children taken captive. If we must die, we shall die with weapons in our hands! When have the warriors of the Kipchak steppe ever bowed their heads? When my hands were first stained with my enemy’s blood, my beard had not yet turned gray! How can we endure the tyranny of these invaders? We still have swift horses, and our quivers still hold sharp arrows!"

Bogenbai Batyr's speech was decisive in settling the Dzungar issue. After his words, no one dared to oppose him openly. As a result, he was elected as the commander of the Kazakh army.

Bogenbai Batyr's name is closely linked to the decisive Battle of Añyraqai in the spring of 1730 near Lake Balkhash. The Kazakh forces, led by legendary warriors such as Bogenbai, Kabanbai, Nauryzbai Batyr, Zhanibek, and Malaisary, inflicted a crushing defeat on the Dzungar army for the second time. Thousands of Dzungar soldiers were killed on the battlefield. Many lay wounded and dying, and their cries echoed across the steppe for days, giving the battlefield its name—Anyrakai ("the wailing place"). After suffering a devastating defeat, the Dzungar forces, led by Shuno-Dabo, were forced to retreat eastward along the Ili River.

To consolidate this victory and continue the liberation of Kazakh lands, another major assembly of the three Kazakh hordes was held at Ordabasy, near Shymkent. There, Abul Khair Khan and Bogenbai Batyr were elected as the supreme military commanders. Under their leadership, the Kazakh forces continued to strike against the Dzungars. In one of these battles, Bogenbai Batyr personally defeated the enemy commander Shuno-Dabo in single combat, shattering the morale of the Dzungar troops.

Between 1725 and 1727, Bogenbai Batyr, alongside Ablai Khan, led the Kazakh army in a series of battles. As a result, the Dzungar forces suffered heavy losses and were ultimately pushed beyond the Zhetysu region, past the Dzungarian Alatau, liberating key cities like Turkistan (city) and Sawran (Kazakhstan) from enemy occupation.
