= Battle of Bulanty =

Legendary 1727 battle in Kazakhstan

Battle of Bulanty–Bileuty
- Part of the Kazakh–Dzungar War (1723–1730) of Kazakh–Dzungar Wars
- Ulytau national park
Date	Spring of 1727
Location	Ulytau Mountains, Kazakhstan
Result	Kazakh victory
Territorial changes	Kazakhs liberate the Ulytau Mountains

Belligerents
Kazakh Khanate	Dzungar Khanate

Commanders and leaders
(Kazakh Khanate) Abulkhair Khan	Unknown

Strength
Unknown	Unknown

The Battle of Bulanty is a legendary military battle fought between the Kazakh Khanate led by Abulkhair Khan and the Dzungar Khanate in 1727.

The folk legend of the battle was first recorded in 1905 by the researcher and collector of Kazakh folklore A. A. Divaev, 175 years after the event; it remained unrecorded in authentic documentary sources.

== The question of the authenticity of the event ==
In modern studies devoted to Kazakh-Dzungar relations in the first half of the 18th century, as well as related issues, folklore sources are increasingly occupying a central place. They often become, if not the basis, then the only tool for recreating the battles and socio-political processes of that time. At the same time, the authors of such works, with few exceptions, neglect basic requirements of scholarly ethics: they do not provide the names of informants or the time when certain folklore texts were first recorded. This approach is strikingly different from generally accepted scholarly methods of working with historical sources and demonstrates an unacceptable simplification in the acquisition of facts. This tendency is particularly evident in a number of recent articles and in sections of major comprehensive works dealing with key episodes of the Kazakh-Dzungar War of 1723–1730—such as the Battle of Bulanty (1727) or the Battle of Anyrakai (1730). In these descriptions, a mythologized perception clearly prevailed, replacing scientific analysis and seriously distorting the already difficult to reconstruct historical reality.
