= Raiymbek Batyr monument =

Monument in Almaty, Kazakhstan

Coordinates: 43°16′13″N 76°57′07″E

- Location: Almaty, Kazakhstan
- Builder: Yedige Rakhmadiev
- Height: 12 meters
- Opening date: 2012
- Dedicated to: Raiymbek Batyr

Raiymbek Batyr monument (Russian: памятник Райымбек Батыру, romanized: pamyatnik raiymbek batyru) is located on the intersection of Raiymbek Avenue and Pushkin Street in Almaty, Kazakhstan.

== History ==
Raiymbek Batyr (1705–1785) was a great Kazakh batyr, the son of Tuke and grandson of the famous Khangeldy Batyr of the Alban family of the Elder Zhuz. Raiymbek Batyr lived during one of the most turbulent periods of the Middle Ages in Kazakhstan, during the raids and seizures of the Dzungar (Kalmyk) horde on Kazakh lands. Raiymbek Batyr had already defeated the Balkhash tiger in his youth, for which he was recognized as one of the youngest batyrs. He was a legendary warrior and fighter for the freedom of the Kazakh people who liberated Semirechye from the Dzungar invaders. For his exploits and bravery, he was appointed one of the generals of Ablai Khan. The united forces of the three zhuzes, led by Ablai Khan, defeated the Dzhungars and freed the land of Semirechye. This battle took place in 1729 between the rivers Chu and Ili. The armies of Raiymbek Batyr, Bogenbay Batyr and Kabanbai Batyr played the most important role in this victory. Raimbek Batyr became a prominent commander under the leadership of Ablai Khan and finally expelled the Dzungars from the southeastern borders of Kazakhstan.

== Monument description ==
The monument was unveiled in 2012 by the head of the city Akhmetzhan Yesimov in Almaty instead of the demolished monument to the heroes of the October Revolution. The monument was built in a heroic form - the horse and the batyr, sitting on it, are depicted at the moment of the highest heat of battle. On the pedestal there are engraved years of Batyr's life and lines from a poem by Mukagali Makatayev: «Ұрпағына медет бер, Ұлы бабам!»

The opening of the monument has been repeatedly postponed since 2005 due to disagreements between the descendants of Raiymbek Batyr.

== Monument authors ==
- Sculptor: Yedige Rakhmadiev
- Designer: Igor Polyakov
- Architect: Vladimir Nemchikov
