= Winter battle =

- Part of Kazakh–Dzungar Wars
Date	c. 1732
Location	Middle Zhuz, Northwestern Kazakhstan
Result	Kazakh victory

Belligerents
Kazakh Khanate	Dzungar Khanate

Commanders and leaders
Unknown	Unknown

The Winter Battle was a major battle between Dzungar (Oirat) forces and the Kazakhs of the Middle Zhuz, which took place in the northwestern Kazakh nomadizing grounds during the winter of 1732. The Dzungars launched a surprise winter attack, counting on a tactical advantage: during this time of year, Kazakh livestock weakened, migration became difficult, and mobilization capabilities dropped, leaving the nomads vulnerable to plundering. However, the campaign ended in failure for the Oirats — according to a dispatch, the troops returned "with great losses, so that almost all remained there". The attack disrupted the traditional gathering of the Middle Zhuz nobility, which was scheduled to take place during the same period.
