= Nauryzbai Batyr =

Nasrullah Nauryzbai Kutpanbetuly Bahadur (Kazakh: Насрұллаh Наурызбай Құтпанбетұлы Баһадүр, نصرالله نوروزباي قطبانبتولي بهادور, romanized: Nasrūllah Nauryzbai Qūtpanbetūly Bahadür), also known as Nauryzbai Bahadur or Nauryzbai Batyr (1706-1781) was a Kazakh war hero known for fighting against the Dzungars in the Dzhungar-Kazakh wars. Nauryzbai was one of three standard-bearers of Abu'l-Mansur Khan, the Kazakh ruler and commander-in-chief.

== Biography ==
Nasrullah Bahadur was born in the Jalpaktas-Seriktas district of modern-day Almaty, Kazakhstan in 1706. His exact birth date is unclear, but it was likely around the Kazakh holiday of Nowruz (approx. mid-March), thus earning him the middle name Nauryzbai. Nasrullah claimed partial Timurid descent on his mother's side and descent from the Golden Horde ruler Mubarak Khwaja on his father's side.

Nasrullah grew up training in combat with the sons of Kazakh mırzas and khans. In his youth, he developed a close friendship with a prince named Zairullah (later Nur Ali Khan), the son and successor of Abu'l-Khair Muhammed Khan. This friendship would prove to be long-lasting and relatively influential in Kazakh history, as Nur Ali and Nasrullah together led the Kazakh army in an uprising against the encroaching Russian settlers in the mid-1750s.

Kazakh ruler Abu'l-Khair Muhammed Khan died in 1748, allowing Nur Ali Khan to succeed him. Towards the end of Abu'l-Khair's rule, Nasrullah was promoted to commander of the Muslim Kazakh ghazis. He also earned the title Bahadur (braveheart) due to his combatting prowess and rise in the military ranks. In 1752, he began leading Nur Ali's army in an uprising against the Russian Empire. While the uprising was unsuccessful, Nasrullah and Nur Ali survived and went on to lead the Kazakhs for approximately thirty more years.

Following the failed rebellion against Russian settlers, Nasrullah Bahadur spent the rest of his life aiding Kazakh ruler Abu'l-Mansur Khan as a commander in the Kazakh-Dzungar Wars and in battles against the expanding Qing Chinese. After displaying abundant bravery in battle, Abu'l-Mansur made Nasrullah one of the three standard-bearers in the Kazakh army. Nasrullah died in battle against Chinese troops in 1781. His son, Aziz id-Din Bahadur, went on to help Kazakh co-rulers Ğubaidullah Khan, Sher Ghazi Khan, and Kenesary Khan in one last unsuccessful rebellion against the Russians.

== Commemoration ==
On 16 September 2006, a monument to Nauryzbai Batyr was unveiled in Kaskelen to mark the 300th anniversary of the batyr’s birth. The unveiling ceremony was attended by the President of Kazakhstan, Nursultan Nazarbayev.
