= Nuraly Khan =

Nūr Ali Khan
- Khan; Khanzada; Sultan

2nd Khan of the Junior jüz
- Reign: 1748–1786
- Predecessor: Abu'l-Khair Khan
- Successor: Jar-Muhammad Khan
- Born: 1704; Kazakh Khanate
- Died: 1790 (aged 85–86); Ufa, Russian Empire
- Spouse: Nurbanu Begum
Names
- زیر الله نور علی غازی بهادور بن ابو الخیر خان; Zairūllah Nūr-Ali Ghāzi-Bahadur bin Abū'l-Khair Khan
- House: House of Borjigin
- Dynasty: Tore; House of Urus Khan
- Father: Abu'l Khair Khan
- Mother: Farida Begum
- Religion: Sunni Islam

Zairūllah Nūr-Ali Ghāzi-Bahadur bin Abū'l-Khair Khan (Kazakh: زیر الله نور علی غازی بهادور بن ابو الخیر خان, Зайрұллаh Нұр-Әли Ғази-Баһадүр бин Әбілқайыр хан, romanized: Zairūllah Nūr-Äli Ğazi-Bahadür bin Äbılqaiyr han), also known as Nūr Ali Khan (1704–1790) was the khan of the Junior juz, eldest son of Abu'l Khair Khan.

== Rise to power and reign ==
Nur Ali Khan was born in 1704 as the oldest son of Abu'l-Khair Muhammed Khan and his consort Farida Begum. He was given the name Zairullah at birth and went by it until after ascending to the throne. Through his father, Zairullah was the grandson of the Kazakh mırza Abdullah Sultan, who was best known for rising to the royal ranks after completing his hajj from his home in modern-day Astana to Mecca.

Zairullah Nur Ali Khan ascended to the throne in 1748 following the death of his father. His reign was largely characterized by a fragmentation of the Kazakh Khanate into the three jüzes once again. Zairullah (referred to as Nur Ali Khan hereafter) occupied the Junior jüz that his father originally ruled before uniting the Kazakh people under his rule.

As ruler of the Junior jüz, Nur Ali Khan was granted full authority over most of western and central Kazakhstan, but was unable to assert his authority anywhere else. Facing threats in the west from the Buddhist Kalmyks and the Qing Chinese to the east, Nur Ali Khan spent much of his time gathering resources and forming strong troops to prevent his state from crumbling to expanding foreign neighbors.

Nur Ali Khan was initially hesitant to accept Russian rule as he thought it would erase the cultural identity of the Turko-Persian, Sunni Muslim Kazakhs. Though his father made an alliance with the Russian Empire to protect the Kazakh Khanate from foreign enemies, Nur Ali Khan broke the alliance and waged war against the Russian Empire in 1752. The famous Kazakh war hero Nasrullah Nauryzbai Bahadur was the commander of the army at this time, and led the Muslim Kazakh ghazis on most of the battles along with Nur Ali himself. After numerous military defeats, however, Nur Ali made peace with the Russians once again and agreed to join the Russian Empire as an autonomous state.

Nur Ali Khan was deposed in 1786 after being deemed too old and unwell to rule. His younger brother, Jar Muhammad Khan, took over the throne of the Junior jüz in his place for a few years and exiled him to the Russian trading town of Ufa. In 1790, Nur Ali Khan died in Ufa at the age of 86.
