= Battle of Shiderti =

Battle between the Qing dynasty and the Kazakh Khanate

Battle of Shiderti River
- Part of the First Sino–Kazakh War of Sino–Kazakh Wars
Date	1756
Location	Shiderti River, Kazakhstan, Middle Jüz
Result	Kazakh victory

Belligerents
Kazakh Khanate	Qing Dynasty

Commanders and leaders
(Kazakh Khanate) Kozhabergen Batyr (Kazakh Khanate) Qabanbai Batyr (WIA)	(Qing dynasty) Dardan (surrendered) (Qing dynasty) Khadakh (surrendered) (Qing dynasty) Zhaohui (surrendered) (Qing dynasty) Zeren (surrendered)

Strength
(Kazakh Khanate) 10,000	(Qing dynasty) 20,000

Casualties and losses
(Kazakh Khanate) 4,000 killed	(Qing dynasty) 17,000 killed

The Battle of Shiderti, part of the larger First Sino–Kazakh War, took place in 1756 in the headwaters of the Shiderty River, near Bayan-аul. The Kazakhs, led by batyrs Kabanbay, Kozhabergen, and Bogenbay, defeated the forces led by Generals Dardan and Khadakh. The site of this battle has retained the name "Shurshit kyrilghan" ("place of the defeat of pursuts, i.e., the Manchurian-Chinese").

The decisive Kazakh-Chinese battle erupted in the headwaters of the Shiderty River to the west of Bayan-Aul. Only 3,000 out of 20,000 Chinese soldiers remained alive. Significant losses, food shortages, and the onset of harsh winter forced the Chinese authorities to recall the remnants of their troops. The victory of the Kazakhs was costly but nonetheless significant.
