= Ulu (disambiguation) =

An ulu is an Inuit cutting knife.

Ulu may also refer to:

== People ==
- Sue Ulu (born 1963), American voice actor
- Ulu Grosbard (born 1929), theater and film director and film producer

== Places ==
- Ulu (island), Bismarck Archipelago, Papua New Guinea
- Ulu, North Khorasan, a village in Iran
- Ulu, Russia, a rural locality (a selo) in the Sakha Republic
- Ulu, South Sudan, close to the Adar oilfield
- Ulu Masen, a tropical rainforest in Aceh, Indonesia
- Ulu Peninsula, Antarctica

== Other uses ==
- University of London Union
- Breadfruit (‘ulu in Hawaiian)
- Uma’ Lasan language (ISO 639-3: ulu), a language of Borneo
- A business founded by Paul Hembery
- Ulu Scripts, family of writing systems used in central and south Sumatra

== See also ==
- Ulus (disambiguation)
- Ullu, Indian streaming service
