= Raiymbek Batyr Mausoleum =

Building Almaty, Kazakhstan

Coordinates: 43°15′34″N 76°54′24″E

Raiymbek Batyr mausoleum
- Kazakh: Райымбек батыр кесенесі
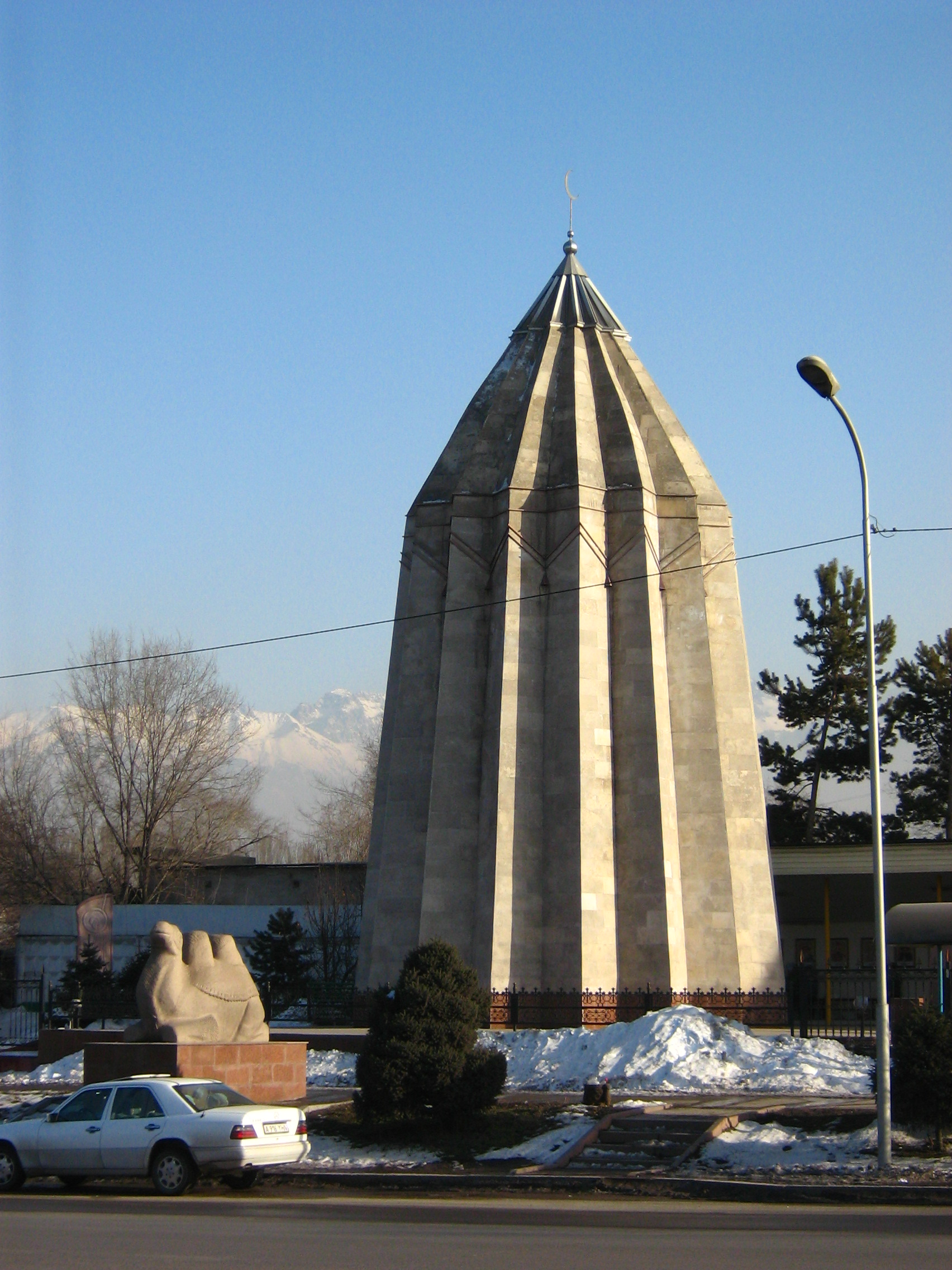
- Location: Almaty, Kazakhstan
- Designer: Ibrayev Bek Anuarbekovich
- Material: granite
- Beginning date: 1992
- Completion date: 1994
- Dedicated to: Kazakh batyr

Raiymbek Batyr Mausoleum (Kazakh: Райымбек батыр кесенесі, romanized: Raiymbek batyr kesenesı, Russian: Мавзолей Райымбек Батыра, tr. mavzolei raiymbek batyra) — is the mausoleum of the Kazakh hero Raiymbek, who fought against Dzungar invaders. It is located in the city of Almaty, on the homonymous Raiymbek Prospect.

== Construction ==
Raiymbek's tomb was destroyed during the Russian Civil War, between 1918 and 1922. In 1981, a granite stela was installed at the burial site. In 1992, the mausoleum was built on the gravesite, designed by architects B. Ybraev, Sh. Otepbaev and S. Agytayev. In 2017, by a resolution of the Almaty City akim, Raiymbek's mausoleum was transferred to the communal property of the city of Almaty.

== Modern-day mausoleum ==
The monument has an unusual shape, in the form of a pointed tent with a crescent on top, inside which there is a sarcophagus with the ashes of the hero. Also on the territory of mausoleum there is a spring and a prayer room.

In 2005, in honor of 300th anniversary of Raiymbek's birth, the deputy of Almaty mäslihat and general director of the corporation "Sana-Oi Invest" Daulet Abenov funded the creation and installation near the mausoleum of a symbolic Koran, made of black marble, where people can worship by laying their hands on it.

The sacredness of mausoleum is underscored by the fact that in his lifetime, Raiymbek was recognized as an "auliye", or "saint".
