= Mambet Koigeldiev =

Kazakh historian

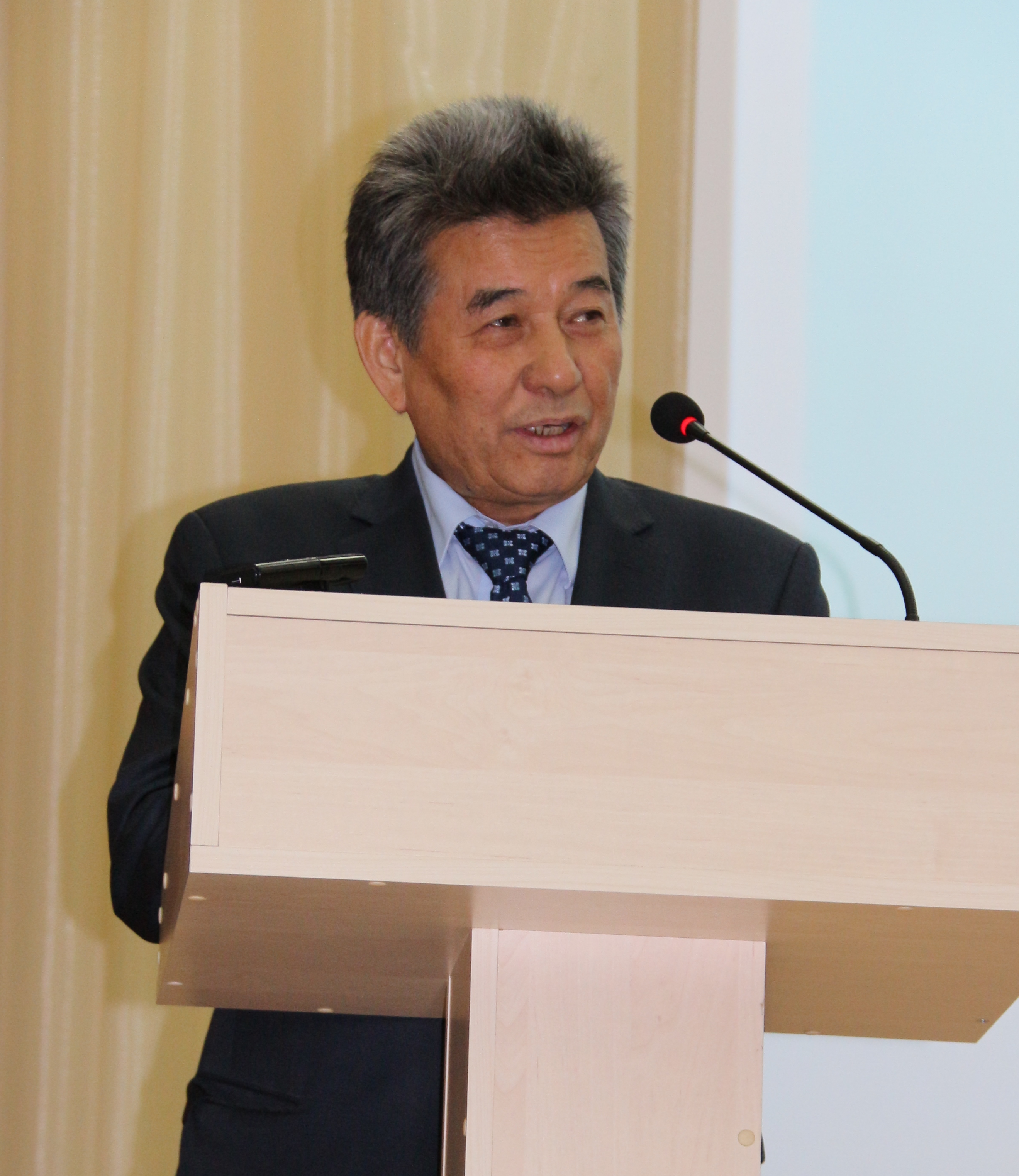
- Born: Mambet Kulzhabayuly Koigeldiev; 18 August 1947 (age 79); Chu District, Jambyl Region, Kazakhstan
- Education: Kyrgyz National University
- Spouse: Saule
- Children: 3 sons
- Scientific career
- Fields: history, Soviet times
- Workplaces: Abai Kazakh National Pedagogical University; Association of Historians of Kazakhstan
- Website: qoigeldi.kz

Mambet Kulzhabayuly Koigeldiev (Kazakh: Мәмбет Құлжабайұлы Қойгелдиев, Mämbet Qūljabaıūly Qoigeldiev; born 18 August 1947) is a Kazakh historian, Doctor of Historical Sciences, professor, Full Member of the Kazakhstan National Academy of Science. He also serves as a President of Association of Historians of Kazakhstan He specializes in Alash Orda, Alash movement.

== Biography ==
=== Career ===
- School teacher and researcher at Zhambyl Region's Archive (1969-1971);
- Lecturer at Kazakh State University (1971-1989);
- Senior Researcher at Institute of Party under Central Committee of Communist Party of Kazakhstan;
- Head of the Modern History of Kazakhstan Department at Kazakh National University, Director of Continuing Education Department at Kazakh National University, Dean of History Department at Kazakh National University (1991-2001);
- Director of Institute of History and Ethnology under the Ministry of Education and Science of Kazakhstan (2002-2006);
- Head of the History Department at Kazakh National Pedagogical University (2006–present time)

== Selected publications ==
- Mambet Koigeldiev (29 March 2007). "The Alash Movement and the Soviet Government: A Difference of Positions" (PDF).
