= Ulus =

Ulus may refer to:

== Places ==
- Ulus, Bartın, a district in Bartin Province, Turkey
- Ulus, Beşiktaş, neighborhood in Beşiktaş, Istanbul Province, Turkey
- Ulus, Ankara, an important quarter in central Ankara, Turkey
  - Ulus (Ankara Metro), an underground station of the Ankara Metro

== Other uses ==
- Ulus (newspaper), a defunct Turkish newspaper
- Orda (organization) or Ulus, a tribe, clan, village or group under a given leader
- Ulus, an administrative division type of the Sakha Republic, Russia
- Ulus, an inhabited locality type in the Republic of Buryatia, Russia

== People with the given name ==
- Ulus Baker (1960–2007), Turkish Cypriot sociologist

== See also ==
- Ulu (disambiguation)
- Ulug Ulus
