= Taisha =

Taisha may refer to:

- Japanese topics:
  - Cultural features:
    - Taisha (shrine) A kind of Shinto shrine
    - Taisha-zukuri, type of Shinto architecture
    - Taisha joseki, joseki maneuver in game of Go
  - Japanese geography:
    - Taisha, Shimane, town in the Hikawa District of Shimane
    - Taisha Line, railway route in Izumo area
- Political culture of Ecuador:
  - Taisha, Ecuador (see List of cities in Ecuador)
  - Taisha Canton, administrative area
- Taisha (band), musical ensemble from New Zealand
- Ta’isha, Arab nomadic tribe of Sudan
