= Tauke Khan =

Tauke Muhammad Khan Тәуке Мұхаммед хан
- Khan; Khanzada; Shah-i-Turan

Khan of the Kazakh Khanate
- Reign: 1680-1715/1718
- Coronation: 1680
- Predecessor: Bahadur Khan
- Successor: Kaip Khan
- Born: 1625; Kazakh Khanate
- Died: 1715/1718; Turkistan, Kazakh Khanate
- Burial: Mausoleum of Khoja Ahmed Yasawi, Turkistan, Kazakh Khanate
- Spouse: Salima Zuhra Begum
- Issue: Bolat Khan; Sameke Khan
Names
- توکل محمد بهادر قاضی خان; Täuekel-Mūhammed Bahadür Qazy xan
- House: House of Borjigin
- Dynasty: Tore; House of Urus Khan
- Father: Jahangir Khan
- Mother: Gulnaz Banu Khanum
- Religion: Sunni Islam

Tawakkul Muhammad Bahadur Qazi Khan (Kazakh: توکل محمد بهادر قاضی خان, Тәуекел-Мұхаммед Баһадүр Қазы хан, romanized: Täuekel-Mūhammed Bahadür Qazy xan) (1635 – 1715, r. 1680 – 1715) ruled as a Kazakh khan of the Kazakh Khanate. In 1652 after the death of his father Jahangir Khan, the ruler of Jungars Erdeni Batyr had dramatically increased his military pressure on the Kazakh Khanate in an attempt to conquer it. Eventually, he died in 1670. Galdan Boshugtu Khan replaced him (1670–1699, in some sources 1670–1697), and was later succeeded by Tsewang Rabtan (1699–1729). Throughout these invasions, a weak Kazakh ruler named Bahadur Khan had taken the throne. He was quickly deposed by the Kazakhs, allowing Tauke Muhammad to take the Kazakh throne.

The hardest time for the Kazakhs started from 1698, when the Kazakhs divided their khanate into Juzes, as a result maintaining unity became a complicated task. Tauke Muhammad, who remained the khan of all three Juzes, managed to keep the unity of Kazakhs, earning him the honorific title "Shah-i-Turan" (Persian for "King of Turan") like his father before him.

In 1692, Tauke Muhammad connected with Peter I of Russia. Eventually, the Russian Empire lowered the trade taxes (also known as bazh tax). In 1710, by uniting 3 juzes in the place Kuntobe (near the city of Tashkent), Tauke Muhammad fought the Jungars in the place named Augyr and gained a victory over them.

With Tauke Khan's death in 1715, the three "jüzes" of the Kazakh Khanate — the Great jüz, the Middle jüz and the Little jüz — were no longer able to pursue a unified political policy. Abu'l Khair Khan of the Little jüz was nominally the senior khan of the entire Kazakh Khanate, but in practice each jüz was ruled independently by its own khan.

Tauke Khan is also known for refining the Kazakh code of laws, and reissuing it under the title "Жеті Жарғі" (transliterated: "Jetı Jarğı" — "Seven Charters").

| Preceded by Batyr Khan | Khan of the Kazakhs; 1680–1718 | Succeeded by Ablai Khan |

== See also ==
- List of kazakh khans
- Kazakh Khanate
- History of Kazakhstan
