= Salqam Jangir Khan =

Salqam-Jahangir Khan سلقام جهانگیر خان Салқам-Жаһангир хан
- Khan; Khanzada; Shah-i-Turan

Khan of the Kazakh Khanate
- Reign: 1643-1652
- Predecessor: Janibek bin Esim Khan
- Successor: Tauke Khan
- Born: c. 1610; Kazakh Khanate
- Died: 1652; Turkistan, Kazakh Khanate
- Burial: Turkistan, Kazakh Khanate
- Spouse: Banu Khanum
- Issue: Appak Sultan; Tauke Khan
Names
- محمد سلقام جهانگیر خان بن عصیم سلطان; Mūhammad Salqām-Jahangīr Khan bin Esim Sultan
- House: House of Borjigin
- Dynasty: Tore; House of Urus Khan
- Father: Esim Khan
- Religion: Sunni Islam

Mūhammad Salqām-Jahangīr Khan bin Esim Sultan (Kazakh: محمد سلقام جهانگیر خان بن عصیم سلطان, Мұхаммед Салқам-Жаһангир хан бин Есім сұлтан, romanized: Mūhammed Salqam-Jahangir Han bin Esım Sūltan), commonly known as Salqam-Jahangir Khan or Salqam-Jangir Khan, Jangir Khan ruled as the Khan of the Kazakh Khanate from 1643 to 1652. He was the son of Esim Khan.

== Mention ==
Some sources referred to him as Jahangir Khan/Jangir Khan , an alternate spelling of his name in the Kazakh and Persian languages. After a stunning victory in the battle for Orbulak its small growth and a strong constitution received from the people nicknamed "Salqam Jahangir" which translates as "impressive, powerful Jahangir" and often referred to as a "Salqam-Jangir Khan".

== Biography ==
Salqam Jangir Khan was a prominent statesman and an outstanding leader who succeeded Esim Khan's throne. During the life of courage Jangir people nicknamed "Salqam Jäñgir" (impressive) as the historians to Jangir were characterized by his qualities such as determination, perseverance, endurance and willingness to sacrifice. These qualities have put him on par with the name of his father and rescued Kazakh tribes of the civil wars and external threats of physical destruction. The exact date of the proclamation Jangir Khan has not been established. There is no reliable data about the year of his birth. According to some reports, he was raised on a white rug immediately after his father's death in 1628, but its long recognized as the supreme khan of Kazakhs. Like his father Esim Khan Jangir was also concerned about the threat of the Dzungars, a Buddhist tribe who occupied the territory near present-day Xinjiang Province in western China and who were at constant warfare with the Muslim Uyghurs. Fears intensified after coming to power Batur-kontayshy (1635-1654), who created a strong centralized state in Dzungaria. At this point, the Kazakh Khanate occurred internecine strife and were unable to support their fellow Turkic Muslims, the Uyghurs. Each representative Chingizid claimed supremacy. Attempts of Kazakh sultans to strengthen the state's political influence met with fierce resistance from the beys, who also worked hard to establish the Kazakhs as a key Islamic power in Central Asia. The constant political struggle prevented the growth Jangir Khan's power, who always had to prove his inherited right to rule. In one of the battles with Dzhungars in 1635 Jangir was captured in battle. After the conclusion of a peace treaty, he was released home with an obligation to no longer bother the Dzungar Khanate. An active role in the implementation of foreign policy played by his son Tauke, he established friendly relations with the ruler of Samarkand Zhalantos Bahadur (1576-1656). Their union was a response to the creation of the Erdeni Batur coalition of Dzungars to attack Zhetysu.

Salqam-Jahangir Khan led numerous successful campaigns against the Dzungars, allowing the Kazakh people to rebuild a strong state. He was bestowed with the honorific title "Shah-i-Turan" (Persian for "King of Turan") for strengthening the Kazakh Khanate.

== Battle of Orbulaq ==
When Erdeni Batur in 1643 seized some land in the southern and south-eastern spurs of the Tian Shan, Jangir with the host 600 people decided to meet the enemy's army, despite its significant superiority (Zhungars was about 50,000). For Battle Mountain Jangir chose a place close to the River Hor (Orbulaq) Jungar Alatau because of what called Orbulak battle. A tactic of warfare has been selected trench method. Researchers who carefully studied the place of the famous battle, note that a number of complex Jangir applied tactics of the arsenal of military art of the Kazakhs, but at the same time used the unextended fragmentation methods among the nomads of the enemy. As described by A.I. Levshin, Jangir, fearing an open military confrontation with Dzhungars, arranged part of his squad in a gorge between two mountains, he dug in advance by a deep moat and high obnesya shaft. The length of the military fort was 2.5-3 km, the front edge of the trench was as tall as a human growth.
