= Battle of Añyraqai =

Part of the Fifth Kazakh-Dzungar War

- Part of the Kazakh–Dzungar War (1723–1730) of Kazakh–Dzungar Wars
Date	April 1730
Location	Añyraqai Gorge between Balkhash and Alakol Lakes
Result	Kazakh victory
Territorial changes	Kazakhs liberate Northwestern Jetisu

Belligerents
Kazakh Khanate	Dzungar Khanate

Commanders and leaders
(Kazakh Khanate) Abul Khair Khan	Unknown

The Battle of Añyraqai, also known as the Battle of Anrakai, was a legendary military battle between the Kazakh Khanate and the Dzungar Khanate in April 1730. The Kazakhs defeated the Dzungars and expelled them from the northwestern part of Jetisu. This led to the Kazakhs resettling on the Ili River.

The folk legend of the battle was first recorded in 1905 by the researcher and collector of Kazakh folklore A. A. Divaev, 175 years after the event; it remained unrecorded in authentic documentary sources.

== The question of the authenticity of the event ==
The Battle of Anyrakai has recently become a theme for modern Kazakh mythmaking. This is due not only to its perceived patriotic resonance in the formation of a new ideology of sovereign nation-state building, but also largely to the absence of any authentic documentary sources dedicated to this historical event in Kazakhstan's historiography. Folk memory of it has been preserved exclusively in historical legends and tales, as well as in folk toponymy. Moreover, the very first Kazakh legend about the legendary battle of their ancestors with the Dzungars reached the educated public of Russia only 175 years later (1905), in a written account by the prominent pre-revolutionary researcher and collector of Kazakh folklore, A. A. Divaev.

At the beginning of the Soviet period, the history of the Kazakh-Dzungar war of 1723-1730, briefly reviewed by A. A. Divaev based on Kazakh folklore materials, received a more detailed and thorough treatment in two special articles (1927, 1929) by a professional railway engineer and researcher of the history of the Kazakh people M. Tynyshpaev. They stand out among all previous and subsequent Soviet works on the Dzungar problem mainly because they were the only serious attempt in science to provide a more or less accurate spatial-geographical and chronological localization of the events of the victorious offensive of Kazakh detachments against the Dzungars in the territory of Southern and Southeastern Kazakhstan.

The articles by A. A. Divaev and M. Tynyshpaev essentially close the circle of more or less reliable sources of knowledge about the history of the Battle of Anyrakai in the latest publications by Kazakhstani journalists and professional historians. What follows, as a rule, is free-wheeling, amateurish fantasies on this topic, where the main objects of historical myth-making are the location of the historical battle, the total number of people involved in it on both sides, the course of the battle itself, and the names of its direct participants. Essentially, these are hypostatized retransmissions of various later records (Soviet and modern) of folklore about this event, which bear a strong imprint of various ideological cliches and stereotypes inspired by various contemporaneous reports in Kazakhstani media and school textbooks on the history of pre-revolutionary Kazakhstan.

In the poetic heritage of the Kazakh zhyrau (folklore recordings of literary works) Bukhara zhyrau, Umbetai zhyrau, Tatikara zhyrau, as well as in the works published in the pre-revolutionary past by the mining engineer A. Vlangali (1851-1852) and Kazakh researchers Ch. Valikhanov, M.-Zh. Kopeev, Sh. Kudaiberdiev and others, the Battle of Anyrakai is not mentioned at all by any of the listed folk poets and pre-revolutionary historians.
