= Sino–Kazakh War =

1756–1757 conflict between China and Kazakh Khanate

- Part of the Ten Great Campaigns and Sino-Kazakh Wars
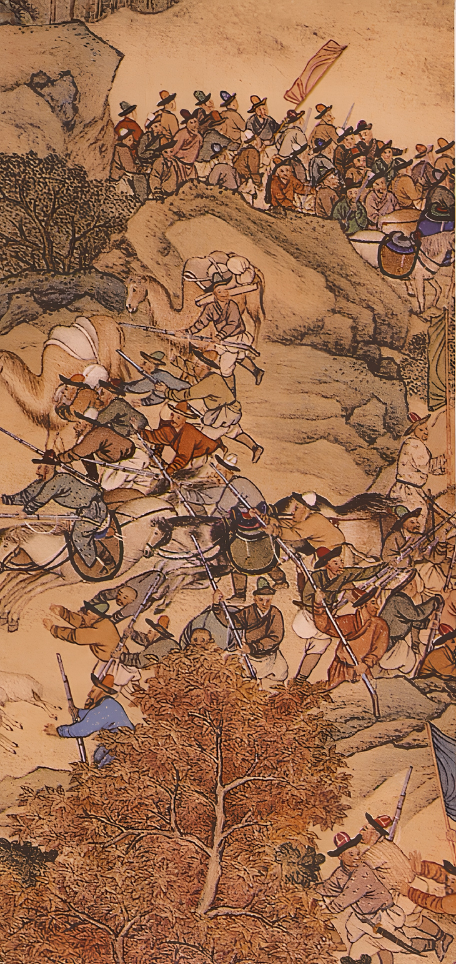
- A Battle of the Qing Emperor Qianlong's Army with the Kazakhs, Giuseppe Castiglione
Date	1756
Location	Eastern and southeastern Kazakh Steppe, including modern-day Kazakhstan, Kyrgyzstan, Xinjiang (China), Western Mongolia, and Dzungaria borderlands
Result	See Aftermath

Belligerents
Kazakh Khanate • Middle Jüz (Dzungar Khanate) Dzungar rebels	Qing dynasty

Commanders and leaders
Ablai Khan; Amursana; Qabanbai Batyr; Kojaibergen Batyr; Abulpeiz	Qianlong Emperor; Dardan; Khadakh; Fude; Zhaohui

The Sino–Kazakh War was a 1756-1757 Qing military campaign, commanded by Khadak (northern column) and Dardane (western column), aimed at capturing Amursana, an Oirat Dzungar rebel who fled into Kazakh lands after being defeated by the Qing dynasty.

== Background ==
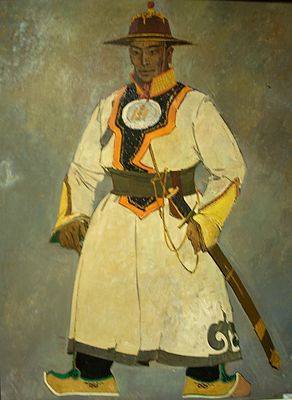
Dzungar leader Amursana. His familial tie (as son-in-law) to Ablai Khan would prove to be the cause that triggered the war between Qing China and Kazakh Khanate.

At the beginning of spring 1755, a large army of the Qing Empire, numbering around 200,000 troops, invaded the territory of the Dzungar Khanate and conquered it in the summer of the same year. After the fall of the khanate, the Oirat noble Amursana led a rebellion against Qing rule. However, not all Oirat leaders recognized authority, which led to internal conflicts. Abandoned by his allies with only 200 warriors, Amursana went into hiding in the steppes under the Kazakh ruler Ablai Sultan. The Qing court was concerned with Kazakh support for the rebellion of Turkic and Mongol peoples in Central Asia and established diplomatic relations with the Middle Zhuz.

Before preparations had begun for the war against the Dzungar Khanate, China had closely monitored the claimants to the throne through agents and Oirat defectors, and was well informed about the role the Kazakh rulers, primarily Sultan Ablai, had played in attacking the Dzungars throughout the spring of 1755.

After Dawachi’s defeat and the elimination of the Dzungar Khanate, the emperor proposed two solutions to the “Kazakh question”:
1) Diplomatically attempt to force Kazakh detachments to leave Dzungaria.
2) Compel them to recognize the suzerainty of the Bogd Khan. In case of resistance, use Qing troops against the Kazakh forces.

In the summer, Qing envoys arrived at Ablai’s court with a manifesto demanding the withdrawal of Kazakh troops. In response, Ablai sent an embassy to the Qing court to establish diplomatic relations, which in Beijing was interpreted as an expression of the Kazakhs’ willingness to recognize dependence on the Qing dynasty. However, subsequent events dispelled this notion. When Amursana’s location became known to the Qing, an embassy was sent to the camps of Ablai demanding the surrender of the deposed Dzungar khuntaiji. The Kazakh sultan refused to comply with this demand and marched to meet the Qing forces with a militia from the Middle Zhuz, supported by units of the Junior Zhuz under the command of Yeraly Sultan.

== Course of war ==
=== 1756 ===
The Qing government ordered the northern and southern armies to advance in two columns into the Kazakh steppes. The Northern Army was commanded by the Manchu General Khadaha, and the Western Army by General Dardana. In response, Ablai assembled a militia of warriors from the Middle and Senior Zhuz, along with supporters of Amursana, and moved to confront the Qing forces. Later, Kazakhs from the Junior Zhuz under Sultan Yeraly came to reinforce them. Bloody battles ensued between the Kazakh forces and the numerically superior Qing troops.

Chinese sources claim the campaign was successful while Russian accounts say the summer campaign of 1756 was met with mixed results. According to the Siberian governor V. A. Myatlev, a Kazakh force of about 10,000 inflicted several heavy defeats on Qing troops at Kalmyk Tologa and along the Ayaguz River. Nevertheless, due to the vastly superior Qing forces, along with the reluctance of many sultans and elders of the three zhuzes to fight the invaders, Ablai, Yeraly, and other military leaders were forced to retreat.

Due to the deteriorating military-political situation, some Kazakh nobles petitioned the Russian administration to allow their families and property to pass behind the Russian fortification line. The Russian government preferred to maintain neutrality and did not intervene in Qing operations in Dzungaria and the Kazakh steppes.

In August 1756, a battle took place between the militia of Ablai Sultan and the troops of the Qing Bogdykhan, which ended in the defeat of the Kazakhs, who began to retreat to the Russian fortified lines. The Kazakh sultans appealed to the Russian authorities for protection from the pursuing Qing troops. The Qing commanders optimistically reported to Beijing about their desire to see the matter through to the end while Ablai was in fear and the “Kazakhs were indecisive.”

The Qing invasion, casualties, and resulting hardship affected the attitude toward Amursana. In the autumn of 1756, he fled from the Middle Zhuz and found refuge in the steppes of the Altai Uriankhai. Persistent resistance from Ablai’s forces disrupted the plans of the Qing troops, commanded by Zeren. An imperial decree noted that Zeren, while leading the army, made mistakes and acted without a proper plan; he was later stripped of his rank and punished. Command of the western army was transferred to Dardane, and of the northern army to Khadak, but these commanders also failed to achieve success.

=== 1757 ===
However, these localized tactical successes did not fundamentally alter the broader strategic equilibrium. In the spring of 1757, the Qing court launched a decisive counteroffensive, with the Qianlong Emperor appointing the veteran Eight Banners generals, Zhaohui and Fude, to command a newly mobilized expeditionary force deployed deep into the Kazakh steppe. By this juncture, the pacification of the Dzungar Khanate was virtually complete, enabling the Qing military apparatus to concentrate its full strategic resources on the western front.

Confronted by the immense mobilization capacity and asymmetric logistical advantages of the Qing Empire at its zenith, Ablai Khan demonstrated pragmatic geopolitical foresight. He recognized that while the Kazakh militia excelled at asymmetric flank maneuvers and mobile skirmishes, they could not sustain a protracted, full-scale invasion against an empire with near-limitless strategic depth. Furthermore, he sought to avert the risk of similar demographic devastation that had recently befallen the Dzungars. Compounding these concerns were the parallel encroachments of the Russian Empire from the west; hence, the Kazakh leadership concluded that simultaneously antagonizing two expanding empires was strategically untenable.

Consequently, Ablai Khan executed a significant shift in his foreign policy. He denied Amursana's appeals for renewed sanctuary and prohibited the Oirat insurgent from operating within Kazakh territories. Stripped of indigenous support, the fugitive rebel was forced to flee into imperial Russian territory, where he succumbed to smallpox several months later.

== Results ==
In June 1757, under the dual pressure of advancing Qing vanguard detachments and diplomatic overtures, Ablai Khan dispatched his brother, Batyr, along with an official delegation to the Qing military encampment to negotiate a cessation of hostilities. Ablai formally submitted a memorial to the Qianlong Emperor, declaring the submission of the Kazakh Khanate—specifically the Middle and Great Jüz—as a tributary vassal of the Qing dynasty.

The Qianlong Emperor accepted the submission, formally investing Ablai as the recognized ruler of the Kazakhs and inaugurating decades of institutionalized tributary relations. Through this pragmatic policy of strategic accommodation, the Kazakh Khanate successfully averted total conquest, preserved its internal administrative autonomy, and secured recognized pasturage rights from the Qing court in the fertile regions east and south of Lake Balkhash, successfully maintaining a precarious buffer state between the Qing and Russian empires.

According to Soviet historians Suleimenov R.B. and Moiseev V.A., the Manchus not only failed to compel the Kazakhs to withdraw from the anti-Qing movement of the peoples of Central Asia and surrender Amursana, but also suffered a series of defeats, barely managing to retreat their forces to the rear. Amursana remained at large, and the Kazakh rulers did not demonstrate the expected loyalty to the Qing emperor, instead engaging in armed resistance against his forces. Kazakh historian K. K. Abuev says that the series of Qing invasions of Kazakhstan in 1756–1757 effectively ended in failure. Soviet historians R. B. Suleimenov and V. A. Moiseev emphasize the role of Ablai, who proved to be an energetic and capable commander, displaying courage and valor. Under his leadership, the small Kazakh militia delivered sudden strikes from the rear and flanks and then disappeared instantly, preventing the Qing command from delivering a decisive blow or forcing the enemy to surrender. Dissatisfied with these failures, the Qing government recalled its top commanders. Zeren, Khadak, and Dardane were removed from their positions.

However, according to Russian orientalist A.M. Pastukhov, this account is not very credible. He believes that Kazakh envoys in Ust-Kamenogorsk attempted to create the illusion of victory among the Russian authorities by accompanying the retreating Qing troops and avoiding serious confrontation with them. On October 31, 1756, Bashkir elder Abdulla Kaskinov reported in Orenburg that after the Qing troops began withdrawing, Abylay was in serious condition and unable to walk. Amursana, however, was under the supervision of Abylay's men and never left his side. This conclusion is confirmed by the report of I. I. Neplyuev from October 8, 1756, which stated that “The Middle Kirghiz-Kaisak Horde, declaring the oppression currently being perpetrated by the Chinese army… towards the Uisk line, has approached and is asking for protection.” Orientalist Pastukhov A.M. summarizes:

“Thus, at a time when the most influential and energetic feudal lord of the Middle Zhuz was seriously wounded, the Kazakh nomads were left without protection, and, most likely, were only able to observe the withdrawal of enemy troops.”

== See also ==
- Dzungar genocide
- Dzungar-Qing wars
- Sino-Burmese War
- Battle of Ngọc Hồi-Đống Đa, also known as the Sino-Vietnamese War
- Sino-Nepalese War
- Revolt of the Altishahr Khojas and Afaqi Khoja revolts
