= Abul Khair Khan =

Kazakh khan (1693–1748)

Abu'l Khair Khan
- Khan; Khanzada; Sultan; Mirza; Shah-i-Turan
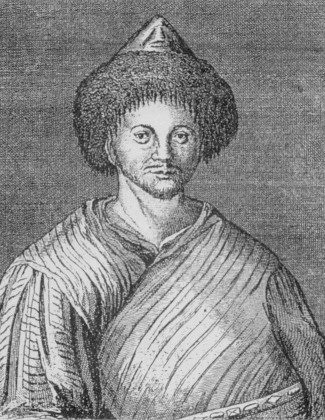

1st Khan of the Junior jüz
- Reign: 1718-1748
- Successor: Nur Ali Khan
- Born: 1693; Turkistan, Kazakh Khanate
- Died: 12 August 1748 (aged 54–55)
- Spouse: Farida Begum
- Issue: Nur Ali Khan; Jar-Muhammad Khan; Erali Khan; Aishuaq Khan
Names
- میرزا ابو الخیر خان بن حاجی عبد الله سلطان; Mırza Abū'l-Khair Mūhammed Khan bin Qājı Abdūllah Sultan
- House: House of Borjigin
- Dynasty: Tore; House of Urus Khan
- Father: Qajı Abdullah Sultan
- Religion: Sunni Islam

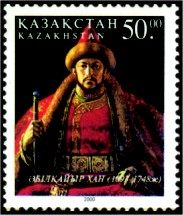
Stamp of Kazakhstan devoted to Abul Khair Khan, 2001 (Michel 316)

Mirza Abū'l-Khair Muhammed Khan bin Qājı Abdūllah Sultan (Kazakh: میرزا ابو الخیر محمد خان بن حاجی عبد الله سلطان, Мырза Әбілқайыр Мұхаммед хан бин Қажы Абдұллаh Сұлтан, Myrza Äbılqaiyr Mūhammed Han bin Qajy Abdūllah Sūltan, [mərˈzɑ æˌbɘʟ̠qɑˈjər mʊχɑmˈmʲet χɑn bɯjn qɑˈʒə ɑbdʊɫ̚ˈɫɑ(h) sʊɫˈtɑn]), more commonly known by his short name Abū'l-Khair Khan (1693–1748) was leader of the Kazakh Little jüz in present-day western and central Kazakhstan. During this period, the Little jüz participated in the Kazakh-Dzungar Wars mainly to avenge the "Great Disaster" Dzungar invasion of major Kazakh territories. Under Abu'l-Khair's strong leadership, the Kazakh ghazis defeated Dzungar forces at the Bulanty river in 1726 and in the Battle of Anrakai in 1729.

Abu'l Khair Khan was born as the second oldest son of Hajji (Qajı) Abdullah Sultan, a Kazakh mırza (aristocrat) who had quickly risen to the royal ranks after completing his hajj to Mecca. Like his father, Abu'l-Khair also began as a mırza before rising to the throne. This made him one of the few documented khans of the Kazakh Khanate to have not been descended from either Janibek Khan or Kerei Khan. Nonetheless, it was likely due to Abdullah's connections with the royal family that Abu'l Khair Khan himself became ruler.

Abu'l-Khair Khan took the throne in 1718 as the new khan of the Kazakhs. In order to obtain Russian help against the Dzungars, Abul Khair Khan took an oath of allegiance to the Russian crown in 1731. However, Abu'l-Khair Khan continued raiding Bashkir and Kalmyk settlements for following 9 year, from 1731 to 1740. In an attempt to unite his empire and prevent anyone from defecting and helping out the Dzungars, Abu'l-Khair Khan also fostered a strong religious identity among the Sunni Muslim Kazakhs. Despite taking Russian citizenship and fostering an allyship with the tsar, though, Abu'l-Khair still tried to limit the amount of Russian influence exercised over the Kazakh Little jüz since he still wanted his empire to function as an independent Islamic state. According to a 2019 study, "neither Kazakhs nor Russian officials thought of their relationship as a form of annexation, but rather merely an alliance."

For his contributions in reuniting the Kazakh people and defeating the Dzungars, Abu'l-Khair was bestowed with the title "Shah-i-Turan" (Persian for "King of Turan"). However, some Kazakh still viewed his submission to the Russians as traitorous. He was beheaded in 1748 by his rival, Baraq Sultan for this act, which Baraq considered to be treason against the Kazakh people.

== Sources ==
- "History of the Republic of Kazakhstan", Embassy of the Republic of Kazakhstan in Belgium (English)
- Famous Kazakhs Website on the Kazakh Diaspora in Germany
- https://dergipark.org.tr/en/download/article-file/2018630 DİNÇ, Mehmet Ali. "RUSYA’NIN TÜRKİSTAN’DA YAYILMA SİYASETİNİN İLK ADIMI KAZAK KÜÇÜK CÜZ HANLIĞINI İŞGALİ." Akademik MATBUAT 5.2: 193-212. (Turkish)
