= Jüz =

One of the three territorial/tribal divisions in modern Kazakhstan

Approximate areas occupied by the three Kazakh hordes in the early 20th century; red represents the Senior zhuz, orange represents the Middle zhuz and green represents the Junior zhuz.

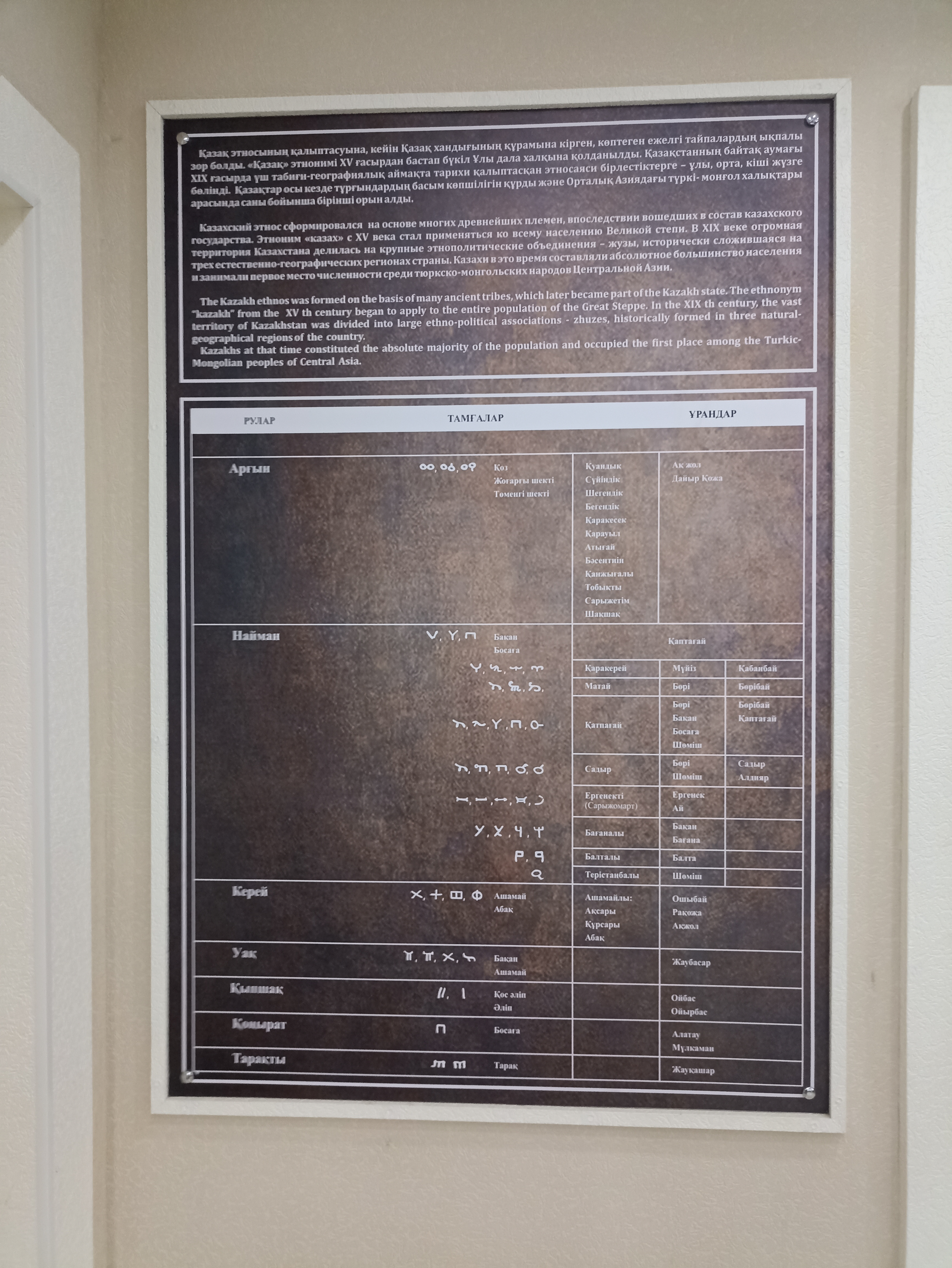
Kazakh tribes as explained in an English–Kazakh–Russian-language table at the Akmola Regional Museum of History and Local Lore, Kokshetau, Kazakhstan

A jüz (Modern Kazakh tribes) (/ˈ(d)ʒ(j)uːz/; Kazakh: ءجۇز / жүз, pronounced [ʒʉz], also translated as 'horde') is one of the three main territorial and tribal divisions in the Kypchak Plain area that covers much of the contemporary Kazakhstan. It represents the main tribal division within the ethnic group of the Kazakhs.

- The Senior jüz (Kazakh: ۇلى ءجۇز, Ұлы жүз, romanized: Ūly jüz) covers territories of southern and southeastern Kazakhstan, northwestern China (Xinjiang) and parts of Uzbekistan.
- The Middle jüz (Kazakh: ورتا ءجۇز, Орта жүз, romanized: Orta jüz) consists of six tribes, covering northern, central and eastern Kazakhstan, and northwestern China.
- The Junior jüz (Kazakh: كىشى ءجۇز, Кіші жүз, romanized: Kışı jüz)) consists of three tribes, covering western Kazakhstan and eastern European Russia (Orenburg Oblast).

== Origin ==
The origin of the Kazakh zhuzes (tribal confederations) is dated by Kazakh historiography to the early 18th century, while pre-revolutionary Russian historiography attributes their emergence to the 17th century.

According to various Soviet, pre-revolutionary, and Kazakhstani researchers, the concept of “zhuzhood” (zhuzovost’) emerged as a result of internal elite conflicts among the Chinggisid clan of Töre following the death of Tauke Khan. The first khans of the three zhuzes were established in 1721.

Chokan Valikhanov believed that when the Golden Horde began to disintegrate, the Kazakhs formed large tribal alliances (zhuzes) in order to retain control over their nomadic territories.

N. A. Aristov linked the formation of the zhuzes to Dzungar raids, suggesting that external threats prompted the unification.

V. V. Bartold associated the rise of zhuzes with geographic factors, arguing that the natural environment of distant regions allowed Kazakhs to preserve distinct cultural and economic traditions.

M. P. Vyatkin agreed with Bartold’s position but added political developments to the explanation, asserting that by the 16th century, the separated hordes had become political unions.

Linguist Sarsen Amanzholov proposed that the Kazakhs had already divided into zhuzes between the 10th and 12th centuries, prior to Genghis Khan’s unification of the Turkic and Mongolic peoples into a single Turko-Mongol Empire.

Orientalist T. I. Sultanov emphasized the lack of reliable evidence regarding the origin of the zhuzes. He suggested that in the second half of the 16th century, the traditional ulus system transformed into the zhuz system.

The etymology of the word “zhuz” remains unclear. Some scholars associate it with the Arabic word juzʼ (جزء) meaning “a part” or “segment.” The earliest references to zhuzes in Eastern historical documents appear around the mid-17th century. In the works of Mahmud ibn Wali, written between 1634–1641, it is stated that after the death of Khan Shaybani, his son Bahadur “took charge of the land and uluses… he chose the White Horde as his wintering grounds and zhailau, which is also known as Yuz Horde.” Some scholars interpret “Yuz” in this context as being equivalent to the Kazakh “zhuz.” Thus, even Arab chronicles suggest that “Yuz Horde” = “Zhuz Horde,” i.e., the Middle Zhuz, implying a central or commanding position.

Another theory proposed by Bagdat Naikam suggests that the word zhuz means circle or ring. According to his theory, the number of Kazakh tribes corresponds to three concentric defense rings. In ancient times, Turkic military formations were divided into 12, 9, and 6 units. Each “ring” included 12, 6, and 3 main tribes, respectively:

- Senior juz: Alban, Dulat, Jalair, Kanly, Shaksham, Oshakty, Sary-Uisun, Orgeuli, Suan, Shapyrashty, Shanyshkyly, Ysty.
- Middle juz: Argyn, Kerei, Konyrat, Kipchak, Naiman, Uak.
- Junior juz: Alimuly, Baiuly, Zheryru.

According to this theory, the three-tiered military-defense formation was developed during a period of intense external pressure, when Kazakh tribes primarily defended themselves against the Dzungars, Kalmyks, and Kokands. Thus, Naikam challenges the hierarchical interpretation of zhuz origin and instead presents a strategic-military rationale rooted in Kazakh defense tactics.

== History ==
The earliest mention of the Kazakh jüz or hordes dates to the 17th century. Velyaminov Zernov (1919) believed that the division arose as a result of the capture of the important cities of Tashkent, Yasi, and Sayram in 1598.

Some researchers argued that the jüz in origin corresponded to tribal, military alliances of steppe nomads that emerged around the mid 16th century after the disintegration of the Kazakh Khanate. They played a role in regulating livestock, access to watering holes, pastures, and the sites of nomadic camps.

Yuri Zuev argued their territorial division comprises three ecological or topographic zones, the Senior jüz of the southern and southeastern steppe being set apart from the two other zones by Lake Balkhash.

According to some researchers, the Kazakhs were separated in the First Civil War. Tribes that recognized Buidash Khan formed the Senior jüz. Tribes that recognized Togym Khan formed the Middle jüz. Tribes that recognized Ahmed Khan formed the Junior jüz.

According to Kazakh legends, the three jüz were the territorial inheritances of the three sons of the legendary founder-ancestor of the Kazakhs. The word jüz (жүз) also means "a hundred" in Kazakh.

Shoqan Walikhanov believed that when the Golden Horde began to disintegrate, the reasons why Kazakhs created large tribal unions were in order to retain their nomadic territories and secure their rights in the lands where they migrated.

== Senior jüz ==
Historically, the Senior jüz (Kazakh: Ұлы жүз, ۇلى ءجۇز, romanized: Ūly jüz) inhabited the northern lands of the former Chagatai Ulus of the Mongol Empire, in the Ili River and Chu River basins, in today's South-Eastern Kazakhstan and China's Ili Kazakh Autonomous Prefecture (northern Xinjiang). It was also called Üisın jüz.

The first record of the Senior jüz dates to 1748, due to a Tatar emissary of the Tsaritsa who had been sent to the steppe to negotiate the submission of Abul Khair Khan in 1732. According to Nikolai Aristov, the estimated population of the Senior jüz was about 550,000 people in the second half of the 19th century. The territory was conquered by the Kokand Khanate in the 1820s, and by the Russian Empire during the 1850s to 1860s. The Senior jüz Kazakhs were incorporated into the Russian Empire in 1845–1847.

Kazakhstan's ruling elite, including former president Nursultan Nazarbayev, former First Secretary of the Communist Party of Kazakhstan Dinmukhamed Konayev, as well as famous poet Jambyl Jabayev are representatives of the Senior jüz.

There have been several attempts to determine the exact names and nature of top-level clans throughout the 19th and early 20th centuries. However, different studies created vastly different names and population numbers for the steppe clans. Generally accepted names of the first order Senior jüz tribes or clans are:

- Dulat (Kazakh: Дулат, دۋلات, romanized: Dulat)
  - Janys (Kazakh: Жаныс, جانىس, romanized: Janys)
  - Siyqym (Kazakh: Сиқым, سىيقىم, romanized: Siqym)
  - Botbay (Kazakh: Ботбай, بوتباي, romanized: Botbai)
  - Shymyr (Kazakh: Шымыр, شىمىر, romanized: Şymyr)
- Jalayir (Kazakh: Жалайыр, جالايىر, romanized: Jalaiyr)
- Qangly (Kazakh: Қаңлы, قاڭلى, romanized: Qañly)
- Alban (Kazakh: Албан, البان, romanized: Alban)
- Suwan (Kazakh: Суан, سۋان, romanized: Suan)
- Sary-Uysin (Kazakh: Сарыүйсін, سارىءۇيسىن, romanized: Sary-Üisın)
- Shapyrashty (Kazakh: Шапырашты, شاپىراشتى, romanized: Şapyraşty)
- Sirgeli (Kazakh: Сіргелі, سىرگەلى, romanized: Sırgelı)
- Oshaqty (Kazakh: Ошақты, وشاقتى, romanized: Oşaqty)
- Ysty (Kazakh: Ысты, ىستى, romanized: Ysty)
- Shanyshqyly (Kazakh: Шанышқылы, شانىشقىلى, romanized: Şanyşqyly)

=== Khans ===
- Kart-Abulkhayr Khan (1718–1730)
- Zholbarys Khan (1730–1740)
- Abulfeyz Khan (1740–1750)
- Tole Biy (1750–1756)
- Abylai Khan (1756–1771)
- Abilpeyiz Khan (1771–1774)
- Adil Khan (1774–1781)
- Kasym Khan II (1806–1809)
- Tokay Khan (1809–1826)

== Middle jüz ==
The Middle jüz (Kazakh: Орта Жүз, ورتا ءجۇز, romanized: Orta Jüz, also known as Arğyn Jüz [Арғын Жүз]), occupies the eastern lands of the former Golden Horde, in central, northern and eastern Kazakhstan.

The Middle jüz Kazakhs were incorporated into the Russian Empire in 1734–1740.

Some of Kazakhstan's famous poets and intellectuals were born in the Middle jüz territories, including Abay Qunanbayuli, Akhmet Baytursinuli, Shokan Walikhanuli and Alikhan Bokeikhanov.

The Middle jüz consists of the following tribes:

- Argyn (Kazakh: Арғын, ارعىن, romanized: Arğyn)
- Kerei (Kazakh: Керей, كەرەي, romanized: Kerei)
- Naiman (Kazakh: Найман, نايمان, romanized: Naiman)
- Khongirad (Kazakh: Қоңырат, قوڭىرات, romanized: Qoñyrat)
- Qypchak (Kazakh: Қыпшақ, قىپشاق, romanized: Qypşaq)
- Taraqty Kazakh: Тарақты, تاراقتى, romanized: Taraqty)
- Uwaq (Kazakh: Уақ, ۋاق, romanized: Uaq)

== Junior jüz ==
The Junior or Lesser jüz (Kazakh: Кіші Жүз, كىشى ءجۇز, romanized: Kışı Jüz, also known as Alşyn Jüz) occupied the lands of the former Nogai Khanate in Western Kazakhstan.

They originate from the Nogais of the Nogai Horde, which once was placed in Western Kazakhstan, but in the 16th century it was defeated by the Kazakhs and the Russians and Nogais retreated to the Western part of their khanate, to the Kuban River steppes. In the 18th century, they endangered inner Russian cities, so the Russian Empire allied with the Mongolic Kalmyks to supplant the Alshyns and push them back to the Urals. There they formed the Lesser jüz. During the Kazakh-Kalmyk struggles, the Khiva Khanate annexed the Mangyshlak Peninsula to repel Kalmyk raids and managed it for two centuries before the Russian conquest. At the beginning of the 19th century, Kazakhs shifted some to the west, to Astrakhan Governorate, forming Bukey Horde there. When the Kazakh SSR was formed. Bukey Horde was positioned in its most remote, western part, situated geographically in Europe.

The Junior jüz Kazakhs incorporated into the Russian Empire in 1731. Historical leaders of Kazakh resistance against the Russian Empire associated with the Junior jüz include Isatay Taymanuly (Kazakh: Isatai Taimanūly, 1791–1838) and Makhambet Otemisuly (Kazakh: Mahambet Ötemısūly, 1803/4–1846).

The Junior jüz consisted of three groups, subdivided into clans:

- Baiuly (Kazakh: Байұлы, بايۇلى, romanized: Baiūly)
  - Adai (Kazakh: Адай, اداي, romanized: Adai)
  - Alasha (Kazakh: Алаша, الاشا, romanized: Alaşa)
  - Baibaqty (Kazakh: Байбақты, بايباقتى, romanized: Baibaqty)
  - Berish (Kazakh: Беріш, ءبەرىش, romanized: Berış)
  - Jappas (Kazakh: Жаппас, جاپپاس, romanized: Jappas)
  - Masqar (Kazakh: Масқар, ماسقار, romanized: Masqar)
  - Taz (Kazakh: Таз, تاز, romanized: Taz)
  - Tana (Kazakh: Тана, تانا, romanized: Tana)
  - Esentemir (Kazakh: Есентемір, ەسەنتەمىر, romanized: Esentemır)
  - Ysyq (Kazakh: Ысық, ىسىق, romanized: Ysyq)
  - Qyzylqurt (Kazakh: Қызылқұрт, قىزىلقۇرت, romanized: Qyzylqūrt)
  - Sherkesh (Kazakh: Шеркеш, شەركەش, romanized: Şerkeş)
- Alimuly (Kazakh: Әлімұлы, ءالىمۇلى, romanized: Älımūly)
  - Qarakesek (Kazakh: Қаракесек, قاراكەسەك, romanized: Qarakesek)
  - Qarasaqal (Kazakh: Қарасақал, قاراساقال, romanized: Qarasaqal)
  - Tortqara (Kazakh: Төртқара, ءتورتقارا, romanized: Törtqara)
  - Kete (Kazakh: Кете, كەتە, romanized: Kete)
  - Shomekei (Kazakh: Шөмекей, شومەكەي, romanized: Şömekei)
  - Shekti (Kazakh: Шекті, شەكتى, romanized: Şektı)
- Jetyru (Kazakh: Жетіру, جەتىرۋ, romanized: Jetıru)
  - Tabyn (Kazakh: Табын, تابىن, romanized: Tabyn)
  - Tama (Kazakh: Тама, تاما, romanized: Tama)
  - Kerderi (Kazakh: Кердері, كەردەرى, romanized: Kerderı)
  - Kerey (Kazakh: Керейіт, كەرەيت, romanized: Kereiıt)
  - Zhagalbaily (Kazakh: Жағалбайлы, جاعالبايلى, romanized: Jağalbaily)
  - Telew (Kazakh: Телеу, تەلەۋ, romanized: Teleu)
  - Ramadan (Kazakh: Рамадан, رامادان, romanized: Ramadan)

== Family in jüzes ==
In jüzes, a clear purpose of each son in the family is determined. According to the customs and traditions of the Kazakhs, different people were engaged in the upbringing of each son.

- The eldest son went to be raised by his grandparents.
- The youngest son stayed with his parents and subsequently pledged to help the whole family.
- The middle son became a warrior. He was trained in swordsmanship, archery, etc.

To this day, knowledge of one's genealogical tree, including one's jüz, is considered a duty of every Kazakh. Any relative who comes for help (even the most distant one) will definitely receive it.

== See also ==
- Kazakh Khanate
- Zhetysu
- Ethnic demography of Kazakhstan
- List of medieval Mongolian tribes and clans
- Orda (structure)
- Shala Kazakh

== Literature ==
- Svat Soucek, "A History of Inner Asia". Cambridge University Press (2000). ISBN 0-521-65704-0.
- W. W. Bartold, Four studies in history of Central Asia, Leiden: E.J. Brill, 1962.
- Ilkhamov Alisher et al., "Ethnic Atlas of Uzbekistan", Uzbekistan, "Open Society Foundation", 2002, p. 176, ISBN 978-5-86280-010-4 (in Russian)
- Isin A., "Kazakh khanate and Nogai Horde in the second half of the 15th - 16th centuries", Semipalatinsk, Tengri, 2002, p. 22, ISBN 978-9965-492-29-7 (in Russian)
- S. Qudayberdiuli. "Family tree of Turks, Kirgizes, Kazakhs and their Khan dynasties", Alma-Ata, Dastan, 1990 (in Russian)
- S. Kudayberdy-Uly, Family tree of Türks, Kyrgyz, Kazakhs and their Khan dynasties, Alma-Ata, Dastan, 1990 (in Russian)
- M. Tynyshbaev, 'The Uysyn', in Materials on the history of the Kazakh people, Tashkent 1925 (in Russian)
- Yu.A. Zuev, "Ethnic History of the Usuns", Works of the Academy of Sciences of the Kazakh SSR, History, Archeology And Ethnography Institute, Alma-Ata, Vol. 8, 1960. (in Russian)
- А. Т. Толеубаев, Ж. К. Касымбаев, М. К. Койгелдиниев, Е. Т. Калиева, Т. Т. Далаева, перевод с казахского языка С. Бакенова, Ф. Сугирбаева. — История Казахстана. Изд-во «Мектеп», 2006 г. — 240 с ISBN 9965-33-628-8
