= Ybyraiym Bökeev =

Kazakh prince and Russian Army colonel (1833–1865)

Prince Ibrahim Bökeev
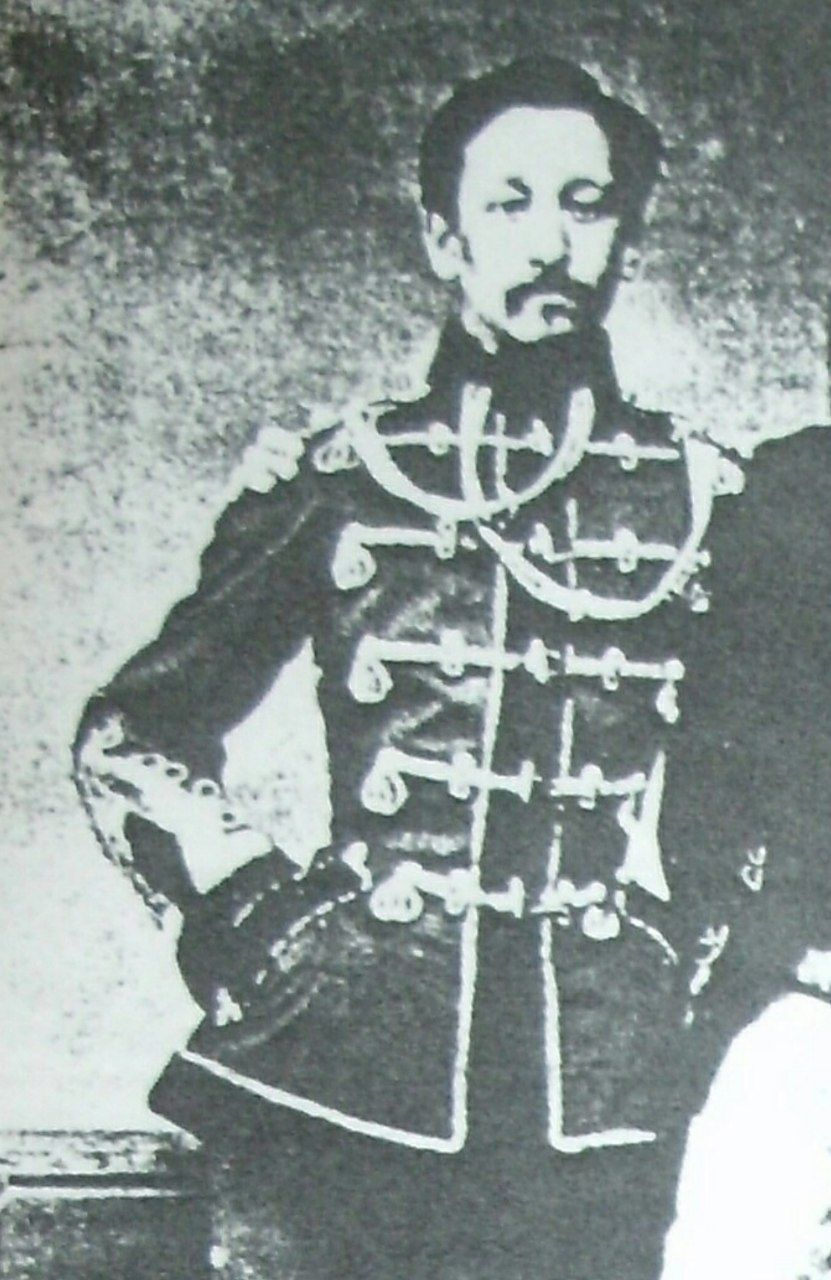
- Born: 1833
- Died: 1865 (aged 31–32)
- Relatives: Jäñgir-Kerei Khan (father); Gubaydulla Chingiskhan (brother)
- Military career
- Allegiance: Russian Empire
- Branch: Imperial Russian Army
- Rank: Colonel

Ibrahim Jäñgırūly Bökeev (Kazakh: ىبىرايىم جاڭگىرۇلى بوكەيەۆ, Cyrillic: Ибраxим Жәңгірұлы Бөкеев; 1833 – 1865), also transcribed from Russian as Ibragim Dzhangerovich Bukeyev (Russian: Ибрагим Джангерович Букеев) (Note: Also written as Chingi‌s Ibragi‌m-Gire‌y Dzhange‌rovich (Russian: Чинги‌с Ибраги‌м-Гире‌й Джанге‌рович)) was a Kazakh prince and colonel of the Imperial Russian Army.

== Biography ==
Ibrahim Bökeev was born in 1833 into a Kazakh Muslim noble family as the son of former Kazakh ruler Jäñgir-Kerei Khan, Khan of the Bukey Horde and his Kazakh wife Fatima. Through his father, Ibrahim was descended from the Töre clan, a clan of direct descendants of Genghis Khan along the line of Jochi Khan. He is the brother of Gubaydulla Chingiskhan, who served as an imperial cavalry general in the Russian Empire. Ibrahim also had two other brothers: Ahmed-Kerei and Saiyp-Kerei.

In 1852, Ibrahim graduated from the Imperial Page Corps and was sent to the His Majesty's Hussar Life Guards Regiment in Orenburg. Between 1853 and 1860, he was engaged in managing the Kazakhs under the Orenburg Governor-General as a guards captain. In January 1853, Emperor of Russia, Nicholas I, granted Ibrahim the title of prince by his decree. The Kazakhs sent documents and petitions addressed to him, hoping that he would become the successor of Jäñgir-Kerei and restore the Kazakh Khanate. However, as he was a Russian imperial military officer, he never did so. In an 1863 document, he is referred to as "colonel of the guard".
