= Gubaydulla Chingiskhan =

Kazakh prince and General of the Cavalry of the Russian Empire (1840–1909)

Sultan Hajji Gubaidullah Jangiruly Chingiskhan
- حاجی عبید الله جهانگیراوغولی چنغیسخان
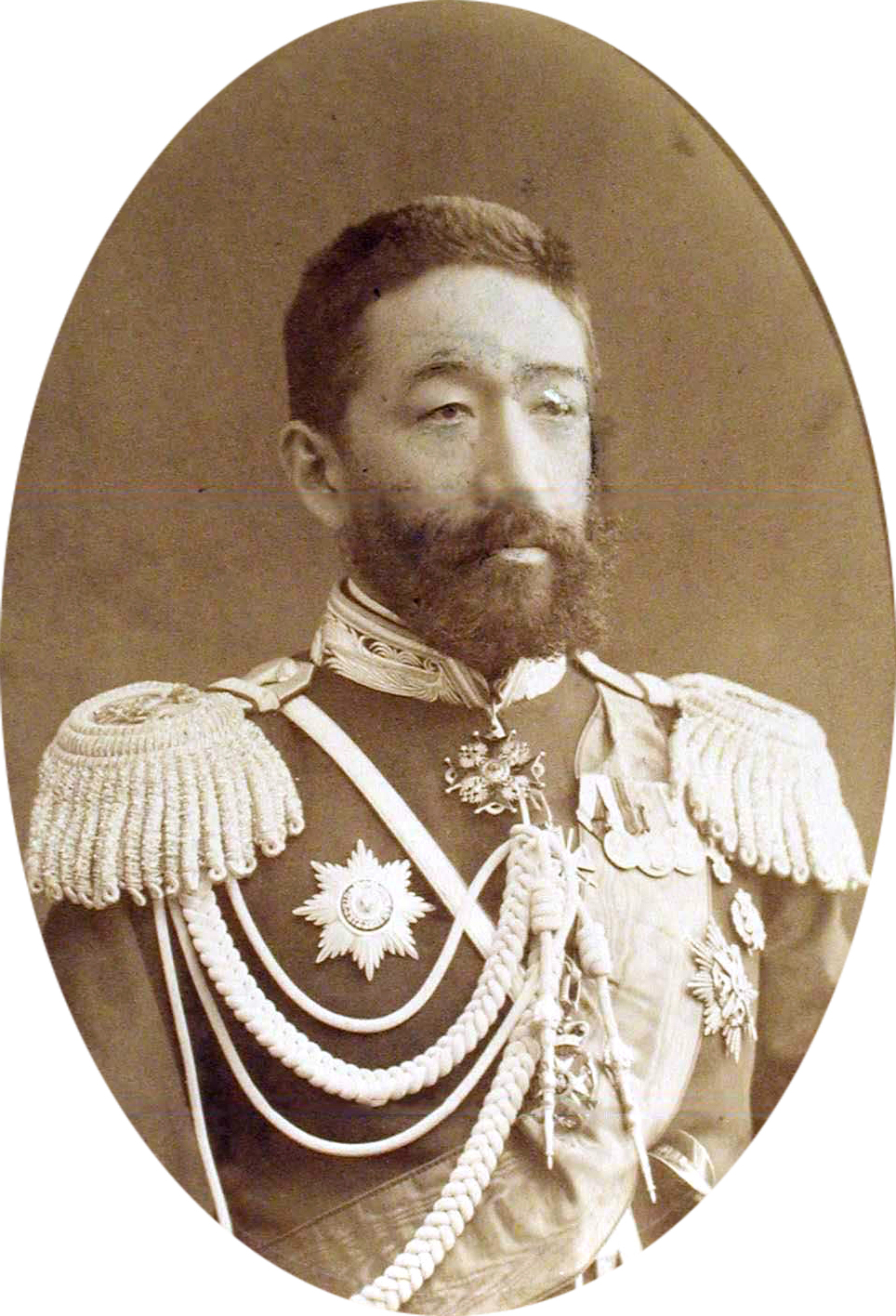
- Born: 19 May 1840; Khan Ordasy, Bukey Horde (now Kazakhstan)
- Died: 14 March 1909 (aged 68); Yalta, Russian Empire
- Relatives: Jäñgir-Kerei Khan (father); Ybyraiym Bökeev (brother)
- Military career
- Allegiance: Russian Empire
- Branch: Imperial Russian Army
- Service years: 1856–1894
- Rank: General of the Cavalry
- Conflicts: Russo-Turkish War (1877–1878)
- Awards: Order of Saint Anna, first class; Order of Saint Stanislaus (2); Order of Saint Vladimir; Golden Weapon for Bravery

Sūltan Hajji Ğūbaidūllah Jäñgırūly Şyñğyshan (Kazakh: حاجی عبید الله جهانگیراوغولی چنغیسخان, Cyrillic: Ғұбайдұллаh Жәңгірұлы Шыңғысхан; 19 May 1840 – 28 February 1909), also transcribed from Russian as Gubaydullah Dzhangerovich Chingiskhan (Russian: Губайдулла‌ Джанге‌рович Чингисха‌н) (Note: Also written as Sultan Khadzhi Gubaydulla Dzhanger Khan ogly (Russian: Султан Хаджи Губайдулла Джангер Хан оглы. Surname also written as Chingis-Khan (Чингис-Хан).) was a Kazakh prince and General of the Cavalry of the Russian Empire.

== Biography ==
Gubaydullah Chingiskhan was born into a Kazakh Muslim noble family on 18 May 1840 in Khan Ordasy, Kazakhstan (then ruled by the Kazakh Khanate). He was the son of former Kazakh ruler Jäñgir-Kerei Khan (Khan of the Bukey Horde) and his Kazakh wife Fatima. Through his father, Gubdaydullah was a direct descendant of Genghis Khan through the line of Jochi (Töre). When Gubdaydullah was 5 years old, his father died of poorly-documented circumstances. As a result, the already-declining juzes of the Sunni Muslim Kazakh Khanate (including the Bukey Horde) were abolished and formally annexed by the Russian Empire by 1847.

Living under Russian colonial rule, Gubaydullah received his primary education at a Russian-language school. When he was 7 years old, he entered the Orenburg Neplyuevsky Cadet Corps, where his brothers Saiyp-Kerei, Ibrahim and Ahmed-Kerei also studied. In 1849, Gubaydullah, together with Yesaul Zhitkov, who was adjutant of the Orenburg Governor General, went to St. Petersburg and was accepted for training in the Imperial Corps of Pages. His brothers were also graduates of the Page Corps. Gubaydullah, Saiyp, Ibrahim, & Ahmed were the only Kazakhs who graduated from this prestigious military educational institution.

After graduating with honors from the Corps of Pages on 16 June 1856, the chambers page Gubaydullah began serving in the Life Guards Cossack Regiment with the rank of cornet and received the title of sultan. In the same year, Gubaydullah and his three brothers were invited to the coronation ceremony of Emperor Alexander II as representatives of the Bukey Horde.

In 1875, Gubaydullah was sent to Orenburg, where he was appointed to the post of special officer for the affairs of the Kazakhs, Bashkirs and Tatars. In 1866, rittmeister Gubaydullah was sent to the order of the ataman of the Don Cossacks, a year later he was sent to serve in the northwestern part of the Russian Empire.

In 1877—1878 he participated in the Russo-Turkish war. On 31 August 1877, as an aide-de-camp to a colonel of the Life Guards of the Cossack Regiment, Chingiskhan was awarded the Golden Weapon for Bravery. On 1 January 1878, he was promoted to major general with enrollment in the His Imperial Majesty's Suite. In the same year, Chingiskhan was awarded the Serbian Grand Officer's Cross. In 1879 he received the Order of St. Vladimir of the third degree. In 1882, Gubaydullah was awarded the Order of St. Stanislav of the first degree and the Montenegrin gold medal "For bravery".

On 30 August 1888, he was promoted to lieutenant general and assigned to the army cavalry reserve. On May 7, 1894, Gubaydulla became a cavalry general with a discharge from service, with a uniform and a pension.

Gubaydullah was the chairman of the Special Commission on waqfs in the Crimea until 7 December 1899. In the last year of his life, he married Russian noblewoman Feodosiya Velinskaya (1858—1931). Two months after the death of Gubaydullah, Feodosiya took on his surname, Chingiskhan. Feodosiya was the first performer of the part of the Snow Maiden in the opera The Snow Maiden by Nikolai Rimsky-Korsakov.

Gubaydullah Chingiskhan died in 1909 and was buried at the Derikoy Muslim cemetery near Yalta.

== Bibliography ==
- Султан Губайдулла Чингисхан — полный генерал от кавалерии: Документы и материалы / Мукатаев Геннадий Кадрович; Ирхина Марина Владиславовна. — СПб: «Издательство М. В. Ирхиной», 2003. — 159 c. ISBN 5-901760-03-4
