= Battle of Aqbulak =

Important battle during Kazakh uprising

- Part of the uprising of Isatay Taymanuly as part of Russian conquest of Central Asia
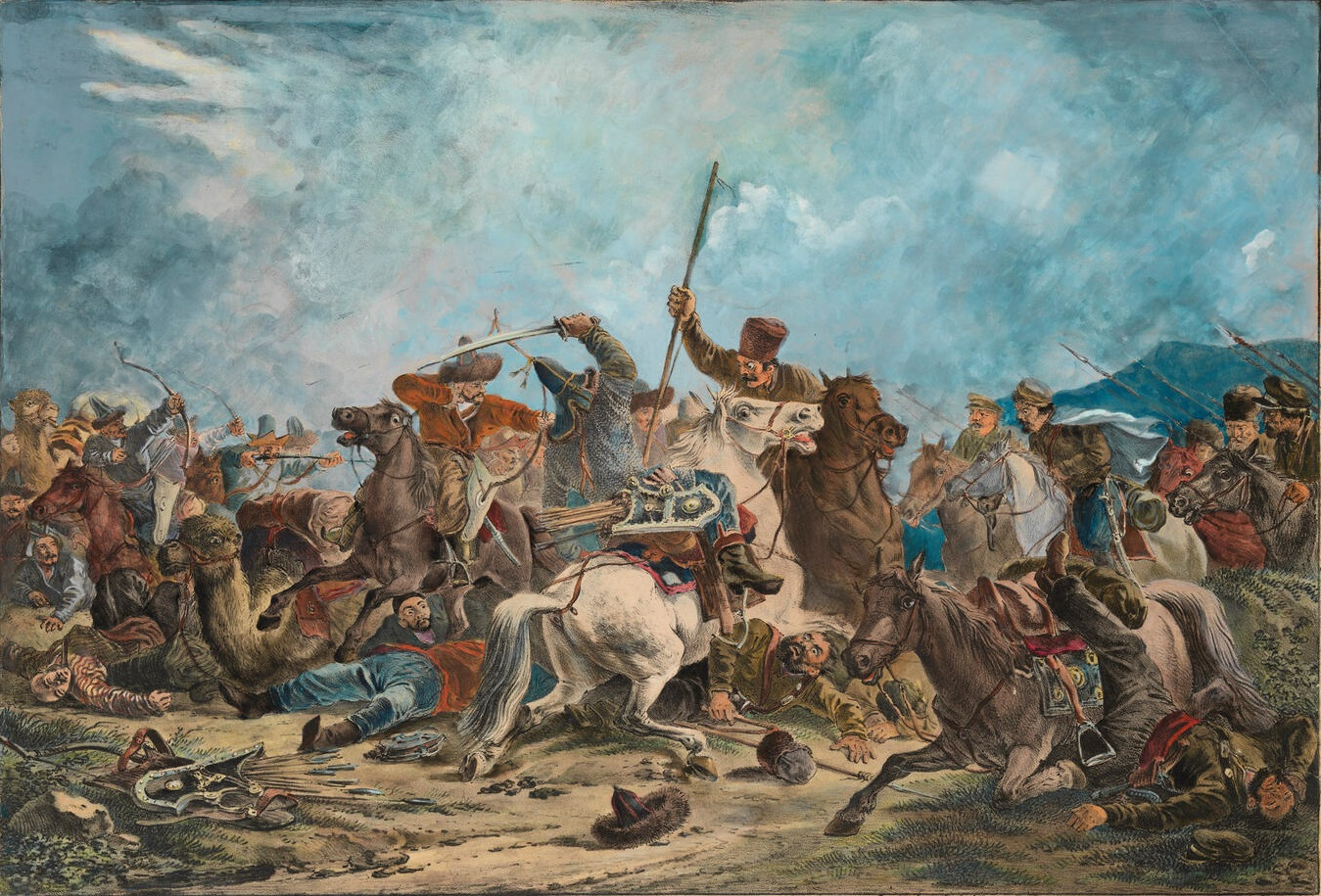
- The battle of the Cossacks with the Kirgyz by Aleksander Orłowski
Date	12 July 1838
Location	Aqbulak river, Bukey Horde (Present-day Kazakhstan)
Result	Russian victory; Uprising suppressed

Belligerents
Russia	Kazakh insurgents

Commanders and leaders
Carl Hecke	Isatay Taymanuly †

Strength
1,330	500

Casualties and losses
7 wounded	80 killed

The Battle of Aqbulak was a battle took place 12 July 1838 near Aqbulak river during uprising of Isatay Taymanuly. Russia's Orenburg and Ural Cossacks with Bashkir loyalist under colonel Carl Hecke fight against Kazakh insurgents and inflicted a crushing defeat on them, killing the leader of the uprising.

== Background ==
In the autumn of 1837, a Kazakh uprising broke out in the Bukey Horde, caused by the lack of land for the nomads. The uprising was led by Isatay Taymanuly from the influential Bayuly feudal family.

The uprising was not eventful, in November the Russians formed a punitive expedition led by Carl Hecke, which on the 15th intercepted the rebels near the town of Tas-Tyube and defeated them, however, the leader was wounded but able to slip away. The Russians also "punished" the Kyrgyz for raiding Siberian fortified lines looted they auls.

== Battle ==
Isatay went to seek help from the Kazakh bandit Kaip Galeev, who had been in Khiva since 1832 to 1835. In the spring of 1838, an expedition was equipped with the same Carl Hecke, it consisted of 1,330 people with 6 cannons, the rebels could only oppose 500 people.

On 12 July punishers overtook the Kazakhs on the Aqbulak River, where they fought. The rebels could not resist firearms, much less artillery, so they almost immediately fled. The leader of the national liberation movement himself died, and with him 80 rebels. The Russians lost only seven wounded of varying severity.
