= First Kazakh Civil War =

Internecine war in the Kazakh Khanate (16th century)

1st Kazakh Civil War
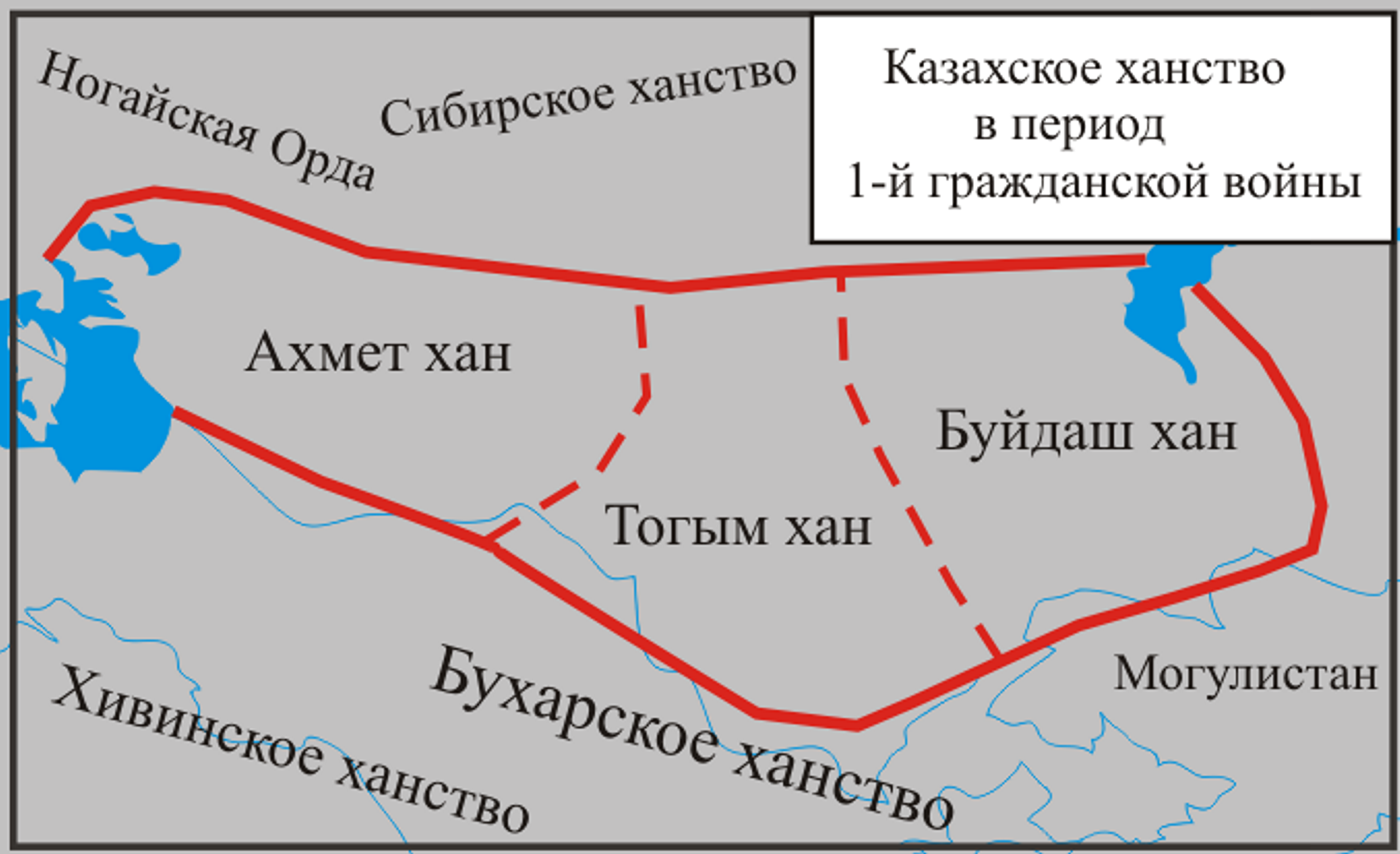
- Confrontation between Khans
Date	1522 – 1538
Location	Kazakh Khanate
Result	Victory for Haqnazar Khan: Unity of the Kazakh Khanate

Belligerents
Tahir Khan # Tugim Khan (Until 1538); Abulqasim Sultan †	Ahmed Khan; Buydash Khan (AWOL)	Haqnazar Khan

The First Kazakh Civil War (1522 – 1538) was an internecine war in the Kazakh Khanate between the descendants of Janibek Khan. The war started just after the death of Qasim Khan.

== Background ==
In the early 16th Century Qasim Khan had united all tribes and nations of Eastern Cumania into one state — the Kazakh Khanate. It was a regional superpower, which could withstand a war with any neighboring country. However the unity of the khanate relied on Qasim Khan's personal authority, and after his death an internecine war started between descendants of Janibek Khan for the throne. This war was named after the civil war between Janibek's descendants.

== History ==
Qasim Khan's heir, Muhammed Khan, was unable to resist the Nogai Horde, which conquered the Torgay River basin. After Muhammed Khan's death, during the reign of Tahir Khan, the Oirat invasion of the Kazakh Khanate began. Tahir Khan failed to suppress powerful sultans of the Kazakh Khanate, such as the ruler of Zhetysu, Buydash Khan, and the ruler of Sighnaq, Ahmed Khan.

Tahir Khan was defeated by the ruler of Moghulistan, Keldi-Muhammad, and fled to Kyrgyzstan, where he died. Then, Tughum Khan became the new ruler of Kazakh lands. But his government was not recognized by Buydash Khan or Ahmed Khan, who both declared themselves as khan. The son of Qasim Khan, Sultan Haqnazar, recognized Tugim as khan.

Ahmed began a campaign against the Nogai horde. Ultimately, he was defeated by the Nogais and was captured by them with fifteen of his sons. In 1535, Ahmed was killed by Orak Baghatur. Sultan Haqnazar captured Ahmed's territories. The western border of the Khanate passed through the Aral Sea.

Sultan Haqnazar inflicted a crushing defeat on Buydash Khan, who fled to Moghulistan. Haqnazar got the western part of Zhetysu.

In 1538, after the death of Tugim Khan, Haqnazar became khan and the civil war ended in his victory.

== Results ==
The Kazakh Khanate reached inner unity. Nevertheless it had lost nearly half of their territory - Western Kazakhstan was captured by the Nogai Horde, Eastern Kazakhstan by Four Oirat, Northern - by the Khanate of Sibir, Moghulistan obtained Western Zhetusy whilst the Khanate of Bukhara got Tashkent. Only during and after the reign of Haq-Nazar were the Kazakhs able to re-consolidate all of Kazakhstan.
