= Alasha =

Alasha may refer to:

- Alasha (tribe), a tribe of Kazakhs
- Helan Mountains (Mongolian: Alaša aγula), a mountain range on the border between western Inner Mongolia and Ningxia, China
- Alxa League, an administrative division in western Inner Mongolia, China
- Alaşa, a village in Azerbaijan
- Alasia, identified with Bronze Age Enkomi, Cyprus
