= Kazakhstan in the Russian Empire =

Russian traders and soldiers began to appear on the northwestern edge of Kazakh territory in the 17th century, when Cossacks established the forts that later became the cities of Oral (Ural'sk) and Atyrau (Gur'yev).

== History ==
Under Tsar Peter I, the foreign policy of the Russian Empire lost much of its earlier dynamism, offensiveness, and breadth. The desire to bring the Kazakh hordes under Russian control remained, but military and political considerations increasingly took precedence over commercial and economic interests. During the Dzungar–Kazakh wars, Russian authorities sought to use the Kazakh juzes as a counterweight to the Dzungars. Alexey Levshin wrote: "The Russian authorities believed that the hordes voluntarily submitting themselves could be used to weaken the Dzungars, whose ruler Galdan Tseren, who had aroused concern even in Peter the Great himself, was still alive at the time." In addition, the Russian government hoped to prevent Kazakh incursions into Bashkiria, Siberia, and the Volga region.

The struggle against the Dzungars and the desire to secure their rear against the Russian Empire prompted a number of rulers of the Junior and Middle juzes to accept Russian allegiance. In accepting the Kazakh juzes under its protection, the Russian government primarily sought to secure the empire's frontiers and gain an ally against possible Oirat incursions. The tsarist authorities hoped that, after accepting Russian allegiance, the Kazakhs would cease raiding Russian settlements and attacking trade caravans, and that they could be employed against other nomadic peoples. These expectations, however, were not fulfilled.

According to Shevchenko, as well as the Encyclopædia Iranica, Oxford Research Encyclopedia of Asian History, Soviet historians Ramazan Suleimenov and Vladimir Moiseev, as well as many pre-revolutionary and other Soviet historians, the allegiance was purely nominal in character. According to the Big Russian Encyclopedia, this did not constitute the incorporation of Kazakhstan into Russia; rather, it involved Abu'l-Khayr Khan's recognition of a relationship of vassalage to the empire. The Russian authorities did not interfere in the internal affairs of the Junior Juz and did not require the Kazakhs to participate in the empire's military campaigns, limiting themselves to the nominal collection of tribute (yasak) and the obligation that the Kazakhs refrain from attacking other nomadic peoples subject to Russia.

In 1730 Abul Khayr, one of the khans of the Junior Jüz, sought Russian assistance. Shortly thereafter the Middle Jüz's Khan Semeke agreed to suzerainty under the same terms. Neither khan remained very loyal to the Russians, but from this point Russian sovereigns began to assert the right to appoint the khans of the Junior and Middle Jüzes and to exert greater influence on them. The Kazakhs in turn began to view the khanate with greater suspicion, as khans increasingly sought Russian help against their rivals within the Khanate. Although the Khanate recovered a degree of independence under Ablai from 1750-1778, his son failed to unite even the Middle Jüz, and in 1798, the Russians attempted direct rule over the Middle Jüz, establishing a tribunal at Petropavlovsk. In 1824, the Russians abolished the khanate of the Middle Jüz. The Senior Jüz managed to remain independent until the 1820s, when the expanding Kokand Khanate to the south forced the Senior Jüz khans to choose Russian protection, which seemed to be the lesser of two evils.

The conquest of Kazakhstan by Russia was slowed by numerous uprisings and wars in the 19th century. For example, uprisings of Isatay Taymanuly and Makhambet Utemisuly in 1836–1838 and the war led by Eset Kotibaruli in 1847–1858 were some of such events of anti-colonial resistance.

In 1863 Russian Empire elaborated a new imperial policy, announced in the Gorchakov Circular, asserting the right to annex "troublesome" areas on the empire's borders. This policy led immediately to the Russian conquest of the rest of Central Asia and the creation of two administrative districts, the General-Gubernatorstvo (Governor-Generalship) of Russian Turkestan and that of the Steppe. Most of present-day Kazakhstan was in the Steppe District, and parts of present-day southern Kazakhstan, including Almaty (Verny), were in the Governor-Generalship.

In the early 19th century, the construction of Russian forts began to have a destructive effect on the Kazakh traditional economy by limiting the once-vast territory over which the nomadic tribes could drive their herds and flocks. The final disruption of nomadism began in the 1890s, when many Russian settlers were introduced into the fertile lands of northern and eastern Kazakhstan. In 1906 the Trans-Aral Railway between Orenburg and Tashkent was completed, further facilitating Russian colonisation of the fertile lands of Semirechie. Between 1906 and 1912, more than a half-million Russian farms were started as part of the reforms of Russian minister of the interior Petr Stolypin, putting immense pressure on the traditional Kazakh way of life by occupying grazing land and using scarce water resources. The Russian settlements have distorted the fundamentally important routes of nomadic seasonal repositioning that Kazakhs have employed for many centuries. Russian appropriation of Kazakh-raised livestock was not uncommon.

Starving and displaced, many Kazakhs joined in the general Central Asian Revolt against conscription into the Russian imperial army, which the tsar ordered in July 1916 as part of the effort against Germany in World War I. In late 1916, Russian forces brutally suppressed the widespread-armed resistance to the taking of land and conscription of Central Asians. Thousands of Kazakhs were killed, and thousands of others fled to China and Mongolia. Some have succeeded, but many have failed and died in travel.

== See also ==
- History of Kazakhstan
