= Boqymaş Şolanūly =

Kazakh warlord (1875–1931)

Boqymaş Şolanūly Боқымаш Шоланұлы
- Khan

Khan of the Aday Kazakhs
- Reign: April 1931–1931
- Coronation: April 1931
- Predecessor: Position established
- Successor: Myrzağali Tynymbaev
- Born: 1875
- Died: 1931 (aged 55–56); Ustyurt Plateau
- Religion: Sunni Islam

Boqymaş Şolanūly or Boqymaş khan (Kazakh: Боқымаш Шоланұлы, Боқымаш хан, romanized: Boqymaş Şolanūly, Boqymaş han), was a Kazakh warlord, one of the leaders of the Aday revolt of 1929–1932. general khan of the Aday clan.

== Biography ==
Boqymaş was born in Ustyurt (modern Mangystau Region) in 1875 in a peasant family.

Until the end of 1930, the future khan lived on the territory of the modern West Kazakhstan Region, Zhympity district, Zhaksybay aul district. Before the revolt, he actively studied Islam.

In the spring of 1931, local residents of a remote part of the Aday district held several meetings and decided to protest against the USSR.

In March of the same year, representatives of the Aday clan elevated Boqymaş to the title of khan. Four members of the khan's council were appointed. Qaramyrza Embergenūly became the deputy monarch, Rahmet Äminūly, Mamai Salğaraūly, Özbek Ertöreūly, Qazaq Şinenūly, Asan Şynğaliūly became military leaders. After the defeat of the revolt, Boqymaş Khan and his son Rahmet were among the 15 executed.
