= Alasa (disambiguation) =

Alasa, or Alaşa, is a municipality in Astara, Azerbaijan.

Alasa or Alaşa may also refer to:

- Alasa Kanya, a female sculptural form on Indian temples
- Alasa Farms, a historic farm complex in New York, US

== See also ==
- Alaska (disambiguation)
