= List of Kazakh khans =

Starting from the formation of the Kazakhs in the mid-15th century, the Kazakhs Khans led both the unified Kazakh Khanate and later the three main Kazakh divisions. Khan is a title for a ruler used by nomadic and semi-nomadic groups throughout Central Asia.

The Kazakhs were originally members of the nomadic Uzbek tribes who, under the leadership of Abu'l-Khayr Khan, migrated from the northwestern part of the Dasht-i Qipchaq south towards Transoxiana in the 1430s and 1440s and attacked parts of the Timurid Empire. Two tribal leaders, Kerei and Janibek, who were themselves descendants of Urus Khan and by extension Genghis Khan, decided to leave the service of Abu'l-Khayr Khan. Those who followed Kerei and Janibek become known as the Uzbek-Kazakhs, Kazakh being a Turkic word which roughly translates as "vagabond" or "freebooter". Abu'l-Khayr Khan died in 1468, and for the next three decades many of his followers began recognizing the authority of the Uzbek-Kazakh khans - Kerei, Janibek, and Kerei's son Burundyq. By 1500, however, a new leader known as Muhammad Shaybani Khan united many of the Uzbeks under his control and pushed further south into modern-day Uzbekistan, while the Uzbek-Kazakhs, who by this time were known simply as Kazakhs, remained in the steppe. The Uzbeks continued to be ruled by Muhammad Shaybani Khan and his descendants, where they underwent Karlukification and thus lost Kipchak origins in response to form the modern-day Karluk Uzbeks; while the Kazakhs were ruled by the descendants of Kerei and Janibek, and stayed Kipchak.

Approximate areas occupied by the three Kazakh jüz in the early 20th century.: Junior juz / Middle juz / Great juz

After the death of Tauke Khan in 1718 the Kazakh Khanate ceased to exist as a unified entity. Instead, the three different jüz, or hordes, of the Kazakhs became independent units, each with their own khan. Throughout the 18th century the Russians continued to expand into the steppe region. As part of diplomatic relations, the Kazakh khans, especially from the Junior jüz in the west, would declare allegiance to Russia and the tsar, though these declarations had no actual impact beyond words. By the turn of the 19th century, however, the Russians began to exert authority over the Kazakhs and the position of khan. The Russians chose to not appoint a new khan for the Middle jüz after 1819 and abolished the position of khan in the Junior jüz after Shergazy Khan's death in 1824.

The Russians also effected the creation of a new line of khans, the "Inner Horde" or "Bokei jüz". This jüz was made up of members of the Junior jüz who were allowed in 1801 to use pastures west of the Ural river in Russian territory. The position of khan in the Bokei jüz lasted until 1845, when it was also abolished by the Russians.

In the 1840s a man named Kenesary, a descendant of Ablay Khan, launched a rebellion against Russian rule, which by this time extended across most of modern-day Kazakhstan. He was recognized by most Kazakh leaders as Kenesary Khan, and is considered in Kazakh histories today to be an official khan, though he was never recognized by the Russian authorities as such. Though the Russians pursued Kenesary for years across the steppe, he had broad support among the Kazakhs and as a result was able to eluded capture until 1847, when he was executed in northern Kyrgyzstan.

The following list shows the known khans of the Kazakhs from 1456 to 1847.

Kazakh Khans before the split into the three jüzs:
Name	Ruling period	Name in Kazakh
Kerei	1456–1473	Керей, كيري
Janibek	1473–1480	Жәнібек, جانيبك
Burunduk	1480–1511	Бұрындық (Мұрындық), بورونديق
Qasim	1511–1518	Қасым, قاسم
Muhammed	1518–1523	Мұхаммед, محمد
Tahir	1523–1533	Тахир, طاهر
Buidash	1533–1538	Бұйдаш, بويداش
Ahmed	1533–1535	Ахмед, أحمد
Toghym	1535–1537	Тоғым, توغيم
Haqnazar	1538–1580	Хақназар, حقنازار
Shygai	1580–1582	Шығай, شیغای
Tauekel	1582–1598	Тәуекел, تاوكل
Esim	1598–1628	Есім, عاصم
Jangir	1628–1652	Жәңгір, جهانگیر
Batyr Khan (ru)	1652-1680	Батыр, بهادور
Tauke	1680–1715	Тәуке, تاوكي
Qaiyp	1715–1718	Қайып, كايب
Bolat	1718–1729	Болат, بولات
Abulmambet Khan (ru)	1729–1771	Әбілмәмбет, أبو المامبيت
Ablai Khan	1771–1781	Әбілмансұр, أبو المنصور
Kenesary Khan	1841–1847	Кенесары, كينيساري

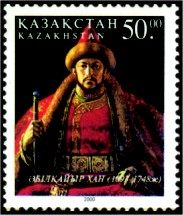
Stamp of Kazakhstan devoted to Abul Khair Khan

Junior jüz khans:
Name	Ruling period	Name in Kazakh
Abu'l-Khair	1718–1748	Әбілқайыр, أبو الخير
Nur Ali	1748–1786	Нұр Әли, نور علي
Eraly	1791–1794	Ералы, إيرالي
Esim	1795–1797	Есім, عاصم
Aishuaq	1797–1805	Айшуақ, ايشواق
Sher Ghazi	1812–1824	Шер Ғази, شيرغازي

Khans of Bokei:
Name	Ruling period	Name in Kazakh
Bokei	1801–1815	Бөкей, بوكي
Shygai	1815–1823	Шығай, شیغای
Jäñgir	1823–1845	Жәңгір, جهانگیر

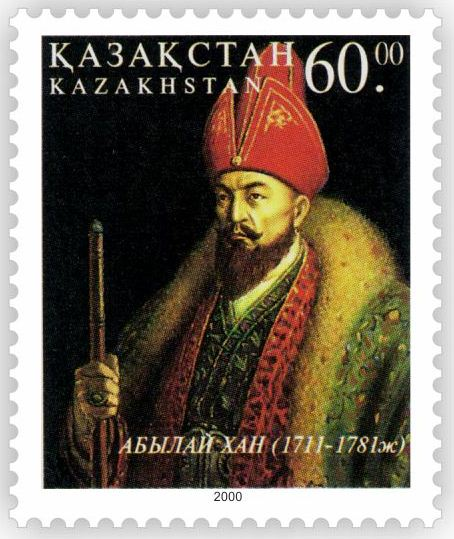
Stamp from Kazakhstan featuring fantasy image of Ablai Khan

Middle jüz khans:
Name	Ruling period	Name in Kazakh
Sameke	1719–1734	Сәмеке, سميكي
Abilmambet	1734–1771	Әбілмәмбет, أبو المامبيت
Abu'l-Mansur	1771–1781	Әбілмансұр, أبو المنصور
Wäli	1781–1819	Уәли, الوالي
Gubaidullah	1819–1822	Ғұбайдуллаh, عبيد الله

The last official khan during the Russian Empire:
Name	Ruling period	Name in Kazakh
Kenesary	1841–1847	Кенесары, كينيساري

Central Asian Revolt of 1916:
Name	Ruling period	Name in Kazakh
Äbdiğapar Janbosynūly	1916–1917	Әбдіғаппар Жанбосынұлы, عبد الغبار جانبوسينولي
Ospan Şolaqūly	1916–1917	Оспан Шолақұлы, وـســپــاـنـ شــوـلــاـكــوـۆ
