= Haqnazar Khan =

Khan of the Kazakh khanate from 1538 to 1580

Khaknazar Khan حقنظر خان
- Khan; Khanzada; Sultan; Shah-i-Turan
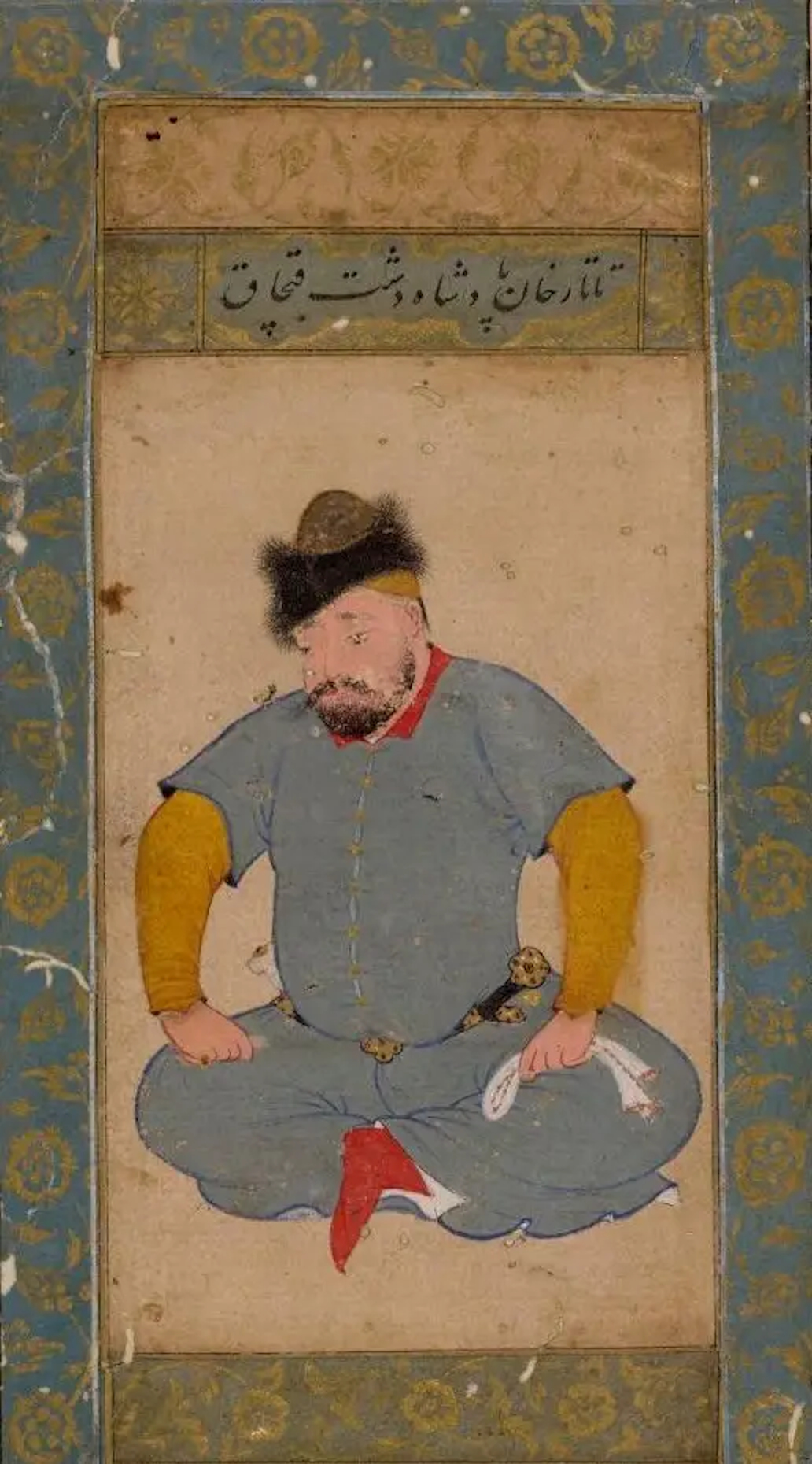
- "Padishah (Emperor) of Dast-i Qipchaq", Possible portrait of Haqnazar Khan.

Khan of the Kazakh Khanate
- Reign: 1538–1580
- Predecessor: Togym Khan
- Successor: Shygay Khan
- Born: 1509; Kazakh Khanate
- Died: May 19, 1580; Turkistan, Kazakh Khanate
Names
- حقنظرحیدر سلطان بن قاسم خان; Haqnazar Haider Sūltan bin Kasym Khan
- House: House of Borjigin
- Dynasty: Tore; House of Urus Khan
- Father: Kasym Khan
- Mother: Khanik Sultan Khanim
- Religion: Sunni Islam

Khaknazar Haider Sultan bin Kasym Khan (Kazakh: حقنظر حیدر سلطان بن قاسم خان), commonly known as Khaknazar Khan, was the khan of the Kazakh khanate from 1538-1580. He was the second-oldest son of Kasim Khan and the younger brother of Muhammed Khan.

The Kazakh Khanate saw a revival under the leadership of Khaknazar, whose rule lasted for more than 40 years. During Haqnazar's reign, the Kazakh Khanate began to regain its former power achieved during the time of Kasym Khan. Khaknazar Khan united the scattered inhabitants of the steppe from the former Kazakh Khanate after the 1520s.

== Origin ==
Haqnazar also known as Haqq-Nazar or Khaknazar Khan or Ak Nazar Khan, was the son of Kasym Khan and Khanik Sultan Khanim. Haqnazar lived during the reign of Taiyr Khan and Buidash Khan under one of the Nogai princes.

Haqnazar's name comes from the Arabic word "хақ", which means "truth, correctness" and the Turko-Persian word "Nazar," which means "vision". For much of his early life, Haqnazar was simply called by his middle name "Haider", which was given to him in honor of Kasım Khan's Shaybanid uncle, Sheikh Haidar. He only went by "Haqnazar" after succeeding Ahmed Khan and Toghym Khan as the ruler of the Kazakhs.

== Reign and conquests ==
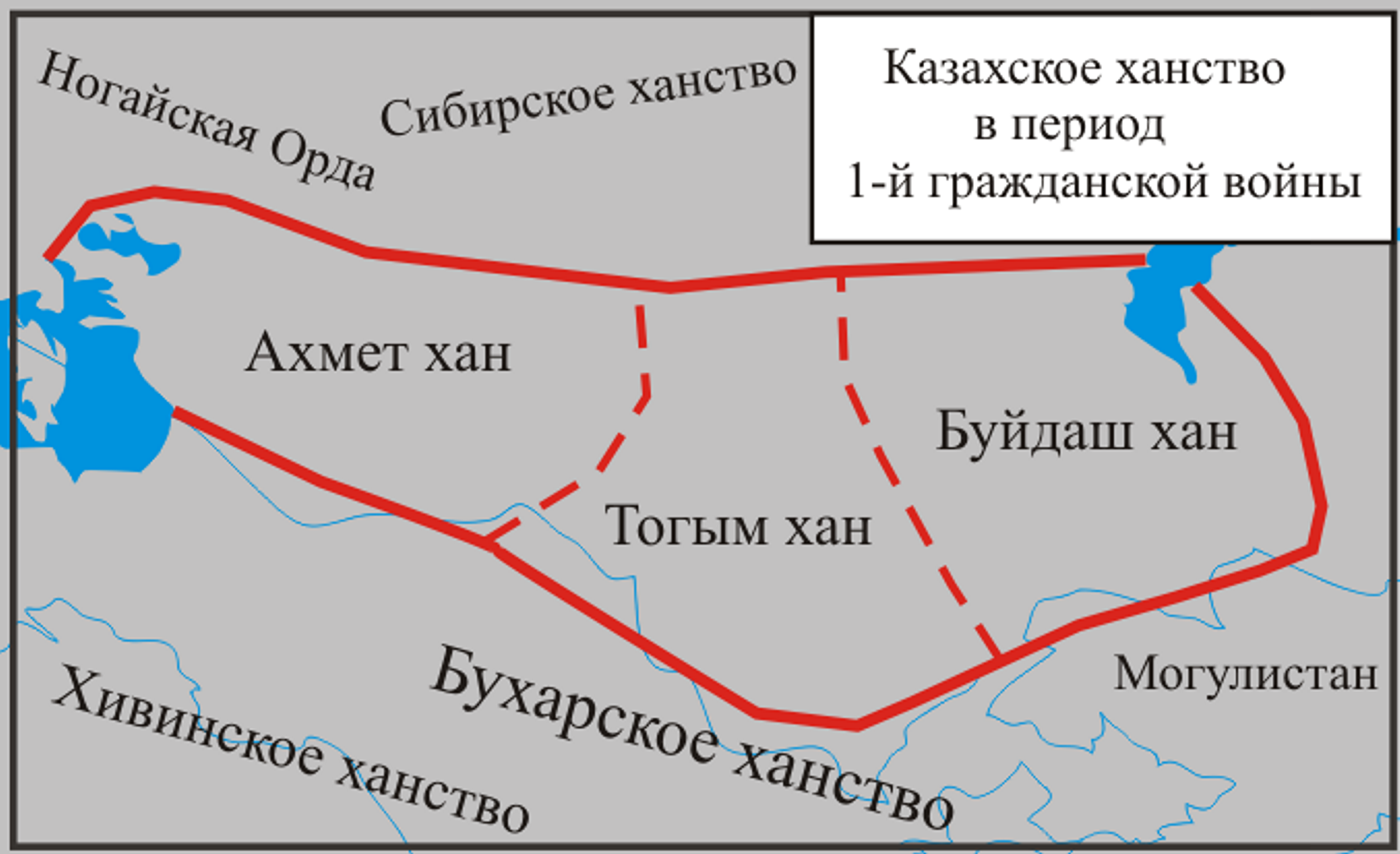
Map of the Kazakh Khanate in 1535. During the First Kazakh Civil War.

Haqnazar had assisted Taiyr Khan and Tugim Khan during the First Kazakh Civil War. However as Taiyr Khan died on Kyrgyzstan, and Tugim died in 1538, Haqnazar assumed the title Khan and captured Ahmed Khan's territories in the west to capturing Buydash Khan's territories in the east. This ended in victory of Haqnazar and his ruling nation of Kazakh Khanate faced competition from several directions: the Nogai Horde in the west, the Khanate of Sibir in the north, Moghulistan in the east and the Khanate of Bukhara in the south.

Haqnazar Khan began to liberate the occupied Kazakh lands. He returned the northern regions of Saryarka to the Kazakh Khanate. Having begun a campaign against the Nogai Horde, Haqnazar reconquered Saray-Juk from the Nogai Horde and the surrounding Kazakh territories as well. In the fight against the Khivan Khanate, the Kazakhs conquered the Mangyshlak Peninsula. Haqnazar began a campaign against Moghulistan to incorporate Jetisu into the Kazakh Khanate. The campaign ended with defeat with the Oirats joining the war in favor of Moghulistan and resulted in victory for Moghulistan. However, in the north, there was a threat from the Khanate of Sibir, led by Kuchum Khan. Kuchum was soon defeated and Haqnazar reunited the Kazakh tribes and became the sole ruler of the Kazakh Khanate, the first to do so since Taiyr Khan. In doing so, Haqnazar was bestowed with the title "Shah-i-Turan" (Persian for "King of Turan").

In 1570, Haqnazar defeated the Nogai Horde at the Battle of Emba reached Astrakhan, but were repelled by Russian forces.

== See also ==
- List of Kazakh khans

== Sources ==
- History of Kazakhstan to 1700 Encyclopædia Britannica Online.
