= Alasha tribe =

Kazakh tribe

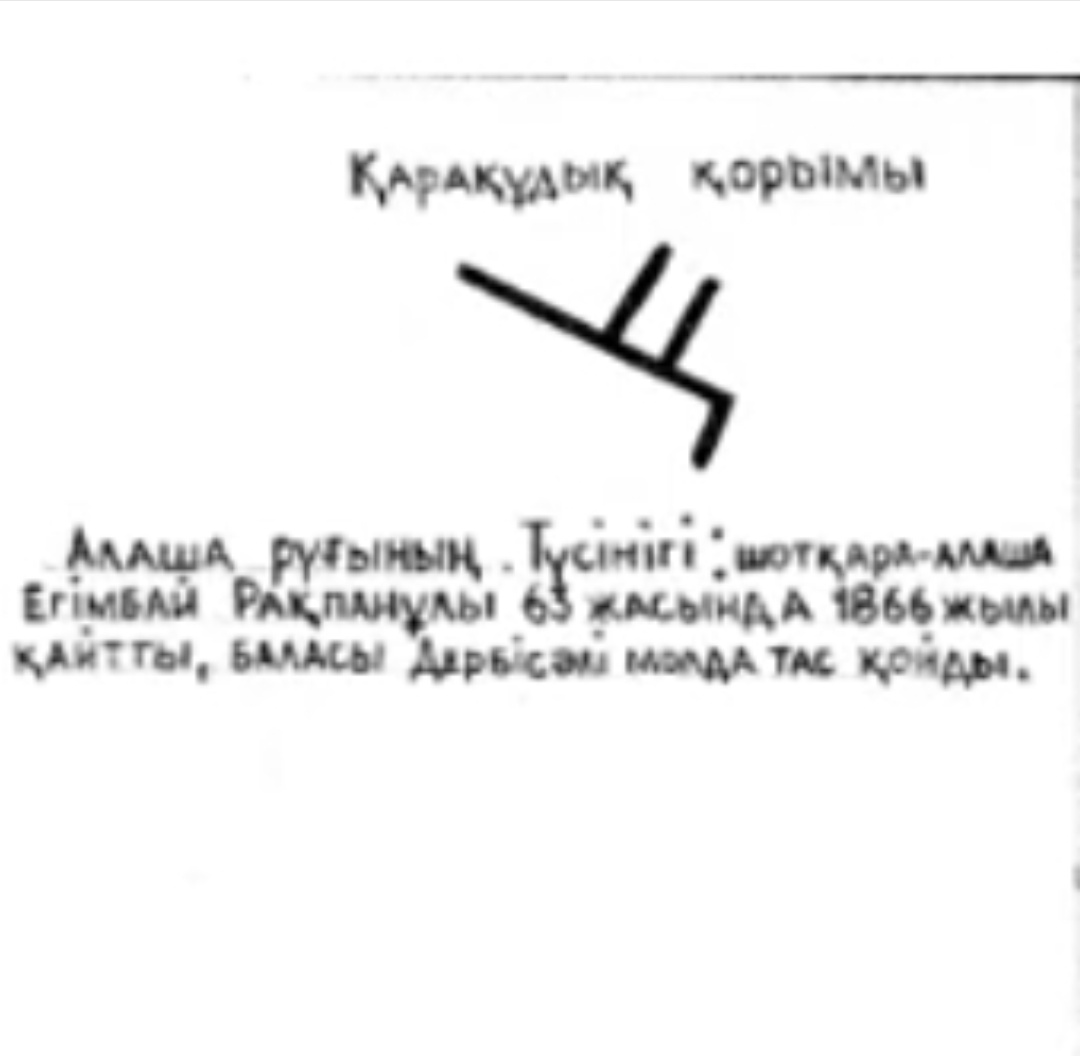
Alasha Shotqara Tanbasy(Clan Symbol of Alasha tribe, Shotqara clan)

Alasha is one of the Kazakh tribes. Alasha is a member of the Bai-Uly (Rich Son) tribe confederation, which is a part of Kishi Zhuz (Minor Hundred). Bai-Uly includes 12 tribes – Alasha, Berish, Adai, Taz, Altyn, Baibakty, Zhappas, Kyzylkurt, Esentemir, Maskar, Sherkesh, Tana. The battle cry of Alasha is "BaiBarak!". In 1897, members of the Bai-Uly tribe confederation numbered 600,000, or 16.2% of all Kazakhs.

== Alasha clans ==
Alasha is subdivided into 35 different clans. These are: tokbas, akberli', shotqara, atms, sary', kozhamberli', kwdaiberdi', qo'beq, baibarak, zhomart, karabatr, malbasar, ma'mbet, botpanai, baida'ulet, baiseu, koisarw', esnazar, koidw'kwl, tyki', kojaghwl, malai, toghai, maimak, dosai, bo'qes, atalk, kozw'beq, a'iti'mbet, karabwra, bojan, baramw'k, qo'bi'lei, tokberli', kongrbo'riq, jabu.

== Origin ==
Ulaš-oğli: in Russian chronicles [141]: Ulashevichi; in Hungarian-Latin documents mentioned as Olaas (pron. Olash). [142] According to opinion of Professor, Historian of Ukrainian History at Harvard University Omeljan Pritsak their nomad camps stretched along the Samara River. [143] Ulaš < Turk. ulaš – «achieve, reach». [144]

Several hypotheses have been formed as to the origins of the Alasha tribes. Based on comparisons of ethnic shapes and tribe symbols, or tamga, some researchers believe that the Alasha are descended from medieval Naimans. However, some Alasha clans have tribal symbols similar to those of the Great Zhuz tribes, Albani and Dulat. Moreover, both the Alasha and Albani tribes encompass the clan Konyr-Borik, suggesting further connections to the Albani tribe. It has also been suggested that the Alasha are descendants of Alans.

In favor of the hypothesis that the Alasha descend from the Naiman there is a physical resemblance of the Alasha people, with the Mongols, Dakh-Oguz-Qypchaq. There is also the possibility that Alasha are descendants of the ancient Khalaj people, who lived in Central Asia.

In Russian chronicles, the Alasha are referred to as the Ulashevichi. In The Lay of Igor's Warfare, an old Russian legend, it is written that Ulashevichi captured Vladimir, the son of Prince Igor Svyatoslavich.

In another Ukrainian chronicles in the book " Prince Igor. Knight of Red Shields", Alasha tribe is mentioned under name Ulashevichi. In this book Khan Hzak (Hza, Kzak) was feasting after victorious battle of near Kaiala river (possibly modern Kalmius river) (where Vladimir, the son of Prince Igor Svyatoslavich was captured) with Konchak (Könchek) Khan they were discussing further military campaigns against Rus. Alasha (Ulashevichi) and Berish (Burchevichi) clans supported Khan Hzak (Hza, Kzak) in attacking Severians (Slavic tribal alliance) in Seim (Posemye), while Konchak (Könchek) Khan insisted on attacking Kyiv. Khan Hzak (Hza, Kzak) with his supportive clans Alasha (Ulashevichi) and Berish (Burchevichi) campaigned in Posemye as well as Putyvl ( today city in north-east Ukraine, in Sumy Oblast) devastating its vicinity.

"And he invaded their lands and burned their villages. He also burned a fortress near the Putyvl."

== Geography ==
In 1801, Bukei Khan led some Alasha to the right bank of the Ural River, and founded a Khanate Bukey (Inner Horde). Nowadays, the people of Alasha live mainly in the West Kazakhstan, Aktobe and Atyrau oblasts of Kazakhstan an Astrakhan region of modern Russia(known as Astrakhan khanate) which borders with Atyrau region.

== Alasha River ==
- There is an Alasha River, a tributary of the Yenisei, in the West Sayan mountains and on the Aristov's assumption, this place is an ancestral home to the Alasha.

== See also ==
- Kazakh tribes
