= Battle of Emba =

Battle between the Kazakh Khanate and Nogai Horde

Battle of Emba (1570)
- Part of the Kazakh–Nogai Wars
Date	1570
Location	Emba, Kazakhstan
Result	Kazakh victory: Ak-Murza expelled from his "ancestral yurt"

Belligerents
Kazakh Khanate	Nogai Horde

Commanders and leaders
(Kazakh Khanate) Haqnazar Khan	(Nogai Horde) Ak-Murza

The Battle of Emba was a military confrontation between Kazakh forces led by the Kazakh Khan, Haqnazar against the Nogai Horde in 1570.

The battles was reported by a Russian envoy in Crimea stating the Kazakhs had defeated the Altyuly Nogais who roamed in the region of Emba river. A Nogai named Devey, who arrived in Crimea, stated that:

"the Kazakh hordes under Ak Nazar Tsar defeated the Nogai murzas, the children of the Shikhmamaevs.""

"On August 20, Ofonasy, Fedor, Ivan, and Nikifor were told by Pyotr Ibakov, Sobanya Rezanov, the Nogai Seundyukov, and Bigildey Razgozin that a Nogai Tatar named Devey, a man of Ak-Murza, had arrived from Azov to the Tsar. And he told the Tsar that the Kazakh hordes and Ak Nazar, the Tsar, had slain the children of the Nogai murzas of the Shikhmamayev clan."

The defeat of the Altyuly Horde of the Nogais in the Aral region by the troops of Haqnazar Khan defeated the Altyuly, after which some of them migrated to the Nogais on the Yaik River. Ak-Murza admitted that he had been expelled from his "ancestral yurt".
