= Ahmet Khan =

Khan of the Kazakh Khanate

Aḥmed Khan احمد خان Ахмед хан
- Khan; Khanzada; Sultan; Shah-i-Turan

7th Khan of the Kazakh Khanate
- Reign: 1533–1535
- Coronation: 1533
- Predecessor: Tahir Khan
- Successor: Haqnazar Khan

9th Khan of the Kazakh Khanate
- Reign: 1535–1536
- Coronation: 1535
- Predecessor: Haqnazar Khan
- Successor: Toghym Khan
- Born: Kazakh Khanate
- Died: 1536; Kazakh Khanate
- Spouse: Jan Mahabbat Begum
- احمد شاه بن جانیش سلطان; Aḥmed Shāh bin Janysh Sultan
- House: House of Borjigin
- Dynasty: Tore, House of Urus Khan
- Father: Janysh Sultan
- Mother: Mahfiruz Begum
- Religion: Sunni Islam

Aḥmed Shāh bin Janysh Sultan (Kazakh: احمد شاه بن جانیش سلطان, Ахмед шах бин Жаныш сұлтан, romanized: Ahmed Şah bin Janyş Sūltan), also known as Ahmed Khan, was a Khan of the Kazakh Khanate who ruled the western part of modern-day Kazakhstan as well as the upper reaches of the Syr Darya river from 1533 to 1536. Through his father, Janysh Sultan, he was a nephew of the great ruler Qasim Khan, the fourth khan of the Kazakh Khanate. Ahmed resided in Hazrat-e-Turkistan, the capital and largest city of the Kazakh Khanate, as well as Sawran, another major Kazakh settlement established during the time of his uncle and father. Ahmed also lived in northern Kazakhstan near modern-day Astana and Pavlodar for much of his life, as he fought a war of succession for the Kazakh throne.

== Biography ==
After the death of Kasim Khan, presumably around in 1521, his oldest-son, Muhammad Khan, (aka Mamash Khan) became the new khan. Muhammad's reign was short-lived. In 1522, a civil war broke out between the descendants of Janibek Khan for the throne. When Muhammad Khan was killed in 1523, he was succeeded by Tahir Khan, son of Ádik Sultan and one of Janibek Khan's grandsons. Under his rule, the civil war continued. After Tahir's death, Toǵym was proclaimed as the new Khan, but his succession was not recognized by Budiash, the ruler of Jetisu, or Ahmed, the ruler of Sygnak, who both declared themselves Khan. To resolve the conflict, the Kazakh Khanate was split into three kingdoms. Assuming himself to be the most powerful ruler in Central Asia, Ahmed Khan proclaimed himself the "Shah-i-Turan" (Persian for "King of Turan"), becoming the first Kazakh ruler to assume this unconventional title.

In 1535, Ahmed Khan was deposed and overthrown by Aziz Sultan, a Kazakh noble. Six months later in 1536, Ahmed again ruled in the upper reaches of the Syr Darya, and attacked the Nogai Horde which defeated him and captured him along with his fifteen sons. Ahmed Khan was killed by Orak Batyr, the son of a noble Nogai Beyy Alchagira who was also killed earlier by the Kazakhs. After Ahmed's death, all the territories that were under his control was captured by Haqnazar, who managed to end the feud and restore the unity of the Kazakh Khanate.
