= Akmola Regional Museum of History and Local Lore =

Museum in Kazakhstan

- Ақмола облыстық тарихи-өлкетану музейі (Kazakh); Акмолинский областной историческо-краеведческий музей (Russian)
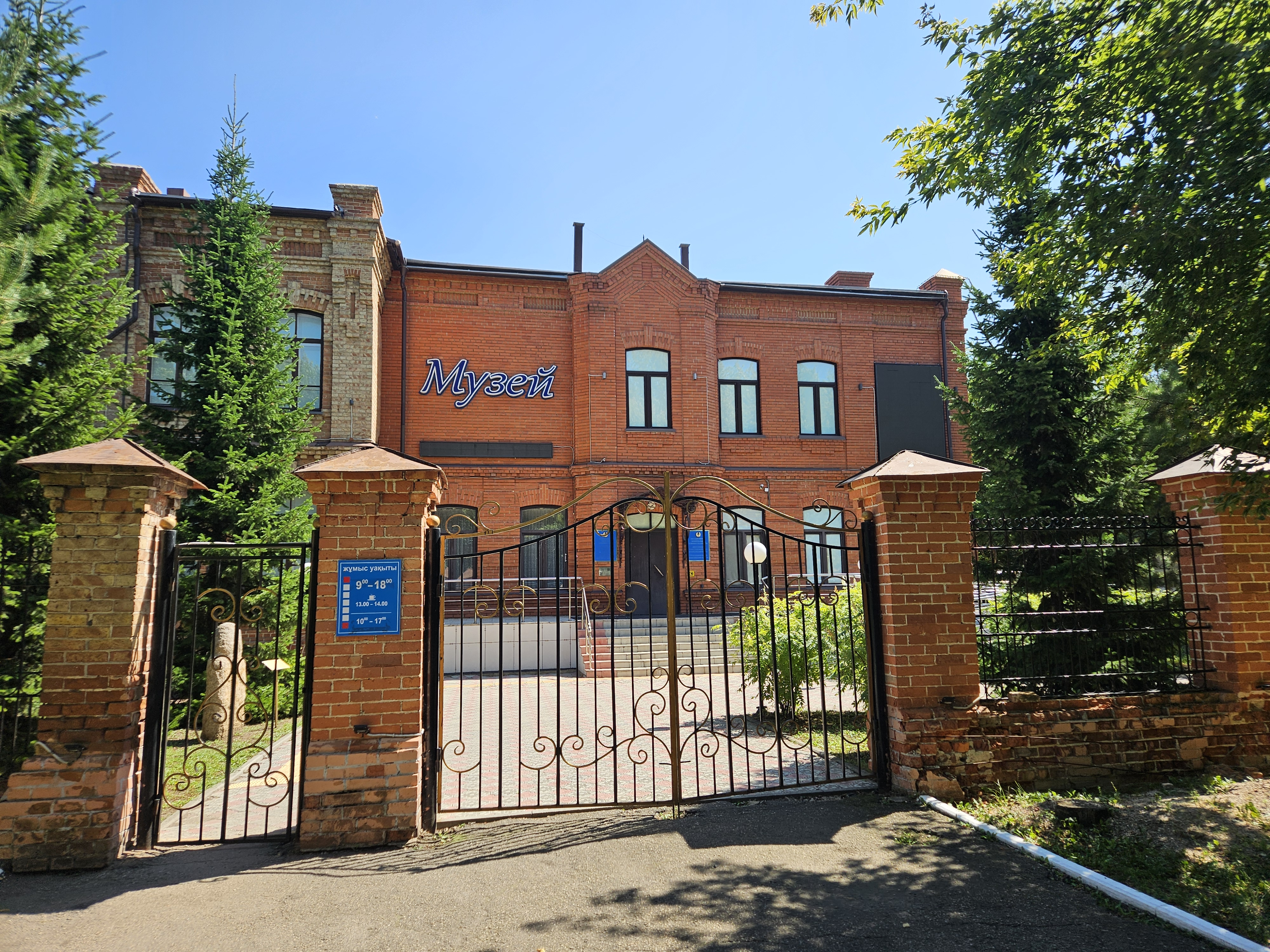
- View of the museum building
- Established: 1920; 106 years ago
- Location: Ramazan Elebayev Street, 35, Kokshetau, Kazakhstan
- Coordinates: 53.2869°N 69.3829°E
- Type: Archaeology, ethnography
- Collection size: 83000+
- Website: akmomuzey.kz/en

The Akmola Regional Museum of History and Local Lore (Note: Kazakh: Ақмола облыстық тарихи-өлкетану музейі; Aqmola oblystyq tarihi-ölketanu muzeiı; IPA: [ɑqmɔˈɫɑ oblɯsˈtɯq tʰɑrɯjˈxɪ (w)ølʲkʲetʰɑno̙͡w mʊˌzʲeˈjɘ]; Russian: Акмолинский областной историческо-краеведческий музей; Akmolinskiy oblastnoy istorichesko-krayevedcheskiy muzey; IPA: [ɐkˈmolʲɪnskʲɪɪ̯ ɐbɫɐˈsnoɪ̯ ɪstɐˈrʲit͡ɕɪskʲə krə(ɪ̯)ɪˈvʲet͡ɕːɪskʲɪɪ̯ mʊˈzʲeɪ̯]) is a museum in Kokshetau, Kazakhstan. The museum is one of the oldest in Kokshetau, having been founded in 1920 and houses an impressive collection of over 83,000 individual pieces that tell the story of the region's rich cultural heritage, history, and traditions. In addition the main branch of the museum, the institution manages several other museums in Akmola Region.

== Description ==
=== History ===
The museum is located in the center of Kokshetau and one of the oldest cultural enterprises of the Akmola Region, which was founded in 1920 as local history museum in Kokshetau in the district department of public education, as a museum of visual aids.

Since January 1945, the district museum became the Kokshetau regional local history museum in connection with foundation of Kokshetau region in 1944. In those days, the museum was in the former mosque building in the center of the town.

Since 1974, the museum has been situated in the building not far from central square of Kokshetau. It is a monument of history and architecture, which is under state protection. It is a two-story brick building, built in 1904.

In 2000, the museum received the status of Akmola Regional Local History Museum, because Kokshetau became the center of Akmola region.

The first large-scale reconstruction was carried out in 2012.

=== Collection ===
The Akmola Regional Museum of History and Local Lore has an extensive collection of artifacts. The museum's main fund has about 83 000 units. The museum's collection contains many archeological finds from the Akmola Region, including ancient bones, and tools.

=== Galleries ===
The museum has six halls, each of which is dedicated to a specific topic:

- Hall of Nature;
- Hall of "Natural history"
- Hall of "Great steppe civilization"
- Hall of "History of Akmola region XlX"
- Hall of "History of Akmola region XX c"
- Hall of "History of modern Kazakhstan"
- Showroom

=== Branches ===
In addition to the main museum in Kokshetau, Akmola Regional Museum of History and Local Lore operates seven other museums in the region.
