= Nikolai Aristov =

Russian Turkologist (1847 – c. 1903)

Nikolai Aleksandrovich Aristov (Russian: Николай Александрович Аристов; 1847 – c. 1903) was a Russian Turkologist, who utilized his experience, education, and access to official information he had as a fairly high-level official in the Turkestan czarist administration, to accumulate and analyze the ethnographic and ethnic history of the Central Asian peoples.

== Career ==
Aristov came from a staff-officer family. After graduation from Kazan University with a degree in law sciences, the seventeen-year-old was sent to Tobolsk as an office assistant, then a provincial secretary and an auditor-bookkeeper of the provincial treasury office, earning 3rd degree St. Stanislav's award in 1868, and the appointed a clerk of Jetisu (Russian: Семиречье) provincial board and a special assignments official at the office of military governor. From that time all his further service was connected with the Turkestan general-governorship.

Aristov joined the vigorous activity of colonial authorities in the newly created Semirechie province within the Turkestani general-governorship, heading a Semirechie prison committee. In 1871 the forces of the Turkestani general-governorship started a military campaign against Kuldja Khanate, seized by the ruler of Uighur state Yetishar Yakub-bek. Aristov directly participated in the military actions, storming the city-fortress of Kuldja, and received a 2nd degree St. Stanislav award. After the campaign, Aristov headed the Office of Kuldja affairs.

In 1872 Aristov was sent to Tashkent to work as a clerk in the commission drafting a "Practice of governorship in the Turkestani Governing Generalship". In 1873-74 he chaired a traditional congresses of Biys (Türkic for Princes of indigenous people) for resolution of land disputes in Semipalatinsk, Sergiopol districts and Semirechie province. <--!In Türkic nomenclature, at that time Aristov was a representative of the Yabgu/lesser Kagan (the Governor General appointed by the Great Kagan's/Czar Imperial Court), i.e. a lesser Yabgu or a Biy of Biys/Prince of Princes, and had a good chance to learn the intricacies of traditional conflict resolution in Türkic society-->

From 1879 Aristov served as a permanent member and deputy chairman of a regional statistical committee. In 1881 he again was involved in the revision of the "Practice of governorship in the Turkestani Governing Generalship". In 1881 Aristov was appointed Semirechie military governor. In 1882 he was transferred to the Steppe Governing Generalship, and resigned the same year, after 24 years, 1 month and 6 days of active service, campaigns and battles. For his service Aristov was awarded 5 medals.

== Scientific work ==
In retirement Aristov lived in Saint Petersburg. He started his real research work only after his retirement. But before that, in Turkestani and central periodicals from time to time were published his articles on local subjects, in connection with his work as a Turkestani official. In line of work in 1871 he authored an applied science "Note about land division in Semirechie province" preserved in the archive of the Turkestani Governing Generalship.

The first publications of the young scientist appeared in 1873 in a statistics yearbook of the Turkestani territory illuminating "Kirgiz" (Russian colonial lingo at the time for Kazakh and Kirgiz people) agriculture and animal husbandry, their participation in the Uighur rebellion against China and in the East Turkestani events, and historical-geographical essay about Kipchaks.

Aristov was interested in geopolitics, the origin and ethnic structure of Türkic peoples. His work concentrated on the history of Kazakh and Kyrgyz people ("Kyrgyzes" in Aristov's published terminology) from the most ancient Usuns up to the end of the 19th century. Aristov set out on a lifelong venture to complement the works of the German classic of historical-geographical determinism K.Ritter and his followers P.P.Semenov-Tianshansky and V.V.Grigoriev in Russia. Aristov collected materials for "addition" to Ritter with example of Usuns - Kyrgyzes and Tien Shan history. In 1889 he published an article about Süan-Tszan ()travel across Western Turkestan 4, a preparatory research for his fundamental work. The author modestly saw his work only as addition to the K.Ritter "Physical geography of Asia", and saw his task only in "collecting all data and news available on history of the western Tien Shan and its population in the European scientific literature and in translations into European languages of the eastern sources".

Aristov completed his capital research work in 1893, but received a negative opinion from the censor N.I. Veselovsky that barred publication. Aristov continued to work on the history of the Türkic peoples, including Kazakhs/Kyrgyzes, and in 1894-96 published two large articles about ethnic history of Türks in a central Russian magazine "Olden time alive";.

In 1898-1900 he published articles and a book about bordering Afghani tribes, their struggle against British colonizers, and the Türkic situation in the Middle Asia. Probably, Aristov's last published work was published in 1903 treatise on the historical-ethnographic theme of Türkic tribes and their ancestors in the article about Pamir.

Aristov's publications sparked the lively interest and close attention of fellow scientists, but also jealous reactions, especially from Orientalists such as N.I. Veselovsky. Among Aristov's supporters were the ethnographer A.N.Kharuzin with his endorsement of Aristov's opinion about Usuns as ancestors of Kazakhs/Kyrgyzes and Usun city of Chigu on Lake Issyk Kul, the venerable Orientalist W.W.Bartold who called it the "work of a selfless researcher (who in addition does not belong to the officialdom of the science), written with full knowledge of the literature on the subject and obviously demanded several years of laborious work"

Aristov's ethnographic research was appreciated by the scientific community of Saint Petersburg. He was elected a full member of the Imperial Russian Geographical Society, and in 1895 was awarded a small gold medal in ethnographical science. The ethnographic research of Aristov became at once rare books, today the present an unsurpassed primary source.

== Sources ==
- Biographical and bibliographical information is based on the introductory section of the publication "N.Aristov, "Wusuns and Kyrgyz, or Kara-Kyrgyz", Bishkek, 2001"
