= Jäñgir-Kerei Khan =

Khan of the Bukey Horde (r. 1823–1845)

Jäñgır-Kerei Han جهانگیر کرای خان

Khan of the Bukey Horde
- Reign: 22 June 1823 – 11 August 1845
- Coronation: 26 June 1824
- Predecessor: Bökei (1815)
- Successor: Saiyp-Kerei Khan (designate, never fulfilled)
- Regent: Şiğai Khan (1815–1823)
- Born: 1801
- Died: 11 August 1845 (aged 43–44)
- Spouse: Fatima Khusainova (m. 1824–1845): Yuzum; Salikha
- Issue: 11, including Ibrahim, Gubaydullah, Ahmed, & Saiyp-Kerei Jangiruly
Names
- Jañgir-Kerei Khan; Kazakh: جهانگیر کرای خان
- Clan: Töre
- Father: Bökei
- Military career
- Allegiance: Russian Empire
- Branch: Imperial Russian Army
- Rank: Major general
- Conflicts: Isatay Taimanov's uprising

Jäñgır-Kerei Han (Kazakh: جهانگیر کرای خان, Cyrillic: Жәңгір-Керей хан, romanized: Jäñgir-Kerey xan; 1801 – 28 July [O.S. 11 August] 1845) was the penultimate Khan of the Bukey Horde, ruling from 1823 to 1845, and the final khan to be formally appointed. During his rule, he sought to establish the Horde as a modern state based on the model of the Russian Empire, and enacted a number of reforms. He remains popularly known for his efforts to bring formal education to the Horde, but is controversial for his promotion of feudalism over nomadism, leading to Isatay Taiman uly's uprising in 1836. In addition to his reign, he also worked as a pathologist, studying anthrax extensively, and an anthropologist, recording Kazakh national epics and weaponry.

== Early life ==
Jañgir-Kerei Khan was born in 1801 to Bökei, Khan of the Bukey Horde. He came from the Töre clan, a clan of direct descendants of Genghis Khan in the line of Jochi. From a young age, he displayed an interest in science, and was sent to live with Stepan Andreyevsky, governor of Astrakhan Governorate. Living with Andreyevsky, Jañgir-Kerei was educated in politics, administration, and other subjects. In addition to his native Kazakh, he was fluent in Russian, Persian, and Arabic. He additionally held fair knowledge of German and wrote in Chagatai. He realised the importance of education at a young age, expressing a desire to open a school in the Bukey Horde. At the time of Bökei's death, Jañgir-Kerei Khan was only 14 years old. Unable to rule the Horde, his uncle, Şiğai Khan, was instead designated as regent.

== Reign ==
On 22 June 1823, Jañgir-Kerei Khan was appointed as Khan by Tsar Alexander I, though his reign only actually began a year later with a formal ceremony conducted in Uralsk. A year after taking power, he married his first wife Fatima, the daughter of Kazakh chief mufti Muhammedjan Husainov. He attended the coronation of Tsar Nicholas I, where Fatima danced with the Tsar during a ball and made a significant impression on him. Subsequently, 25,000 rubles were allocated from the Russian treasury for the construction of a palace. Zhangir Khan made a grand tour of Europe.

In 1840, he was appointed to the rank of major general within the Imperial Russian Army.

=== Social and educational reforms ===
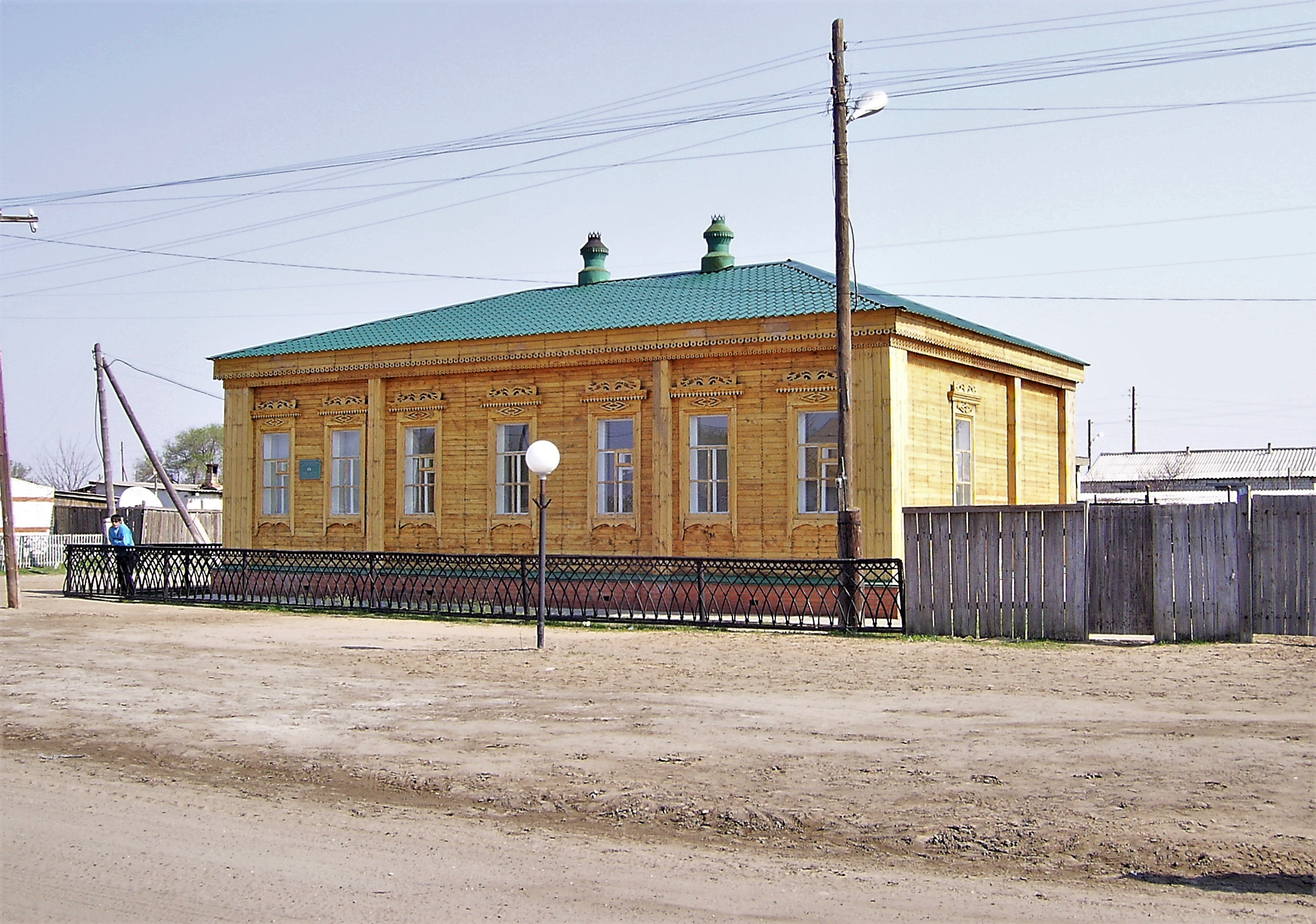
One of the first schools in the Horde, in the capital of Khan Ordasy

One of the main priorities of Jañgir-Kerei Khan was establishment of modern education in the Bukey Horde, with the assistance of Russia. In 1839, he requested that the Orenburg Governorate send a veterinarian to the Horde, in order to educate Kazakhs on modern animal husbandry techniques, as well as a midwife to assist with obstetrics. The khan established the first school in the Horde and served as its first teacher.

In addition to his educational reforms, the khan established a centralised government based on the Russian Empire, including a council of advisers, a group of beys, and an administrative office. The chiefs of the Horde were directly subordinated to the khan. He also introduced western medicine to the Horde, vaccinating his citizens and establishing the first pharmacy in the Horde in 1838, in addition to the Horde's first hospital.

=== Land reforms ===
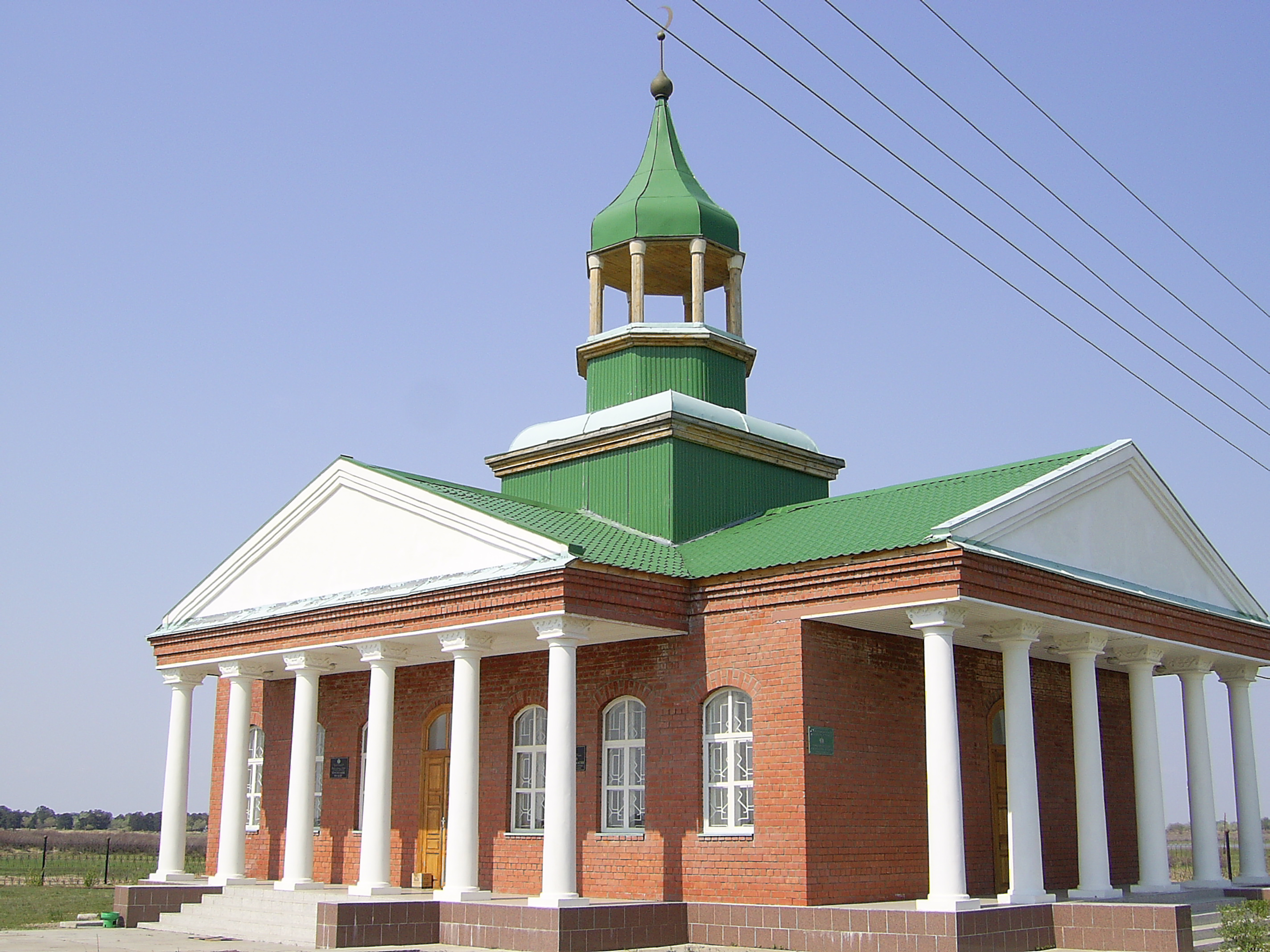
The mosque in Khan Ordasy. Jañgir-Kerei Khan established Khan Ordasy as the Horde's capital, making it one of the first ten settlements in the Horde

When Jañgir-Kerei Khan took power, the Kazakhs remained almost entirely nomadic, and the Horde had no permanent capital. Using the money provided by Russia, a capital was built in the modern-day village of Khan Ordasy beginning in late 1827. Though the capital was originally small, it later began to expand greatly following the 1832 trade fair, and was popularly referred to as the "Petersburg of the Steppe". A summer capital was also built in present-day Pallasovsky District, Russia. Ten permanent settlements were constructed in total during the khan's reign.

In an effort to encourage the settlement of his citizens and the end of nomadism, the khan undertook two actions. The first was enforcing requested taxes on Kazakh nomads whose livestock grazed in neighbouring lands owned by the Bagrationi, Yusupov, and Bezborodky families, in return for receiving a portion of the payments himself. The second action was privatising the lands within the Horde. Originally, only chiefs who had demonstrated their loyalty to the khan received land. However, this was soon followed by a system of selling off land to the wealthy, in an effort to move towards feudalism. Over a third of the Bukey Horde's population was left completely landless and forced into serfdom, and the Russian government further exacerbated problems by banning Kazakhs from settling along the coast of the Caspian Sea or along the banks of the Volga and Ural rivers.

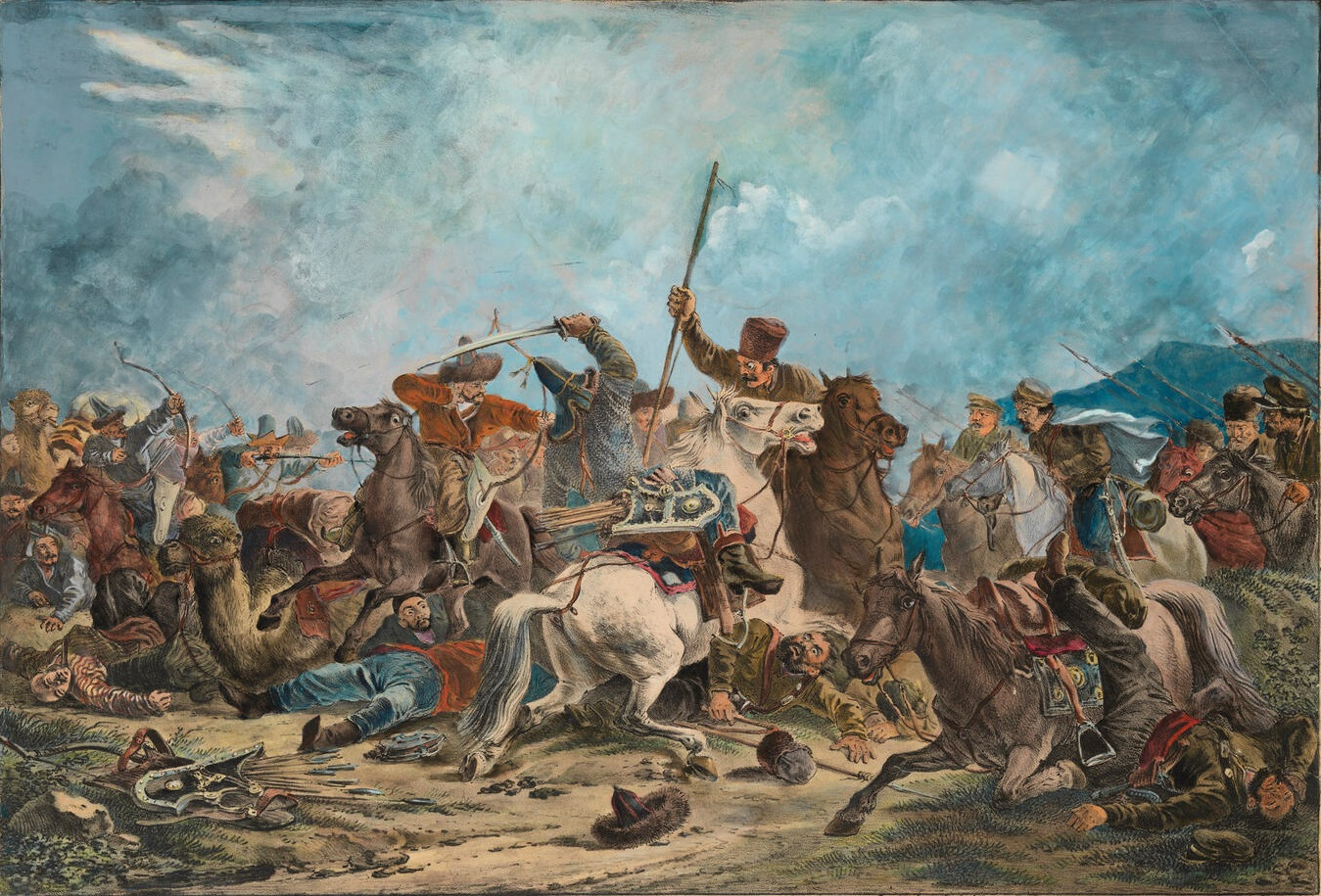
Russian assistance, not dissimilar from that depicted in Aleksander Orłowski's 1826 Battle of Cossacks and Kirghiz, was used to put down Isatay Taimanov's uprising in 1836

As a result of the khan's policy, the peasantry of the Bukey Horde rose up in 1836, under the leadership of Isatay Taymanuly and Makhambet Otemisuly. The khan responded to the uprising by requesting Russian assistance, which was obliged at the cost of increasing the Horde's dependence on the Russian government.

=== Economic reforms ===
Alongside his land and education reforms, Jañgir-Kerei Khan brought about a significant shift in the economy of the Bukey Horde. He established two taxes: zakat and a sogym tax on cattle. With the permission of the Orenburg Governorate, he held a trade fair in Khan Ordasy in 1832. As a result of the trade fair, economic interest in the Horde increased, and Khan Ordasy became a city of local economic importance. Trade became an important part of the Horde's economy, with citizens trading cattle for other goods from Volga Germans or herders in Russia proper.

== Scientific interests ==
In addition to his reign over the Bukey Horde, Jañgir-Kerei Khan was an accomplished pathologist, studying the effects of anthrax on the human body and publishing the monograph "On Anthrax". He exchanged letters with various European and Russian scientists of the time, including Alexander von Humboldt and Karl Fuchs, maintaining extensive contact with the latter from 1826 until the end of his life. He donated six manuscripts in Arabic, Persian, and Turkish to Kazan University, and additionally has been credited by the government of Kazakhstan with publishing the first written description of sharia on the territory of the Russian Empire, in 1844.

In addition to his donation of manuscripts and pathological work, the khan was a strong supporter of Kazakh anthropology. He wrote down Kazakh national epics and, with the cooperation of his family and other Borjigin relatives, secured enough ancient Mongol weaponry, as well as armour, firearms, and hunting equipment for the establishment of a museum known as "the Armoury" in Khan Ordasy. The House of Romanov additionally donated some of their sabres which had been granted by Kazakh rulers. It is the first museum known to have been established in modern-day Kazakhstan, and its value between the weaponry, armour, and hunting equipment was valued at 8,015.75 rubles by the Orenburg Border Commission following the khan's death.

== Death ==
Jañgir-Kerei Khan died on 11 August 1845, officially from a stroke, though this narrative has been questioned by historians. According to opponents of the official explanation, the khan was murdered. Two differing theories have emerged to contest the official version of his death. The first states that he was assassinated by his barber, possibly on the orders of Nicholas I. The second theory claims that the khan was poisoned, citing the fact that he remained physically active and healthy until his death.

== Legacy ==
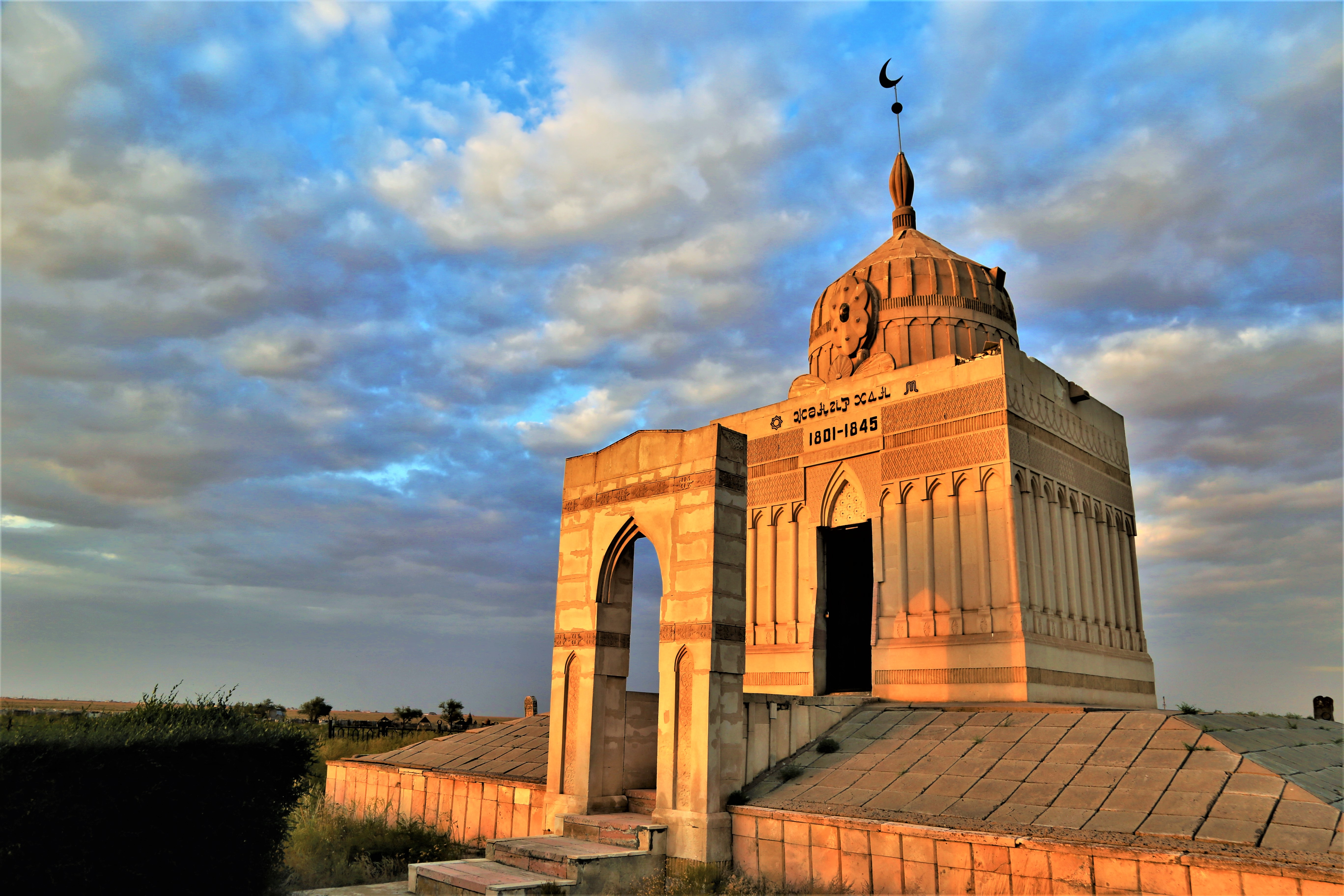
Jañgir-Kerei Khan's mausoleum in Khan Ordasy

Historiography in the Soviet Union historically treated Jañgir-Kerei Khan as a negative figure due to his promotion of feudalism and his role in the 1836 uprising. Since Kazakh independence, a more nuanced position has developed among historians. His efforts led to a significant effect on the development of education in Kazakhstan, and he has been credited by history professor Indira Akylbayeva with pushing Ybyrai Altynsarin to pursue a career as an educator. The West Kazakhstan Agrarian-Technical University has been named after Jañgir-Kerei Khan since May 2003.
