= Makhambet Otemisuly =

Kazakh poet and political figure

Otemisuly, Makhambet
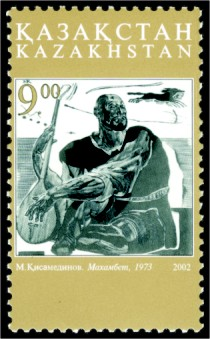
- 2002 Kazakhstan stamp commemorating Makhambet
- Born: 1804
- Died: October 20, 1846
- Occupation: Poet

Makhambet Otemisuly (Kazakh: Махамбет Өтемісұлы Мұхамед Өтемісұлы, Muhammed Ötemisuly Mahambet Ötemısūly; 1804 – October 20, 1846) was a Kazakh poet, composer and political figure. He is best known for his activity as a leader (with friend Isatay Taymanuly) of rebellions against Russian colonialism. This activity is believed to have resulted in his murder in 1846. His first rebellions took place against Zhangir-Kerey Khan of the Bukey Horde. Because the rebellion was badly defeated and a bounty was placed on Otemisuly, he had to flee the region.

Makhambet's early education took place at a Russian language school in Orenburg. However, his poetry was more closely tied to Kazakh culture and literary tradition. The major themes of his poetry were of two types: political criticism of Russia or the khan, or more general poetry devoted to themes about human existence and life.

== Biography ==
- From 1824 to 1828, Makhambet stayed with Zulkarnaiyn, the son of Jangir-Kerey Khan, in the city of Orenburg.
- In 1829, Makhambet was arrested on charges of secretly crossing the Ural River into the Inner Horde and was imprisoned in Kalmykov's prison for nearly two years.
- In 1831, he escaped from prison but was later acquitted.
- In 1834, he joined forces with Isatay Batyr. On June 9 of that year, Jangir Khan offered Makhambet the position of starshina (leader) in an attempt to win him over. Issues such as land disputes, the scarcity of pastures, the actions of the Russian Empire aimed at destroying the Kazakh Khanate, as well as Jangir Khan's favoritism towards his relatives and the dominance of his father-in-law Karauylkhozha in governance, led to widespread unrest. The conflict between Karauylkhozha and Isatay-Makhambet escalated into a significant movement. Makhambet's poem "Ey, Makhambet, My Comrade!" written on behalf of Isatay, and the lines "The son of the Khan cried, asked me to spare his life" describe the truth of the days when they besieged the Khan's horde (1837).
- In November 1837, the rebels fought against Geke's troops in the Beketai sands but were defeated. These events are depicted in Makhambet's poem "War," and the sorrowful state of defeat is expressed in the works "Jabigu" and "Ereuil Atka Er Salmai."
- On March 17, 1836, Jangir Khan ordered the arrest of Makhambet, Isatay, and their comrades. Karauylkhozha Babazhanov was entrusted with this task.
- On April 4, 1836, near a place called Kieli Mola, Karauylkhozha's detachment of 522 men encountered Isatay-Makhambet's force of about 200 men. Karauylkhozha, unable to muster the courage to initiate a battle, retreated.
- In May 1836, Karauylkhozha filed a complaint with the Orenburg Border Commission, accusing Makhambet of killing Kushik Zhaparuly.
- In June 1836, Isatay and Makhambet presented their demands to the Khan's horde. In the same year, Jangir Khan sent a letter to the Orenburg Border Commission requesting the arrest of Isatay and Makhambet.
- On February 17, 1837, Isatay and Makhambet attacked Karauylkhozha's village.
- In March 1837, Jangir filed a complaint with Ataman Pokatilov, accusing Isatay and Makhambet of being "thieves" and demanding their immediate arrest.
- In the autumn of 1837, Isatay and Makhambet, with more than 2,000 soldiers, surrounded the Khan's horde. In November 1837, they were defeated by Geke's troops in the Beketai sands.
- From 1837 to 1838, they crossed the Ural River and remained among the Kishi Zhuz (Small Horde). They focused on gathering forces and inciting the people to revolt.
- On July 12, 1838, during the battle at Akbulak, Isatay was killed, and Makhambet spent about two years trying to gather forces in the Khiva region. When this effort failed, he secretly returned to the Bukey Horde and sought refuge among the people. These were difficult and turbulent years in the poet's life.
- On March 4, 1841, Makhambet was captured while staying in the home of a Kazakh named Tilekeev, based on information provided by unidentified individuals. A detachment of 40,000 men from the Ural military arrested Makhambet and his host, keeping them in Kalmykov village (nowadays Tairak district) for two weeks before sending them to Orenburg (March 17, 1841). The Orenburg Governor-General referred Makhambet's case to a military court.
- On July 7, 1841, the court ordered his release with a stern warning not to cross the border again, stating that he would face severe punishment if he engaged in further 'disturbances.'
- There are few records of Makhambet's life between 1841 and 1845.
- In February 1846, Makhambet came to Orenburg with the intention of enrolling his son Nursultan in school. Due to his border crossing, the Governor-General reopened the case, and B. Aishuakov, the administrator of the western part of the Kishi Zhuz, continued to pursue Makhambet. He placed a bounty of 1,000 rubles on the poet's head and sent a special detachment (consisting of the cornet Ikhlas Toleiuly, the bi of the Berish tribe Zhanabergen Bozdakuly, Taban Torezhan Turymuly, and the Berish tribe's Musanuraly, Jusip Oteuly) to capture him. Makhambet was killed by the hand of cornet Turymuly.

== Bibliography ==
Ereuwil atqa er salmay: Olengder, edited by Qabibolla Sydyzov. Almaty, Kazakhstan: Zhazuushy. 1989

== Sources ==
- Encyclopedic Biography of Makhambet Otemisuly
- Kazakhstan Pravda Discussion on Makhambet's possible birthdates
