= Alaşa =

- Municipality
- Location within Azerbaijan
- Coordinates: 38°27′N 48°48′E
- Country: Azerbaijan
- Rayon: Astara

Population
  - Total: 396
- Time zone: UTC+4 (AZT)

Alaşa (also, Alasha and Alashakend) is a village and municipality in the Astara Rayon of Azerbaijan. It has a population of 396.
