= Bukey Horde =

1801–1849 Kazakh khanate

Bukey Horde Бөкей Ордасы (Kazakh) Букеевская Орда (Russian)
- 1801–1849
- Capital: Khan Ordasy
- Common languages: Kazakh language, Russian language
- Religion: Sunni Islam
- Government: Absolute monarchy
- Khan
  - 1801–1815: Bukey Khan
  - 1823–1845: Jäñgir-Kerei Khan (last)
- History
  - Established: 1801
  - Disestablished: 1849
Preceded by	Succeeded by
Kalmyk Khanate; Russian Empire	Russian Empire; Bukey Governate

The Bukey Horde (Kazakh: Бөкей Ордасы, romanized: Bökei Ordasy, بوكەي ورداسى; Russian: Букеевская Орда, romanized: Bukeyevskaya Orda), also known as the Inner Horde or Interior Horde, was an autonomous khanate of Kazakhs located north of the Caspian Sea in between the Ural and Volga Rivers. The khanate officially existed from 1801 to 1845, when the position of khan was abolished and the area was fully absorbed into the administration of the Russian Empire. It was located in the western part of modern-day Kazakhstan. Its lands were spread over about 71,000 square kilometers.

== History ==
=== Background ===
The population consisted primarily of 5,000 families of the Junior Zhuz. In the mid-19th century, the population grew to 200,000 people.

It was named after Sultan Bokei Nuralyuly.

In 1756 the Russians attempted to ban the Kazakhs from crossing the Ural River, partly to help the Bashkirs. This was difficult to enforce, given Russia's limited resources in the area. There were numerous illegal crossings and conflicts with the Ural Cossacks. In 1771, following the Kalmyck exodus to Dzungaria, the area became depopulated. The Russians attempted to confine the remaining Kalmyks west of the Volga. From 1782 the Russians permitted Nur Ali and his family, and later some other groups, to cross the Ural legally. In 1801, Russia allowed Nur Ali's son Sultan Bukey, along with some 7,500 families from the Junior Zhuz to reside permanently in the "Inner Side", as the western side of the Ural was known. After the death of Bukey Sultan, Shygai Khan became the new Khan from 1819 to 1823, followed by Jäñgir Khan from 1823 to 1845.

=== Jäñgir Khan's reforms ===
Jäñgir, who had adopted some of the habits and tastes of the Russian nobility, was literate and educated, and upon becoming the Khan of the Bukey Horde, immediately initiated reforms.

By letter of Alexander I in 1823, Jäñgir was recognized as the Khan of the Bukey Horde. In 1824, a ceremony was held to raise him to that rank. By 1827, reform of the bureaucracy began—the Khan's Council was created, in which each large clan was elected by foreman. In the 1820s–1830s he campaigned to centralize his power and create power structures. The power of the sultans was limited; now they were directly elected by the khan. By the end of his reign, almost all the sultans were elected by Jäñger himself. He personally appointed foremen of the heads of departments at their birth, and determined the powers of elders and sultans to maintain order, collect taxes and promote trade.

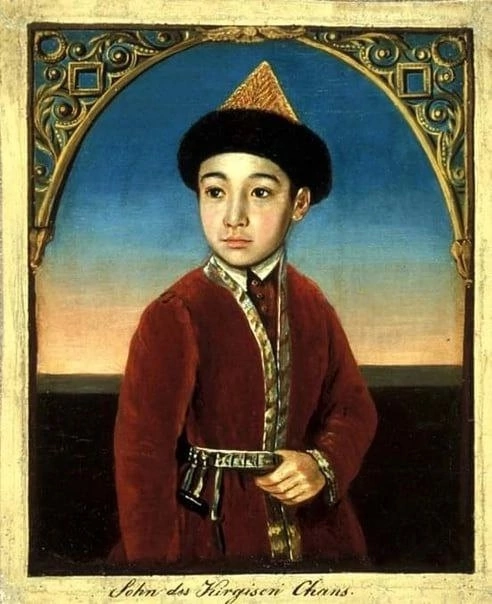
Painting signed "Son of the Kazakh Khan (Russians used to call Kazakhs as Kirghiz or Kirghiz-Kaisaks", 1844. Stored at the Museum of European Culture in Berlin, Germany

Under Jäñger, a system of so-called "esauls" was organized—people entrusting special assignments—and "bazar sultans" to control trade. He created a special office with two departments: Tatar and Russian. The first was intended for internal affairs, and the other for relations with the Russian authorities.

The transition to a sedentary lifestyle was encouraged: farming, mowing, forestry, import of agricultural implements, and the development of local breeds of livestock. The Khan himself formed the first permanent settlements on the territory of the Horde: in 1827 he founded the settlement of Khan-Kala (Khanskaya Stavka), and in 1841 the summer headquarters of Tor-gun-Kala. The khanate supported barter and entrepreneurship. From 1833, a large annual fair was held at the Khanskaya Stavka, in which Russian merchants also participated. This promoted economic ties between the Kazakhs of the Bukey Horde and other European regions of Russia.

Jäñgir allocated significant funds to reform of education in the Horde; in 1841, he opened a secular general education school for Kazakh children in the Khanskaya Stavka. At the same time, Islam actively developed in the Khanate; he built mektebs in the villages, and madrasahs in the Khan's Headquarters.

The best pasture lands Jäñgir distributed to the families of Kazakh nobility, which caused great discontent throughout the Bukey Horde.

From 1836 to 1838, Isatay Taymanuly and famous akyn Makhambet Otemisuly led an uprising against the rule of Jäñgir Khan occurred in the region. The rebellion was eventually suppressed.

In 1845, following the death of Jäñgir Khan, the position of khan was abolished and the area gradually came under Russian civil administration.

== See also ==
- Turkic peoples
- Kazakh khanate
- Kazakhstan in the Russian Empire
- List of Kazakh khans
