= Taiyr Khan =

16th century Khan of the Khazakh Khanate

Tahir Khan طاهر خان Тахир хан
- Khan; Khanzada; Sultan

6th Khan of the Kazakh Khanate
- Reign: 1523–1533
- Coronation: 1523
- Predecessor: Muhammed Khan
- Successor: Ahmed Khan
- Born: Unknown; Kazakh Khanate
- Died: 1533; Kazakh Khanate
- Spouse: Gulbahram Begum
Names
- طاهر علی عبد الله خان; Tāhir Ali Abdūllah Khan
- House: House of Borjigin
- Dynasty: Tore, House of Urus Khan
- Father: Adik Sultan
- Religion: Sunni Islam

Tāhir Ali Abdūllah Khan (Kazakh: طاهر علی عبدالله, Тахир Әли Абдұллаh Хан, romanized: Tahir Äli Abdūllah Han), also known by his regal name as Tahir (Taiyr) Khan was the sixth Khan of the Kazakh Khanate from 1523 to 1533. His rule led to the fall of the Kazakh Khanate's dominance since the reign of Qasim Khan.

== Biography ==
=== Early years ===
Tahir was the nephew of Kasym Khan and the eldest son of Adik Sultan. Adik was the most influential Kazakh sultan and the eldest son of Janibek Khan, the co-founder of the Kazakh Khanate. Tahir Khan ascended to the throne after a short reign and the death of his cousin Muhammed Khan.

Tahir (or Taiyr, a variation of his name) was happy and easygoing. He, as a descendant of Genghis Khan, by birthright acquired the title of Sultan and with him as well as all the rights and benefits. Like most young sultans of the Khanate, Tahir studied at a royal school under a mullah in Tashkent, where his parents lived for a long time. But he always differed himself from others with a difficult personality. According to the personal accounts of Mirza Hayder, a Kazakh noble who knew Tahir well, the infighting among the nobles in his empire had turned the young prince into an evil, cruel person and extremely suspicious individual who sought absolute power at the top of his country.

=== Reign ===
With the death of Muhammed Khan in 1523, the era of consolidation ended and the era of "great sharing" began. This involved almost all subordinate Kazakh nobles (commonly known in their society as "sultans") sharing the powers of the khan and dividing up pastures between themselves and ordinary residents of the khanate. Tahir was accompanied by luck, and in a sharp rivalry with the sultans from other families he gained the upper hand and became a Khan. In 1522–1523, the ruler of Khanate of Bukhara, Kochkunju Muhammad, fought a war against the Kazakhs and won. Everything that Tahir Khan did for himself was difficult and all his promises were unsuccessful. He had neither diplomatic nor military skills, as evidenced by his repeated military defeats and diplomatic setbacks. Tyrant by nature, Tahir became a culprit after the death of his brother Abu’l-Qasim Khan. Not only that, Tahir expressed himself to natural impulses and continued to live casually. These outcomes began immediately affecting him. Even in the winter of 1523–1524, part of the Kazakhs had already begun to disobey him. By the middle of 1526, Tahir Khan's activities became very insufficient, and his cruelty and suspicion had severed. As a result, even the enlightened sultans turned away from him. Tahir Khan was one of the first Kazakh rulers to enter a war with the Kalmyks. He ordered the construction of the Jatan fortress at the bottom of one mountain in order to repulse the Kalmyk troops. In 1537–1538, when the Khan of the Moghuls, Abd al-Rashid, who was allied with Shaybanids went to war against the Kazakh Khanate, the Kazakhs managed to defended themselves in the fortress. The exact location of where the Jatan fort once stood is currently unknown. In his final years, Tahir, who had failed at the same time as in anticipation, provoking general hatred by his government, hid himself from other people and died with the Kyrgyzs in misery.

Preceded by Mamash Khan	Khan of the Kazakhs; 1523–1533	Succeeded by Ahmet Khan
