= Mamash Khan =

Khan of the Kazakh Khanate

Muhammed (Mamash) Khan محمد (ماماش) خان Мұхаммед (Мамаш) хан
- Khan; Khanzada; Sultan

5th Khan of the Kazakh Khanate
- Reign: 1521–1523
- Coronation: 1521
- Predecessor: Qasim Khan
- Successor: Tahir Khan
- Born: 1480; Kazakh Khanate
- Died: 1523 (aged 42–43); Kazakh Khanate
- Spouse: Ibadat Begum
Names
- محمد بن قاسم خان; Mūhammed bin Qasım Khan
- House: House of Borjigin
- Dynasty: Tore, House of Urus Khan
- Father: Qasim Khan
- Mother: Khanyk Sultan Begum
- Religion: Sunni Islam

Mūhammed bin Qasim Khan (Kazakh: محمد بن قاسم خان, Мұхаммед бин Қасым хан, romanized: Mūhammed bin Qasım Han), also known by his diminutive nickname Mamash Khan, was the oldest son of Qasim Khan. Following the death of his father, he became the fifth Khan of the Kazakh Khanate and ruled from about 1521 to 1523.

== Biography ==
Khanzada Muhammed was born to Qasim Khan and his wife Khanyk-Sultan Begum. He was the oldest of three sons born to Qasim, along with his brothers Haqnazar Khan and Abu'l Khair Sultan. Muhammed earned the nickname "Mamash" in his teenage years and went by that name for the rest of his life.

Muhammed (referred to as Mamash hereafter) became the fifth Khan of the Kazakh Khanate after the death of his father Kasym Khan in the winter of 1521. Under his rule, Mamash could not resist against the Nogai Horde, which captured the territory to the Turgai River. The Kazakh Khanate was greatly reduced for a brief period, but Mamash was able to recapture the western lands as far as modern-day Atyrau from the Nogai Horde. Nevertheless, he still faced competition for his territory from the Russians up north, where the Tsars of Russia considered the lands as theirs to take. Ivan the Terrible repeatedly sent his ambassadors to Mamash to obtain a peaceful submission. While it did end in battle, the Kazakhs were still able to defend their northern borders from the Russians.

The reign of Mamash Khan was short-lived; rivalry between the nobles weakened the state. In 1523, Mamash died in an internal conflict due to suffocation and injuries caused by weapons. Khanzada Tahir, the son of Adik Sultan and nephew of Kasym Khan, ascended the throne after him.

Preceded by Kasym Khan	Khan of the Kazakhs; 1521–1523	Succeeded by Taiyr Khan
