= Isatay Taymanuly =

Kazakh batyr and rebel leader

Isatay Taymanuly (Kazakh: Исатай Тайманұлы, Isatai Taimanūly; Russian: Исатай Тайманов, romanized: Isatay Taymanov; 1791 – July 12, 1838) was a Kazakh hero (батыр "batır") and leader (with his friend Makhambet Utemisuly) of a rebellion against Zhangir-Kerey Khan of Bukey Horde and the Russian rulers of Kazakhstan in the 19th century.

The rebellion began in late 1836 and the beginning of 1837 against the rule of Jäñgir-Kerei Khan and the Russian Empire. Alongside the Kazakh poet and revolutionary Makhambet Otemisulyhe led a popular revolt driven by grievances over land distribution, administrative abuses and the political and economic subordination of the Kazakh population. Following the defeat of the insurgents at Tas-Tyube in November 1837, Taimanuly continued his resistance in the Junior Zhuz. He was killed in battle against Russian imperial forces near the Aqbulak River on 12 July 1838. He is remembered in Kazakhstan as a national liberation figure and one of the prominent leaders of nineteenth-century Kazakh resistance to imperial rule.

Isatay was killed in fighting near the Aqbulaq River on July 12, 1838. According to Baymirza Hayit's book "Turkistan: Between Russia and China" after his army was defeated, Isatay Batir got into a sword fight against seven Russian Cossack soldiers; eventually he got overwhelmed and was killed by decapitation.
