= Vohidov =

Vohidov is a surname. Notable people with the surname include:

- Abdumuqit Vohidov, Tajikistani Guantanomo detainee
- Asror Vohidov (born 1995), Tajikistani boxer
- Erkin Vohidov (1936–2016), Uzbek poet, playwright, translator, and statesman
- Vosit Vohidov (1917–1994), Uzbek-Soviet surgeon
