= List of Tajikistani detainees at Guantanamo Bay =

On May 15, 2006, the United States Department of Defense acknowledged that there have been 12 Tajik detainees held in Guantanamo. The Guantanamo Bay detainment camps were opened on January 11, 2002, at the Guantanamo Bay Naval Base, in Cuba.

== Press reports ==
In 2006, the magazine Mother Jones published a feature article titled "The Man Who Has Been to America: One Guantanamo detainee's story". The article was based on an interview with Muhibullo Abdulkarim Umarov, a Tajik from a village named Alisurkhon. Umarov said that he and a neighbor from his village were captured while visiting a third neighbor at his university in Pakistan. Umarov named his two neighbors, Mazharudin and Abdughaffor. He said they too had been sent to Guantanamo. Mazharudin is named on the official list, but Abdughaffor is not. Umarov told Mother Jones that Mazharudin and Abdughaffor were released on March 31, 2004, at the same time he was.

The US Department of Defense (DoD) acknowledged holding twelve Tajiks in Guantanamo. The DoD acknowledged convening Combatant Status Review Tribunals for six of the Tajiks, a process followed for every detainee who was still in Guantanamo in 2005.

On March 1, 2007, a press release announced that the DoD had returned three Tajiks back to Tajikistan.

On August 7, 2007, Radio Free Europe reported that a former Tajik detainee, Mukit Vohidov, had been repatriated from Guantanamo to Tajikistani custody, in March 2007, and was about to stand trial. The report also stated that another former Tajik detainee, Ibrohim Nasriddinov, had recently stood trial, been convicted, and received a 23-year sentence.

== List of Tajiks held in Guantanamo ==
ISN	Name	Date of birth	Arrival date	Departure date	Notes
00076	Rukniddin Sharipov	1973-03-15	2002-01-15	2007-02-28	Repatriated in March 2007.; Put on trial on August 7, 2007.; Convicted of being a mercenary on August 18, 2007, and sentenced to 17 years in prison.; Carol Rosenberg, writing in the Miami Herald, reported that Umar Abdulayev had said that he, Sharipov, and one other Tajik were threatened by Tajikistani security officials, who told them they would be punished if they did not agree to pretend to be militant jihadists, and spy on real Tajikistani militant jihadists.
00077	Mehrabanb Fazrollah	1962-10-18	2002-02-09	2007-02-28	
00083	Yusef Nabied	1963-08-05	2002-02-08	2004-07-17	Repatriated on July 17, 2004, two weeks before the first Combatant Status Review Tribunal were convened.
00090	Abdumukite Vokhidov	1969-11-13	2002-01-15	2007-02-28	
00208	Maroof Saleemovich Salehove	1978-03-03	2002-01-20	2005-08-19	Repatriated on August 19, 2005.; His Combatant Status Review Tribunal determined he was not an enemy combatant.
00257	Omar Hamzayavich Abdulayev	1978-10-11	2002-02-09	2016-07-10	In November 2009 Abdulayev was the last Tajikistani in Guantanamo.; Abdulayev reported that visiting Tajikistani security officials threatened him and two other captives with retribution if they did not agree to pretend to be militant jihadists in order to spy on real militant jihadists, once they were repatriated.
00641	Abdul Karim Irgashive	1965-05-07	2002-06-08	2004-07-17	Repatriated on July 17, 2004, two weeks before the first Combatant Status Review Tribunal were convened.
00665	Sadee Eideov	1953	2002-06-14	2004-03-31	Repatriated on March 31, 2004, approximately four months before the first Combatant Status Review Tribunal were convened.
00729	Muhibullo Abdulkarim Umarov	1980-10-06	2002-08-05	2004-03-31	
00731	Mazharudin	1979-12-01	2002-08-05	2004-03-31	
00732	Shirinov Ghafar Homarovich	1974-01-09	2002-08-05	2004-03-31	
01095	Zainulabidin Merozhev	1978	unknown	2008-10-31	
