= Mansur Ahmad Saad al-Dayfi =

Former Guantanamo Bay detainee

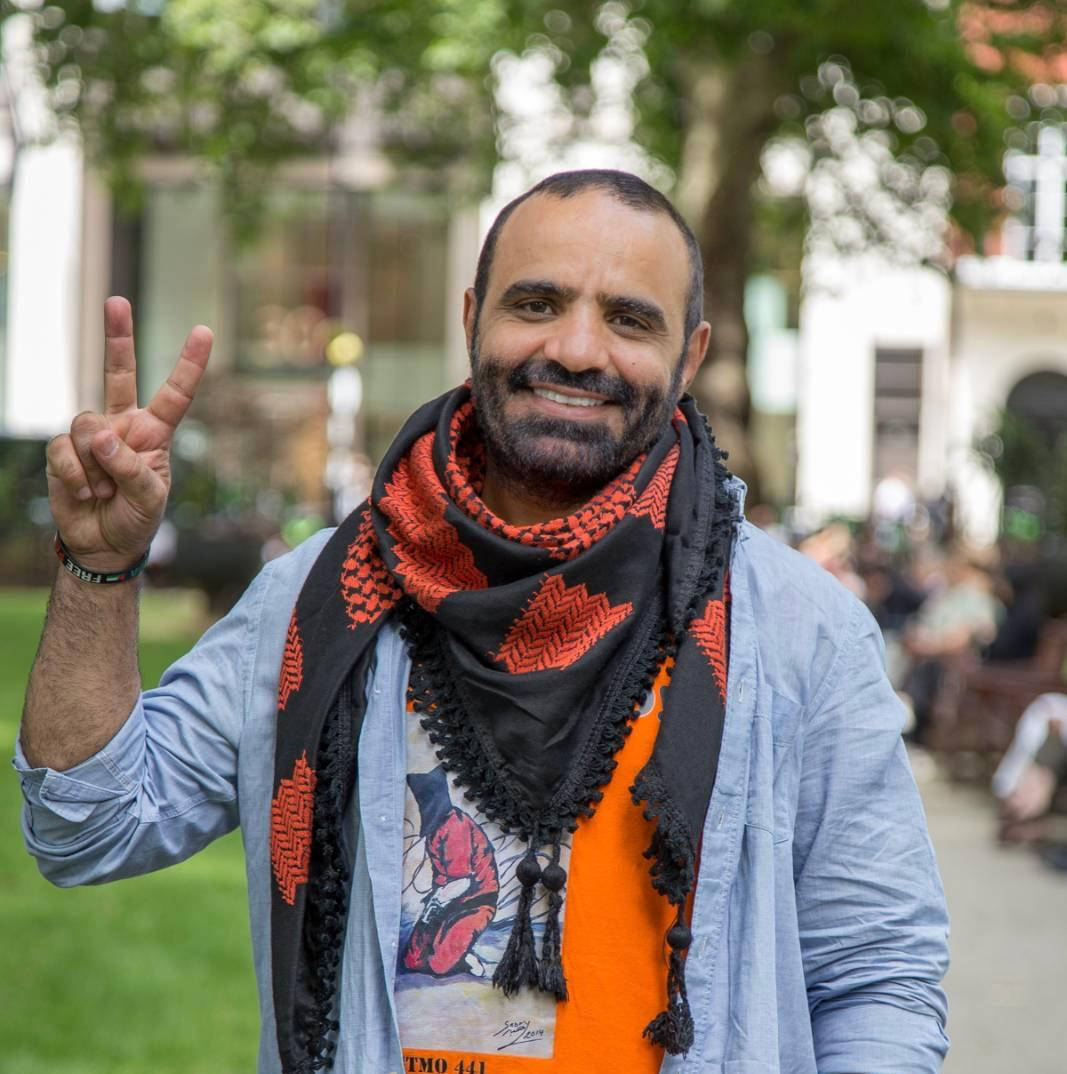
- Born: 1979 (age 46–47); Sanaa, North Yemen
- Released: July 11, 2016; Serbia
- Detained at: Guantanamo
- ISN: 441
- Charge(s): None; extrajudicial detention
- Status: Released
- Notable work: Don't Forget Us Here

Mansur Ahmad Saad al-Dayfi (Arabic: منصور أحمد سعد الضيفي; born 1979) is a Yemeni who was held without charge in the United States Guantanamo Bay detention camps in Cuba from February 9, 2002, to July 11, 2016. On July 11, 2016, he and a Tajikistani captive were transferred to Serbia. His Guantanamo Internment Serial Number was 441.

According to a US government report, before his capture he "probably was a low-level fighter who was aligned with al-Qa'ida, although it is unclear whether he actually joined that group", and "traveled to Afghanistan in mid-2001, trained at an al-Qa'ida camp, [was] wounded by a coalition airstrike after the 9/11 attacks", and was captured by Afghan forces in late 2001.

Al-Dayfi came to prominence in 2022 when he alleged that Florida governor Ron DeSantis oversaw beatings and force-feedings of detainees at Guantanamo.

== Official status reviews ==
Originally the Bush Presidency asserted that captives apprehended in the "war on terror" were not covered by the Geneva Conventions, and could be held indefinitely, without charge, and without an open and transparent review of the justifications for their detention. In 2004, the United States Supreme Court ruled, in Rasul v. Bush, that Guantanamo captives were entitled to being informed of the allegations justifying their detention, and were entitled to try to refute them.

=== Office for the Administrative Review of Detained Enemy Combatants ===
Combatant Status Review Tribunals were held in a 3x5 meter trailer where the captive sat with his hands and feet shackled to a bolt in the floor.

Following the Supreme Court's ruling the Department of Defense set up the Office for the Administrative Review of Detained Enemy Combatants.

Scholars at the Brookings Institution, led by Benjamin Wittes, listed the captives still held in Guantanamo in December 2008, according to whether their detention was justified by certain common allegations:

=== Formerly secret Joint Task Force Guantanamo assessment ===
Al-Dayfi's thirteen-page Joint Task Force Guantanamo assessment was drafted on June 9, 2008. It was signed by camp commandant Rear Admiral David M. Thomas Jr., who recommended continued detention.

== Transfer to Serbia ==
Al-Dayfi was transferred to Serbia, which al-Dayfi describes as "Guantanamo 2.0". He was transferred together with an individual from Tajikistan named "Muhammadi Davlatov".

== PBS Frontline profile ==
On February 21, 2017, al-Dayfi was profiled in an episode of the PBS network's Frontline series. His habeas attorney, Beth Jacob, described how al-Dayfi was offered either Serbia or continued detention.

Jacob said that neither Serbia nor the US had provided him with any language training, or other support to help him adapt to civilian life, or adjust to living in a foreign culture, or help him find employment, and that he had started a hunger strike in consequence.

Al-Dayfi learned English in Guantanamo.

When Frontline visited al-Dayfi, his weight had dropped 18 pounds in 21 days. In Guantanamo, he had been continuously force-fed for over two years.

Frontline producers were intercepted by security officials.

During the course of their research al-Dayfi disappeared. Serbian security officials interfered with their access to him.

== Art from Guantanamo ==
On September 15, 2017, the New York Times published an account al-Dayfi had written of how desperate the Guantanamo captives were to see the sea, and how an approaching hurricane, in 2014, finally gave them a view. The fences surrounding the camp had opaque screens hung from them. The screens were removed when the hurricane approached, to prevent the fences being blown away.

In 2021 he published Don't Forget Us Here: Lost and Found at Guantanamo, a memoir written in collaboration with Antonio Aiello and based on manuscripts he wrote while detained.

== Open letter to President Biden ==
On January 29, 2021 the New York Review of Books published an open letter from al-Dayfi and six other individuals who were formerly held in Guantanamo to newly inaugurated US president Joe Biden, appealing to him to close the detention camp.

== Allegations regarding Ron DeSantis ==
In a November 2022 interview, al-Dayfi stated that current Florida governor Ron DeSantis, during his time as a JAG lawyer at Guantanamo Bay detention camp, oversaw beatings and force-feedings of detainees.

== 2025 Prisoners for Palestine Hunger Strike ==
In December 2025, Al-Dayfi began a hunger strike in solidarity with the hunger strikers in the UK as part of the Prisoners for Palestine Hunger Strike.
