= Abdumuqit Vohidov =

Tajik former Guantanamo Bay detainee

- Citizenship: Tajikistan
- Detained at: Guantanamo
- ISN: 90
- Charge: Extrajudicial detention
- Status: Released to Tajikistan

Abdumuqit Vohidov is a citizen of Tajikistan who was held in extrajudicial detention, for five years, in the United States' Guantanamo Bay detention camps, in Cuba. His Guantanamo Internment Serial Number was 90. Vohidov was returned to his native Tajikistan on 28 February 2007.

== Imprisoned by the Taliban ==
Vohidov was one of nine former Taliban prisoners the Associated Press pointed out had gone from Taliban custody to American custody.

The Taliban had accused Vohidov of spying for Russia, and imprisoned him for nearly three years. At Kandahar Airfield, he complained to Cpt. Danner that he had been housed in a more humane prison by the Taliban, where he had been given a radio, fresh fruit and proper toilet facilities.

== Trial in Tajikistan ==
Vohidov and Rukniddin Sharipov were to stand trial in Tajikistan. They were charged with

- illegally crossing the Tajik border into Afghanistan in early 2001;
- joining fighters of the Islamic Movement of Uzbekistan.

Vohidov and Sharopov received sentences of 17 years on 18 August 2007. The two men were convicted of serving as mercenaries.

Carol Rosenberg, writing in the Miami Herald on 7 July 2009, reported that Umar Abdulayev, the sole remaining Tajikistani, reported that a delegation of Tajikistani security officials threatened to retaliate against him Sharipov and Vohidov, unless they agreed to pretend to be militant jihadists, and report on real militant jihadists, following their repatriations.

== McClatchy interview ==
On 15 June 2008, the McClatchy News Service published articles based on interviews with 66 former Guantanamo captives. McClatchy reporters interviewed Airat Vakhitov by telephone. Vohidov told his interviewers he was suffering ongoing mental problems, and that he was worried that if interviewers visited him in person he would be punished by Russian security officials.

Vohidov had been an imam in Tatarstan, who was imprisoned following a general round-up when Russian officials were cracking down on Chechens. He was temporarily freed, and fled Russia when he learned that security officials were looking for him. He said he was kidnapped by the forces of the Islamic Movement of Uzbekistan, and eventually transported to Afghanistan, against his will.

== 2012 elections ==
Bridget McCormack, a candidate for a seat on the Michigan Supreme Court, helped defend Vohitov, and in 2012, the Judicial Crisis Network broadcast an advertisement which criticized her for "freeing a terrorist." Andrew Rosenthal, of The New York Times criticized the Judicial Crisis Network ad, which contained footage of Teri Johnson, the mother of Joseph Johnson, a GI who was killed in Afghanistan, who says:

“My son is a hero and fought to protect us. ... Bridget McCormack volunteered to help free a terrorist. How could you?”

Rosenthal pointed out that Vohitov was freed through the non-judicial review, through the Office for the Administrative Review of Detained Enemy Combatants in 2007.

== Reports Vohidov volunteered in Iraq or Syria ==
In 2016, reports emerged that Vohidov had volunteered to fight in Iraq.

== John Kerry classes Vohidov a terrorist ==
On 29 June 2016, Secretary of State John Kerry, citing Executive Order 13224, classed Vohidov as a Specially Designated Global Terrorist.

== See also ==
- Tajikistani detainees at Guantanamo Bay
