= Mausoleum of Khoja Ahmed Yasawi =

Historic site in Turkestan, Kazakhstan

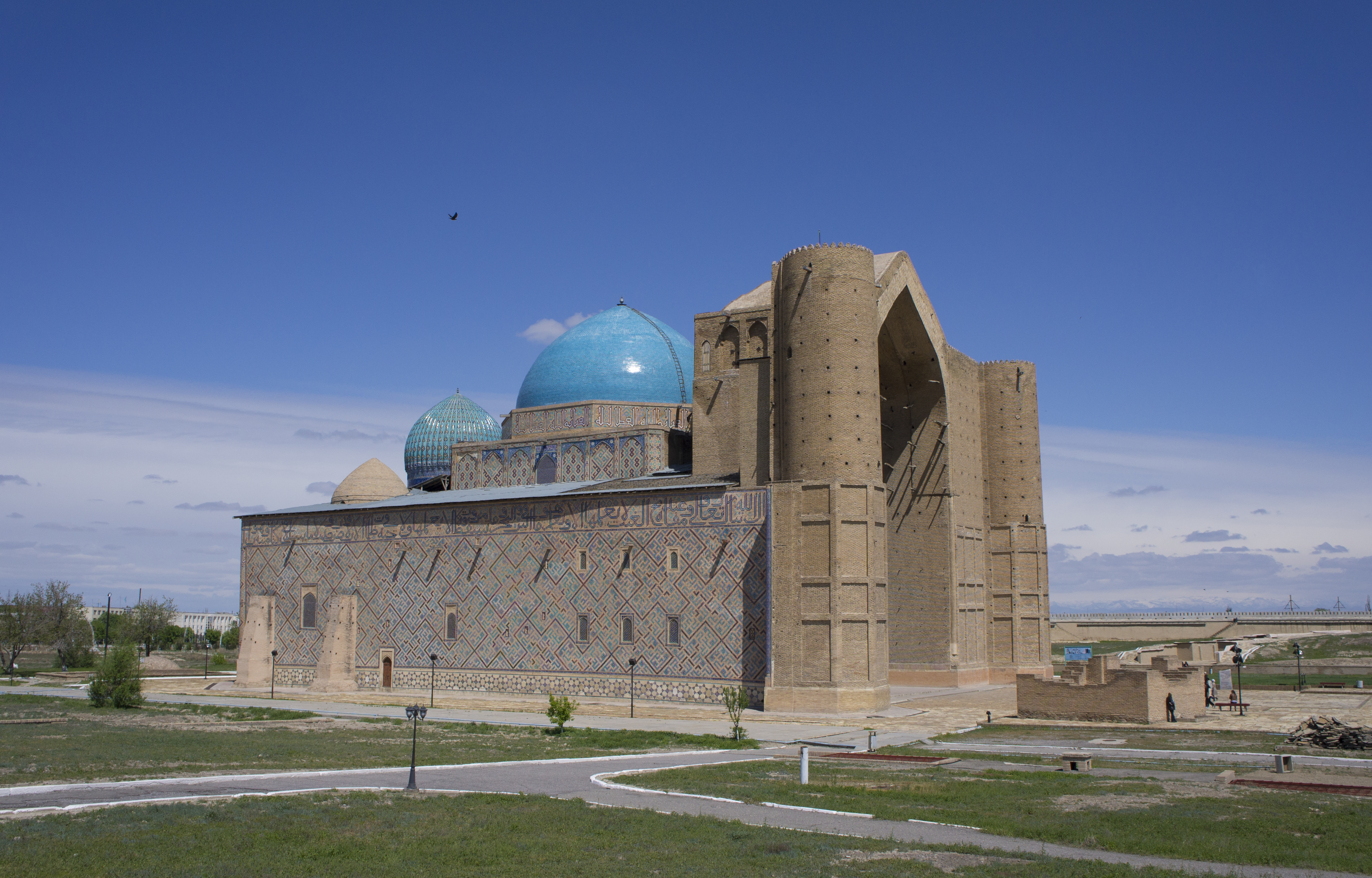
- View of the Mausoleum of Khoja Ahmed Yesevi in Turkestan, Kazakhstan.

- Location within Kazakhstan

General information
- Type: Mausoleum
- Architectural style: Timurid
- Location: Turkistan, Kazakhstan
- Coordinates: 43°17′52″N 68°16′15″E
- Construction started: 14th century

UNESCO World Heritage Site
- Official name: Mausoleum of Khawaja Ahmed Yasawi
- Type: Cultural
- Criteria: i, iii, iv
- Designated: 2003 (27th session)
- Reference no.: 1103
- Region: Asia-Pacific

The Mausoleum of Khawaja Ahmed Yasawi (Kazakh: Қожа Ахмет Яссауи кесенесі, romanized: Qoja Ahmet İassaui kesenesı) is a mausoleum in the city of Turkestan, in southern Kazakhstan. The structure was commissioned in 1389 by Timur, who ruled the area as part of the expansive Timurid Empire, to replace a smaller 12th-century mausoleum of the famous Turkic poet and Sufi mystic, Khoja Ahmed Yasawi (1093–1166). However, construction was halted with the death of Timur in 1405.

Despite its incomplete state, the mausoleum has survived as one of the best-preserved of all Timurid constructions. Its creation marked the beginning of the Timurid architectural style. The experimental spatial arrangements, innovative architectural solutions for vault and dome constructions, and ornamentations using glazed tiles made the structure the prototype for this distinctive art, which spread across the empire and beyond.

The religious structure continues to draw pilgrims from across Central Asia and has come to epitomize the Kazakh national identity. It has been protected as a national monument, while UNESCO recognized it as the country's first site of patrimony, declaring it a World Heritage Site in 2003.

Location of the mausoleum within the town's defensive walls.

== Location ==
The Mausoleum of Khawaja Ahmed Yasawi is situated in the north-eastern part of the modern-day town of Turkestan (formerly known as Hazrat-e Turkestan), an ancient centre of caravan trade known earlier as Khazret and later as Yasi, in the southern part of Kazakhstan. The structure is within the vicinity of a historic citadel, which is now an archaeological site.

Remains of medieval structures such as other mausoleums, mosques and bath houses characterize the archaeological area. To the north of the Mausoleum of Khawaja Ahmed Yasawi, a reconstructed section of the citadel wall from the 1970s separates the historical area from the developments of the modern town.

== History ==
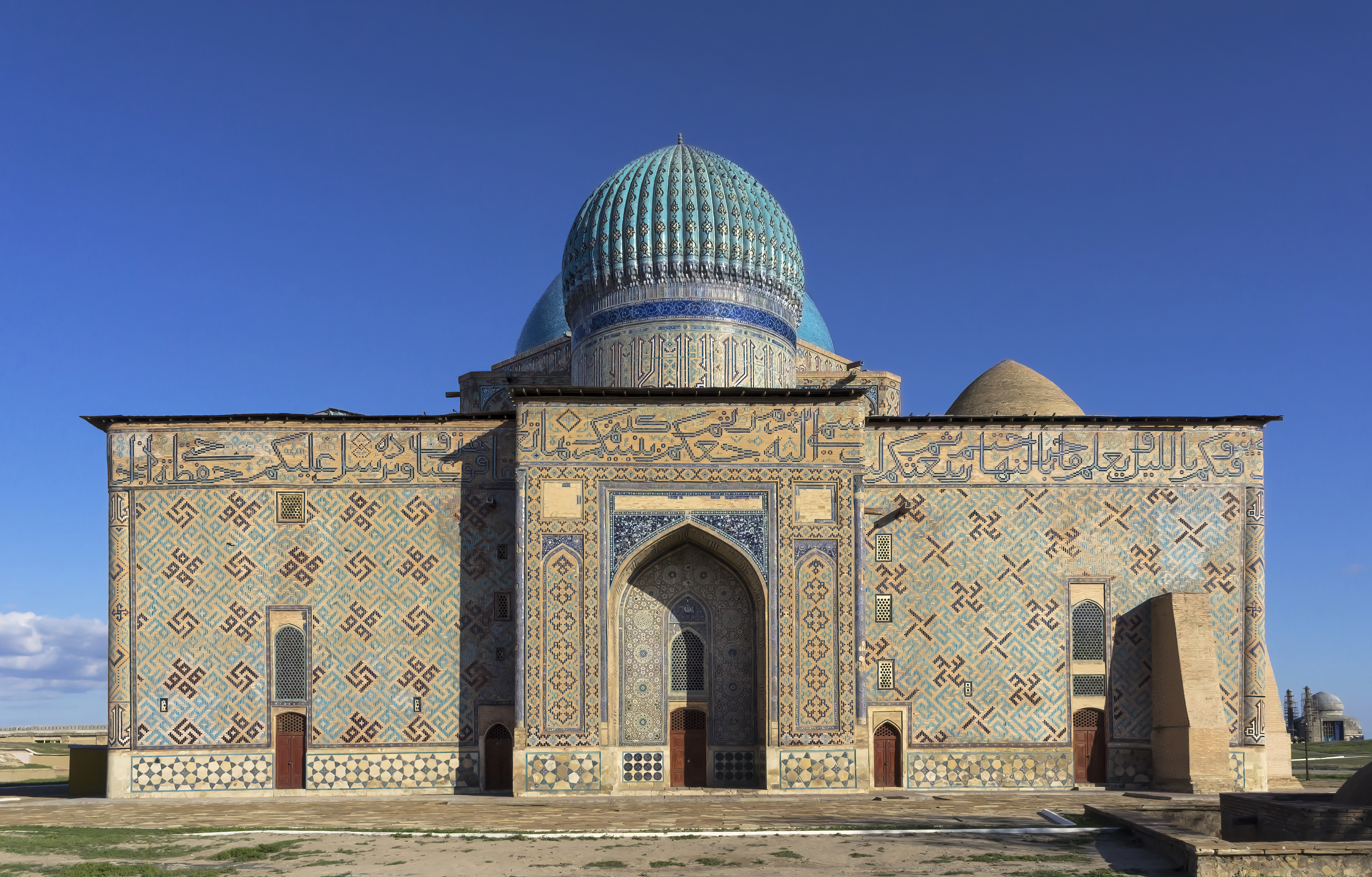
Rear view of mausoleum where banna'i technique - patterns of glazed brickwork - can be best observed.

=== Khawaja Ahmed Yasawi ===
Khoja Ahmed Yasawi (Khawaja or Khwaja (Persian: خواجه pronounced khâje) corresponds to "master", whence Arabic: خواجة khawājah), also spelled as Khawajah Akhmet Yassawi, was the 12th-century head of a regional school of Sufism, a mystic movement in Islam which began in the 9th century. He was born in Ispidjab (modern Sayram) in 1093, and spent most of his life in Yasi, dying there in 1166. He is widely revered in Central Asia and the Turkic-speaking world for popularizing Sufism, which sustained the diffusion of Islam in the area despite the contemporary onslaught of the Mongol invasion. The theological school he created turned Yasi into the most important centre of learning in the region. He was also an outstanding poet, philosopher and statesman. Yasawi was interred in a small mausoleum, which became a pilgrimage site for Muslims.

=== New mausoleum ===
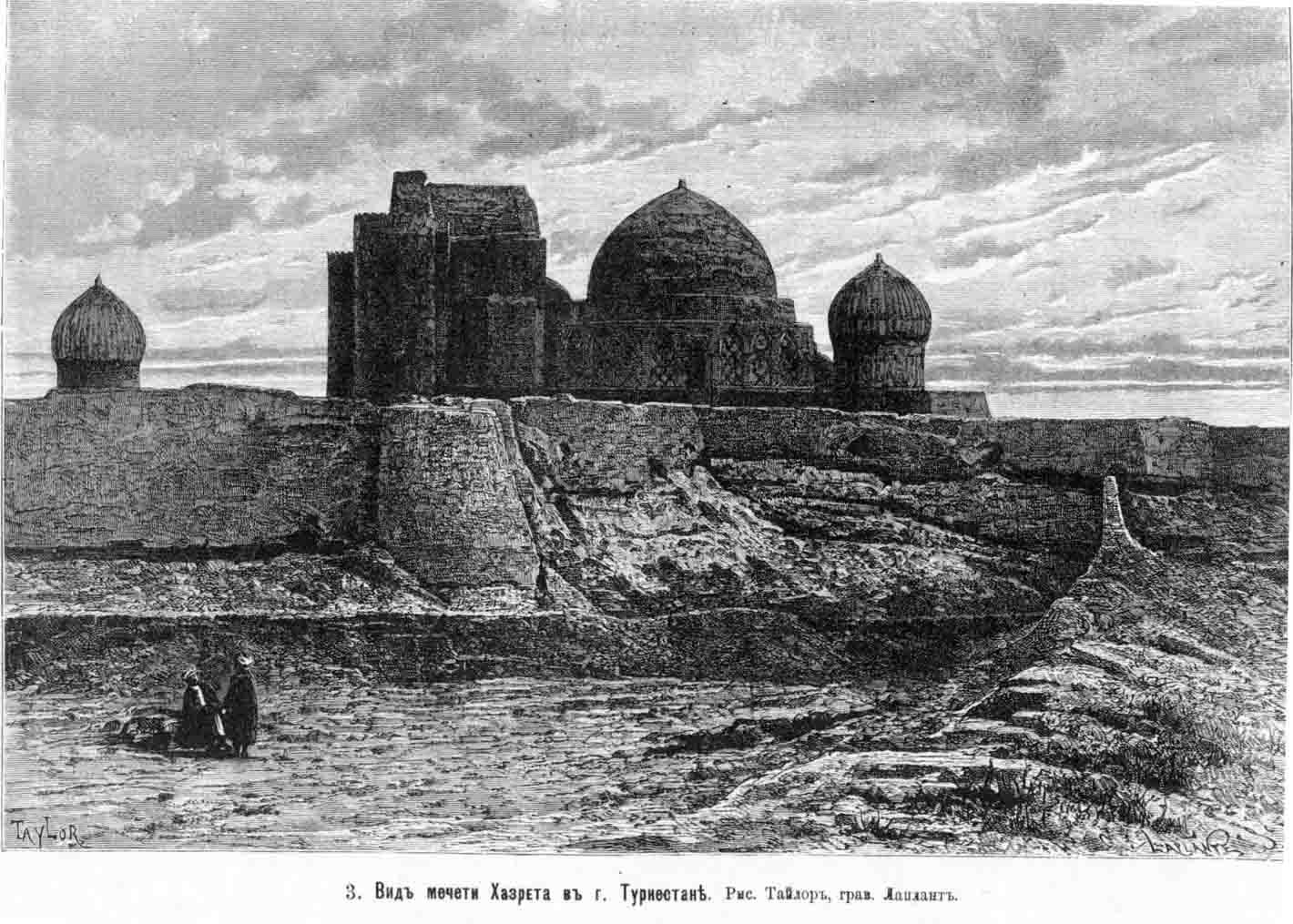
A view of the mausoleum, ca. 1879.

The town of Yasi was largely spared during the Mongol invasion of Khwarezmia in the 13th century. Over time, the descendants of the Mongols settled in the area and converted to Islam. The town then came under the control of the Timurid dynasty in the 1360s. Timur (Tamerlane), the founder of the dynasty, expanded the empire's realm to include Mesopotamia, Iran, and all of Transoxiana, with its capital located in Samarkand. To gain the support of local citizens, Timur adopted the policy of constructing monumental public and cult buildings. In Yasi, he put his attention to the construction of a larger mausoleum to house Yasawi's remains, with the intention of glorifying Islam, promoting its further dissemination, and improving the governance of the immediate areas.

The new mausoleum was begun in 1389. Timur imported builders from cities which he laid waste during his campaigns, including mosaic-workers from Shiraz and stonemasons and stucco-workers from Isfahan. The master builders were led by Khwaja Hosein Shirazi from Iran. Tradition holds that Timur himself participated in the design of the structure, where he introduced experimental spatial arrangements, types of vaults and domes. These innovations were later implemented in the religious edifices of other cities. However, the mausoleum was left unfinished, when Timur died in 1405.

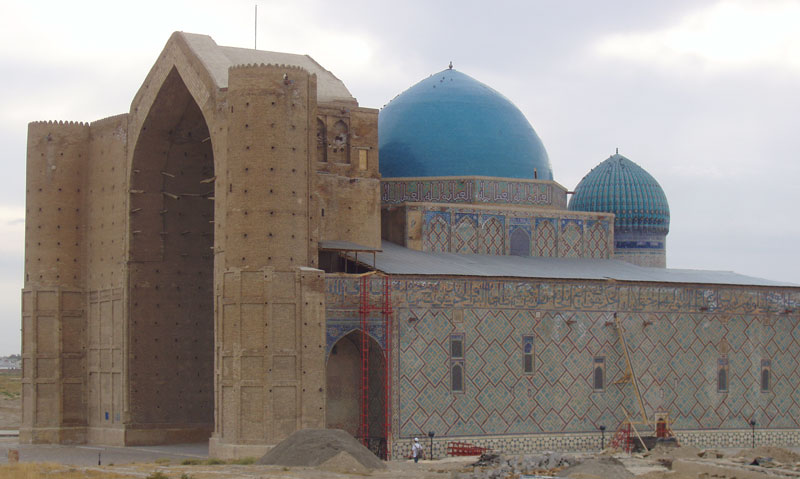
The dome of Khoja Ahmed Yasawi's mausoleum is the largest in Central Asia.

=== Decline and preservation ===
When the Timurid Empire disintegrated, control of the immediate territory passed on to the Kazakh Khanate, which made Yasi, then renamed Turkestan, its capital in the 16th century. The khans (Turkic for "ruler") sought to strengthen the political and religious importance of Turkestan to unify the nomadic tribes within the young state. Hence, as the khanate's political center, ceremonies for the elevation of the khans to the throne and missions from neighboring states were received in Turkestan. The Kazakh nobility also held their most important meetings to decide state-related matters in the capital.

Plan of Mausoleum.

The town, situated on the border of the nomadic and settled cultures, flourished as the khanate's largest trade and craft center. Fortifications were erected to safeguard this commercial role, including the 19th-century construction of defensive walls around the unfinished mausoleum, which became an important landmark and pilgrimage center of the town. In the succeeding centuries, Turkestan and its historic monuments became connected with the idea of the Kazakh state system. Political struggles and the shift in overland trade in favor of maritime routes soon led to the town's decline, before it finally passed on to the Russian Empire in 1864.

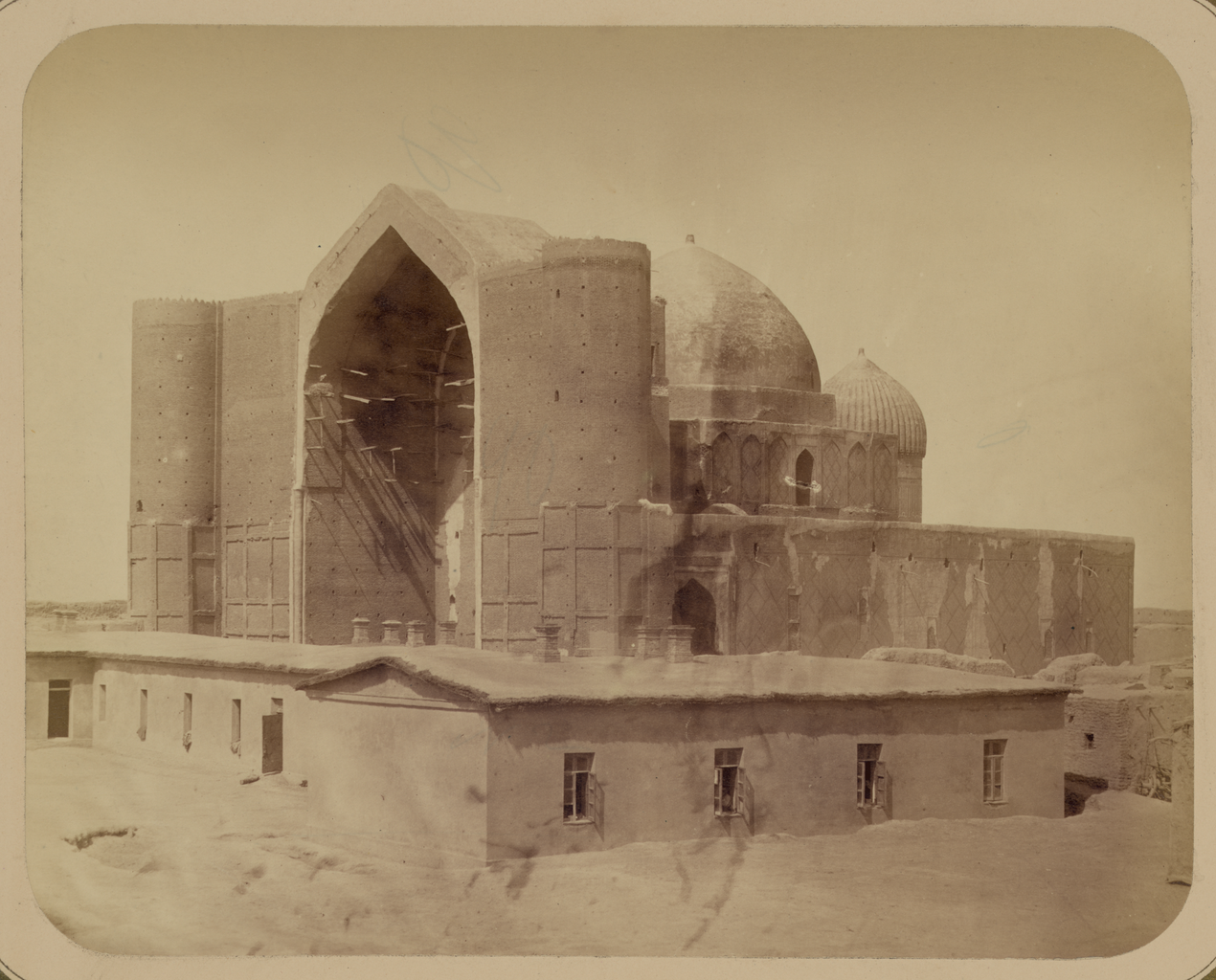
General View of Sultan Akhmed Yassavi's Mausoleum from the Southern Side (historic photo, created on around 1865-1872)

The town was eventually deserted; a new town center was developed west of the area, built around a new railway station. The territory came under Soviet rule by the 20th century. The new administration carried out preservation and restoration work on site, although they considered it more as an architectural rather than a spiritual structure. Hence, the mausoleum was closed to the devotees who came to pay homage to Yasawi. Nevertheless, the local khoja based at the mausoleum allowed pilgrims to secretly enter the structure at night. Beginning in 1922, several commissions took part in the technical investigation of the building. Regular maintenance has been in place beginning in 1938, while a series of restoration campaigns were started in 1945, with the last one being held from 1993 to 2000. Among the latest conservation steps implemented were the replacement of the structure's clay foundation with reinforced concrete, the consolidation of walls, the waterproofing of the roofs, and the layering of new tiles, based on historic designs and patterns, on the domes. The continuous conservation works have been in place when Kazakhstan gained its independence. The building is protected as a national monument and is included on the List of National Properties of Kazakhstan. The site is under the administration of the Azret-Sultan State Historical and Cultural Reserve Museum, in charge with the safeguarding, research, conservation, monitoring and maintenance of the mausoleum.

== Architecture ==
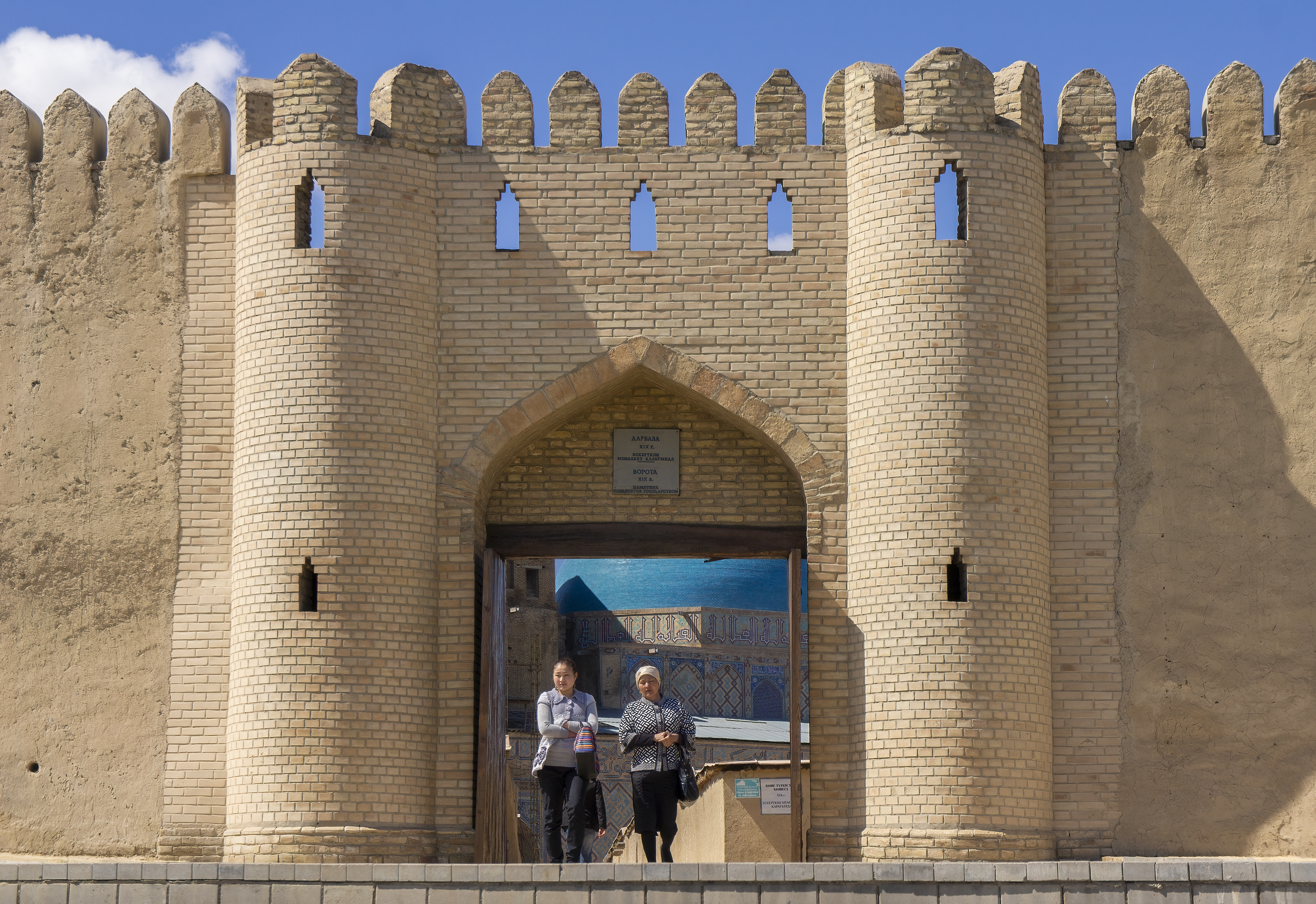
Walls of the mausoleum

The unfinished state of the Mausoleum of Khawaja Ahmed Yasawi, especially at the entrance portal and sections of the interior, allow for the better architectural scrutiny of how the monument was designed and constructed. The structure is rectangular in plan, measuring 45.8 × 62.7 m (150.3 × 205.7 ft), and is 38.7 m (127.0 ft) high. It is oriented from the south-east to the north-west.

The primary material used for the building is ganch—fired brick mixed with mortar, gypsum and clay—which was made in a plant located in Sauran. Layers of clay reaching a depth of 1.5 m (4.9 ft), to prevent water penetration, were used for the original foundation. These were replaced with reinforced concrete in modern restoration works. The main entrance to the mausoleum is from the south-east, through which visitors are ushered into the 18.2 × 18.2-m (59.7 × 59.7-ft) Main Hall, known as Kazandyk (the "copper room"). The section is covered by the largest extant brick dome in Central Asia, also measuring 18.2 m (59.7 ft) in diameter. At the center of the Kazandyk is a bronze cauldron, used for religious purposes. The tomb of Yasawi is situated on the central axis at the end of the building in the northwest, with the sarcophagus located exactly at the center of the section, which has a double dome ribbed roof —the inner dome being 17.0 m (55.8 ft) high and the outer dome being 28.0 m (91.9 ft) high. The dome exterior is covered with hexagonal green glazed tiles with gold patterns. The interior is adorned with alabaster stalactites, known as muqarnas. Additional rooms in the structure, totaling more than 35, include meeting rooms, a refectory, a library, and a mosque, where fragments remain of the light blue geometric and floral ornaments on its walls. The mausoleum's exterior walls are covered in glazed tiles constituting geometric patterns with Kufic and Suls epigraphic ornaments derived from the Qur'an. Initial plans also called for the addition of two minarets, but this was not realized when construction was halted in 1405.

== Legacy ==
=== Birth of Timurid architecture ===
The construction of the mausoleum provided important advances in building technology, displaying unsurpassed records of all kinds in terms of its vaulted constructions and artistic innovations. The achievements derived from the mausoleum's erection, together with the Timurids’ patronage of music, calligraphy, Persian miniature painting, literature, and various scientific pursuits, gave birth to a distinct Islamic artistic style, to be known as Timurid.

The spacious structure employed a radially symmetrical plan for spatial arrangement. The visual balance created by the precise construction became a characteristic aesthetic feature of Timurid buildings—one which would famously be adopted by the Mughal Architecture of India, especially in the gardens and structures of Humayun's Tomb and Taj Mahal, both commissioned by descendants of Timur.

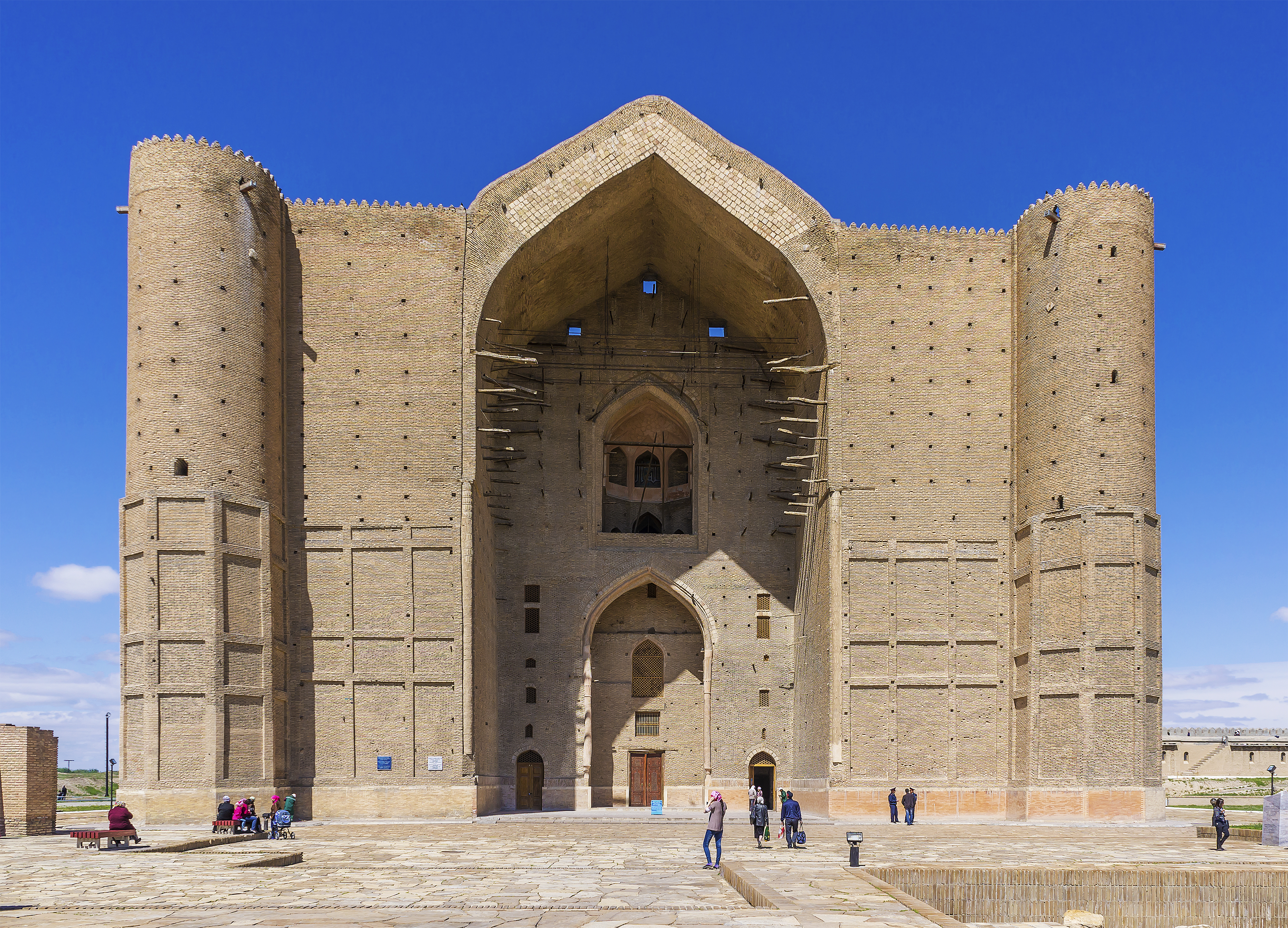
Entrance to mausoleum. Typical architecture of Timurid type.

The double dome technique executed in the mausoleum made possible the huge domes of the Timurid era. The dome is created by employing a squinch, or corner bracketing, that allows for the transition from a square, octagonal or 16-sided base to a dome top. Indeed, the mausoleum's main dome remains the largest existing brick dome in Central Asia.

The use of glazed tiles, mosaics, patterned brickwork, and Islamic calligraphy was also influential. Advances in pottery techniques allowed for the mass production of glazed tiles used for various decorative functions. Among the techniques devised for tile decoration are:

- Banna’i technique: the "builder's technique," consists of revetment of glazed bricks set within unglazed ones to form geometric patterns
- Haftrangi: a technique that permits the creation of multi-colored patterns on the same tile before firing without letting the colors mix
- Faience: a patterned arrangement of closely fitted small pieces of tiles which have surface glaze of different colors

The employment of tiles and muqarnas bear strong influence from Iran, where many of Timur's architects were from. The covered surfaces create visual effects based on how the observer would view the building, and "read" the calligraphic messages.

Timurid tile work did not merely embellish a building as an 'applied' decoration. Rather, in the hands of the architect it was viewed as an intrinsic element of its conception, as a perfect object. Most tile patterns were based on a complex system of proportions and measurements or girih. Skilled artisans permutated the girih system and produced highly sophisticated and fractal 'quasi-crystalline' wall patterns. Historians also narrate how building settings combined with theatrical props such as silk curtains, awnings, vertical screens and lamps reflecting in giant mirrors to produce memorable spaces.

— Dr. Manu P. Sobti, School of Architecture and Urban Planning, University of Wisconsin–Milwaukee

The tile work was also used to obscure the structural joints of the building. The use of turquoise and azure-blue as the prominent color of choice for many structures were meant to contrast with the bright sunlight of the Central Asian desert.

Prominent examples of Timurid domes: from Turkestan's Mausoleum of Khoja Ahmed Yasawi, left, and from Samarkand's Gur-i Amir, right.

The mausoleum's construction at a time when many other Central Asian settlements had been experiencing building sprees under Timur's political ideology allowed for the exchange of ideas and techniques across the empire. Master builders and laborers from the conquered cities congregated to build projects. The employment of Persian architects in leading the major construction activities resulted in the introduction of Persian elements in the Timurid style. This and the Timurids’ general patronage of the arts have made them the greatest patrons of Iranian culture.

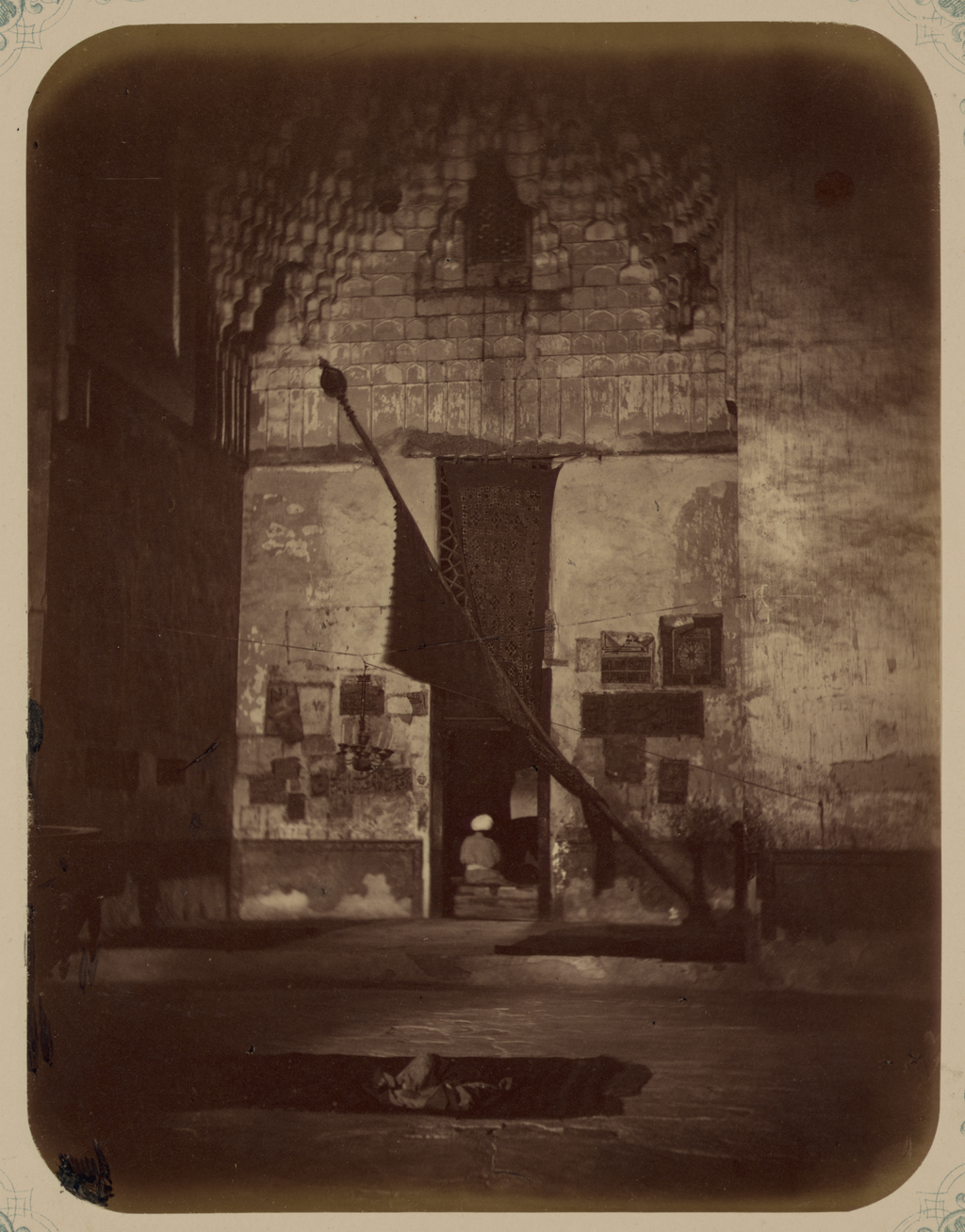
The interior view of the Mausoleum of Ahmad Yasavi.

The landmark architectural and artistic solutions realized in the erection of the Mausoleum of Khoja Ahmed Yasawi were immediately utilized in other building endeavors, such as contemporary works in Samarkand, Herat, Meshed, Khargird, Tayabad, Baku and Tabriz. It is thought that the peak of Timurid architecture could be found in the buildings of Samarkand. Timur filled his capital with both secular and religious monuments, as well as a plethora of gardens, which featured stone walls and floors with elaborate patterns and palaces outfitted with gold, silk and carpets. Among these are:

- Bibi-Khanum Mosque: the world's largest mosque when it was completed in 1404; it displays Timur's concern for monumental effect and theatrical arrangement
- Gur-i-Amir Mausoleum: the burial place of Timur; it contains a double shell dome for the achievement of a vertical effect
- Shah-i Zinda Complex: a funerary complex presenting the pinnacle of every tile technique known to the Timurids
- Registan: considered the pinnacle of Timurid architecture; a broad plaza fronted by the towering edifices of three madrassas (Islamic schools), even if none of them were commissioned by Timur himself and were built in a later period by Ulug Beg and Governor Yalangtush.

The mausoleum is thus seen as a prototype, marking the beginning of a new architectural style, which culminated in the monuments of Samarkand, but was also continuously developed as in the case of India's Mughal Architecture. Indeed, the Timurids’ outstanding achievement in architecture is encapsulated in an Arab proverb from one of Timur's buildings, "If you want to know about us, observe our buildings." It is also for this reason that UNESCO has recognized the mausoleum as a World Heritage Site in 2003, following the same international recognition for the sites of Samarkand, Humayun's Tomb and Taj Mahal.

=== Religious and cultural importance ===
The larger mausoleum which Timurid ordered further enhanced the shrine's religious importance. During the Kazakh Khanate, prominent personalities chose to be buried within the immediate vicinity of the monument. Among these are Abulkhair, Rabi'i Sultan-Begim, Zholbarys-khan, Esim-khan, Ondan-sultan (the son of Shygai-khan), Ablai Khan, Kaz dauysty Kazbek-bi. The mausoleum's holy reputation also reached foreign lands. In the early 16th century, Ubaydullah Khan, the successor to Muhammad Shaybani Kahn of the neighboring Uzbek Khanate, stopped at the mausoleum before his battle against Babur, who would later become the founder of the Mughal Empire. He swore that if he were to emerge victorious, his rule would fully follow the sharia law.

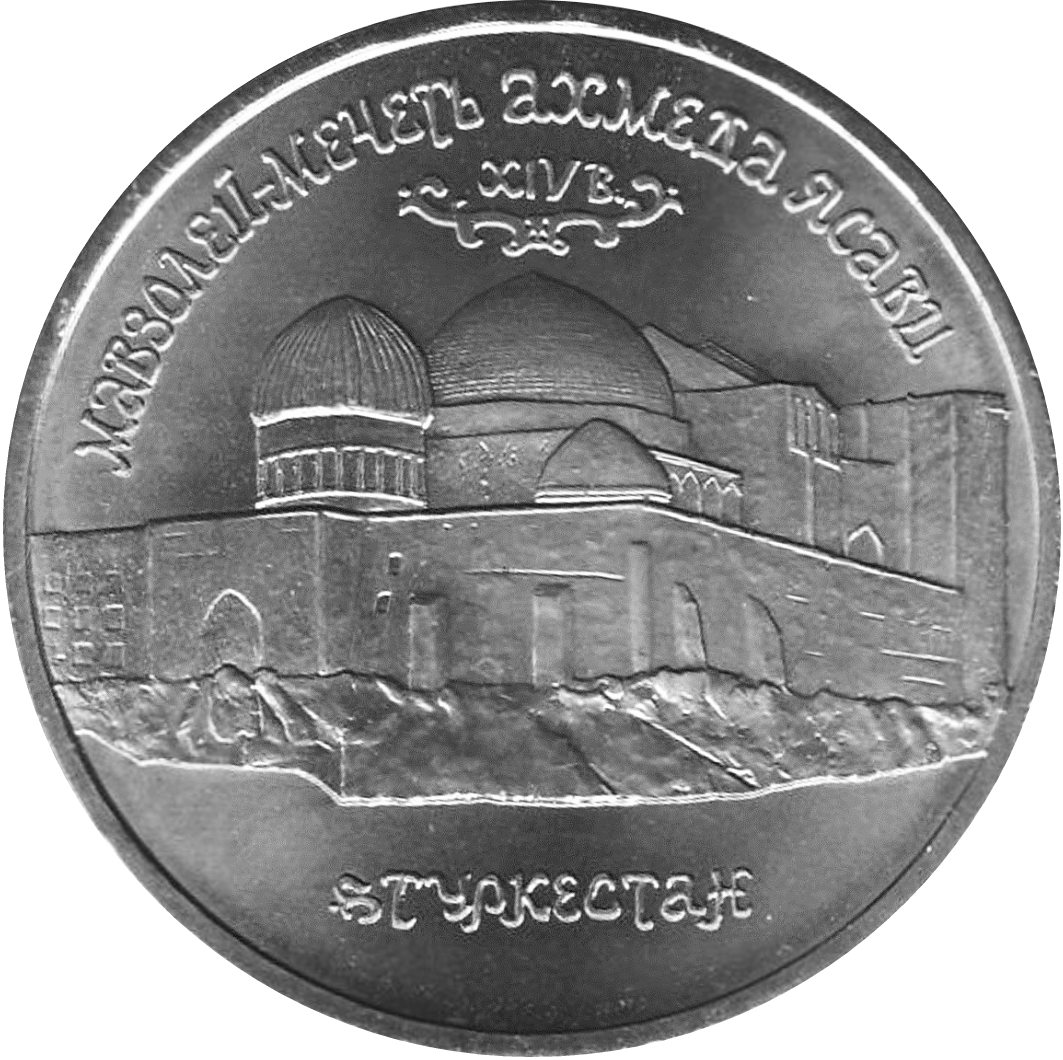
The Mausoleum depicted on a 1992 Russian 5 ruble coin.

Despite the public closure of the monument during the Soviet era, the mausoleum has continued to draw pilgrims once the order was lifted. Up to contemporary times, the Mausoleum of Khoja Ahmed Yasawi has remained an object of pilgrimage for Kazakh Muslims. Hence, the town of Turkestan became the second Mecca for the Muslims of Central Asia. Indeed, the mausoleum's importance to the town is attested by Turkestan's former name, Hazrat-e Turkestan, which literally means "Saint of Turkestan," a direct reference to Yasawi.

As the capital of the preceding Kazakh Khanate, which saw the emergence of the distinct Kazakh nationality, Turkestan remains the cultural heart of modern Kazakhstan. Being the burial site for the Sufi theologian and the khanate's Kazakh nobility, the mausoleum has further enhanced the town's prestige. The continuance of the Kazakh nation and Central Asian Islamic faith in modern times are testaments to the historical and cultural importance of Turkestan, with the Mausoleum of Khoja Ahmed Yasawi at its center. Perceived as one of the greatest mausoleums of the Islamic world, it has survived and remains a significant monument both to faith and architectural achievement in the region.

== See also ==
- History of Kazakhstan
- Islamic architecture
- List of World Heritage Sites in Kazakhstan
- Persian architecture
- Persian domes
