= Abdul Karim Irgashive =

Tajikistani Guantanamo detainee

- Born: May 7, 1965 (age 61)
- Released: July 17, 2004; Tajikistan
- Citizenship: Tajikistan
- Detained at: Guantanamo Bay

Abdul Karim Irgashive (sometimes spelled Ergashev) is a citizen of Tajikistan who was held in extrajudicial detention in the United States Guantanamo Bay detention camps, in Cuba.

The Department of Defense reports that he was born on May 7, 1965, in Dushanbe, Tajikistan and assigned him the Internment Serial Number 641.

Abdul Karim Irgashive was transferred to Tajikistan on July 17, 2004.

== Attempt to sue for compensation ==
On July 22, 2007, Irgashive attempted to sue President Bush for his unjustified extrajudicial detention in Guantanamo. Ergashev described himself as a political refugee, who had been staying in a refugee camp in Afghanistan, when the Americans initiated the American aerial bombardment of Afghanistan. The Ferghana Information Agency reports:

I was a driver in their camp, Everyone scattered when the Americans invaded Afghanistan and bombardments began. I wanted to go home too but couldn't because I did not have any papers or even money. Closer to the end of winter 2002, I drifted to the town of Tahor and the rais or chairman of a nearby village offered me a job. He said I would become his personal driver. I said "Why not?". It was a chance to earn my fare back. The man said the auto was waiting in one of the kishlaks (settlements) in Mazar-e-Sharif and we went there to collect it. The man brought me to some household and asked me to wait while he went and fetched the keys. The Afghani police broke into the building as soon as he left. They had me handcuffed and blindfolded in no time at all and turned me over to the waiting Americans. The Americans had been waiting nearby, you know. They ordered me to don a special blue coverall marking me as a POW. It occurred to me then that they had deliberately left me in the house in order to sell me to the Americans as a terrorist or Talib... I was taken to the city of Bagram where I was imprisoned with very many others for March–May 2002. It was Kandahar after that and finally Guantanamo, in September that year.

The Ferghana Information Agency reports that Ergashev claims he acquired Hepatitis C in Guantanamo, and had his gall bladder removed without explanation.
