= Mausoleum of Rabiya Sultan Begim =

Memorial in Turkistan, southern Kazakhstan

The Mausoleum of Rabiya Sultan Begim is a reconstruction of a late 15th-century monument in the city of Turkistan, now in southern Kazakhstan. It stands about 60 m (200 ft) southeast of the Timurid-era Mausoleum of Khoja Ahmed Yasawi, which became a World Heritage Site in 2003. The mausoleum fell into disrepair and was demolished in 1896. A crypt was rediscovered under the ruins in the 1950s, and the structure was reconstructed in 1980.

Rabiya Sultan Begim was the daughter of the Timurid sultan Ulugh Beg (1394–1449), and so the great-granddaughter of the Timurid dynasty's founder Timur (Tamerlane; 1336–1405). In 1451 she became the fourth wife of Abu'l-Khayr Khan (1412–1468), ruler of the Uzbek Khanate, whose grandson Muhammad Shaybani founded the Shaybanid Khanate of Bukhara, later the Emirate of Bukhara, which survived until 1920. Towards the end of her life she lived in the city of Yasi, now known as Turkistan, where the mausoleum was constructed after her death in 1485.

The structure was a typical of the Timurid period: a main octagonal structure of brick with arched recesses on each façade, topped by a cylindrical drum and dome both decorated with ceramic tiles, and a square brick entrance block facing northwest towards the larger Mausoleum of Khoja Ahmed Yasawi.

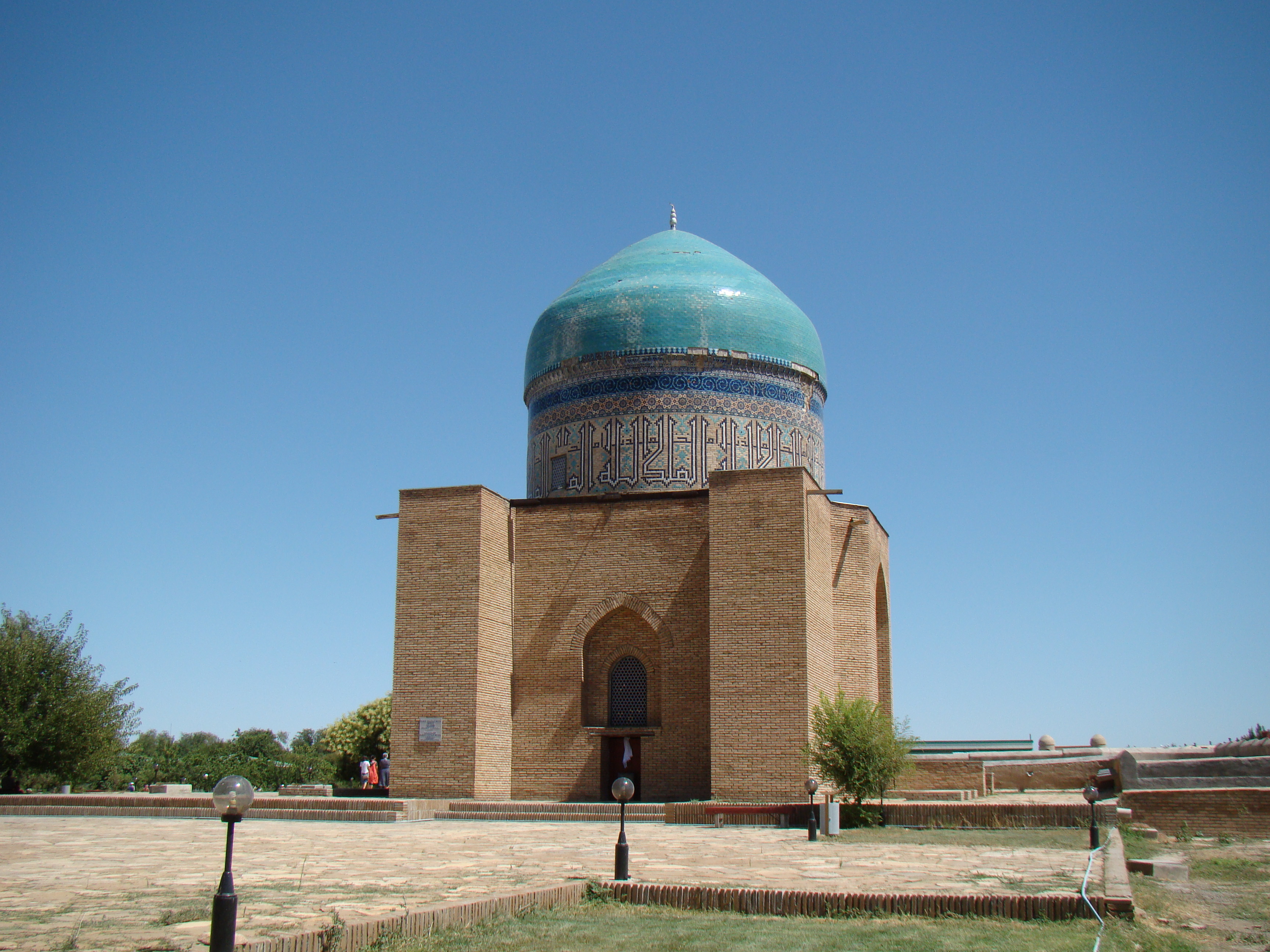
Entrance

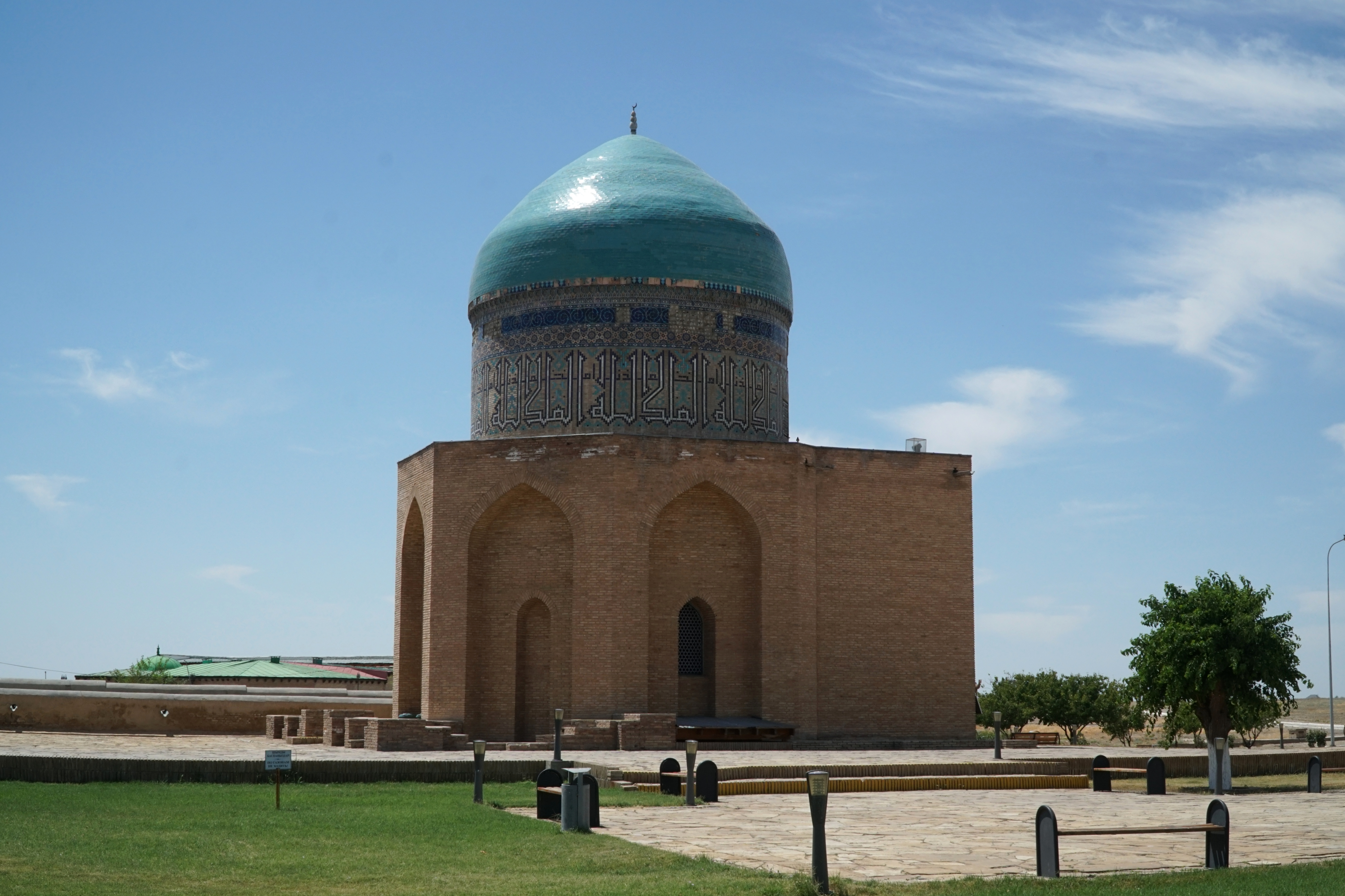
Side elevation

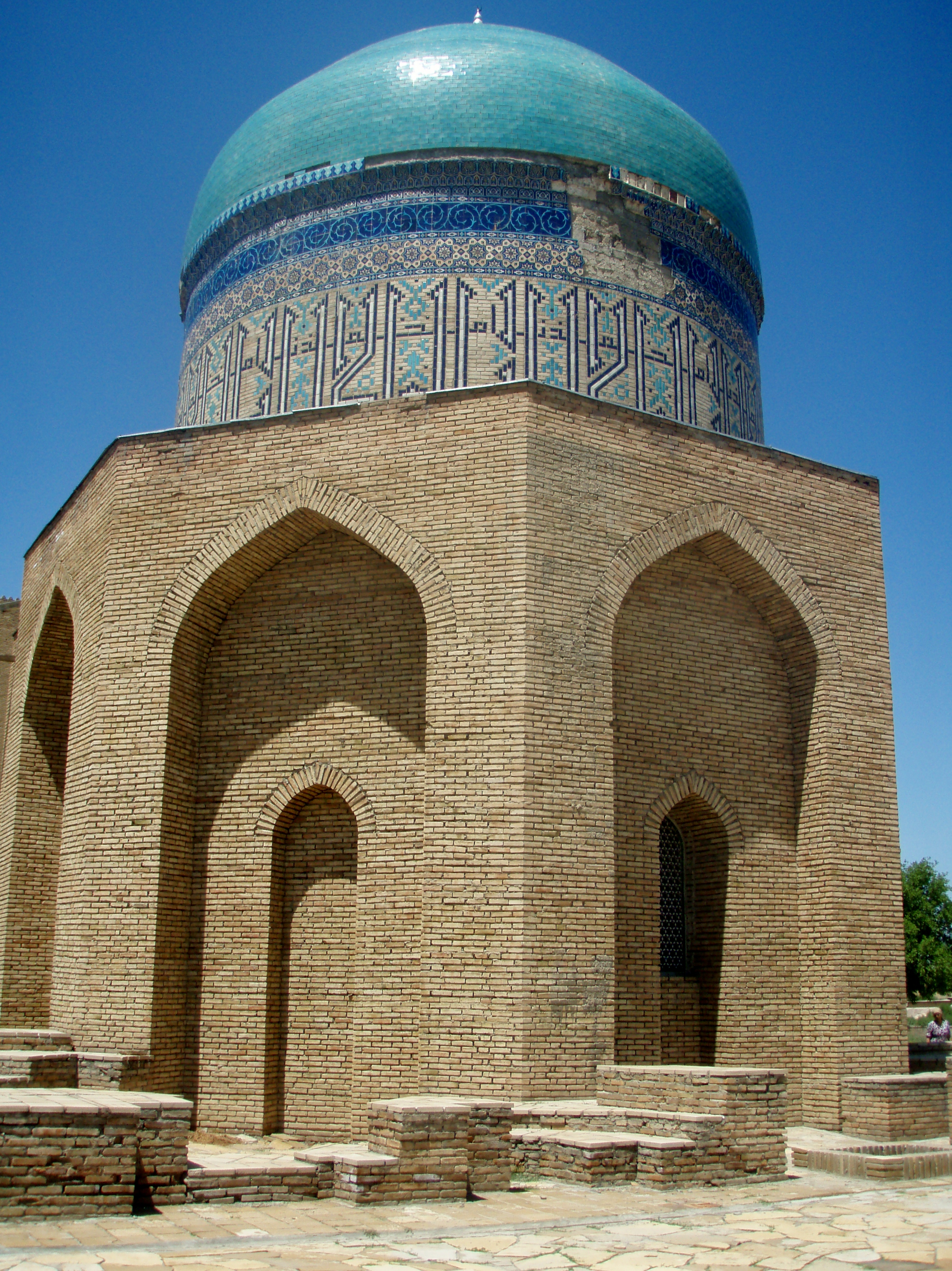
Octagon and dome

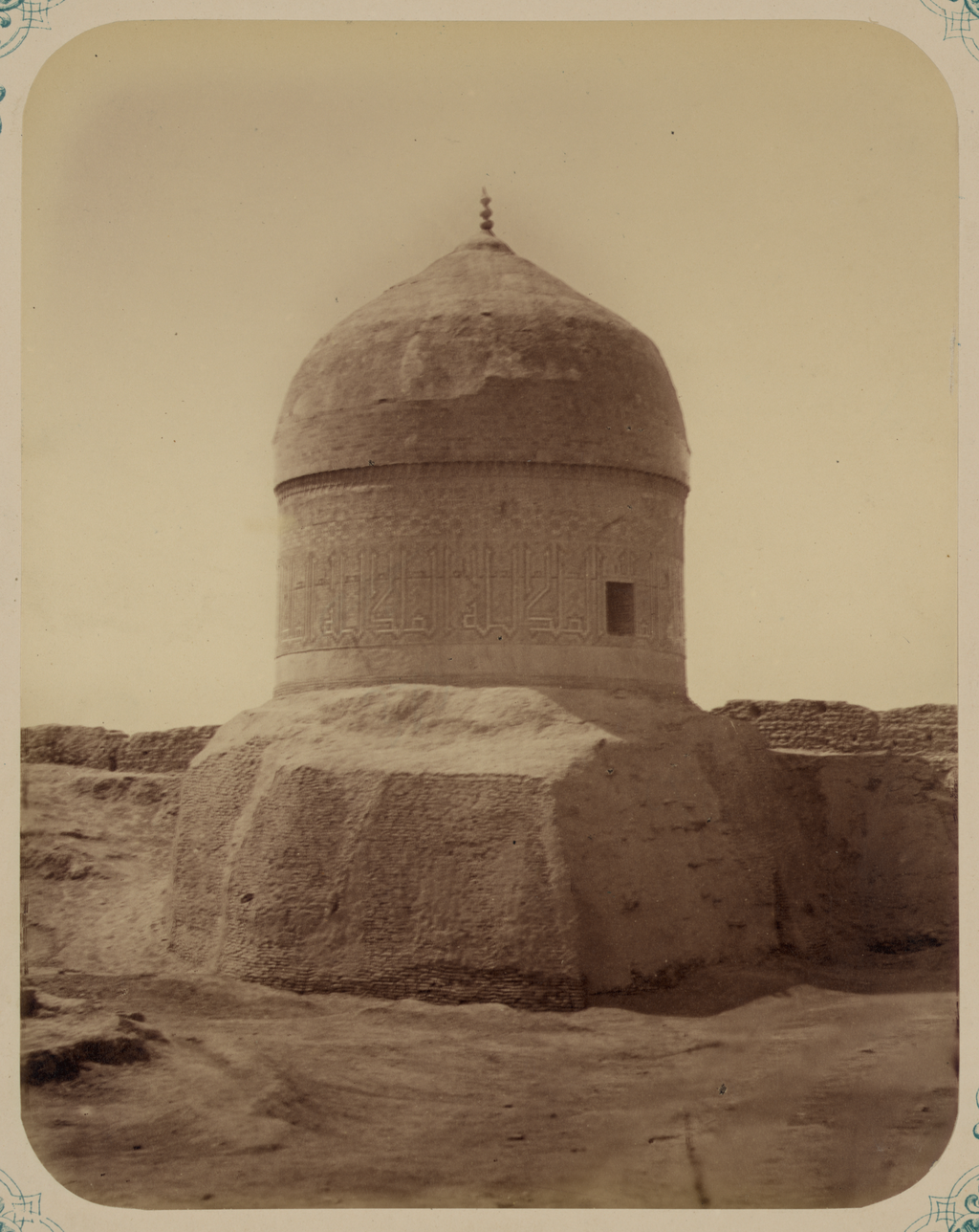
Remains c. 1871, before demolition in 1896

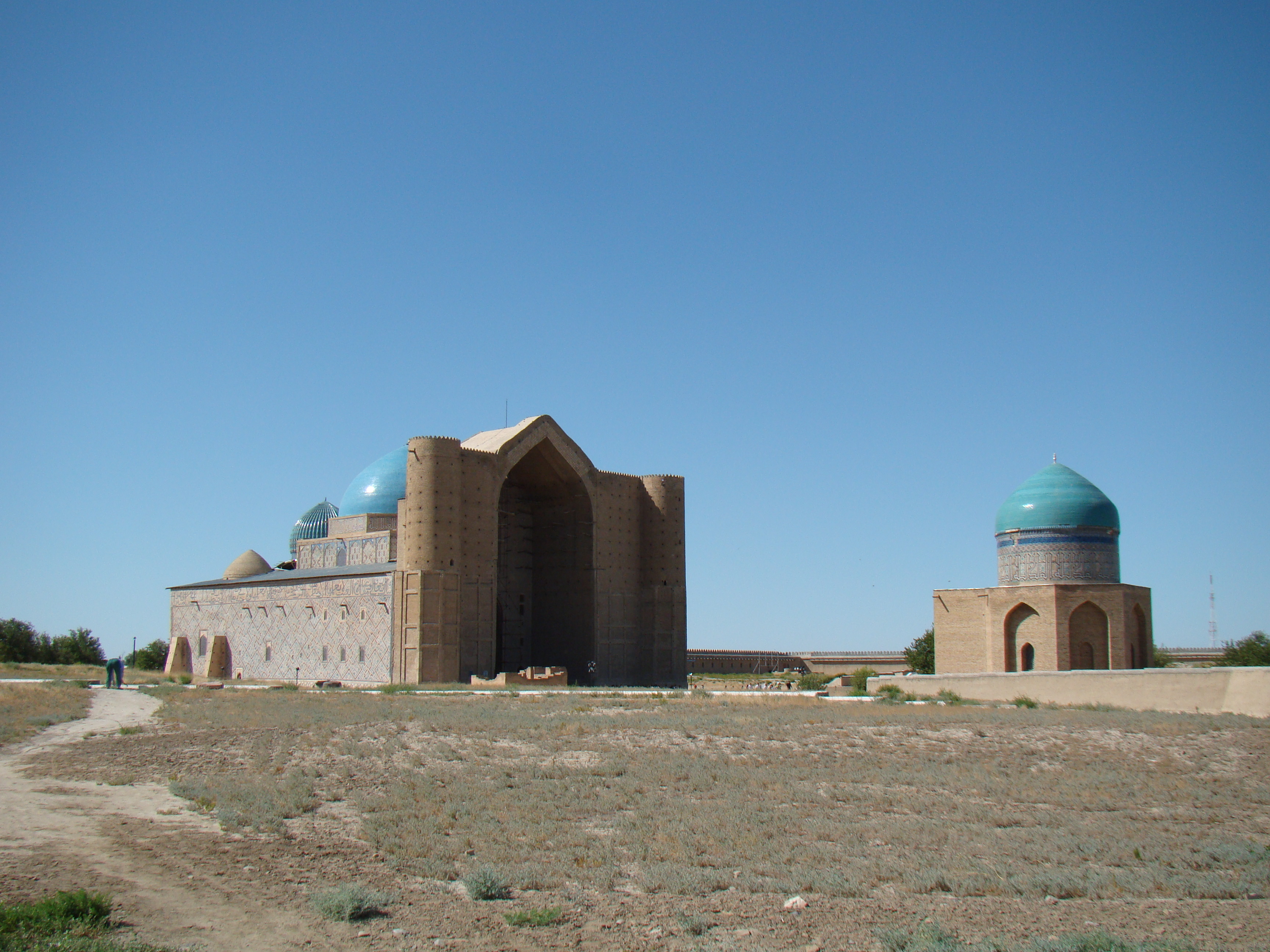
Relationship with the Mausoleum of Khoja Ahmed Yasawi
