= Vosit Vohidov =

Uzbek-Soviet surgeon

Vosit Vohidovich Vohidov
- Born: December 13, 1917; Turkestan
- Died: June 1, 1994 (aged 76); Tashkent
- Occupations: Surgeon, Scientist
- Known for: Founder of the school of specialized surgical care in Uzbekistan

Vosit Vohidovich Vohidov (Uzbek Cyrillic: Восит Воҳидович Воҳидов; born 13 December 1917, in Turkestan; died on 1 June 1994, in Tashkent) was an Uzbek-Soviet surgeon, scientist and founder of the school of specialized surgical care in Uzbekistan.

== Early life and education ==
Vohidov was born on December 13, 1917, in a peasant family in the village of Chaga in the Russian Turkestan. The Vohidov family was engaged in peasant agriculture on plots near the city of Turkestan. His father Abduvahit Khalmetov had nine children, two of whom died at a young age. Like his older siblings, Vasit also helped his father in the household. His mother Khalmetova Khozhar took care of the family and was concerned about the education of the children.

Vohidov graduated from the Tashkent Medical Institute (now Tashkent Medical Academy) in 1939. In 1950, he defended his dissertation The Function of the Pancreas in Purulent Diseases. His doctoral thesis from 1962 was titled Pleural Adhesions and the Importance of Their Vessels in the Pulmonary Circulation. On November 27, 1973, the decree of the Council of Ministers of the USSR No. 70 and on December 6, 1973, the decree of the Minister of Health of the USSR, Boris Petrovsky, No. 970 "On the Establishment of a Branch of the All-Union Research Institute of Clinical and Experimental Surgery of the Ministry of Health of the USSR in Tashkent" were published.

== Career ==
Vohidov was the head of the department of hospital surgery of the State Medical University of the city of Tashkent and was appointed the director of the VNIIKiEKh branch. He founded the Tashkent branch of the "All-Union Research Center for Surgery" and remained its director until the end of his life.

Vohidov was the author of more than 180 scientific works, which deal with the research of almost all areas of surgery such as diseases of the lung, the mediastinal organs, the biliary tract, the liver, the stomach, the heart and the large vessels of the lower extremities. He trained 15 doctors and 60 candidates of sciences. He was a full member of the World Association of Surgeons, editor of the Medical Journal of Uzbekistan, member of the editorial board of the journal Surgery, named after Nikolai Ivanovich Pirogov.

== Awards ==
- Order of Outstanding Merit (2003) - in memory of our compatriots who have made an invaluable contribution to the development of science and culture of Uzbekistan, who devoted their entire lives to the cause of prosperity of the country, careful preservation of the spirituality of the people, given their invaluable scientific and creative heritage.
- Order of Lenin (1976)
- Order of the October Revolution (1981)
- Order of the Badge of Honour (1961) - for great merits in the field of health protection of the Soviet people and the development of medical science.
