= Muhibullo Abdulkarim Umarov =

Tajik Guantanamo detainee

Moyuballah Homaro or Muhibullo Abdulkarim Umarov is a citizen of Tajikistan who was held in extrajudicial detention in the United States Guantanamo Bay detainment camps, in Cuba. According to the Department of Defense, he was born on October 6, 1980, in Alisurkhan, Tajikistan. His Internment Serial Number was 729.

Moyuballah Homaro was transferred to Tajikistan on March 31, 2004.

== Identity ==
The first official list, of all Guantanamo detainees, who had been held in military custody, the US Department of Defense released, on May 15, 2006, listed his name as Moyuballah Homaro.

== Capture and Guantanamo detention ==
Umarov traveled to Pakistan, as a refugee from Tajikistan's civil war, in 1994, where he finished his education. In May 2001, when he graduated, a new Tajikistan government gave him a passport. Umarov returned to Pakistan, seeking work, on his legitimate passport. He was caught up in round up of foreigners following Pakistan's first suicide bombing, in May 2002. Pakistan handed him over to the Americans, and he spent several months in Bagram, and two years in Afghanistan.

When Umarov was eventually released from Guantanamo the Americans did not return his passport. Instead they gave him a letter saying they no longer regarded him as a threat. Umarov says this letter, and his lack of real identity documents is a constant source of threats to his safety.

== Bagram ==
Umarov spent several months in an American prison in Bagram airport.

In two months at bagram, Umarov says, he had only one interrogation -- with an American woman who questioned him in Persian [sic] and seemed confused as to why he was there. 'We were along in the room,' he says. 'She checked my documents and listened to my answers, then told me I wasn't guilty.' ...

== Guantanamo ==
Nevertheless Umarov, Abdughaffor and Mazharuddin, the two other Tajik men he was captured with, were sent to Guantanamo in early August 2002.

== See also ==
- Bagram torture and prisoner abuse
