= Don't Forget Us Here =

2021 American book by Mansoor Adayfi

Don't Forget Us Here: Lost and Found at Guantanamo
- Author: Mansoor Adayfi
- Language: English
- Publisher: Hachette Books
- Publication date: August 17, 2021
- Publication place: United States
- Pages: 384
- ISBN: 978-0306923869

Don't Forget Us Here: Lost and Found at Guantánamo is a 2021 memoir by Mansoor Adayfi. As an 18-year-old man, he was sent to Afghanistan to do research but never returned. After being kidnapped by Afghan warlords, he was sold to the United States in the aftermath of the September 11 attacks. In Kandahar, he was stripped naked, beaten, and interrogated by the Americans about his link to Al-Qaeda. He was imprisoned without being charged at the Guantánamo Bay detention camp, where he was stripped of his name and was known as Prisoner 441. Adayfi describes in his memoir how he survived for 14 years until his 2016 release. Adayfi collaborated with writer Antonio Aiello.

== Synopsis ==
Don't Forget Us Here is the memoir of a man who was in detention at Guantánamo Bay for 14 years. The book is a series of manuscripts Mansoor Adayfi wrote while he was imprisoned at Guantánamo and sent to his attorneys as letters; he then used them as the basis of his book, which he wrote in collaboration with Antonio Aiello. While in prison, Adayafi became a stubborn fighter who led prison riots and hunger strikes. Adayfi was known as Detainee 441 in Guantánamo; He tried to persuade his captors he had not been cooperating with Al-Qaeda. According to the book, to avoid torture, he confessed to be a member of al-Qaeda.

According to Adayfi, Americans were more interested in taking revenge for the attacks than in finding out the detainees' identities and what they had done. He said: "I had only heard about the Sept.11 attacks." Adayfi writes that Maj. Gen. Geoffrey D. Miller, the Guantánamo commander from 2002 to 2004, "turned the camp into where everything seemed designed to humiliate and demean us."

At his hearing in front of a panel that was meant to evaluate detainees, he read out a statement telling them again he was not a member of Al-Qaeda; "But after what they had done to us, I would join al-Qaeda," Adayfi added. He writes: "I wanted to teach them that they couldn’t kill us and torture us and expect us to love them for it. No; I wanted them to see what they had created."

By 2016, after 14 years of detention at Guantanamo Bay, the US government had not yet charged him with a crime or confirmed his detention was lawful. A review board decided he was not a threat to the United States and he was allowed to have a new life in Serbia.

== Reception ==
According to Andrew Solomon, this book has compact, powerful prose. It is narrated by a natural storyteller but this fate is almost coincidental. Solomon said it takes courage to survive these experiences and write a story, and that reading it also takes courage. He said only a few books change history, and this book may be one of them.

Ron Chernow believes the memoir paints a gruesome picture of the insane bureaucracy, as well as the intense resistance and eventual salvation of an innocent Yemeni man who is being held in a hellish prison.

According to Azar Nafisi, this book is both heartbreaking and joyful; it depicts the horrendous reality of life for Guantanamo detainees but it is also about flexibility in the face of such a reality, and the joy of being alive, maintaining a sense of dignity and identity in the worst circumstances.

Melissa Fleming, UN Under-Secretary-General for Global Communications, said the book takes readers inside the mind of a young man who refused to be broken by mental and physical torture. His style of writing became an important record, opening a window of humanity into a secretive place. Mansour says he survived 14 years of torture and persecution thanks to his religious faith and intense resistance.

Jonathan Hansen, author of Guantánamo, said some confessions in the book suggest despite US military command and politicians, knowing they were torturing innocent people for years, did not stop it. According to Hansen, this is an enlightening account of Guantanamo from the Muslim point of view.

== See also ==
- Guantánamo
- Abu Ghraib prison
- September 11 attacks
- United States war crimes
- Guantanamo Bay hunger strikes
