= List of commemorative coins of Russia (1992) =

This is a list of commemorative coins issued by the Central Bank of Russia in 1992:

Commemorative coins issued by the Central Bank of Russia in 1992
Name	Date of issue	Catalogue number	Nominal value	Total mintage	Image (front)	Image (reverse)
Individual issues
750th anniversary of the victory of Alexander Nevsky at Lake Peipus	2 April 1992	5011-0001	3 rubles	100,000		
International Year of Space	9 April 1992	5011-0002	3 rubles	100,000		
Northern Convoys of 1941-1945	2 June 1992	5011-0001	3 rubles	400,000		
Anniversary of the State Sovereignty of Russia	10 June 1992	5009-0001	1 ruble	1,000,000		
190th anniversary of the birth of Pavel Stepanovich Nakhimov	2 July 1992	5009-0002	1 ruble	1,000,000		
110th anniversary of the birth of Yanka Kupala	7 July 1992	5009-0003	1 ruble	1,000,000		
Victory of democratic forces in Russia, 19–21 August 1991	19 August 1992	5011-0004	3 rubles	1,000,000		
110th anniversary of the birth of Yakub Kolas	3 November 1992	5009-0004	1 ruble	1,000,000		
200th anniversary of the birth of Nikolai Ivanovich Lobachevsky	1 December 1992	5009-0005	1 ruble	1,000,000		
Mausoleum of Khoja Ahmed Yasawi in Turkestan (Kazakhstan)	23 December 1992	5012-0001	5 rubles	500,000		
350th anniversary of the voluntary entry of Yakutia into Russia	23 December 1992	5216-0002	50 rubles	25,000		
350th anniversary of the voluntary entry of Yakutia into Russia	23 December 1992	5217-0002	100 rubles	14,000		
Series: Red Data Book
Amur tiger	29 July 1992	5514-0001	10 rubles	300,000		
Red-breasted goose	29 July 1992	5514-0002	10 rubles	300,000		
Central Asian cobra	29 July 1992	5514-0003	10 rubles	300,000		
Series: Age of Enlightenment. 18th century
Trinity Cathedral	24 November 1992	5111-0001	3 rubles	40,000		
Academy of Sciences	24 November 1992	5111-0002	3 rubles	40,000		
Pashkov House	24 November 1992	5216-0001	50 rubles	7,500		
Mikhail Vasilyevich Lomonosov	24 November 1992	5217-0001	100 rubles	5,700		
Battle of Chesma	24 November 1992	5318-0001	150 rubles	3,000		
Catherine II. Legislatress	24 November 1992	5415-0001	25 rubles	5,500		
