= Turkistan (city) =

City in Turkistan Region, Kazakhstan

Turkistan Түркістан / Türkıstan (Kazakh)
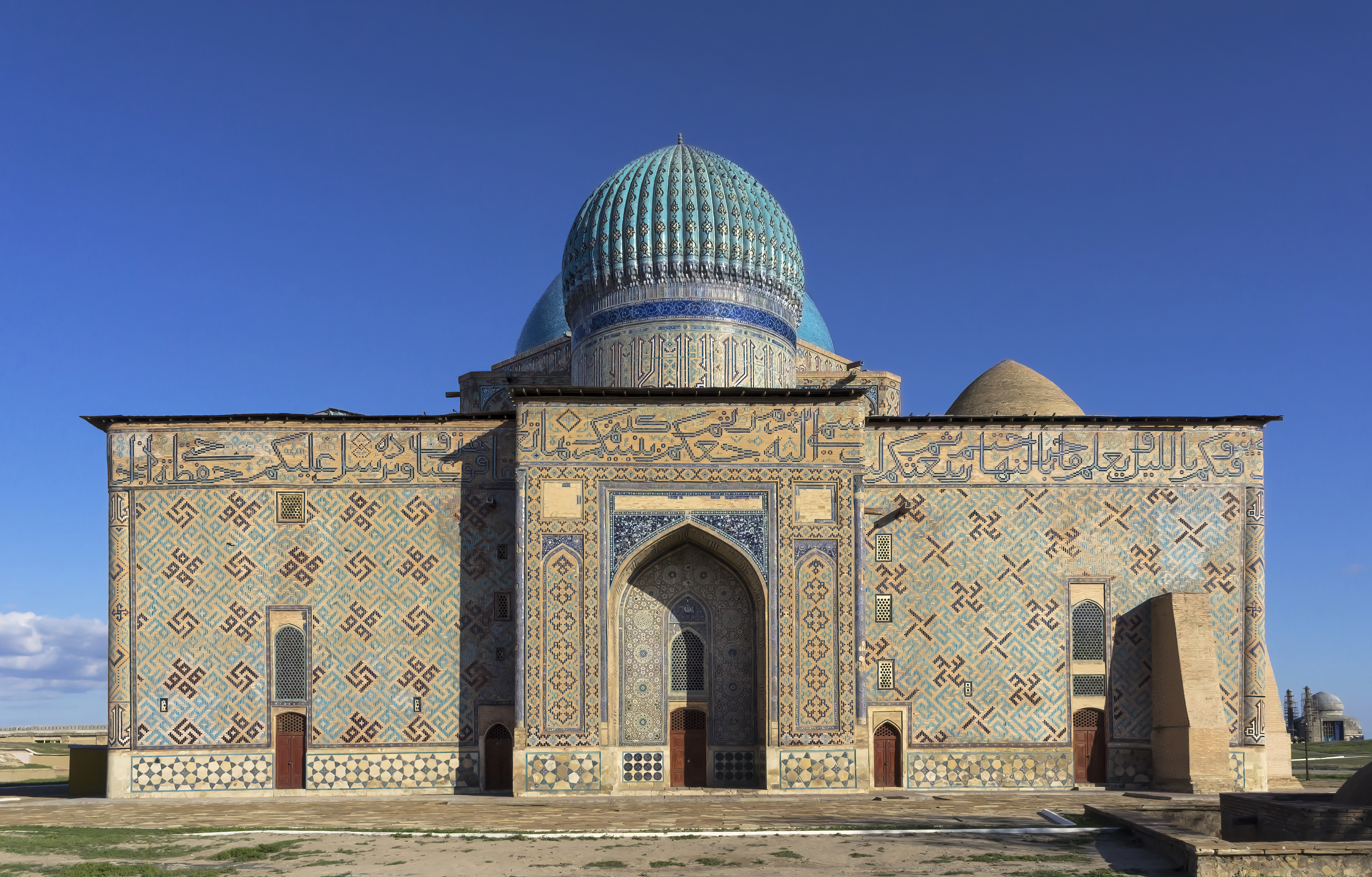
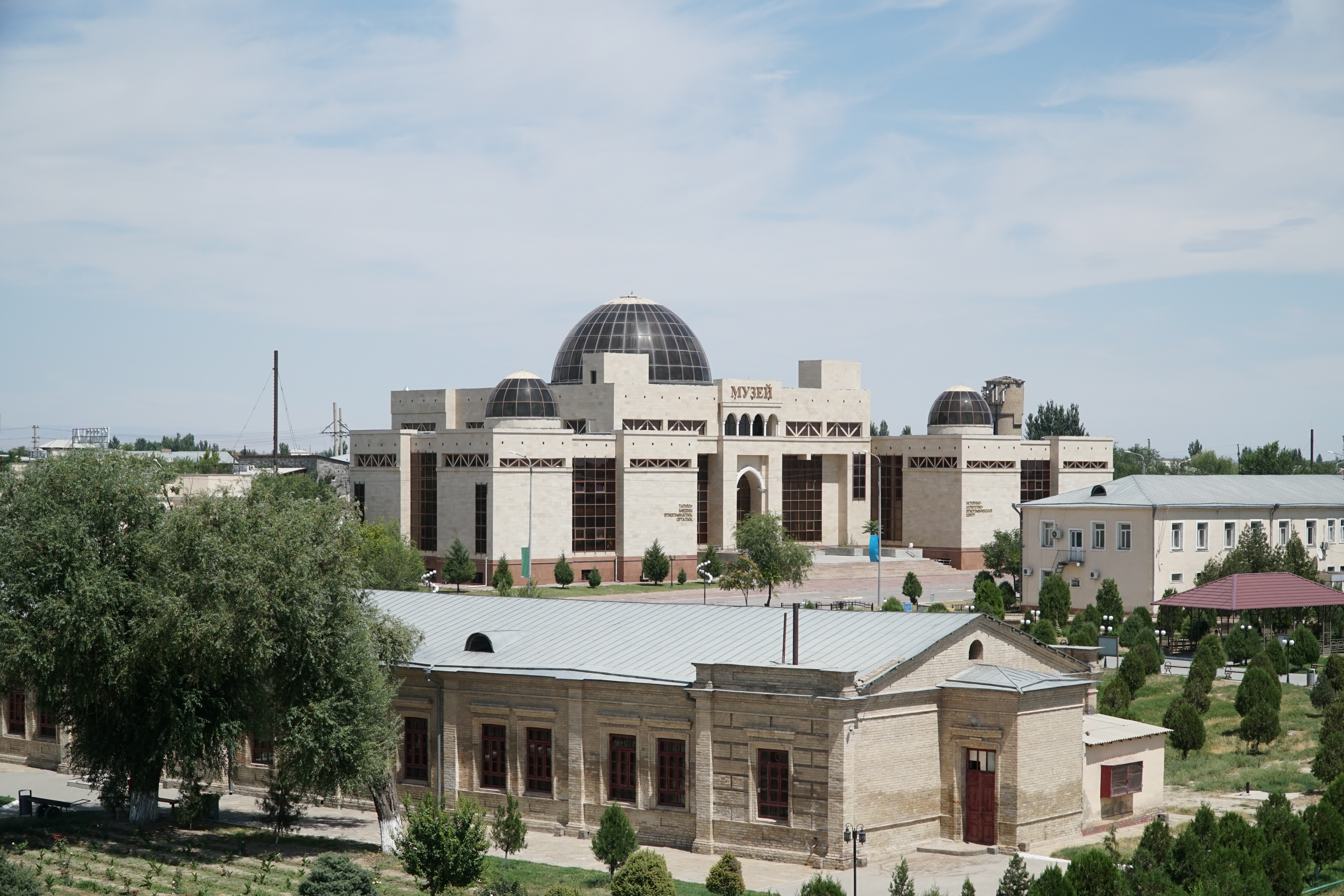
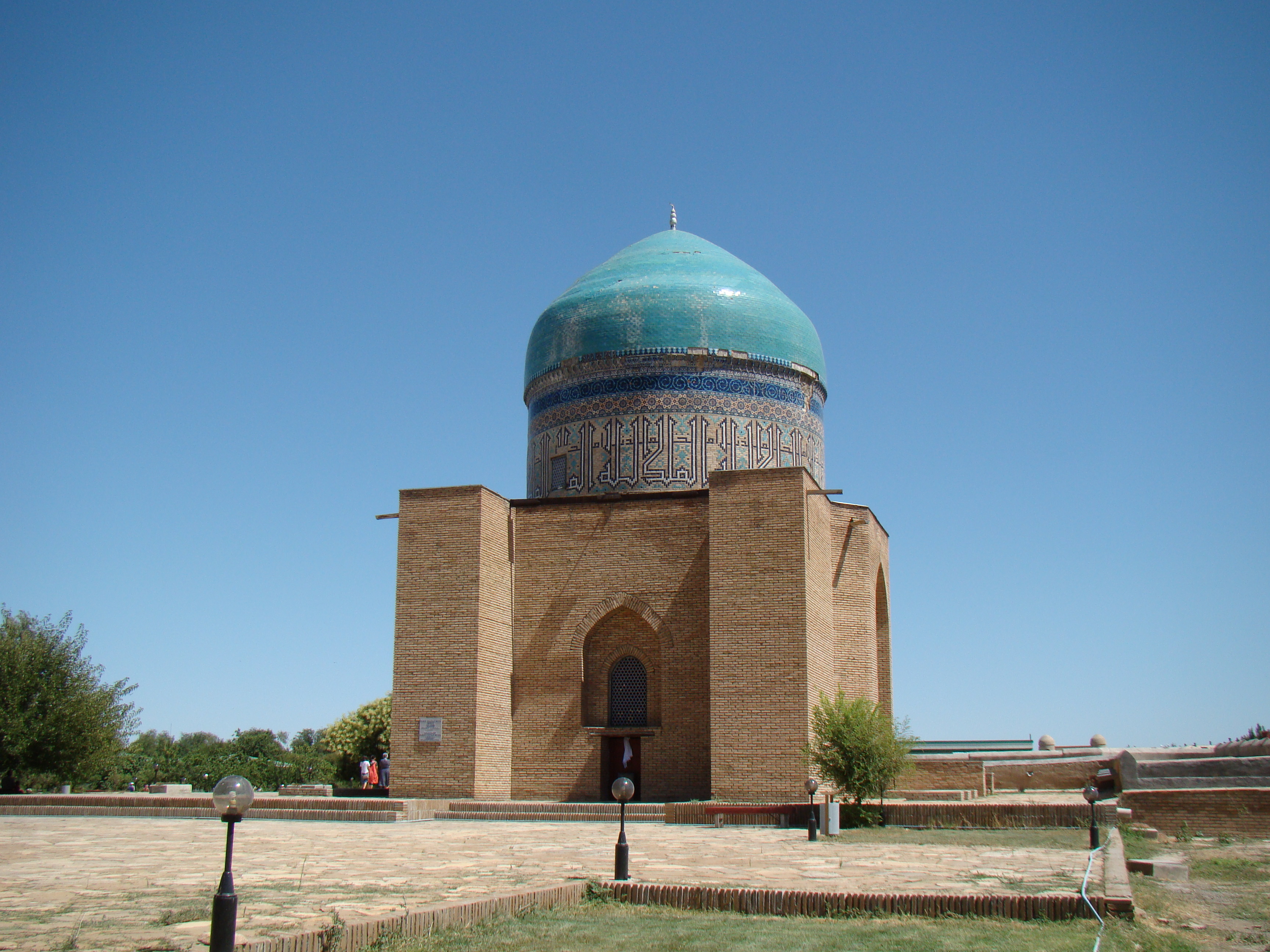
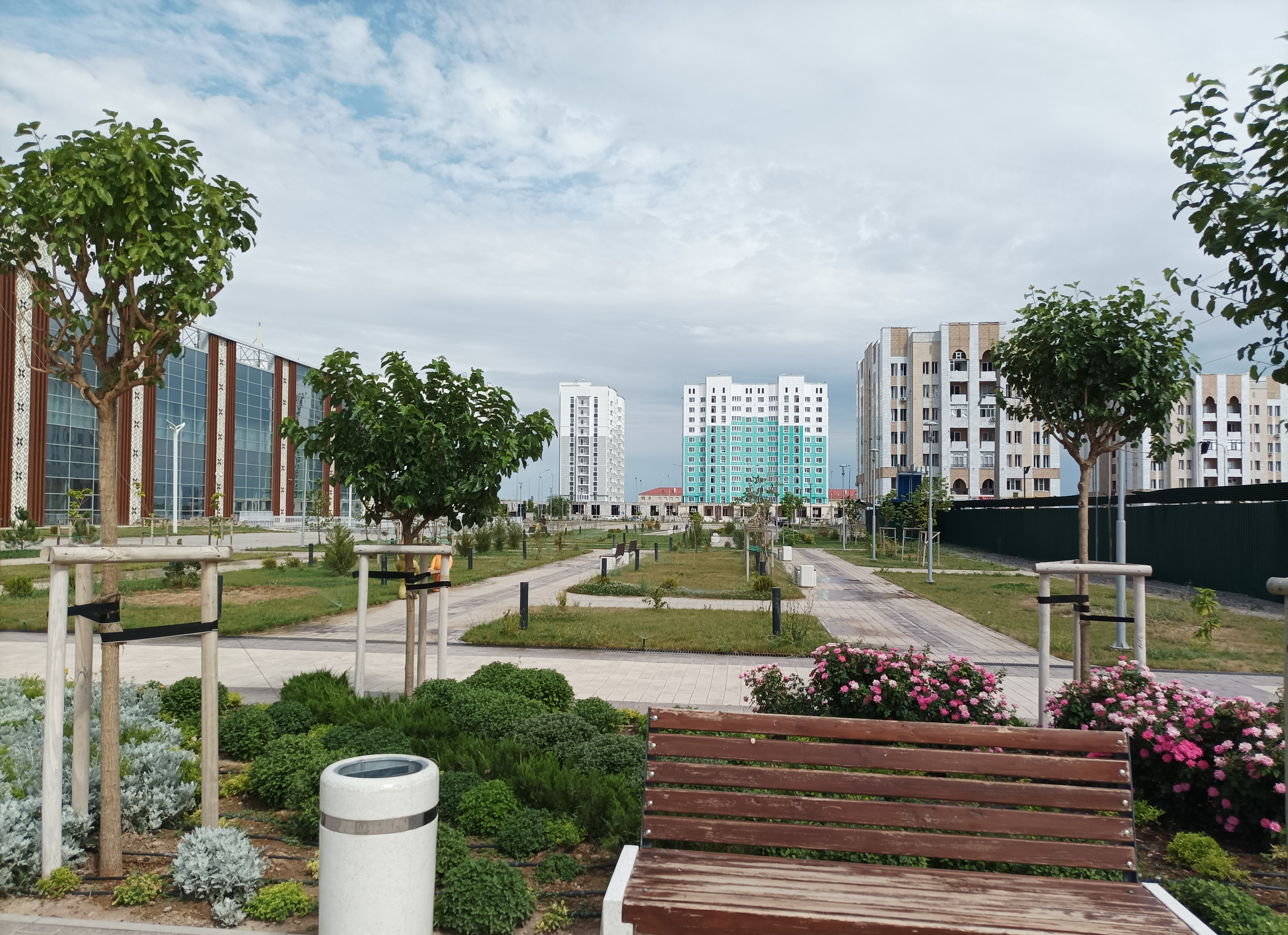
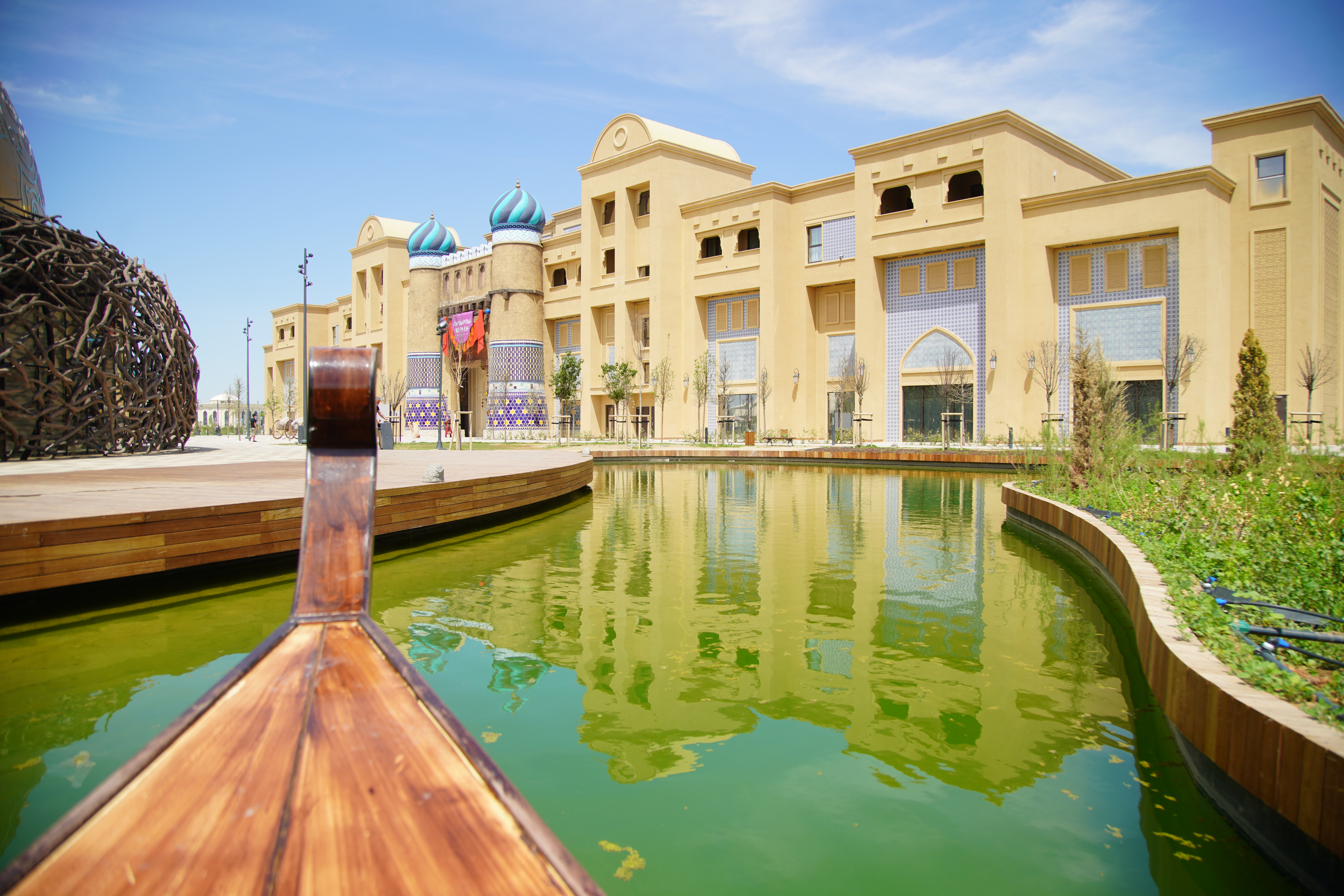
- Mausoleum of Khoja Ahmed Yasawi Historical Museum Mausoleum of Rabiya Sultan Begim City center Caravanserai

- Location in Kazakhstan
- Coordinates: 43°18′07″N 68°16′09″E
- Country: Kazakhstan
- Region: Turkistan Region

Government
  - Akim (mayor): Azimbek Pazylbekuly

Population (2023)
  - City: 300,000
  - Urban: 250,000

Turkistan (Kazakh: Түркістан / Türkıstan [tʉrkɘ̆sˈtɑn]) is a city and the administrative center of Turkistan Region of Kazakhstan, near the Syr Darya river. It is situated 160 km (100 mi) north-west of Shymkent on the Trans-Aral Railway between Kyzylorda to the north and Tashkent to the south. Its population has increased in ten years from 102,505 (1999 census results) to 142,899 (2009 census results). Turkistan's most prominent historical and cultural asset is the Mausoleum of Khoja Ahmed Yasawi, a UNESCO World Heritage Site. The city is served by Hazrat Sultan International Airport.

In 2021, Turkistan was proclaimed by the Organization of Turkic States as "Spiritual Capital of the Turkic World". In the same year, Turkistan was named as one of the top ten tourist destinations in Kazakhstan.

== Etymology ==
The modern city name of Turkistan (Kazakh: Түркістан, romanized: Türkıstan, pronounced [tʉrkɘ̆sˈtɑn]) is derived from the Turco-Persian phrase Hazrat-i-Turkistan (Chagatai and Persian: حضرت ترکستان, meaning "Saint of Turkistan"), which is in reference to Ahmad Yasawi, a prominent 11th-century poet and Sufi who was associated with and rested in this city.

Prior to Ahmad Yasawi's era, and during a significant portion of the medieval to early-modern era, the city was referred to as Iasy (Chagatai and Persian: یسی) or Shavgar (Chagatai and Persian: شاوغر).

== History ==
Turkistan, one of Kazakhstan's historic cities, has an archaeological record dating back to the 4th century.

The city emerged as a commercial hub following the decline of Otrar, an ancient city with remnants located southeast near the Syr Darya. Owing to the impact of Ahmad Yasawi, and in honor of his legacy, the city evolved into a significant hub for spiritual growth and Islamic education for the inhabitants of the Kazakh steppes. In the 1390s, Timur, the Turco-Mongol leader and the originator of the Timurid dynasty, constructed an impressive domed mazar or mausoleum over Yasawi's resting place. This structure stands as one of the most notable architectural landmarks in Kazakhstan. Until 2006, its image was featured on the reverse side of the country's banknotes.

The city also boasts other significant historical landmarks such as a medieval bath-house and four mausoleums. One of these is dedicated to Rabiya Sultan Begim, Timur's great-granddaughter, while the other three pay tribute to Kazakh khans (rulers).

Prior to the 19th-century Russian arrival, Turkistan was positioned at the boundary between the established Perso-Islamic oasis civilization of Transoxiana to its south and the vast expanse of the Kazakh steppes to its north.

Between the 16th and 18th centuries, Turkistan rose to prominence as the capital of the Kazakh Khanate, becoming the political epicenter of the Kazakh steppe. However, as the Russian Empire expanded its conquests and weakened the Kazakh Khanate, smaller southern states were overtaken. By 1864, Russian General Veryovkin had captured Turkistan for the Kokand Khanate. Subsequently, under Russian rule, it became a part of the Syr-Darya Oblast in the Governor-Generalship of Russian Turkistan. Following the collapse of the Tsarist regime between 1917-18, it briefly joined the Turkistan Autonomous Soviet Socialist Republic. By 1924, it became a part of the Kazakh ASSR within Soviet Russia.

On 19 June 2018, President Nursultan Nazarbayev publicly signed Decree No. 702, which renamed South Kazakhstan Region to Turkistan Region and designated Turkistan as its administrative centre, while Shymkent became a city of republican significance. Nazarbayev instructed that Turkistan be developed not only as the new regional administrative centre but also as a cultural and spiritual centre of the entire Turkic world.

Following its designation as the regional administrative centre, Turkistan began developing its tourism sector. Between 2018 and 2020, 257 facilities were constructed in the city, while construction began on the Caravan Saray tourist complex and the Altyn Samruk flying theatre. In 2020, construction of Hazrat Sultan International Airport was completed. During a visit to the city in May 2021, Nazarbayev stated that Turkistan was developing even faster than the capital.

On 31 March 2021, an informal summit of the Turkic Council was held at the initiative of Nazarbayev, who served as its honorary chairman. At the summit, Turkistan was proclaimed one of the spiritual capitals of the Turkic world.

=== Pilgrimage ===
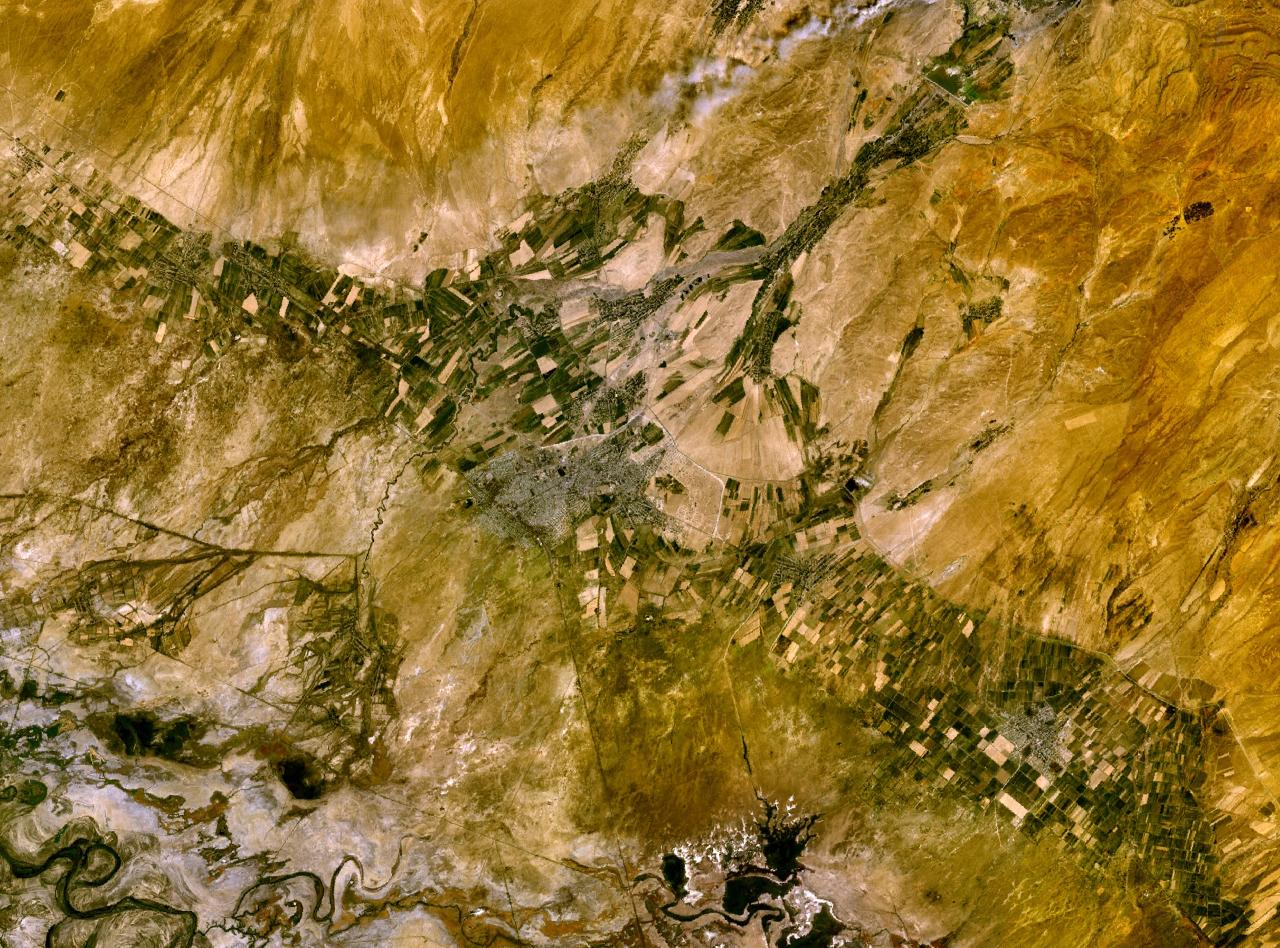
Landsat satellite photo of Turkistan

The city draws thousands of pilgrims. According to local tradition, visiting Turkistan three times is akin to a single hajj to Mecca, a sentiment echoed in other revered sites across the Muslim world. Such high regard for the Saint led to Turkistan being dubbed the Second Mecca of the East, profoundly influencing the spiritual essence of Kazakhstan's Muslim community.

== Demographics ==
Turkistan had a population of 165,000 in the 2019 census. The population rose by 10% from 1989 to 1999, making it the second fastest-growing town in Kazakhstan, after the new capital Astana.

The ethnic composition of the city:

- Kazakhs – 52.5%
- Uzbeks – 45.2%
- Other ethnic groups – 2.3%

The ethnic composition of the city according to the 1897 census:

- total – 11,253
- Uzbeks – 8,940 (79.4%)
- Kazakhs – 1,415 (12.5%)
- Tatars – 506 (4.4%)
- Russians – 312 (2.7%)

At the same time the ethnic composition of the Chimkent uyezd (Chimkent district) which included the city of Turkistan according to the 1897 census:

- total – 285,059
- Kazakhs – 224,704 (78.8%)
- Sart (non-nomadic Iranic, Turkic, or Mongolic people)– 32 043 (11.2%)
- Uzbeks – 20,709 (7.2%)
- Russians – 6 443 (2.2%)
- Tatars – 646 (0.2%)

== Tourism ==
In 2021, Keruen-Saray, Central Asia’s largest tourism complex, was opened in Turkistan. This unique attraction features merchants, artisans, an amphitheater for equestrian shows, a bazaar, hotels, restaurants, a spa and fitness center, a cinema, and a family entertainment center.

== Transport ==
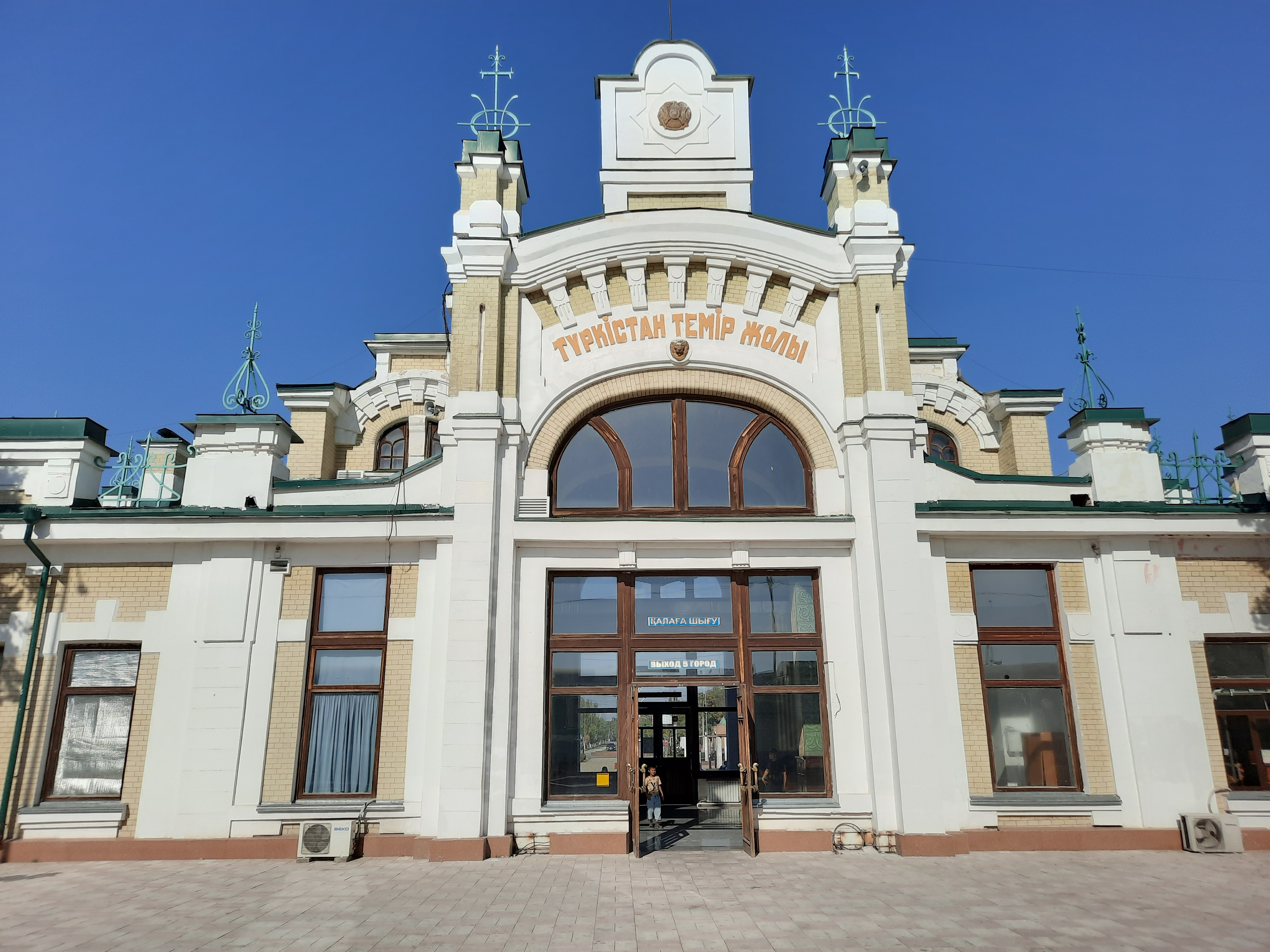
Main railway station

The city transport in Turkistan consists of buses and taxis.

Turkistan is served by Hazrat Sultan International Airport. It is located 15 km (9.3 mi) NE from the centre of city.

== Geography and climate ==
Turkistan may be reached by train from Almaty, in a journey of nearly 20 hours. The road trip from the nearest airport at Shymkent takes about two hours.

Turkistan experiences a cool semi-arid climate (Köppen BSk) with short, cold winters and long, dry, very hot summers. The vast majority of the annual precipitation falls between late autumn and late spring.

Climate data for Turkistan (1991–2020, extremes 1882–present)
Month	Jan	Feb	Mar	Apr	May	Jun	Jul	Aug	Sep	Oct	Nov	Dec	Year
Record high °C (°F)	18.7 (65.7)	26.4 (79.5)	30.7 (87.3)	36.3 (97.3)	40.5 (104.9)	46.9 (116.4)	47.9 (118.2)	46.5 (115.7)	41.9 (107.4)	35.3 (95.5)	27.9 (82.2)	21.6 (70.9)	47.9 (118.2)
Mean daily maximum °C (°F)	1.8 (35.2)	5.4 (41.7)	14.2 (57.6)	22.2 (72.0)	28.9 (84.0)	34.6 (94.3)	36.4 (97.5)	35.2 (95.4)	28.9 (84.0)	20.8 (69.4)	10.5 (50.9)	3.2 (37.8)	20.2 (68.4)
Daily mean °C (°F)	−2.9 (26.8)	−0.1 (31.8)	7.4 (45.3)	15.3 (59.5)	21.8 (71.2)	27.2 (81.0)	29.0 (84.2)	27.3 (81.1)	20.7 (69.3)	12.5 (54.5)	4.2 (39.6)	−1.7 (28.9)	13.4 (56.1)
Mean daily minimum °C (°F)	−7.0 (19.4)	−4.7 (23.5)	1.6 (34.9)	8.6 (47.5)	14.3 (57.7)	18.8 (65.8)	20.4 (68.7)	18.8 (65.8)	12.2 (54.0)	5.1 (41.2)	−1.0 (30.2)	−5.7 (21.7)	6.8 (44.2)
Record low °C (°F)	−33.6 (−28.5)	−38.6 (−37.5)	−25.0 (−13.0)	−8.4 (16.9)	−2.8 (27.0)	3.2 (37.8)	6.4 (43.5)	3.4 (38.1)	−5.5 (22.1)	−14.3 (6.3)	−31.8 (−25.2)	−33.0 (−27.4)	−38.6 (−37.5)
Average precipitation mm (inches)	25 (1.0)	26 (1.0)	31 (1.2)	23 (0.9)	21 (0.8)	8 (0.3)	4 (0.2)	2 (0.1)	2 (0.1)	12 (0.5)	26 (1.0)	26 (1.0)	207 (8.1)
Average extreme snow depth cm (inches)	4 (1.6)	2 (0.8)	0 (0)	0 (0)	0 (0)	0 (0)	0 (0)	0 (0)	0 (0)	0 (0)	0 (0)	2 (0.8)	4 (1.6)
Average precipitation days (≥ 1 mm)	5.4	5.4	4.5	4.3	3.4	1.6	0.5	0.4	0.5	2.4	4.6	4.9	37.9
Average rainy days	5	6	8	8	7	4	2	1	2	4	7	6	60
Average snowy days	7	6	2	0.3	0	0	0	0	0	0.3	2	5	23
Average relative humidity (%)	79	73	63	50	43	33	34	32	36	51	69	79	54
Mean monthly sunshine hours	138	155	199	247	337	382	401	383	315	248	167	122	3,094
Mean daily sunshine hours	4.5	5.5	6.4	8.2	10.9	12.7	12.9	12.4	10.5	8.0	5.6	3.9	8.5
Source 1: Pogodaiklimat
Source 2: NOAA (sun 1961-1990), Deutscher Wetterdienst (daily sun 1961-1990)

== Twin towns – sister cities ==
- Afyonkarahisar, Turkey
- Keçiören, Turkey
- Shusha, Azerbaijan
