= Ferghana Information Agency =

The Ferghana Information Agency is a certified Russian media outlet, serving the central Asian republics of the former Soviet Union.

The Ferghana Information Agency is notable because it employs correspondents in the major cities of all the central Asian republics of the former Soviet Union. The agency claims to be: "...one of the most popular resources dealing with the life of Central Asian countries of the former USSR."
