= Omar Abdulayev =

Guantanamo Bay detainee

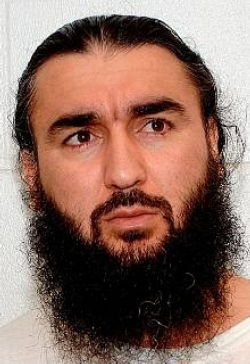
- Born: October 11, 1978 (age 48); Dushanbe, Tajik SSR, Soviet Union
- Detained at: Guantanamo
- ISN: 257
- Status: Transferred to Serbia on July 11, 2016

Omar Hamzayavich Abdulayev (Tajik: Умар Ҳамзаевич Абдуллоев; born October 11, 1978), also known as Muhammadi Davlatov, is a citizen of Tajikistan who was held in extrajudicial detention in the United States's Guantanamo Bay detention camps in Cuba. He arrived at Guantanamo on February 9, 2002.

Abdulayev was transferred to Serbia on July 11, 2016.

== Background ==
According to a profile in the Miami Herald he fled civil war in Tajikistan in 1991, when he was 13 years old.

Carol Rosenberg wrote that reviewing his files indicates he was a cooperative captive, who did not participate in the widespread hunger strikes, and that, unlike other captives, he participated in all his annual status reviews. In 2009, the Obama government decided they would no longer claim Omar was an enemy combatant. Omar is one of the Guantanamo captives who, even though he had been cleared for release, said he would rather stay in Guantanamo than be repatriated to his home country because he feared torture.

== Habeas corpus petition ==
Abdulayev had a writ of habeas corpus filed on his behalf. Resulting from arguments in his habeas petition, that he would face torture if he were repatriated, Abdulayev had a protective order, intended to protect him from repatriation. In 2008, his case was amalgamated with those of several dozen other captives, in 05-CV-2386 before US District Court Judge Reggie B. Walton.

On December 29, 2008, Allison M. Lefrak filed protected information, under seal, on his behalf.

== Transfer considerations ==
Carol Rosenberg, writing in the Miami Herald, reports that Omar Abdulayev fears being repatriated to Tajikistan, and wants to remain in Guantanamo.

Quoting Abdulayev's lawyer Matthew J. O'Hara, Rosenberg reported Abdulayev was a refugee who had fled Tajikistan to Afghanistan when he was thirteen years old. Rosenberg wrote that Abdulayev says camp authorities allowed Tajikistani security officials to meet with him, and that they told him he could be released—if he agreed to pretend to be a Muslim militant, and spy on Muslim militants in Tajikistan. She reported that the Tajikistani security officials threatened retribution when he declined to serve as a spy.

Department of Justice officials told U.S. District Court Judge Reggie Walton on June 3, 2009, that they would no longer try to defend classifying him an enemy combatant.

Abdulayev's lawyer, Matthew J. O'Hara, during a November 2009 interview on National Public Radio, that among the reasons Abdulayev fears repatriation to Tajikistan is that the family he left behind in a Pakistani refugee camp has disappeared. All efforts to contact them, following his 2001 capture, had failed.

O'Hara said Abdulayev's father died in 1994, attempting to return to Tajikistan. O'Hara said two of the other Tajikistanis received long prison terms following their repatriation.

Press reports stated a Tajik captive named "Muhammadi Davlatov" was transferred to Serbia on July 11, 2016, together with Yemeni captive Mansur Ahmad Saad al-Dayfi.
