= Turkology =

Study of the Turkic language and people

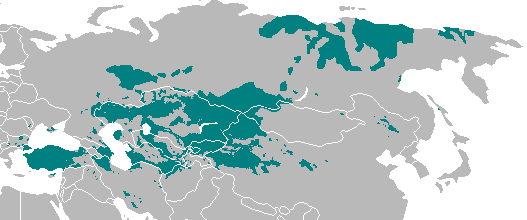
Turkic language map-present range

Turkology (or Turcology, Turkic studies or Turkish studies) is a complex of humanities sciences studying languages, history, literature, folklore, culture, and ethnology of people speaking Turkic languages and the Turkic peoples in chronological and comparative context. That includes ethnic groups from the Sakha, in eastern Siberia, to the Turks in the Balkans and the Gagauz, in Moldova.

== History ==
Ethnological information on Turkic tribes for the first time was systemized by the 11th-century Turkic philologist Mahmud al-Kashgari in the Dīwān ul-Lughat it-Turk (Dictionary of Turkic language). Multi-lingual dictionaries were compiled from the late 13th century for the practical application of participants in international trade and political life. One notable such dictionary is the Codex Cumanicus, which contains information for Cuman, Persian, Latin, and German. There are also bilingual dictionaries for Kipchak and Armenian. as well as Kipchak and Russian.

In the Middle Ages, Turkology was centered on Byzantine/Greek historians, ambassadors and travelers, and geographers. In the 15th to the 17th centuries the main subject of Turkology was the study of the Ottoman Empire, the Turkish language, and the Turkic languages of Eastern Europe and Western Asia. In 1533 a first hand-written primer appeared, and by 1612 a printed grammar by Jerome Megizer was published, followed by F. Mesgnien-Meninski's four-volume Thesaurus Linguarum Orientalium published in 1680.

Peter Simon Pallas initiated a more scientific approach to Turkology with his Comparative dictionaries of all languages and dialects (1787) which included lexical materials from Tatar, Mishar, Nogai, Bashkir, and other Turkic languages. In the 19th century, Turkology was further developed by M. A. Kazembek's Grammar of the Turkish-Tatar language (1839), O. N. Betlingk Grammar of the Yakut language (1851). A major achievement was the deciphering at the end of the 19th century of the Early Middle Age Orkhon inscriptions by V. Thomsen and W. W. Radloff (1895). By the late 19th century, Turkology had developed into a complex discipline that included linguistics, history, ethnology, archaeology, arts and literature.

In the 20th century, the Turkology complex included physical anthropology, numismatics, genetics, ancient Turkic alphabetic scripts, typology, genesis, and etymology, onomastics and toponymy. The appearance of Türkische Bibliothek (1905–1927) inaugurated specialised periodicals, followed by Mitteilungen zur Osmanischen Geschichte (1921–1926). Scientific developments allowed calibrated dating, dendrochronology, metallurgy, chemistry, textile, and other specialized disciplines, which contributed to the development of the Turkological studies. Deeper study of the ancient sources allowed better understanding of economical, social, mythological and cultural forces of the sedentary and nomadic societies. Linguistic studies uncovered preliterate symbioses and mutual influences between different peoples.

=== Turkology in Germany ===
The beginnings of modern Turkology and Turkish studies in German-speaking regions can be considered part of the broader field of Oriental studies. In Austria and Germany—especially in imperial centers like Vienna—political interest in the Turkish language led to its institutionalized study. In 1754, Maria Theresa founded the Oriental Academy (Orientalische Akademie) in Vienna, which, although not part of the university, focused heavily on Turkish and French due to political needs. One of its most famous graduates was Joseph von Hammer-Purgstall. During this early period, Turkish was usually studied alongside other Oriental languages or for practical purposes.

In Germany, the Seminary for Oriental Languages (SOS) was established in Berlin in 1887, led by Orientalist Eduard Sachau and supported by both the Prussian state and the German Empire. The institution aimed to train specialists for diplomatic and commercial roles, with Ottoman Turkish being one of the most popular languages. Notable scholars such as Friedrich Giese also taught there. However, after World War I, interest in learning Turkish declined sharply, resulting in the non-renewal of contracts for Turkish instructors at some universities. Although there was some continuity in academic careers after World War II, the influence of the philological tradition gradually weakened toward the end of the 20th century. Today, Ottoman and Turkish studies have become part of an international academic field, with English and Turkish as the main languages of scholarship. The relatively limited international recognition of German-language research is partly due to this shift.

=== Turkology in France ===
The tradition of studying the Turkish language and the history, civilization, and institutions of the Turkish and Ottoman worlds in France dates back to the 16th century. This development began during the period when diplomatic relations were established between the Kingdom of France and the Ottoman Empire. These relations encouraged the introduction of the Turkish world from the perspective of political alliance.

Two major innovations supported the early progress of these studies: the foundation of the Collège Royal (later known as Collège de France), where Turkish and Arabic languages were taught, and the collection of Ottoman manuscripts and texts in the Bibliothèque Royale (later Bibliothèque Nationale).The opening of the French Embassy in Istanbul and the establishment of consulates in major Ottoman ports further strengthened ties with the Turkish world. One important institution was the Jeunes de Langues school, founded in 1669 within the French Embassy in Istanbul. This school trained many translators and later formed the foundation of the École des Langues Orientales, founded in Paris in 1795 (today known as INALCO – National Institute for Oriental Languages and Civilizations).

In the 19th century, as knowledge about the Turkish world increased, scientific research in Oriental and Turkic studies began to develop. After World War II, the death of Paul Pelliot in 1945 and the retirement of Jean Deny in 1949 marked the beginning of a new generation of Turkologists. In 1950, the École Pratique des Hautes Études in Paris established a department for Turkish History and Philology, led by Louis Bazin. In 1961, a Chair of Turkish Language and Civilization was founded at the Faculty of Letters in Aix-en-Provence, headed by Robert Mantran. A similar department was created at the University of Strasbourg in 1962, first led by René Giraud and later by Irène Mélikoff. Around these academic centers, research groups were formed with the financial and institutional support of French universities and the Centre National de la Recherche Scientifique (CNRS). Louis Bazin, in particular, led research in Paris on pre-Islamic Turkish history and Turkic inscriptions.

=== Persecution in Soviet Russia ===
On 9 August 1944, the Central Committee of the Soviet Communist Party, published an edict prohibiting "ancientization" of Turkic history. The edict was followed by a consecutive wave of mass arrests, imprisoning and killing of the Turkology intelligentsia, massive creation of replacement scientists, and rewriting of history pages on an industrial scale.

Many Turkology scholars in the Soviet Union were persecuted or imprisoned by Joseph Stalin's political oppression movement, the Great Purge, during the 1930s and the 1940s, on the basis of disputed Islamic writings and publications. Other cultural Scholars, such as Egyptologists and Japanologists were also subject to the political repression, in Stalin's movement to cleanse Communist Russia of ethnic minorities that posed opposition to Communism.

Most Oriental and other cultural scholars that had been repressed in the 1930s and 1940s, as well as their respective scientific works, were, however, officially rehabilitated in or after 1956.

On the other hand, the edict brought unintended benefits to Turkology. One was the nearly immediate linguistic development of an alternate lexicon, which replaced the nouns and adjectives containing the word Türk by a wealth of euphemisms: "nomads, Siberians, Paleosiberians, Middle Asians, Scythians, Altaians, Tuvians", etc. that filled scientific publications. The other was "writing into a drawer", when results of the years of fruitful work were written down for future publication. When the bonds relaxed, the publications exploded. Another was a flight of scientists from European Russia into remote areas, which brought first class scientists to many intellectually starved outlying areas of Central Asia. Another one was connected with the statewide efforts to re-invent the history, when a wealth of Turkological facts were found in the process of search for "correct" history. And another one was a built-up of the public interest for the forbidden subjects, that resulted that no print size could satisfy the demand. L.N.Gumilev and O.Suleimenov inflamed a surge in the new generation of Turkology scholars.

With the physical culling of the scholars from the society, an organized a total extermination of all their published and unpublished works took place concurrently. Their books were removed from the libraries and destroyed from private collections by an intimidated population, articles and publications were culled, published photographs were retouched, private photographs were destroyed, published scientific references were erased, and publications with undesired references were destroyed. Very few of the early 20th century expedition diaries, ethnographical notes, reports and drafts for publications were ever recovered.

=== Turkology scholars persecuted in 20th-century Soviet Union ===
Abdrahimov Ali Rahim (Ali Shakirovich, 1892–1943)	Turkologist, scientist, literary critic, writer, docent of Eastern Pedagogical Institute in Kazan. Was arrested and incarcerated (dates unknown). After serving the term of the sentence A.Abdrahimov returned to Kazan, and was arrested again and sentenced to 10 years of hard labor in concentration camp
Ayvazov Asan Sabri (1878–1938)	A Crimean, scientist, journalist, translator, teacher, editor of Tatar newspapers, member of "Kurultai". Served as an envoy of Regional Government to Turkey. Persecuted by Crimean ASSR People's Commissariat for Internal Affairs (NKVD) for participation in "nationalist counterrevolutionary organization", shot to death in Simferopol
Aqçoqraqlı Osman Nuri-Asan oğlu (1878–1938)	Historian, writer, teacher, journalist, archaeologist, in 1917 elected a "Kurultai" delegate, was shot to death in Simferopol
Akhatov Gabdulkhay Khuramovich (1927–1986)	Scientist, professor of philology (1970), Turkologist, public figure, founder of modern Tatar dialectology and creator of the Kazan 'school of phraseology, the author of fundamental scientific works and textbooks (Tatarstan, Russia, Soviet Union)
Asfendiarov Sanjar Jafarovich (1889–1938)	Turkologist, Rector of the Moscow Oriental Studies Institute. Shot to death
Baiburtly Yagya Nadji Suleiman (1876–1943)	Principal in Türkic school in Bakhchysarai, journalist, delegate of regional "Kurultai" (1917), persecuted by NKVD of Crimean ASSR for participation in "nationalist counterrevolutionary organization", shot to death in Arkhangelsk imprisonment
Baytusyn Akhmet (1873–1937)	Scientist, public figure, member of Russian Parliament (1905–06), Kazakh free thinker, first researcher of Kazakh epos and folklore, author of alphabet textbook, phonetics and syntax rules, etymology of Kazakh language, was sentenced to death in 1931, spent years in concentration camps, freed in 1935 after petition of M.Gorky's wife, re-arrested and shot to death in 1937
Baryi Battal-Taimas (Saetbattalov Gabdelbaryi, 1883–1969)	Historian, literary critic, publicist, editor of newspaper "Altai" (1918). Arrested, incarcerated, in 1921 escaped from a Soviet concentration camp and fled abroad. Buried in Istanbul
Bertels Eugene Edwardovich (1890–1957)	Iranist and Turkologist, corresponding member of USSR Academy of Sciences (1939), a member academician of Tehran Academy (Iran, 1944), Ashgabat Academy (Turkmenistan, 1951), Damascus Academy (Syria, 1951), staff member of Asian Museum, Art History Institute, Leningrad State University, and Leningrad Institute of Eastern Languages. He was arrested three times, in 1922, then in 1925 as a "French spy", and again in 1941 as a "German spy", but survived to tell his story.
Bodaninsky Usein Abdrefi (1877–1938)	Ethnographer, artist, critic. From 1917 Bodaninsky was a director of the Bakhchysarai museum, he was an organizer of ethnographical and archaeological expeditions. Shot to death in Simferopol
Cherman Timofei Pavlovich (?)	Economist, historian, bibliographer, expert on Turkey. Was incarcerated, details unknown
Choban-zade Bekir Vagap ogly (1893–1937)	Outstanding Soviet Turkologist. A Crimean Tatar, a son of a peasant, a graduate of Budapest University, a Dean in University. Active participant in Stalinist "language construction", from 1924 worked in Baku. In 1937 arrested (like Alexander Samoylovich, arrested in Kislovodsk, but several months earlier) and shot to death. Biography see F.D.Ashnin "Bekir Choban-zade Vagap"/Peoples of Asia and Africa, 1967, No 1, p. 208.
Cholpan (1897–1937)	Uzbek writer and scientist. Killed in Stalinist persecutions
A. A. Divay (1855–1933)	Bashkir field collector, Inspector, collector
Fielstrup Feodor Arturovich (1889–?)	Turkologist – ethnographer. Ethnographic department of Russian Museum, employee in "Commission for Study of Tribal Composition of Russia's Population and neighboring Countries". Arrested ca. 1933, died during interrogations
Gubaidullin Gaziz (Gabdulgaziz Salihovich, 1887–1937)	Historian, professor (1927) in Azerbaijan University. Arrested and shot to death
Hakim Nigmat (?)	Turkologist, linguist. Docent of Tatar language faculty in Kazan Pedagogical Institute. Arrested in 1936 and perished without a trace
Huluflu Veli (?)	Historian of the literature. Director of Azarbaijan SSR Language, Literature and Arts Institute, head of the arts sector in Azerbaijan branch of USSR Academy of Sciences (1934–1937). Arrested in 1937 and perished without a trace
Keyekbaev Jalil Giniyatovich (1911–1968)	Turkologist, linguist.Professor of Bashkir language faculty in Bashkir State University. The founder of the modern school of Bashkir linguistics. He proved the kinship of Turkic and Ural-Altai languages
Kudoyarov Galyautdin Gainutdinovich (189I-1966)	Publicist, teacher, Tatarstan ASSR Narkom (People's Commissar) of Education (1931). Was persecuted twice (details unknown)
Khudyakov Michael Georgievich (1894–1936)	Archaeologist, researcher of history and culture of Volga region peoples. Institute for Study of USSR Peoples (Leningrad), docent in Leningrad State Historico-Linguistical Institute, USSR Academy State Institute of History of Material Culture. Arrested and executed in 1936
Latynin Boris Alexandrovich (1899–1967)	Archaeologist, ethnographer, scholar on cultures of Central Asia and Volga region peoples. Arrested in 1935, lost leg in incarceration, released in 40es, subsequently worked in Hermitage
Leibovich Eugene Solomon (?)	Archaeologist and ethnographer (peoples of Volga region and Urals). Arrested in 1936 and vanished
Mansurov Gasim Gatievich (1894–1955)	Historian, lecturer, in 1920es worked for state government in Kazan, then scientific work in Moscow, author of two monographs on problems of Tatar revolutionary movement. Was persecuted (details unknown), after release lived in Murom
Martinovich Nikolai Nikolaevich (1883–1939)	Turkologist-ethnographer and specialist in folklore. Professor, lecturer in Petrograd University, associate in Russian Museum, was arrested in 1920 and in 1921, in 1922 fled to exile
Miller Alexander Alexandrovich (1875–1937)	Caucasologist, ethnographer, archaeologist, linguist, expert on prehistoric art, professor of archaeology, professor of Georgian language, head of ethnographical department in Russian Museum. Arrested in 1933, exiled to Tashkent, arrested again in 1937 and believed to have died in the Tashkent prison
Mirbaba ogly Usif Vesir (Chemenzemenly) (1887–1943)	Azerbaijan writer, historian of the literature and specialist in folklore. Arrested in 1937 and perished without a trace
Mukhamedzhan Tynyshpaev (1879–1937?)	Kazakh railroad engineer, activist, historian, member of the Alash Orda, sentenced to prison in 1937 and was eventually executed in Tashkent
Novichev Aron Davydovich (1902–1987) (family name Rabinovic)	Turkologist, PhD in history, professor of Leningrad University. From 1932 to 1937 worked in Institute of Oriental Studies of the USSR Academy of Sciences, scientific secretary of Turkologists' Association. Arrested in 1937, exiled until 1940. Subsequently, worked in Oriental Institute and Leningrad University
Odabash (Temirdjan) Abibulla Abdureshid (1891 – 1938?)	Lecturer in the Crimean Pedagogical Institute, delegate of "Kurultai", editor of "Eshil ada" and "Bilgi" magazines. Odabash was arrested in 1928 and vanished
Polivanov Eugene Dmitrievich (1891–1938)	Linguist-Orientalist (Japanese, Chinese, Dungan, Korean, Turkic and other languages), theorist in linguistics. In 1915–1921 professor in Petrograd University, in 1917–1918 E.Polivanov headed Foreign Ministry Oriental Relations department, in 1921–1926 he worked for state apparatus and taught in Tashkent University, in 1926–1929 in Moscow, in 1929–1934 in Samarkand (1929–1931), Tashkent (1931–1934), in 1934–1937 in Kirgiz Scientific Research Institute of Kirgiz Language and Writing (Frunze) and Frunze Pedagogical Institute. Arrested in 1937, declared to be a Japanese spy, shot to death in 1938 in Moscow
Radloff Fridrich Wilhelm (Radlov Vasily Vasilievich, 1837–1918)	Outstanding Turkologist, graduated Berlin University, from 1858 worked in Russia, Academician of the Russian Academy of Sciences, teacher of Alexander Samoylovich. Stalinists' proclaiming an ethnically German Radlov a "Pantürkist" was especially ridiculous
Rudenko Sergey Ivanovich (1885–1969)	Archaeologist and ethnographer, worked in Transbaikalia, Altai, Kazakhstan and Bashkiria, professor in Petrograd University, head of ethnographical department in Russian Museum, scientific secretary of state "Commission for Study of Tribal Composition of Russia's Population and neighboring Countries". Arrested in 1931 and sentenced to 10 years in BelBaltlLag concentration camp. Transferred in 1934 to forced labor in Belomor-Baltic Canal Combine as a hydrologist. Returned to archaeology in 1945, in 1947–1954 headed excavations of famous Scythian time Pazyryk kurgans in the Altai Mountains
Rykov Paul Sergeevich (1884–1942)	Archaeologist, worked in Volga and Kazakhstan regions for USSR State Academy Institute of History of Material Culture. Fell under Stalinist persecution in 1938 and perished without a trace.
Sagidov Karim Muhamet (1888–1939)	Turkologist, Iranist. From 1934 in Historical-Archaeological Institute (History Institute), Oriental Institute of the USSR Academy of Sciences. Arrested in 1936, in 1936 "Special Commission" of Leningrad Provincial Court sentenced him to 5 years of hard labor in a Far Eastern concentration camp by infamous Article 58, in 1939 he was released because of poor health, and died on the way home
Saifi Fatyh Kameletdin (?)	Turkologist-historian, a senior lecturer of Kazan (East) Pedagogical Institute. Arrested in 1936 and perished without a trace
Samoylovich Alexander Nikolaevich (1880–1938)	Turkologist, academician of the USSR Academy of Sciences, in 1934–1937 director of Oriental Institute. Arrested in 1937, shot to death in 1938
Sharaf Galimdyan Sharafutdinovich (1896–1950)	Scientist-linguist, political figure of national movement. Was arrested and persecuted
Schmidt Alexey Viktorovich (1884 or 1885–1935)	Archaeologist (Volga region, Kama, Ural) and Africanist ethnographer. USSR Academy State Institute of History of Material Culture, head of Africa department of USSR Academy of Sciences Anthropology and Ethnography Institute. Arrested in 1933 ("Russian Museum Case"), died in 1935 during NKVD interrogations
Serov Anton Mikhailovich (?)	Turkologist student. Arrested in 1949, imprisoned until general amnesty to the victims of Stalinist persecutions in the middle of the 50es
Sheikhzade Maksud (1908–1967)	Azerbaijani, then Uzbek writer, translator, literary critic. In the end of 1920es exiled from Azerbaijan to Uzbekistan as "nationalist" (stood up for preservation of his national culture and language). Arrested again in 1951, imprisoned until general amnesty to the victims of Stalinist persecutions in the middle of the 50es, freed in the middle of 1950es
Shteinberg Lev (Haim) Yakovlevich (1861–1927)	Ethnographer, expert on peoples of Siberia and North. Worked in USSR Academy of Sciences Anthropology and Ethnography Institute, corresponding member of USSR Academy of Sciences. Arrested in 1921, freed after petition of M.Gorky
Sidorov Alexey (?)	Student of Oriental department in Leningrad State University, major Turkologist – linguist. Arrested in 1949, imprisoned until general amnesty to the victims of Stalinist persecutions in 1956, mentally sick at release, committed suicide
Sultan-Galiev Mirsaid Haidargalievich (1892–1940)	One of outstanding organizers of Tatarstan state, member of Narkomnats (People's Commissariate for Nationalities) Board. The largest case fabricated by NKVD was connected with Sultan-Galiev's name, a "sultangaleevshchina" in Stalinist lingo, for targeted destruction of the national educated layer in the Turkic republics of the former USSR. M.Sultan-Galiev was arrested and shot to death
Talanov Nikolai Georgievich (1897–1938)	Historian of Central Asia, Turkologist. Secretary of Leningrad Oriental Institute, Oriental Institute in 1931–1933, from 1935 director of Ethnography Museum. Arrested in 1937, Article 58–10, 2nd field session of the USSR Supreme Court sentenced him in 1938 to the highest measure of punishment, on the same day shot to death in Leningrad
Tchernyshev Eugeny Ivanovich (1894–?)	Historian of Tataria. Docent of Kazan Pedagogical Institute. Arrested in 1936 and perished without a trace
Teploukhov Sergey Alexandrovich (1888–1934?)	Archaeologist, ethnographer of Siberia. Worked in USSR State Institute of History of Material Culture, Russian Museum, as a senior lecturer in Leningrad State University. Arrested in 1934, in prison committed suicide
Tsedenishe (?)	Mongoloigist. Lecturer in Leningrad Oriental Institute. Arrested in 1936 or 1937 and perished without a trace
Tsintsius Vera Ivanovna (1903–1981)	Expert on Tungus-Manchurian languages, worked in Northern Peoples Institute. Arrested in 1936, was imprisoned from 1937 to 1940. After the WWII she worked in Linguistic Institute in Leningrad
Tsovikian Horem Mkrt (1900–1942)	Ethnically Armenian Turkologist and historian. Docent of Leningrad Oriental Institute, researcher in Oriental Institute. Arrested in 1938, incarcerated in local jail of the Leningrad People's Commissariat of Internal Affairs until his release in August 1939. Died during WWII blockade of Leningrad
Ukhtomsky Alexander Alekseevich, prince, bishop with chosen name Andrey, (1872–1937)	Chairman of Eastern Russian cultural educational society, bishop of Ufa and Menzelinsky from 1913, founder of magazine "Beyond-Volga chronist", member of the Most Holy Synod (1917), was arrested numerous times, shot to death under decision of NKVD "troyka" of Yaroslavl province.
Umnyakov Ivan Ivanovich (1890–1976)	Historian, archaeologist, scholar on W. W. Bartold's works. Arrested at the end of 1920es or early 1930es. Is known to spend the first half of 1930es in Arkhangelsk exile. Survived persecutions of the Stalinist period
Vahidov Said Gabdulmannan (1887–1937)	Archaeograph scientist, historian. Arrested, persecuted, and shot to death
Validi-Togan Zaki (Validov Ahmetzaki Ahmetshakhovich, 1890–1970)	Historian, Turkologist, academician, political figure, head of the first government of Bashkiria (1918). To avoid capture and persecution fled to Turkey.
Vasmer Richard Wilhelm George (Roman Romanovich, Richard Richardovich) (1888–1938)	Orientalist in Arabic, Persian, and Turkic, Semitic, Hebrew, and Syriac. Headed Hermitage department of Eastern Coins. Arrested in 1936, died in exile (after concentration camp) in Tashkent
Zabirov Vali Abdurahman (1897–1937)	A Tatar scientist, Turkologist, post-graduate student of Oriental Studies Institute of USSR Academy of Sciences, a lecturer in Leningrad Oriental Institute. Arrested in 1936, shot to death in Solovki in 1937
Ahatanhel Krymsky (1871–1942)	A Ukrainian-Tatar Orientalist, linguist and polyglot, literary scholar, folklorist, writer, and translator. Krymsky contributed about hundred entries to the Brockhaus, Efron, and Granat encyclopedias and wrote many other works on Arabic, Turkish, Turkic, Crimean Tatar, and Iranian history and literature, some of which were pioneering textbooks in Russian Oriental studies. Among others, he wrote histories of Turkey and their literature; monographs on Hafiz and his songs and on the Turkic peoples, their languages, and literatures; and edited a collection of articles on the Crimean Tatars. In July 1941, the NKVD imprisoned him in Kostanay General Prison, where he died.

- Я. В. Васильков, М. Ю. Сорокина (eds.), Люди и судьбы. Биобиблиографический словарь востоковедов – жертв политического террора в советский период (1917–1991) ("People and Destiny. Bio-Bibliographic Dictionary of Orientalists – Victims of the political terror during the Soviet period (1917–1991)"), Петербургское Востоковедение (2003). online edition
- Д.Д.Тумаркин (ed.), Репрессированные Этнографы, Вып. 1, М., Вост. лит., 2002 (Tumarkin D.D., "Prosecuted Ethnographers", Issue 1, Moscow, Oriental Literature, 2002)
- Tallgren A.M., 1936. Archaeological studies in Soviet Russia // Eurasia septentrionalis antiqua. X.
- А.А.Формозов, Русские археологи и политические репрессии 1920-1940-х гг. Институт археологии РАН, Москва, 1998 (Formozov A.A., "Russian archaeologists and political repressions of the 1920-1940's", Institute of Archaeology of the Russian Academy of Sciences, Moscow, 1998)

== List of Turkologists ==
- Abramzon, S. M. (1905–1977) (ethnographer)
- Abu al-Ghazi Bahadur (1605–1664) (historian, Turkologist)
- Adamovic M. (Uralic languages, Turkologist)
- Akhatov G. Kh. (1927–1986) (Professor of Philology, Turkologist, Linguist, Orientalist)
- Ahatanhel Krymsky (1871–1942) (Orientalist, Historian, Linguist, Philologist, Ethnographer
- Ahinjanov S. M. (1939–1991) (archaeologist, historian, Turkologist)
- Akishev, K. A. (1924–2003) (archaeologist, historian, investigated Issyk Kurgan)
- Altheim, F. (1898–1976) (historian)
- Amanjolov, A. S. (1934-2012) (runiform writing)
- Anokhin, A. V. (1867–1931) (Turkologist, ethnographer, ancient musical arts)
- Aristov, N. A. (1847–1903) (Orientalist)
- Artamonov, M. (1898–1972) (Archaeologist, Turkologist, historian, Khazar studies)
- Asmussen, J. P. (1928–2002), (Orientalist, Manichaeism historian)
- Bacot, J. (1877–1965) (Orientalist)
- Baichorov S. Ya. (Turkologist, philologist, runiform writing)
- Bailey, H. W. (1899–1996) (Orientalist)
- Bang W. (Bang Kaup J. W., J. Kaup) (1869–1934) (Turkologist, linguist)
- Barfield T. J. (history, anthropology, and social theory)
- Bartold, W. W. (1869–1930) (Orientalist)
- Baskakov, N. A. (1905–1995) (Turkologist, linguist, ethnologist)
- Batmanov I. A. (Turkologist, philologist, runiform writing)
- Bazin Louis (1920-2011) (Sinologist, orientalist)
- Beckwith, C. (Uralic and Altaic Studies)
- Benzing J. (1913–2001) (Turkic and northern Eurasia languages)
- Bichurin, N. Ya. (1777–1853) (Sinologist, orientalist)
- Bidjiev Kh. Kh.-M. (1939–1999) (archaeologist, Turkologist)
- Bosworth, C. E. (1928-2015) (Orientalist, Arabist)
- Bretschneider, E. (1833–1901) (Sinologist)
- Budberg, P. A. (Boodberg) (1903–1972) (Sinologist, orientalist)
- Çağatay, Saadet (1907-1989)
- Castrén, M. A. (1813–1852)
- Chavannes, E. (1865–1918) (Sinologist)
- Chia-sheng, Feng (Jiasheng, Fen Tszia-shen, C. S. Feng)
- Csirkés, Ferenc Péter (Orientalist)
- Clauson, G. (1891–1974) (Orientalist, Turkish language)
- Čaušević, Ekrem (Turkologist)
- de Guignes, Joseph (1721–1800) (Orientalist)
- Dal, Vladimir (1801–1872, Russian language lexicographer)
- Dilaçar, Agop (1895–1979) (linguist)
- Doblhofer E. (Historical philology,)
- Doerfer, G. (1920–2003) (Turkologist)
- Dolgih B. O. (1904–1971) (historian, ethnographer-Sibirologist)
- Donner, O. (1835–1909) (linguist)
- Drompp M. R. (Orientalist, Turkologist)
- Dybo, A. V. (Philologist, Turkologist, comparative linguist)
- Eberhard Wolfram (1909–1988) (Sinologist, Philologist, Turkologist)
- Erdal Marcel (linguist)
- Eren, H. (1919–2007) (linguist, Turkologist, Hungarologist )
- Fedorov-Davydov, G. A. (1931–2000) (archaeologist)
- Frye, R. N. (1920-2014) (philologist, historian)
- von Gabain, A. (1901–1993) (Turkologist, Sinologist, linguist, art historian)
- Gasratjan, M. A. (1924–2007) (historian, Turkologist, Kurdologist)
- Geng Shimin 耿世民 (Turkologist, Uighurologist, Manichaeanism, linguist, archaeologist, historian)
- Gibbon, E. (1737–1794) (historian)
- Giraud, M. R. (1904–1968) (philologist, historian)
- Gökalp, Z. (1886–1924) (Sociologist)
- Golden, P. (historian)
- Golubovsky P. V. (1857–1907) (historian)
- de Groot, J. J. M. (1854–1921) (Sinologist)
- Grousset, R. (1885–1952)
- Gumilev, L. (Arslan) (1912–1992)
- Halasi-Kun Tibor (1914–1991) (Turkologist)
- Gustav Haloun (1898–1951)
- Hamilton, J. R. (linguist, Uighur and Chigil studies)
- Harmatta, J. (1917–2004) (linguist)
- Hashimoto Mantaro (1932－1987) (linguist, philologist, Sinologist; the influence of Altaic languages on Mandarin Chinese)
- Hazai, György (Turkologist, linguist)
- Heissig, W. (1913–2005) (Mongolist)
- Henning, W. B. (1908–1967)
- von Herberstein, S. (Siegmund, Sigismund, Freiherr von Herberstein, Gerbershtein) (1486–1566) (historian, writer, diplomat)
- Hirth, F. (1845–1927) (Sinologist)
- Howorth, H. H. (1842–1923) (archaeologist, historian)
- Hulsewe, A. F. P. (1910–1993) (Sinologist)
- Ismagulov, Orazak (anthropologist)
- Jalairi Kadir Galy (Djalairi, Kadyrali, Kadyr Ali, Kydyrgali) (ca 1620) (historian)
- Jankowski Henryk (turkologist)
- Jarring, G. (1907–2002) (Turkologist)
- Jdanko, T. (Zhdanko) (ethnographer)
- Johanson, L. (Turkologist)
- Kantemir, D. (Cantemir) (1673–1723) (historian, linguist, ethnographer)
- Khalikov, A. Kh. (1929–1994) (archaeologist, historian, Turkologist)
- Khazanov, A. (social anthropologist and ethnologist)
- Kitsikis, Dimitri (1935-2021) (political science)
- Klaproth, J. (1783–1835), (Orientalist, Linguist, Historian, Ethnographer)
- Köprülü, M. F. (Koprulu) (1890–1966)
- Korkmaz, Zeynep (1921-2025) (Dialectologist)
- Kormushin, I. V. (Turkologist, philologist, runiform writing)
- Kotwicz, W. (1872–1944) (Orientalist)
- Kradin, N. N. (anthropologist, archaeologist)
- Küner, N. V. (1877–1955) (17-languages polyglot, Turkologist)
- Kurat, A. N. (historian) (1903–1971)
- Kvaerne, P. (Tibetology, Religions)
- Kyzlasov, I. L. (Turkologist, runiform writing)
- Lagashov, B. R. (Caucasology, philology)
- Laude-Cirtautas, Ilse (Turkology)
- von Le Coq, A. (1860–1930) (archaeologist, explorer)
- Liu Mau-tsai (Liu Guan-ying) (Sinologist, Turkologist)
- Lubotsky, A. (philologist)
- Maenchen-Helfen, O. J. (1894–1969) (academic, sinologist, historian, author, and traveler)
- Malov, S. E. (1880–1957) (Orientalist, runiform writing)
- Marquart, J. (Markwart) (1864–1930)
- McGovern W. M. (1897–1964) (Orientalist)
- Mélikoff, Irène (1917-2009)
- Ménage, V. L. (1920–2015) (British turkologist, historian)
- Mészáros, Gyula (1883–1957) (Hungarian ethnographer, Orientalist, Turkologist)
- Minorsky, V. F. (1877–1966) (Orientalist)
- Moravcsik, Gyula (1892–1972) (Byzantinology)
- Mukhamadiev, A. (Numismatist, orientalist, philologist)
- Müller, G. F. (Miller) (1705–83) (father of ethnography)
- Munkacsi, B. (1860–1937) (linguist)
- Nadelyaev, V. M. (Turkologist, philologist, runiform writing)
- Nasilov, D. M. (Turkologist, philologist)
- Németh, Gyula (1890–1976) (Turkologist, linguist)
- Ogel, B. (1923–1989) (Philology)
- Pallas, P. S. (1741–1811) (naturalist, ethnographer)
- Pelliot, P. (1878–1945) (Sinologist)
- Pletneva, S. A. (archaeologist)
- Podolak, Barbara (Turkologist, linguist)
- Polivanov, E. D. (1891–1938) (Founder of Altaistics, theorist in linguistics, Orientalist, polyglot) Поливанов, Евгений Дмитриевич (in Russian)
- Poppe, N. N. (1897–1991) (linguist-Altaist)
- Potanin, G. N. (1835–1920) (Explorer, historian)
- Potapov, L. P. (1905–2000) (Turkologist, ethnographer, ethnologist)
- Potocki, Yan (or Jan) (1761–1815) (ethnologist, linguist, historian)
- Poucha, P. (Central Asian philology)
- Puech, H.-C. (linguist)
- Radloff, W. (1837–1918)
- Ramstedt, G. H. (1873–1950) (Altaic languages)
- Räsänen, Martti (Ryasyanen, M.)
- Rasonyi, L. (1899–1984) (Turkologist)
- Rasovsky, D. A. (historian)
- Rémi-Giraud, S. (linguist)
- William of Rubruck (Dutch: Willem van Rubroeck, Latin: Gulielmus de Rubruquis) (traveller, ca. 1248–1252)
- Rochrig, F. L. O. (Roehrig) (1819–1908) (Orientalist, Turkologist, Native American linguist)
- Rossi, Ettore (1884–1955) (Turkologist, Arabist, Iranist, historian and linguist)
- Samoilovich, A. N. (1880–1938, killed in Stalinist repressions) (Orientalist, Turkologist)
- Samolin, W. (1911–1972?) (Orientalist)
- Senigova, T. N. (Fine Arts, Turkologist)
- Sergi Jikia (1898–1993) (Historian and orientalist, founder of the Turkology in Georgia)
- Seydakmatov, K. (Turkologist, runiform writing)
- Shcherbak, A. M. (1926–2008) (Turkologist, runiform writing)
- Siemieniec-Gołaś, Ewa (Turkologist, linguist)
- Smirnova, O. I. (numismatist)
- Stachowski, Marek (linguist, etymologist)
- Stachowski, St. (linguist)
- Starostin, S. (1953–2005) (linguist, Altaic languages hypothesis)
- von Strahlenberg, P. J. (Philip Johan Tabbert) (1676–1747)
- Tekin, Talât (1927-2015) (Altaic languages)
- Tenishev, E. R. (1921–2004) (linguist, Central Asian philology)
- von Tiesenhausen, W. (Russian: Tizengauzen, V.G.) (1825–1902) (Orientalist, numismatist, archaeologist)
- Tietze, Andreas (1914–2003; Turkologist)
- Thomsen, Vilhelm (1842–1927) (Danish linguist, decipherer of the Orkhon inscriptions)
- Togan, Zeki Velidi (1890–1970) (historian, Turkologist, leader of liberation movement)
- Sergey Tolstov (1907–1976) (archaeologist)
- Tremblay, X. (philology)
- Vainberg, B. I. (archaeologist, numismatist)
- Vaissière, Étienne de la (Orientalist, philologist)
- Valihanov, Chokan (Shokan, Chokan Chingisovich) (1835–1865) (Turkologist, ethnographer, historian)
- Vambery, A. (1832–1913)
- Vandewalle, Johan
- Vasiliev, D. D. (Türkic runiform script)
- Velikhanly, N. M (Velikhanova) (Orientalist)
- Velyaminov-Zernov, V. V. (1830–1904) (Turkologist)
- Wang Guowei (王国维, 1877–1927) (Sinologist, historian, philologist)
- Wikander, S. (1908–1983) (Orientalist, philologist, Native American linguist) Stig Wikander (sv)
- Wittfogel, K. A. (1896–1988) (Sinologist, historian)
- Yadrintsev, N.V. (1842–1894) (archaeologist, Turkologist, explorer)
- Yudin, V. P. (1928–1983) (Orientalist, historian, and philologist)
- Zajączkowski, Ananiasz (1903–1970) (Turkologist)
- Zakiev, M. (1928-2023) (Philologist)
- Zehren, E. (Orientalist, archaeologist)
- Vásáry, István (Turkologist, historian)
- Zhirinovsky, V. V. (1946-2022) (Turkologist, philologist, politician)
- Zieme, P. W. H. (Turkologist, linguist)
- Zuev, Yu. (1932–2006) (Sinologist)

== See also ==
- Institute of Turkish Studies
- Ottoman studies
