= Edkhyam Tenishev =

Russian Turkologist (1921–2004)

- Эдхям Рахимович Тенишев
- Born: April 5, 1921; Penza
- Died: November 7, 2004 (aged 83); Moscow
- Burial place: Khovanskoye Cemetery

Academic background
- Education: Russian University of Transport, Leningrad State University
- Thesis: Грамматический очерк языка сочинения "Золотой блеск" (1953)
- Doctoral advisor: Sergey Malov

Academic work
- Discipline: Linguistics
- Sub-discipline: Turkology

Edkhyam Rakhimovich Tenishev (Russian: Эдхя́м (Эдге́м) Рахи́мович Те́нишев; Tatar: Әдһәм Тенишев; April 25, 1921 – July 11, 2004) was a Soviet and Russian linguist who specialized in Turkic and Mongolic languages. He was a doctor of philology, a professor, and a corresponding member of the Academy of Sciences of the Soviet Union. He served as the head of the Department of Uralic and Altaic languages at the Institute of Linguistics of the Russian Academy of Sciences. He was editor-in-chief of the journal Советская тюркология (Soviet Turcology) ISSN 0131-677X and of the multi-volume publication Сравнительно-историческая грамматика тюркских языков (Comparative-historical grammar of the Turkic languages).

== Biography ==
Tenishev was born April 25, 1921, in Penza to Rakhim Mubinovich Tenishev and Amina Alimovna Tenishev, members of a prominent Tatar family. When he was 10, his parents relocated to Jalal-Abad, Kyrgyz SSR where he attended high school. In 1938 he began his academic career at the Russian University of Transport, where he focused on mathematics and published on Euler integrals. During the Second World War, Tenishev applied to fight at the front but was rejected due to poor eyesight and worked instead at a post office and at the radio center of a military factory. After the war he entered Leningrad State University's Oriental faculty, where he studied under a variety of linguists, philologists, and orientalists, including Sergey Malov, Ignaty Krachkovsky, Nikolai Dmitriev, and Vasily Struve. Under Malov, Tenishev's main advisor, he studied a variety of Turkic topics, including Orkhon Turkic, Old Uyghur, and modern Turkic languages. He defended his undergraduate thesis on Kipchak languages in 1949 and entered graduate school. His PhD thesis was devoted to the Old Uyghur translation of the Golden Light Sutra, which he defended in 1953.

In 1954 Tenishev began work in the Turkic languages section of the Institute of Linguistics of the Russian Academy of Sciences under the supervision of Nikolai Dmitriev. In 1956 he was sent to Beijing to assist Chinese scholars in documenting understudied Turkic languages in China. While there he taught courses in Turkology and prepared two Chinese language works on the topic. Along with his collaborators, he went on three expeditions to western China – Xinjiang in 1956, Qinghai in 1957, and Xunhua in 1958 – where he collected linguistic and ethnographic materials. These materials formed the basis of his descriptions of the Salar and Western Yugur languages and of his works on Uyghur dialects.

In the mid-1990s Tenishev began to focus on the Turkic languages of the Crimea, including Crimean Tatar, Crimean Karaim, and Krymchak, and he continued to publish comparative descriptions of the Turkic languages and their dialects.

Tenishev's work was not limited to linguistics or Turkology. He participated in projects studying the contacts between the Turkic languages and the Mongolic, Uralic, and Western European languages, as well as Tibetology. He also promoted the study of folklore and epic poetry, serving as the editor-in-chief of the series Эпос народов Евразии (Epic of the Peoples of Eurasia), which published volumes on the epic poetry of the Finns and Karelians, the Buriats (such as the poem Gesar), and the Kyrgyz (the poem Manas).

== Awards and honors ==
- 1998. Inducted into the Türkiye Cumhuriyeti Liyakat Nişanı (Order of Merit of the Republic of Turkey)
- 2001. Inducted into the Order of "Danaker" by A. Akaev, president of Kyrgyzstan
- 2015. A new street in Kazan's Sovetsky City district was named for Tenishev

== Selected works ==
- Тенишев, Э.Р. (1953). Grammatichesky ocherk yazyka sochineniya "Zolotoy blesk" Грамматический очерк языка сочинения "Золотой блеск" [A grammatical outline of the language of the work "The Golden Light Sutra"] (PhD thesis). Leningrad State University.
- Тенишев, Э.Р.; Тодаева, Б. Х. (1966). Yazyk zheltykh uygurov Язык желтых уйгуров [The language of the Yellow Uyghurs] (in Russian). Москва: Издательство "Наука". OCLC 4706386.
- Тенишев, Э.Р. (1976). Stroy Salarskogo yazyka Строй Саларского языка [The structure of the Salar language] (in Russian). Москва: Наука. OCLC 7749259.
- Тенишев, Э.Р., ed. (1984). Sravnitelno-istoricheskaya grammatika tyurkskikh yazykov Сравнительно-историческая грамматика тюркских языков [A comparative-historical grammar of the Turkic languages] (in Russian). Москва: Изд-во "Наука". OCLC 13008487.
- Тенишев, Э.Р. (1990). Uygurskiy dialektny slovar Уйгурский диалектный словарь [Uyghur dialect dictionary] (in Russian). Москва. ISBN 9785020110168. OCLC 24702768.

== Bibliography ==
- Тенишева, Е. А., ed. (2005). Edgem Rakhimovich Tenishev. Zhizn i tvorchestvo. 1921–2004 Эдгем Рахимович Тенишев. Жизнь и творчество. 1921–2004 [Edgem Rakhimovich Tenishev. Life and works. 1921-2004] (in Russian). Moscow: Insan. ISBN 5-85840-329-8.
- Dybo, A.V.; Sheymovich, A.V. (2016). "Edkhyam Rakhimovich Tenishev" Эдхям Рахимович Тенишев. In Popatov, V.V. (ed.). Otechestvennye lingvisty XX veka Отечественные лингвисты XX века [Native linguists of the 20th Century] (in Russian). Moscow: Izadatelsky Dom YaSK. ISBN 9785990833036. OCLC 983727295.
