= Saul Abramzon =

Russian ethnographer (1905–1977)

- Born: July 3, 1905; Dmitrovsk, Russia
- Died: September 1, 1977 (aged 72); Leningrad, Russia
- Education: Leningrad University
- Occupations: Scientist-ethnographer; Turkologist; Specialist in Kyrgyz ethnology

Saul Matveyevich Abramzon (Russian: Сау́л Матве́евич Абрамзо́н) (3 July 1905 in Dmitrovsk – 1 September 1977 in Leningrad) was a scientist-ethnographer, Turkologist, and specialist in Kyrgyz ethnology. Saul Abramzon graduated from Leningrad University in the former USSR. He specialized in Turkic ethnology under Turkologists like Samoilovich A.N. and S. E. Malov. Residing mostly in Leningrad, and working in Leningrad section of the Ethnography Institute, Saul Abramzon at the same time was a member of Kyrgyz scientific commission on history. He began scientific ethnography of the Kyrgyz people, and directed the Kyrgyz State museum in the Kyrgyz capital, Frunze. At that time, he worked simultaneously as a deputy director of the Kyrgyz Scientific Research Institute, a scientific custodian of the Kyrgyz State Historical Museum, and later, a director of the Kyrgyz Ethnological Institute.

Almost all ethnographic expeditions carried out in Kyrgyzstan from 1926 to the 1960s were conducted under Saul Abramzon's leadership. He is considered as the principal founder of Kyrgyz ethnographic studies. In the process, Saul Abramzon brought up a generation of Kyrgyzstan expert ethnographers.

Abramzon was engaged in a wide range of scientific problems, covering almost all aspects of the ethnography of the Kyrgyz people. The major theme of S. Abramzon's research was ethnogenetic, historical and cultural connections of the Kyrgyz with peoples of Middle Asia, Southern Siberia and the Central Asia, forms of Kyrgyz economic activities, material culture, ceremonies, customs and beliefs. Saul Abramzon left a huge scientific heritage: monographies, articles, reviews. They are stored at the History Institute of Kyrgyzstan Academy of Sciences.

== Early childhood and studies ==
Saul Abramzon was born in 1905 by his father Mendel Abramzon and mother Raisa Grigoryevna Fayn. In I916, he was enrolled into a gymnasium in Karacharov in Orel Province. However, when his father died he returned to continue his education in a higher elementary school in his hometown. In 1922 at the age of 17, Abramzon was admitted to Leningrad Agricultural Institute. Two years later, he transferred to the ethnographic faculty of the Geographical Institute. In 1926, Abramzon graduated from the Geographical Institute at the age of 26.

== Publications ==
- Абрамзон С.М., 1946 "Очерк культуры киргизского народа", Фрунзе, 1946
- Абрамзон С.М., 1957, "К вопросу о патриархальной семье у кочевников Средней Азии", КСИЭ, Вып. 28.
- Абрамзон С.М., 1971, "Киргизы и их этногенетические и культурные связи" Л.
- Абрамзон С.М., 1973, "Очерки по истории хозяйства народов Средней Азии и Казахстана", Л.
- Абрамзон С.М., 1977, "Фольклорные мотивы в киргизских преданиях генеалогического цикла. Фольклор и этнография: Связи фольклора с древними представлениями и обрядами", М.
