= Willy Bang Kaup =

German Orientalist and turkologist

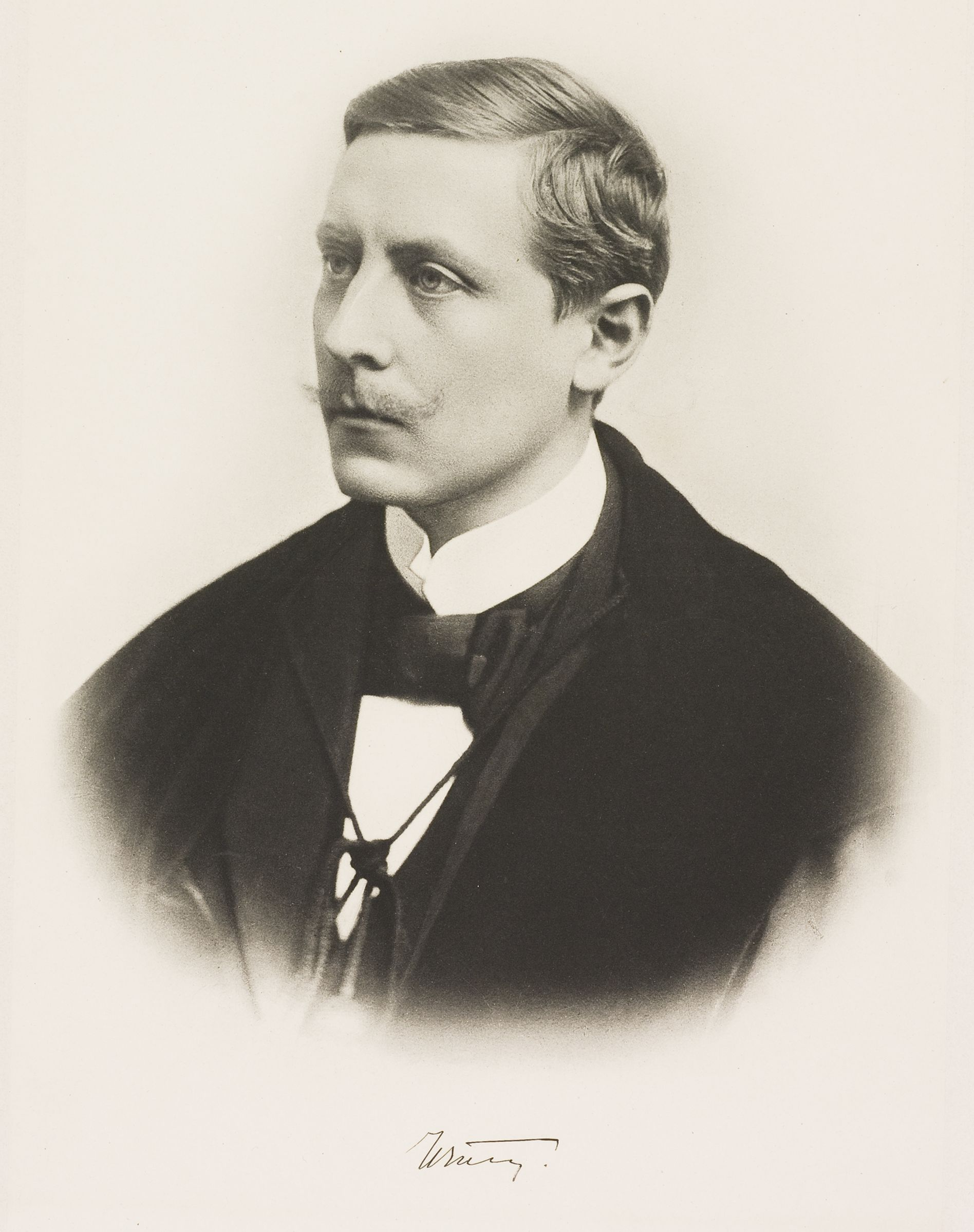
- Born: Johann Wilhelm Max Julius Bang; August 9, 1869; Wesel, Germany
- Died: October 8, 1934 (aged 65); Darmstadt, Germany
- Children: 4
- Parent(s): Heinrich Bang, Auguste Bang (née Kaup)

Johann Wilhelm Max Julius Bang Kaup, (born August 9, 1869, in Wesel, died October 8, 1934, in Darmstadt) (also Willi Bang or Willy Bang or Willy Bang-Kaup) was a German turkologist, linguist and orientalist.

== Biography ==
Willy Bang Kaup was born to Heinrich Bang and Auguste Bang. Heinrich was a lawyer by profession and was the Mayor. Willy Kaup was inducted to orientalism during his early days. This facts have become evident by H. L. Fleischer during their communications via letters at a later point of time. Bang Kaup did study Manchu, Old Persian, Avestan, and Mongol with Charles de Harlez. In 1893 and 1909 he brought out a new edition of ancient Persian inscriptions together with Friedrich H. Weissbach and wrote several articles on the subject. Both of them also wrote notes on the inscriptions which later became helpful in comprehending the writings.

From 1893 Bang started to carry out researches in ancient Turkish stone inscriptions, the runic alphabet, which had been deciphered by Vilhelm Thomsen using the methods of language comparison with modern Turkic languages and dialects. With Josef Markwart, Bang Kaup achieved a breakthrough in the chronological classification of the inscriptions. From 1910 to 1914, Bang worked on the Codex Cumanicus. Then he returned to the studies of old Turkish manuscripts from Turfan.

During 1895 to 1914, Bang worked as a professor of English in Leuven and wrote several important studies on English literature. When the First World War broke out, Bang left Belgium and in 1917 became professor of Turkish Studies in Frankfurt. In 1918 he was appointed professor at the University of Berlin where he continued the researches about the Turfan manuscripts, especially Manichaean and Christian texts. With Annemarie von Gabain, he published annotated editions of Turfan texts as well as a glossary on the vocabulary of these texts. Bang elaborated the classical issues in the historical grammar of the Turkic languages in his several writings (“Vom Köktürkischen zum Osmanischen,” “Monographien zur türkischen Sprachgeschichte”).

== Selected works ==
- Materials for the education of the older English drama.
- Manichean lay confession mirror.
- Manichean hymns.
- Fragments of a Nestorian George Passion.
- Turkish Turfan Texts Vol. 1–6, 1929–1934.
- Analytical index. 1931.
- From Turkish to Ottoman.
- Monographs on the history of the Turkish language.
- Parentalia: Basics of a History of Anxiety. As Ms. gedr., Uystpruyst, Loewen 1908 digitized

== Bibliography ==
- Hans Heinrich Schaeder : On W. Bang's sixtieth birthday. In: Hungarian Yearbooks 9, 1929, pp. 181–187.
- Henri de Vocht: Bibliography of the work of Professor W. Bang Kaup. In: Hungarian Yearbooks 9, 1929, pp. 188–195.
- Annemarie von Gabain : W. Bang Kaup 1869–1934. In: Hungarian Yearbooks 14, 1934, pp. 335–340 and p. 140.
- Annemarie von Gabain: Bang-Kaup, Johann Wilhelm Max Julius. In: New German Biography (NDB). Volume 1, Duncker & Humblot, Berlin 1953, ISBN 3-428-00182-6, p. 576 (digitized version).
- Annemarie von Gabain: Personal memories of W. Bang Kaup. In: Language, History and Culture of the Altaic Peoples. Berlin 1974, pp. 51–55.
- Andrej Nikolaevič Kononov: W. Bang-Kaup. For the hundredth birthday. In: Language, History and Culture of the Altaic Peoples. Berlin 1974, pp. 47–49.
- Sajora Khassankhanova: On the history of Berlin Turkology in the first half of the 20th century. The development of the old Turkish Turfan texts. W. Bang-Kaup and his linguistic school. Unpublished dissertation. Berlin (GDR) 1979.
- Peter Zieme: Bang Kaup, Johann Wilhelm Max Julius. In: Encyclopædia Iranica . Vol. 3, 1989, pp. 691–692
- Michael Knüppel, Aloïs van Tongerloo: The orientalist republic of scholars on the eve of the First World War. The correspondence between Willi Bang (-Kaup) and Friedrich Carl Andreas from the years 1889 to 1914 (= treatises of the Academy of Sciences in Göttingen NF 20). Berlin 2012.
