= Nikolai Dmitriev (linguist) =

Soviet linguist (1898–1954)

Nikolai Konstantinovich Dmitriev (Russian: Николай Константинович Дмитриев; 1898–1954) was Doctor of Philology, professor, an outstanding Orientalist-Turkologist, corresponding member of the USSR Academy of Sciences, member of Russian Federation Academy of Sciences, Distinguished Scientist honoree of Turkmenia, Bashkiria, Chuvashia, and recognized member of the world Turkology.

== Biography ==
Dmitriev was born on August 28, 1898, in Moscow, in a professional family. In 1916, after graduating with a gold medal the 3rd Moscow gymnasium, he joined the Historical-Philological faculty of the Moscow University, and in 1918 he entered in parallel Lazarev Near Eastern Institute (former Lazarev Oriental Languages Institute). In 1920. Dmitriev graduated from the Moscow University, and in 1922 Near Eastern Institute (renamed to Oriental Studies Institute) in three majors, Turkish, Persian and Arabic. Dmitriev also studied in depth Classical languages, Serbian, Bulgarian, modern Greek, Armenian, Romanian, Arabic, Persian, Pehlevi, Syrian, Turkish, Tatar, Bashkir and Kazakh, in addition to the main European languages (French, German, English and Italian. Dmitriev was also engaged in Slavic philology and then Turkology.

== Information ==
Dmitriev's linguistic views formed under influence of school of F.W.Radloff, continued by P.M.Melioransky.

The range of Dmitriev scientific interests was very wide. It developed right at the beginning of his career, when the scientist almost simultaneously started to work on Turkish, Tatar, Bashkir, Gagauz, Kumyk, Azeri, Turkmen, and other languages of the extensive Turkic family that soon became a subject of his specialty.

Dmitriev was a convinced supporter of the theory that stipulates a genetic unity of the Turkic languages. That led to the comparative and comparative-historical methods as the main tool in studies of the structure of Turkic languages; and to the synthetic approach to the problems of Turkology, which explain the overall unity of his thematically various research on the languages of Turkic group.

Dmitriev took a primarily historical view of the linguistic phenomena. He was an expert on morphology, syntax, phonetics, lexicology, dialectology, and history of the Turkic languages. When the ideas by N.Ya. Marr began being strenuously propagandized in the Stalinist Soviet Union, Dmitriev remained alien to the attempts to discover in Turkic languages "stadial reorganizations", and to the attempts to discover in Turkic languages inflection, prefixes, etc., which did not escape even some competent foreign Turkologists. He initiated a push against some errors that at times prevented a correct understanding of the phenomena typical for Turkic languages.

After F.W. Radloff and V.A. Bogoroditsky, Dmitriev suggested a new, more specific definition and formulated relationship of palatal and labial vowel synharmonism, pointing to the subordinated character of the labial articulation. His position about phonetic variability of the root in the Turkic languages was an important development that corrected an existing postulate in Turkology according to which a root in the Turkic languages is unchangeable.

A prominent place in the Dmitriev's works held the questions of lexicology. A special place in the Dmitriev's scientific biography addresses the problem of the Türko-Slavic linguistic relations. In the problem of the Turkic loans in Slavic languages, and first of all in Russian, Dmitriev's research brought in new dimensions, studying time, conditions and penetration paths of these loans into the Russian and Slavic languages. His brochure Structure of Turkish language expressed in a compressed form his valuable observations about loans in the Turkish vocabulary, historical conditions of their penetration in Turkish language, and the nearest intermediaries that conducted loans from territorially remote languages. The special Slavophonic training received by Dmitriev before his Turkological education allowed him to turn to Slavic languages and Turkic texts in a Slavic transcription as a major source on the history and dialectology of the Turkic, especially southern Turkic languages. His research in this area had even greater value for the Slavic philology, because it complemented studies on the influences of the Turkic languages on Slavic languages. In his last years Dmitriev started publishing his research on the Russian-Turkic language comparisons.

In his last years Dmitriev's attention especially attracted the question on attitude of the Turkic languages to the category of grammatical gender. On the material of Azeri language, Dmitriev published a special article on this subject, suggesting a presence of vestiges or hints on the grammatical gender in the modern Turkic languages.

Dmitriev wrote baseline scientific descriptions for many of Turkic languages, including Kumyk, Bashkir, Turkmen, and Gagauz.

The "Grammar of Kumyk language" was a first in a Turkology scientific description of this language with general Turkological impact. The Gagauz language for the first time was investigated by Dmitriev, one of his two works is devoted to phonetics, and another gave its grammatical and lexical description. Dmitriev described the strong palatalisation of the Gagauz consonants, and noted morphological, and especially syntactic and lexical features of the Gagauz language that distinguish it from others. This characterization helped to establish its relationship with it southwest group of the Turkic languages.

Dmitriev sent two decades' worth of materials he had collected on the Azeri language to be published as a large scientific grammar, but during the Siege of Leningrad it was lost, together with the first edition of the "Bashkir language grammar". Dmitriev devoted to the Bashkir language a major part of his research, and the best of them, "Bashkir language grammar", together with his other fundamental works became desktop book of the Turkologists. For comparative purposes Dmitriev also involved other language families, Indo-European (Western European languages, Latin, certainly Russian), Uralic (Hungarian and others) allowing wide linguistic interpretation.

Under Dmitriev's editorship was published "Russian-Bashkir Dictionary" with a grammatical sketch the Bashkir language. Another monumental lexicographic works of Turkology was the "Russian-Chuvash dictionary" under Dmitriev editorship with a grammatical sketch the Chuvash language. Dmitriev co-authored Khakas grammatical book.

Dmitriev was not only a linguist Turkologist, but also an expert on Turkic folklore. He published or co-authored works on Crimean-Tatar, Azeri, Turkmen, and Slavic folklore, and Azeri songs in Armenian transcription.

Dmitriev established the Kumyk, Bashkir, Turkmen, Azeri and Chuvash branches of Turkic linguistics.

For 16 years (1925–1941) Dmitriev was closely connected with the Leningrad State University and Oriental Institute, where he headed the faculty of Turkic philology. His energy and efforts led to creation of Oriental Branch at the Philological faculty of the Moscow State University, which he headed till the last days of his life. He also worked to establish methodology of teaching Russian in Turkic schools.

During Dmitriev's 30-years pedagogical work he created a large number of university courses, including Turkic paleography.

Dmitriev's outstanding achievement was preparation of scientists in the field of Turkology. Under his leadership completed post-graduate work and received post-graduate and doctoral degrees many tens of ethnically Turkic students.

The leading Turkological scientists of the central and local linguistic centers are mostly Dmitriev's pupils. His pupils work in Moscow, Leningrad, Baku, Ashkhabad, Alma-Ata, Bishkek, Tashkent, Samarkand, Kazan, Ufa, Makhachkala, Cheboksary, Yakutsk, Abakan and other cities. Among them are members of Academies, Doctors of sciences and professors, prominent figures in culture and education.

== Bibliography of N. Dmitriev works ==
The extensive bibliographical listing does not attempt to list all works of N. Dmitriev, but only to give a representative sample of the breadth and depth of N. Dmitriev's contributions to Türkology and associated sciences.

- Elements of Turkish language in Serbian folk poetry (Turkisms in folklore collection of Vuk Karadjich), 1916–1918, "Linguistics", ("Элементы турецкаго языка въ сербской народной поэзiи (Турцизмы въ фольклорныхъ сборникахъ Вука Караджича)")
- Chansons populaires tatares, 1. Les chansons populaires tatares et leur formation, «Journal asiatique», CCVIII, № 2, Paris, 1925–1927, "Journal asiatique, vol. CCVIII, No. 2, CCXII, No. 2, Paris, 1925-1927"; ("Tatar folk songs")
- Beitrdge zur Osmanischen Mimologie // "Wiener Zeitschrift für die Kunde des Morgenlandes. Bd. XXXIV, Hf. 1-2, 3-4, Wien", 1927, ("To studies of Osmanian mimology")
- Notes on Bolgaro-Turkish vernaculars, 1927, DAN-B, No. 10 ("Заметки по болгаро-турцким говорам")
- Etudes sur la phonetique bachkire, 1927, "Journal asiatique, vol. CCX, Paris, 1927"
- Skizze der Südtürkischen Mimologie, 1929, // "WZKM, Bd. XXXVI, Hf. 1-2", 1929, ("Sketch of southern Turkic mimology")
- "Th" in Modern Turkich languages, 1929, // "Le monde oriental, Vol. XXIII, 1929"
- Turkish elements in Russian argo, 1931, // "Language and Literature, vol. 7, Leningrad, 1931" ("Турецкие элементы в русских арго")
- Gagausische Lautlehre, I-II, 1932–1933, "Archiv Orientální, 1932, vol. IV, No 2-3; III—1933" ("Gagauz etudes")
- Azerbajdschanische Lieder in armenischer Transkription, WZKM, Bd. 41, Hit. 1-2, Wien
- Methodology in studies of Crimea-Tatar dialects and folklore, 1934, // "Economy and Culture of Crimea, No. 9-12" ("О методике изучения крымско-татарских диалектов и фольклора")
- Morfologia della lingua turca dei cummuchi (Caucaso), 1935 // "Rivista degli studi Orientali. Roma, 1935, Vol. XV, fasc. I, II-III" ("Morphology of Kumyk language")
- Materialen zur kumuckischen Phonetik, 1936 // "Le monde oriental, 1936, XXX"
- Grammar of Bashkir language, 1948, "Moscow-Leningrad", ("Грамматика башкирского языка")
- Languages of Northern Caucasus and Dagestan, 1949, issue 2, Moscow-Leningrad, ("Языки Северного Кавказа и Дагестана")
- Grammar of Azeri language, Part. 1, Baku, 1951 ("Грамматика азербайджанского языка")
- Article is a brief of E. V. Sevortian, 1955, From the development history of the Soviet Turkology (in Memory of N.K. Dmitriev) in Russian
