= Zeynep Korkmaz =

Turkish scholar (1921–2025)

- Born: 5 July 1921; Nevşehir, Ottoman Empire (now Turkey)
- Died: 6 February 2025 (aged 103)
- Education: Ankara University
- Known for: Dialectology
- Spouse: Mehmet Korkmaz (died 1984)
- Children: 2
- Scientific career
- Fields: Turkish language
- Workplaces: Ankara University

Zeynep Korkmaz (5 July 1921 – 6 February 2025) was a Turkish scholar and dialectologist.

== Early life and education ==
Korkmaz was born in Nevşehir on 5 July 1921. Her parents are Yusuf Hüsnü Dengi and Şefika Dengi. She has an elder sister and a brother.

She received elementary and secondary education in İzmir. In 1940, she graduated from Izmir Girls' High School. She graduated from Ankara University with a Bachelor of Arts degree in Turkish language and literature in 1944. She completed her PhD studies at the same department in 1950. Her Ph.D. thesis was concerned with dialects of Anatolia.

== Career ==
Following graduation, she became an assistant at the Faculty of Language, History and Geography (DTCF) of Ankara University in 1945. Then she began to work as an assistant at the department of Turkish language and literature of the same university in 1948. She went to Hamburg University for post-doctoral studies. She worked as a visiting scholar there from 1954 to 1955 and studied Old Turkish Language with A. von Gabain, O. Pritsak and O. Von Essen. She became associate professor in 1957 and professor in 1964. She retired in 1990.

== Personal life and death ==
Korkmaz married Mehmet Korkmaz, who died in 1984. She had two children. Korkmaz turned 100 in July 2021, and died on 6 February 2025, at the age of 103.

== Membership ==
Korkmaz was a member of the Turkish Culture Research Institute; Permanent International Altaistic Conference (PIAC); Ottoman-Pre-Ottoman Research Committee; Societas Uralo-Altaica; İLESAM (Professional Union of Turkish Science and Literature Academicians, Ankara).

== Works ==
Korkmaz wrote 16 books and more than 250 articles about the Turkish language. Some of her books are given below:

- (1963). Nevşehir ve Yöresi Ağızları (Turkish = Dialects of Nevşehir and nearby area), DTCF: Ankara
- (1973). Cumhuriyet Döneminde Türk Dili (Turkish= Turkish Language in the Republic Era), DTCF:Ankara

On her 60th birthday in 1982, a book was published by her pupils with the title of Prof. Dr. Zeynep Korkmaz'ın Hayatı ve Eserleri (Prof. Dr. Zeynep Korkmaz's life and works).
