= Louis Bazin =

French orientalist (1920–2011)

Louis Bazin (20 December 1920 – 2 March 2011) was a French orientalist.

== Biography ==
Born in Caen, he entered the École Normale Supérieure in 1939. When he graduated in 1943, he became a senior research fellow at the French National Centre for Scientific Research, while continuing his studies at the National School for Modern Oriental Languages.

In 1949, he became a professor-delegate after his teacher Jean Deny retired. In 1957, he became a full professor at the ENLOV (the above-mentioned Oriental Language School's new name). Since 1950, he has also been the director of studies at the École pratique des hautes études (Section IV). Beginning in 1980, Bazin became a Professor at the University of Paris III. He retired from his position there in 1990.

Bazin was a member of the Asiatic Society (of which he was formerly vice-chairman). He was also a member of the International Union of Oriental and Asian Studies (of which he was formerly the treasurer, secretary general and vice-president), and the Academy of Inscriptions and Belles-Lettres (elected 22 October 1993 to the chair Claude Cahen). He was Vice-Chairman of the Societas Uralo-Altaica, and was president of the section of Oriental Languages and Cultures of the French National Centre for Scientific Research.

== Bibliography ==
- 1950: Recherches sur les parlers t’o-pa - T’oung Pao (通報)
- 1953: La déesse-mère chez les Turcs pré-islamiques - Bulletin de la Société Ernest Renan
- 1959: Structures et tendances communes des langues turques - in Philologiae Turcicae Fundamenta
- 1959: Le Turkmène, description grammaticale - ibid.
- 1961: Y a-t-il en turc des alternances vocaliques ? - Ural-Altaische Jahrbücher
- 1964: La littérature épigraphique turque ancienne - Philologiae Turcicae Fundamenta
- 1964: Über die Sternkunde in alttürkischer Zeit - Abhandlungen der Mainzer Akademie
- 1965: Aventures merveilleuses sous terre et ailleurs de Er-Töshtük le géant des steppes, traduction du Kirghiz de Pertev Boratav, introduction et notes de Pertev Boratav et Louis Bazin, Gallimard, « Connaissance de l'Orient »
- 1967: Mirza Fathali Akhoundov : Comédies (traduction annotée)
- 1968, 1987: (3e ed.) Introduction à l’étude de la langue turque - Librairie d'Amérique et d'Orient - Jean Maisonneuve, succ.
- 1972: Un manuscrit chinois et turc runiforme de Touen-houang - Turcica
- 1973: Cinquante ans d’orientalisme en France. « les études turques » - Journal asiatique
- 1974: Les calendriers turcs anciens et médiévaux - thèse de doctorat
- 1975: Makhtoumkouli Firaqui : Poèmes de Turkménie - traduction annotée, en collaboration avec Pertev Borarav
- 1976: Eine Inschrift vom Obern Jenissei - Materialia turcica
- 1985: La réforme des langues don't «La réforme linguistique en Turquie» (Hambourg, 1985)
- 1989: L’épigraphie turque ancienne de Haute-Asie (VIII^{e}-XI^{e} s.) : Résultats et perspectives - CRAI
- 1989: Er-Töshtük (with Pertev Boratav)
- 1990: Où en est le comparatisme turco-mongol ? - Mémoires de la Société de Linguistique de Paris
- 1991: Les systèmes chronologiques dans le monde turc ancien. - Bibliotheca orientalis hungarica
- 1991: Manichéisme et syncrétisme chez les Ouïgours - Turcica
- 1994: Les Turcs, des mots, des hommes, choix d’articles de Louis Bazin - recueil d’articles édité par Michèle Nicolas et Gilles Veinstein
- 1994: État des discussions sur la pénétration du bouddhisme en milieu turc - Res Orientales. Hommages à Claude Cahen
- 1995: Les noms de Dieu et du Prophète dans les premiers textes de la littérature turque islamique (XI^{e} s.) - Mélanges Philippe Gignoux
- 1995: Un nom turco-mongol du « nombril » et du « clan » - Beläk Bitig. Festschrift G. Doerfer
- 1995: Qui était Alp Er Tonga, identifié par les Turcs à Afrâsyâb ? - Pand-o-Sokhan. Mélanges offerts à Charles-Henri de Fouchécour
- 1996: Survivances préislamiques dans l’épigraphie funéraire des Turcs musulmans - İslam Dünyasında Mezarlıklar ve Defin Gelenekleri
- 1998: Le livre de Dede Korkut, Récit de la Geste oghuz - with Altan Gökalp - L’aube des peuples
