= Mirfatyh Zakiev =

Turkology scholar (1928–2023)

- Мирфатых Закиев; Мирфатыйх Зәкиев
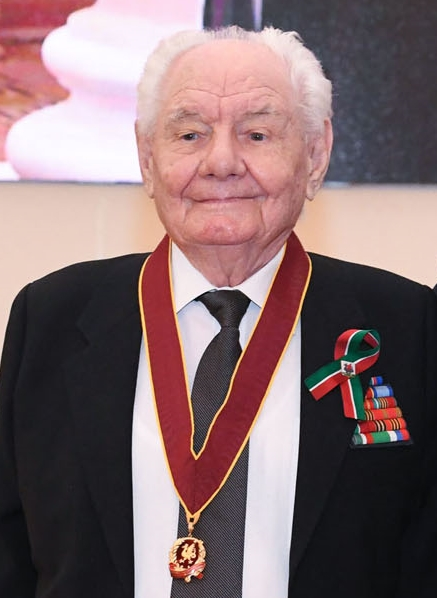
- Zakiev in 2021
- Born: 14 August 1928; Zaipy, Yutazinsky District, Tatar ASSR, Russian SFSR, USSR
- Died: 18 August 2023 (aged 95)
- Occupations: Linguist, university teacher and public figure
- Title: Doctor of Linguistics. Professor
- Board member of: Full member, and member of Presidium at Academy of Sciences of Tatarstan Republic (AN/RT)
- Awards: Honored Scientist of the Russian Federation (1976) and of the Tatarstan Republic (1970), Laureate of the Tatarstan Republic State Premium in Science and Technology

Academic background
- Education: Kazan State University
- Thesis: Syntactic Structure of the Tatar language (1963)

Academic work
- Discipline: Turkologist
- Institutions: Rector of Kazan State Pedagogical Institute, Dean of Tatar Language Faculty of Kazan State University
- Main interests: Syntaxis of Tatar language, History of Tatar linguistics, Development of Tatar language
- Notable works: The predicate in a modern Tatar literary language (1954); Syntactic Structure of the Tatar language (1963)

Mirfatyh Zakievich Zakiev (Russian: Мирфатых Закиевич Закиев; Tatar: Мирфатыйх Зәки улы Зәкиев, Mirfatıyx Zäki ulı Zäkiyev; 14 August 1928 – 18 August 2023) was a Soviet and Russian Turkologist of Tatar origin.

== Education and career ==
Mirfatyh held a doctorate, and served in a number of higher schools and institutes as a rector, director and department head (KGPI 1967–1986, IJALI 1986–1997).

A full member of the Academy of Sciences of the Tatarstan Republic, he was an ex-chairman of the Republican Parliament in the Tatar Autonomous Soviet Socialist Republic and had also headed the Scientific Commission of the Education Ministry of the Russian Federation for the philological sciences.

== Reception ==
For Zakiev's fundamental research in syntactic architecture of the Tatar language, academician B.A. Serebrennikov had commented: "This is the first most full and logically faultless monograph about the syntax of the Türkic languages".

Zakiev claimed that "proto-Turkish is the starting point of the Indo-European languages", that Sumerian, Ancient Greek, Icelandic, Etruscan and Minoan are languages of Turkic origin, and that the Sumerians, Scythians and Sarmatians were of Turkic origin. These views are generally rejected by the vast majority of scholars (see Pseudo-Turkology) and he had been frequently described as an "alternative historian" and a "militant amateur".

== Death ==
Mirfatyh Zakiev died on 18 August 2023, at the age of 95.
