= Xuastvanift =

Manichaean text

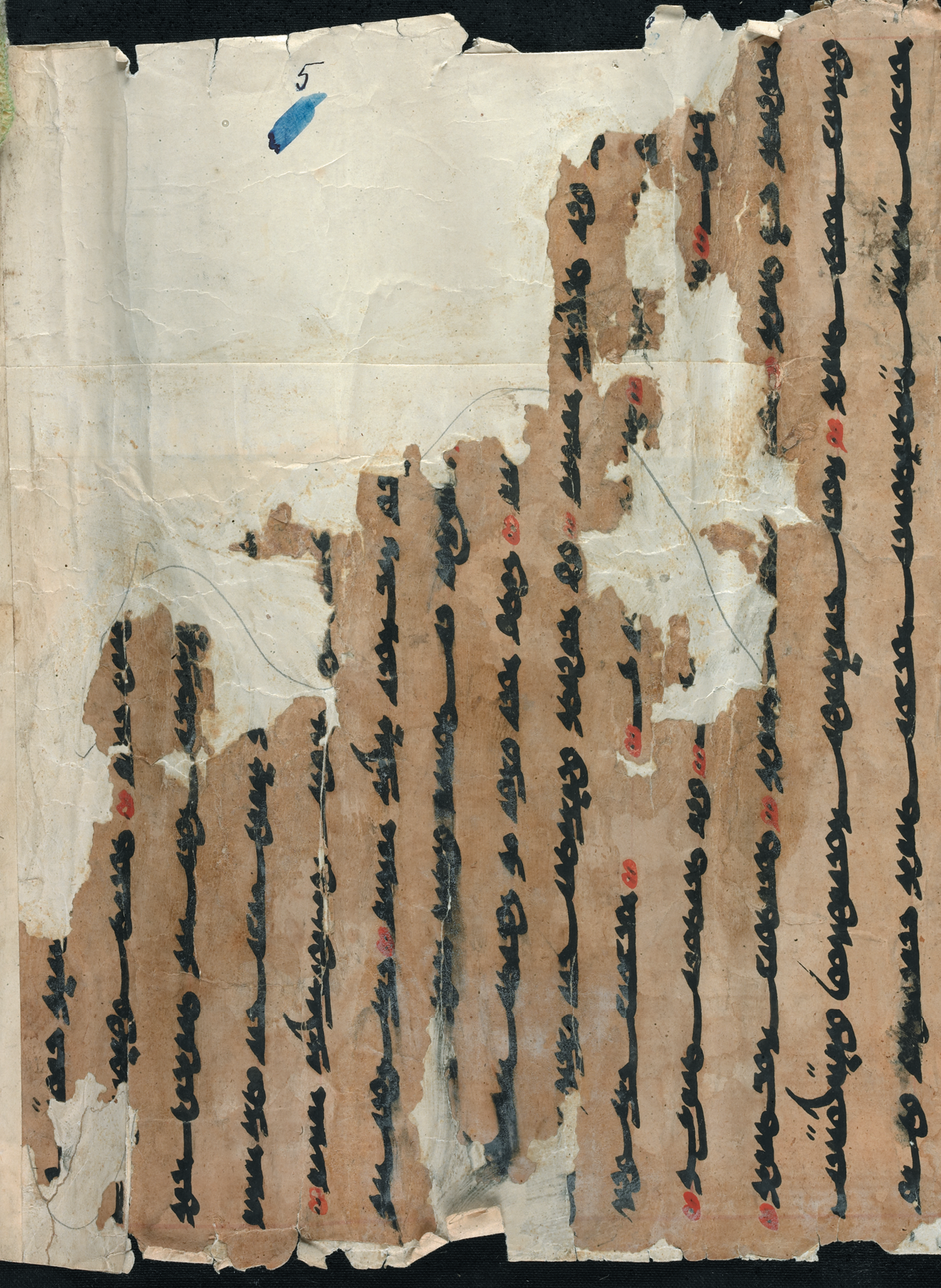
- Translators: Vasily Radlov (German), Jes Peter Asmussen (English)
- Language: Uyghur language
- Genre: Prayer-repentance
- Published: ~1000 (Uyghur)
- English publication date: 1965
- Pages: 6

Xuastvanift is a Manichaean text written in the Uyghur language containing a prayer of repentance. It was found in the Mogao Caves in Dunhuang, Gansu.
