= Vilhelm Thomsen =

Danish linguist and Turkologist (1842–1927)

His Excellency Vilhelm Thomsen RE
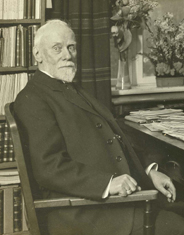
- Born: Vilhelm Ludwig Peter Thomsen; 25 January 1842; Copenhagen, Denmark
- Died: 12 May 1927 (aged 85); Copenhagen, Denmark
- Education: University of Copenhagen
- Occupations: professor linguist Turkologist
- Awards: Order of the Elephant

Vilhelm Ludwig Peter Thomsen (25 January 1842 – 12 May 1927) was a Danish linguist and Turkologist. He successfully deciphered the Turkic Orkhon inscriptions which were discovered during the expedition of Nikolai Yadrintsev in 1889.

== Early life and education ==
Vilhelm Thomsen was born in Copenhagen. He was the son of Chamber Councillor (kammerråd) Ludvig Frederik Thomsen and the elder brother of painter and illustrator Carl Thomsen (1847–1912).

He studied at the University of Copenhagen in 1859, graduating in 1867 and earning a PhD in 1869 with a dissertation on Germanic loanwords in Finnic.

== Career ==
He taught Greek at the Borgerdyd school in Copenhagen before becoming a professor at the University of Copenhagen. From 1875, he was an associate professor of comparative linguistics at the University of Copenhagen, and in 1887 he was appointed professor.

In 1876 he was invited to give the Ilchester Lectures at the University of Oxford, which were later published as The Relations Between Ancient Russia and Scandinavia, and the Origin of the Russian State.

Thomsen made a number of important contributions to linguistics, including his work on the Germanic, Baltic, and Indo-Iranian influences on Finnic. In 1893, he deciphered the Turkic Orkhon inscriptions ahead of Russian linguist Wilhelm Radloff (1837–1918). Thomsen first published the translation in French in 1899. He then published another interpretation in Danish in 1922 with a more complete translation.

According to an article on "The history of Uralic linguistics" by Bo Wickman (1988:808):

The Danish scholar Vilhelm Thomsen (1842–1927) was one of the greatest linguists of all times. He was active in an astoundingly great number of linguistic disciplines, and he was equally masterful in all of them.

== Personal life ==
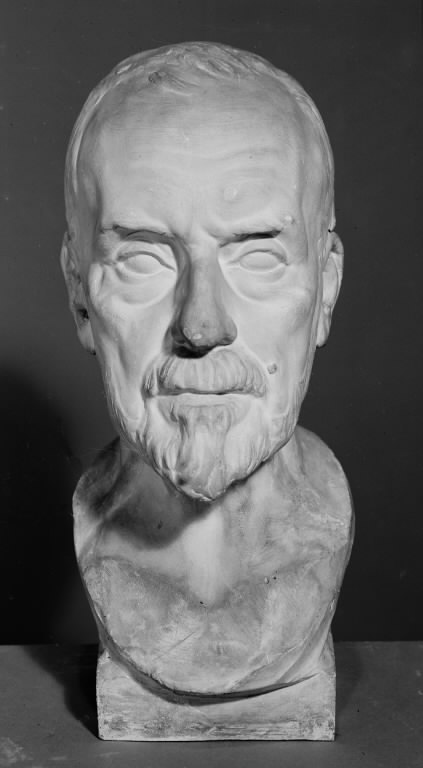
Bust of Thomsen by Kai Nielsen, 1923

Thomsen married Karen Charlotte Allen (22 August 1852 – 15 August 1934), a daughter of historian C.F. Allen (1811–71) and Ide Marie Dorph (1812–1910), on 5 May 1876 in Frederiksberg. Thomsen's daughter Kristiane Nicoline Thomsen (1877–1968) was the second wife of the Finnish linguist Emil Nestor Setälä.

He died on 12 May 1927 in Copenhagen and is buried in Solbjerg Park Cemetery.

== Honours ==
- In 1912 he received membership of the Order of the Elephant.
- Thomsen is honored on a stela set up in central Copenhagen along with three other Danish pioneers of modern linguistics; Rasmus Rask, Niels Ludvig Westergaard and Karl Verner.
- Thomsen was President of the Danish Academy from 1909 until his death, and was an honorary member of the Royal Asiatic Society of Great Britain and Ireland.
- Wilhelm Thomsen Caddesi is a street that is named after him in Ankara, Turkey, on which the National Library of Turkey is located.

== Selected publications ==
- The relations between ancient Russia and Scandinavia and the origin of the Russian state. Three lectures delivered at the Taylor Institution, Oxford, in May, 1876, in accordance with the terms of Lord Ilchester's bequest to the university
- 1896: Inscriptions De L'Orkhon Déchiffrées
- On the influence of the Germanic languages on the Finnish-Lappish

== See also ==
- Old Turkic script

== Sources ==
- Brøndal, Viggo. 1927. "L'œuvre de Vilhelm Thomsen." Acta philologica scandinavica 2:289–318. København.
- Wickman, Bo. 1988. "The history of Uralic linguistics." In The Uralic Languages: Description, History and Foreign Influences, edited by Denis Sinor. Leiden: Brill.
