= Irène Mélikoff =

Russian-French Turkologist (1917–2009)

- Born: 7 November 1917; Petrograd, Russian SFSR
- Died: 8 January 2009 (aged 91); Strasbourg, France
- Citizenship: France
- Education: University of Paris
- Spouse: Faruk Sayar
- Children: 3
- Awards: Ordre des Palmes académiques (1978, 1983); Legion of Honour (1994)
- Scientific career
- Fields: Turkology
- Workplaces: University of Strasbourg

Irène Mélikoff (7 November 1917 – 8 January 2009) was a Russian-born French Turkologist.

== Life ==
Mélikoff's ancestors had been major industrialists in Baku, but she was born in the Russian capital. The family fled revolutionary Russia soon after the Communist takeover within weeks of her birth, arriving in France in 1919, when she was just two. There she graduated in Oriental languages from Sorbonne University in Paris. She gained her doctorate there in 1957.

Mélikoff married Faruk Sayar, the son of the Turkish mathematician Salih Zeki Sayar, in 1940 and moved to Turkey in 1941 with her husband. Returning to France in 1948, she conducted research in the field of Turkology and wrote famous works. Her research has covered Turkey, the Balkans, Azerbaijan, Iran and Central Asia. She was the head of the faculty of Turkology and Iran at the University of Strasbourg. Mélikoff has been elected a member of many international scientific organizations, including well-known societies such as Asia Society and Ernest Renan Society.

She long headed the Turkic and Iranian Studies Institute at Strasbourg University and was one of the co-founders of Turcica magazine as well as chairwoman of the Turkic Development Group. She was the author of a number of publications on Turkic studies — particularly on Sufism, the Alevis and Bektashis in Turkey - and received more than ten prestigious awards for her contribution to Oriental studies. She was an honorary doctor at Baku State University.

Mélikoff was editor-in-chief of Turkika, the only Turkology magazine published in Western Europe, also visited Tabriz in Iran and collected rich material about her beloved Shah Ismail Khatai. The prominent scientist praised Azerbaijani literature and its prominent representatives, and expressed her admiration for M. F. Akhundov's work.

She died from a serious illness in January 2009 in Strasbourg.

== Relations with Azerbaijan ==
In an interview, she expressed her love for Azerbaijan and said that she first came into contact with Azerbaijan in 1968 while in Central Asia. At that time, she communicated with Azerbaijanis who came to the scientific conference.

After the Soviet Army's massacre in Baku on 20 January 1990, Melikoff rallied in Paris with many members of the Azerbaijani exile.

== Family ==
Her father was Russian oil tycoon, merchant, intellectual and philanthropist Ivan Andreevich Melikov, and her mother was the Russian ballerina Yevgenya Nikiforovna Mokshanova. In 1940, she married Faruk Sayar, the son of the Turkish mathematician Salih Zeki Bey. The marriage later ended in divorce. From this marriage, she had three daughters, Sonya, Ladin and Shirin Laure.

Following in her mother's footsteps, her daughter Shirin Malikova specialized in Azerbaijani literature and received a doctorate. In October 2019, she was awarded the Jubilee Medal of the Democratic Republic of Azerbaijan by the Permanent Representative of Azerbaijan to the Council of Europe.

== Bibliography ==
- La Geste de Melik Danişmend (Paris, 1960)
- Abu Muslim, le “Portre-Hache” du Khorassan dans la tradition épique Turco-Iraienne, (Paris, 1962)
- Uyur İdik Uyardılar Alevîlik-Bektaşîlik Araştırmaları (Istanbul, 1992)
- De L’épopée au Mythe/Itinéraire Turcologique, (Istanbul 1995)
- Hacı Bektaş/Efsaneden Gerçeğe
- Hadji Bektach: Un Mythe et ses avatars/Genèse et évolution du Soufisme populaire en Turquie, Leiden (New York-Köln, 1998)
- Tarihî ve Kültürel Boyutlarıyla Türkiye’de Alevîler-Bektaşîler-Nusayrîler (Istanbul, 1999)
- Kırklar’ın Cemi’nde (Istanbul, 2008)

She has written more than 70 scientific articles.
