= Kyrgyz State Historical Museum =

Museum in Bishkek, Kyrgyzstan

Coordinates: 42.8777°N 74.6038°E

National History Museum of the Kyrgyz Republic
- Established: December 9, 1925
- Location: Bishkek (Kyrgyzstan)
- Founder: Saul Abramzon
- Website: historymuseum.kg

The National History Museum of the Kyrgyz Republic (Kyrgyz: Кыргыз Республикасынын Улуттук тарых музейи, romanized: Kyrgyz Respublikasynyn Uluttuk tarykh muzeyi) is a museum located in Bishkek, Kyrgyzstan. The museum contains literally thousands of exhibits about the cultural heritage of the Kyrgyz people, whose sculptures and objects date from antiquity to the end of the 20th century. It is one of the most important museums in Central Asia.

== History ==
During the 1920s and 1930s, one of the objectives was to complete certain ethnographic and archaeological collections, therefore, the construction of a museum to store different types of cultural and historical artifacts of Kyrgyzstan was proposed. The museum was founded in December 9, 1925 as the first scientific institution in Kyrgyzstan. In 1927, the museum was first opened to the public, the museum has received several contributions from historians and ethnographers such as Aleksandr Natanovich Bernshtam.

In 1933, the name of the museum was changed to Museum of Local Customs. In 1943, the name of the museum was changed again to the Museum of National Culture. In 1954, it was renamed the State Historical Museum. In the 1960s it moved to a building constructed in 1928, this building was designed by the architect Zenkov. The current building where the museum is located was built in 1984. The construction of the building was intended to give the museum a distinctive design. It is located near the government house on Ala-Too Square.

In 2003, there was originally a statue of Lenin at the entrance of the museum but it was moved behind the museum, to a more secluded location.

The museum has several cave sculptures from the Bronze Age, as well as a series of collections of ancient coins and many ethnographic objects, jewelry and clothing from the 1st to the 5th century. Also, the museum contains various photographs and documents about the formation and development of the Kyrgyz Soviet Socialist Republic. The museum also houses exhibits on the migration of people in Central Asia. There is a typical handmade felted nomad yurt and mannequins dressed in typical clothing also.

In 2016, renovation work began on parts of the museum funded by the Turkish Cooperation and Coordination Agency.

During the 2016–2021 Turkish-aided redevelopment of the State History Museum of the Kyrgyz Republic, the Soviet statues and paintings inside the building were completely removed. Since its reopening, the museum displays a new collection about Kyrgyz history from ancient times until today. In addition, it was renamed National History Museum of the Kyrgyz Republic.

== Gallery ==
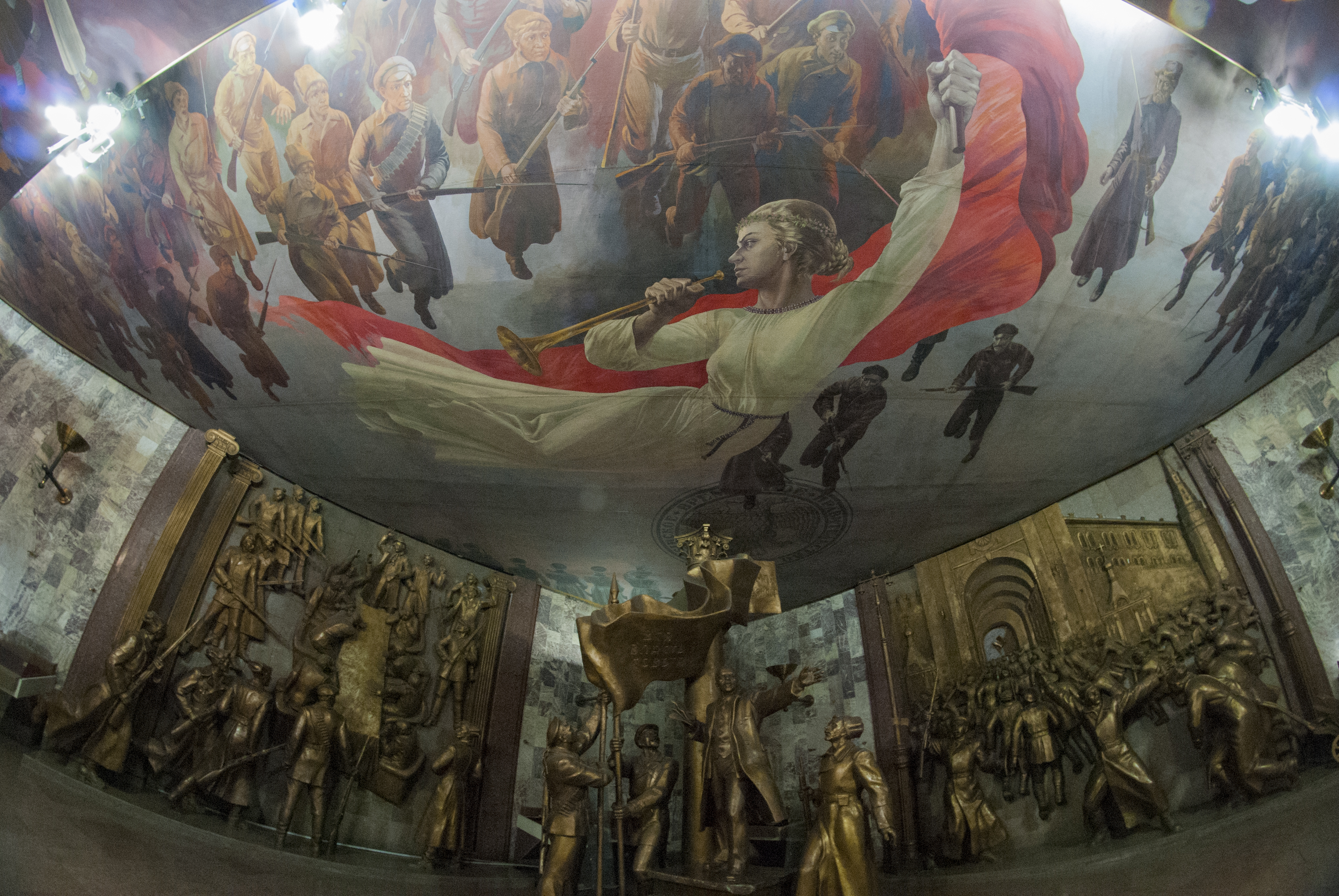
Former Soviet interior of the museum

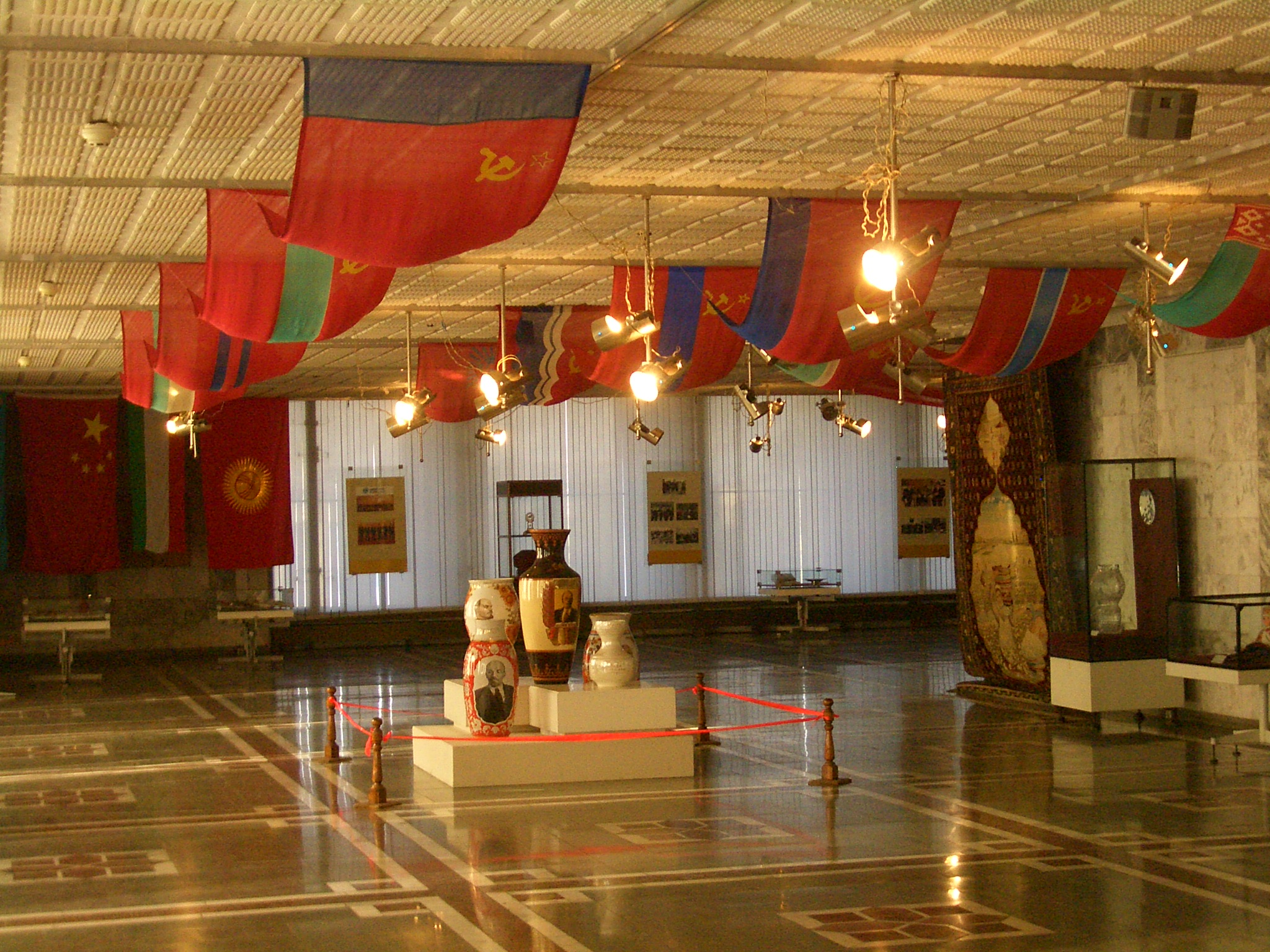
Former Soviet collection of flags

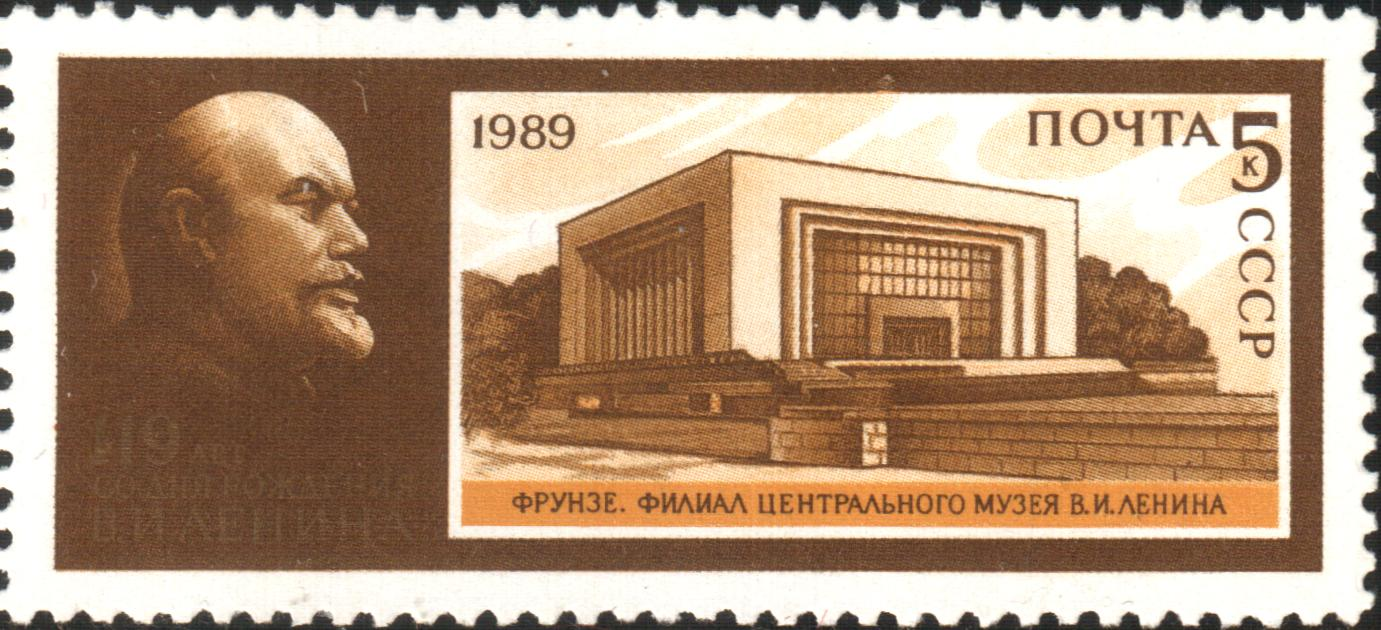
The Soviet Union 1989 CPA 6065 stamp (Vladimir Lenin. The State History Museum (Bishkek))

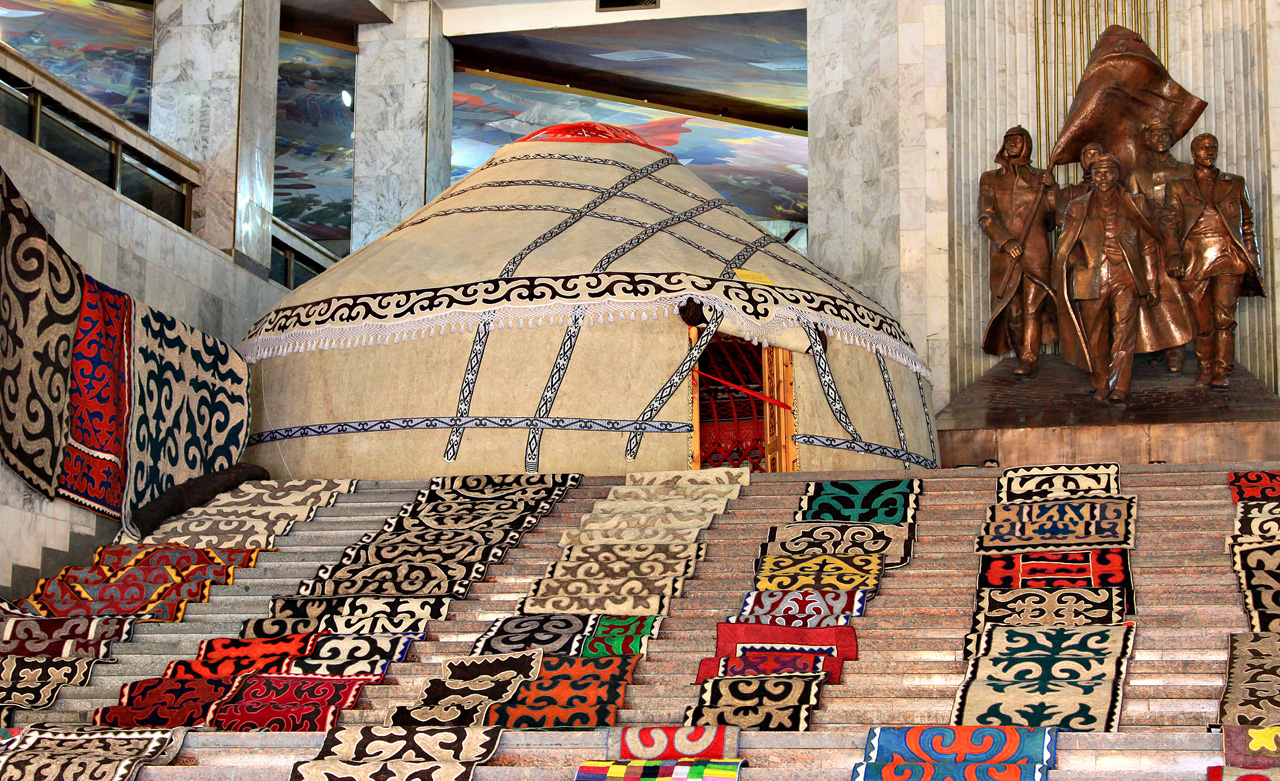
Traditional carpets
