= Benjamin P. Yudin =

Veniamin Petrovich Yudin (1928–1983) was a Kazakhstan scholar of oriental studies, historian, philologist, expert on Persian and Turkic manuscripts, researcher and teacher. Yudin was born on February 1, 1928, in Stalingrad (modern Volgograd). Yudin started his scientific and pedagogical activity as Uighurologist in 1950 after graduating Moscow Institute of Oriental Studies, where he completed a postgraduate study in Uighur philology under a known Turkologist Prof. V.M. Nasilov.

In 1955 Yudin started his work at the Kazakhstan Pedagogical Institute in a newly opened Uighur branch, where he lectured in Uighur language the classes of ancient and classical Uighur literature, folklore and language. In 1960-1976 he lectured in the Kazakhstan State University and worked in the Uighurology Department of the Linguistics Institute of Kazakhstan SSR Academy of Sciences. Alongside the Kazakhstan artifacts, Yudin investigated from historical and philological points the richest manuscript heritage of the Uighur people. Yudin authored over 80 scientific publications in Russian, Uighur and Kazakh languages, some of them were re-published in English.

Yudin studied manuscripts unearthed in Xinjiang, northwest China, including "Chingiz-name" by Utemish-Khodja (16th century), "Tarih-i Shaibani" (beginning of 17th century), "Ziya' al-kulub" by Mukhalemad Avaz (beginning of 17th century).

Yudin's work "Clan and tribal composition of Moghuls of Moghulistan and Moghulia and their ethnic connections with Kazakh and other neighboring peoples" (News of Kazakhstan SSR Academy of Sciences, Social sciences, 1965, No. 3) broke ground in "nonconventional" illumination of the Moghulia state as distinct from Moghulistan in ethnic, territorial and chronological relations, state structure, and about Moghulian ethnic composition which contributed to the Kazakh, Uighur and Kirgiz peoples.

Much of Yudin's research was not published during his lifetime, including his translations of sources, research on history of the Kazakhs and Uighurs and other subjects.
