= Manvel Gasratjan =

Russian historian (1924-2007)

Manvel Arsenovich Gasratjan (also Gasratian) (Russian: Манвел Арсенович Гасратян) was a Russian historian, born in 1924 who died in 2007. He was a renowned Turkologist and Kurdologist at the Institute of Oriental Studies of the Russian Academy of Sciences (Institút vostokovédenija Rossíjskoj akadémii naúk) in Moscow, where he established the Group of Kurdologists in 1979. According to WorldCat, he has written at least 8 academic books on Turkish and Kurdish history held in major U.S. libraries.
