= Altay Sarsenuly Amanzholov =

Altay Sarsenuly Amanzholov (Kazakh: Алтай Сәрсенұлы Аманжолов, Altaı Sársenuly Amanjolov; February 6, 1934 – August 10, 2012) was a Kazakh SSR, Kazakh Turkologist. He followed his father Sarsen Amanzholov's steps continuing in this field of study.

== Biography ==
Amanzholov graduated in 1957 at the Eastern Languages Institute of Moscow State University, in Turkic philology. 1957-1960 and 1964–1966 at the Academy of Sciences, Kazakh SSR, 1966–1979 at lecturing in Kazakh language at the Kazakh State Women Pedagogical Institute. In 1975 he submitted his doctoral thesis on "Materials and research in the history of Old Turkic writing". 1979-1995 dean of the General Linguistics Faculty at Al-Farabi Kazakh National University

Amanzholov lectured for one year at the Karadeniz Technical University, Trabzon, Turkey, in 1993/1994. In 1995, he became a full member of the Kazakhstan Academy of Humanities.

== Publications ==
Amanzholov authored five monographs in Russian and Kazakh.

- Глагольное управление в языке древнетюркских памятников ("Verbal inflection in the language of the Old Turkic monuments"), Moscow: tzdatel'stvo "Nauka", 1969.
- Turkic runic graphics, Almaty, KazGU, three parts, 1980–1985
- Бабалар сөзі, Peking: Ұлттар баспасы, 1988, 70 pp. (Kazakh)
- Ортақ асыл мирас, Trabzon, 1994, (Turkish and Kazakh);
- Түркі филологиясы және жазу тарихы, Almaty, Sanat, 1996, 128 pp. (Kazakh);
- Қазақша-орысша лингвистикалық терминология сөздігі: Казахско-русский словарь лингвистической терминологии ("Kazakh–Russian dictionary of linguistic terminology"). Almaty, Қазақ университеті (1997), ISBN 9965-408-01-7, 2nd ed. 1999.
- История и теория древнетюркского письма ("History and Theory of the Old Turkic script"), Mektep, Kazakhstan (2003), ISBN 9965-16-204-2.
