= Sükhbaatar inscriptions =

Turkic inscription

Sükhbaatar inscriptions are Turkic inscriptions from the middle of the 8th century in Mongolia.

== Geography ==
Inscriptions are in Sükhbaatar Province, Tüvshinshiree District, eastern Mongolia.

== Discovery and translation ==
Professor Osawa Takashi has found two inscriptions, 3 to 4 meters in length. They are the biggest Turkic epigraphs ever discovered. Inscriptions have 2,832 letters, 646 words in 20 lines, and, on the upper part, some 30 tamga, tribal markings.

The inscriptions believe to have been dedicated to the deceased noblemen, written by other men from other tribes to participate in the burial ceremony of the deceased.

This discovery is important to study the history of eastern Turkic tribes and Aimags, some tribes such as Khitan, Tatabi and Tatar that spoke in Mongolian language, and the Tatar tribe that resided in eastern Mongolian regions during the first half of the 8th century.

== See also ==
- Orkhon inscriptions
- Old Turkic alphabet
