= Sergey Malov (linguist) =

Russian Turkologist

Sergey Yefimovich Malov (Russian: Серге́й Ефи́мович Ма́лов; 28 January 1880, Kazan – 6 September 1957, Leningrad) was a Russian and Soviet Turkologist who made important contributions to the documentation of archaic and contemporary Turkic languages, classification of the Turkic alphabets, and the deciphering of the Turkic Orkhon script.

== Biography ==
Malov studied at the Kazan Theological Academy. He later graduated from the Petersburg University in Oriental Languages. During his school years, he was drawn to the circle of Baudouin de Courtenay and attended Nechayev's course for Experimental Psychology. Malov majored in Arabic, Persid and Turkic languages. Early in his career he studied the Chulym Turks. After graduation he worked as a librarian in the Museum of Anthropology and Ethnography, affiliated with the Russian Academy of Sciences.

For the Foreign Ministry, Malov studied languages and customs of Turkic peoples living in China (Uyghurs, Salars, Sarts, and Kyrgyz). He collected various rich materials about folklore and ethnography, made musical records, and acquired precious ancient manuscripts, including the most important work of medieval Uyghur Buddhist literature - the Uyghur manuscript of the Golden Light Sutra, later published in cooperation with Vasily Radlov.

In 1917, Malov became a professor in Kazan University and a director of Numismatic collection. Simultaneously he studied the ethnography and dialects of the Volga Tatars, being one of the first to investigate the Mishar dialect of the Tatars.

In 1921, Malov was behind the idea of renaming the Xinjiang Turkic to Uighur at the Tashkent Conference.

In 1922, Malov returned to Petrograd and was elected a lecturer in the Petrograd University. He continued working in Leningrad universities, museums, and research, and Oriental and Linguistic institutes of the Academy of Sciences of the Soviet Union. As a University Professor and Dean of Turkic philology, Malov taught Chagatai, Uzbek, Oirot, and other languages, as well as the linguistics of ancient Turkic monuments. In 1929, Malov published his discovery of the Talas script, a third known variant of the old Turkic "runiform" alphabet.

In 1931, Malov initiated a transfer to the Oriental Department “to register and inventory books, newspapers and manuscripts in Arabic, Persian and, mainly, in all Turkic languages”. The work in the library afforded him an exceptional and uncensored “access to the current literature in Turkic languages”. In 1933, after the beginning of the Communist government's campaign to switch the writing of the Turkic peoples to Latinised scripts, Malov left the Oriental Department of the Academy of Sciences of the Soviet Union. In 1939, he was elected a corresponding member of the Academy of Sciences of the Soviet Union in language and literature. During World War II, Malov worked in Alma-Ata as a professor in the Kazakh University and Kazakh Pedagogical Institute.

Malov is known as a brilliant expert on live and extinct Turkic languages of the Soviet Union and adjacent countries. He penned around 170 publications on the language, folklore, history and ethnography of the Turkic peoples of the central and western China, Mongolia, Central Asia and Kazakhstan, Siberia and Volga regions. He was the first to scientifically describe a number of Turkic languages; discovered, researched, and published many ancient Turkic written monuments; and is credited with the creation of alphabets and orthographic rules for languages of the peoples of the USSR who did not have their own national historical script.

Malov was one of the few scientists who attracted the Szekler alphabet, among other Eastern Europe runiform alphabets, in his comparative studies. Another of his achievements was the conclusion that the Enisei runiform inscriptions included diverse ethnic groups of the Kyrgyz Kaganate. In his capital 1952 work, The Enisei Script of the Turks: Texts and research, Malov covered texts written in the Enisei runiform script, irrespective of their geographical location (Khakassia, Tuva, Mongolia), and successfully combined a paleographical, historical and sociopolitical approach to classify the alphabets of those monuments. It was the scientific analysis of Malov and J. Nemeth that allowed A.M. Scherbak to develop his seminal conclusion that “the Turkic runiform script has arisen in Central Asia as transformation of a preceding alphabet, and from there it spread in two opposite directions: to the east and to the west”.

Malov had a very active scientific life. He participated in the preparation of encyclopedias, dictionaries, and reference guides. Malov is revered as an icon of Russian Turkology. His works are prized for erudition, detailed knowledge, scientific honesty, and scrupulous research.

== Major works ==
- "Ancient Turkic gravestones with inscriptions in the basin of r. Talas". News of the Academy of Sciences of the Soviet Union (IAN), 1929
- Monuments of Ancient Turkic Writing: Texts and research. М.; L., 1951
- The Enisei Script of the Turks: Texts and research. М.; L., 1952
- Monuments of Ancient Turkic Writing of Mongolia and Kirgizia. М.; L., 1959
- Lobnorskij jazyk. Teksty, perevody, slovar (The Lob Nor language: Texts, translations, dictionary). Frunze: Izdat, 1956. AN Kirgiz. SSR. 196pp.
