= Vasily Radlov =

Russian Turkologist (1837–1918)

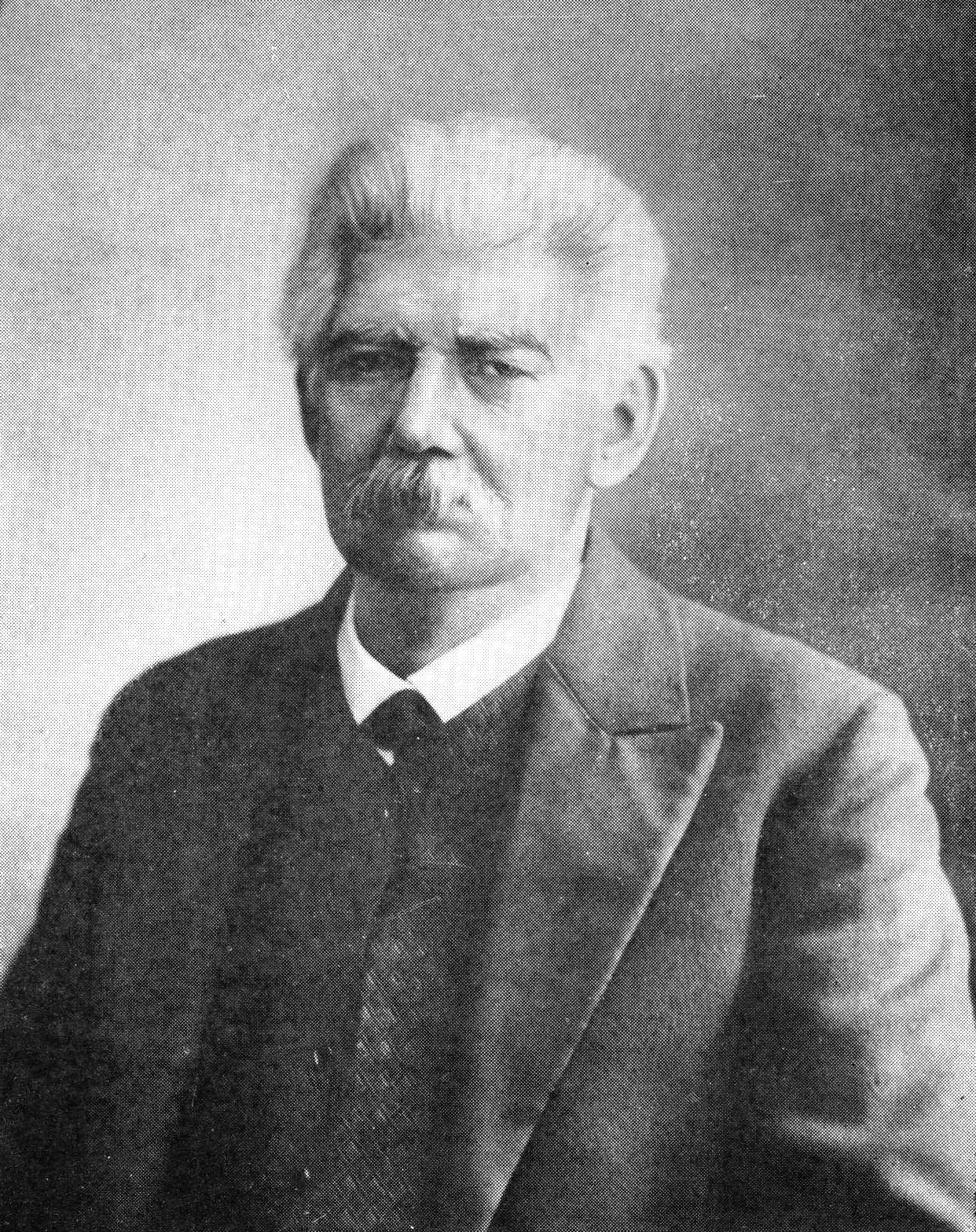
- Radlov in 1917
- Born: January 17, 1837; Berlin, Kingdom of Prussia
- Died: May 12, 1918 (aged 81); Petrograd, Russian SFSR
- Occupation: Turkologist

Vasily Vasilievich Radlov (Russian: Васи́лий Васи́льевич Ра́длов), born Friedrich Wilhelm Radloff (17 January [O.S. 5 January] 1837 – 12 May 1918) was a German and Russian linguist, ethnographer, and archaeologist, often considered to be the founder of Turkology, the scientific study of Turkic peoples. He was the first to publish the Orhon inscriptions (though he did not succeed in deciphering them).

== Career ==
Radlov studied at the University of Berlin (1854–58) and attended lectures by August Friedrich Pott at the University of Halle. His teachers included Carl Ritter, Heymann Steinthal, and Wilhelm Schott. In 1858, he defended his doctoral dissertation, On the Influence of Religion on the Peoples of Asia, at the University of Jena.

That summer, he arrived in St. Petersburg to study Uralic and Altaic languages and started working at the Asiatic Museum. In 1859, he passed examinations at the St. Petersburg University examination committee to qualify as a German language teacher in gymnasiums. That same year, he took an oath of allegiance to the Russian tsar and became a Russian subject.

According to Johan Vandewalle, Radlov knew all of the Turkic languages and dialects as well as German, French, Russian, Greek, Latin, Manchu, Mongolian, Chinese, Arabic, Persian, and Hebrew.

Until 1872, he taught German and Latin at the Barnaul district school. Alongside teaching, he conducted research, collecting Turkic linguistic and folklore materials in Altai, Kyrgyzstan, Khakassia, and Transoxiana. During his time in Altai, Radlov explored over 100 archaeological sites and excavated the first kurgan of the Pazyryk culture. He became interested in the native peoples of Siberia and published his ethnographic findings as the book From Siberia (1884).

From 1872 to 1884, Radlov served as an inspector of Muslim schools in Tatarstan, penning the first Russian-language textbooks for these schools. His participation in the Kazan linguistic school (led by Ivan Baudouin de Courtenay) significantly shaped his general linguistic views.

After 1884, Radlov was based in St. Petersburg, where he directed the Asiatic Museum (between 1885 and 1890) and then (from 1894) the Museum of Anthropology and Ethnography in the Kunstkamera building. From 1903, he was in charge of the Russian Committee for the Study of Central and East Asia. He also helped establish the Russian Museum of Ethnography.

Radlov organized and led numerous scientific archaeological and ethnolinguistic expeditions in Russia and abroad, including the Orhon expedition to Mongolia (1891), from which he brought the famous "runic" inscriptions, and many expeditions to East Turkestan (e.g., by Mikhail Berezovsky in 1905–06, by Sergei Oldenburg in 1909, by Sergey Malov in 1909–11 and 1913–14).

Radlov assisted Grigory Potanin on his glossary of Salar language, Western Yugur language, and Eastern Yugur language in Potanin's 1893 book The Tangut-Tibetan Borderlands of China and Central Mongolia.

== Achievements ==
Radlov laid the groundwork for Turkic lexicography, dialectology, historical textology, paleography, and comparative-historical linguistics, leaving an indelible mark on the study of Turkic languages and cultures.

His pioneering efforts in lexicography included compiling four volumes of a comparative dictionary of Turkic languages (published from 1893 to 1911) and preparing a dictionary for Old Uyghur texts, which, though unpublished, formed the foundation for the Old Turkic Dictionary (Древнетюркский словарь, 1969) through his meticulously curated card index. In dialectology, Radlov systematically collected and published dialect records from various Turkic ethnic groups, achieving the first classification of Old Turkic dialects.

Radlov's contributions to historical textology and paleography were equally transformative, as he produced the inaugural readings and publications of major Orhon and Yenisei inscriptions, alongside key Old Uyghur Buddhist texts such as the Sutra of Golden Light, Kuan-ši-im pusar, and Tisastvustik, the Manichaean text Huastvanift, Old Uyghur legal documents, and medieval Turkic monuments like Kutadgu Bilig and the Codex Cumanicus. One of the works he published was a Kyrgyz version of the epic Er Töshtük.

In the realm of comparative-historical linguistics, Radlov broke new ground with the first study of Turkic comparative phonetics, drafted the earliest grammatical sketch of the language of the Orhon-Yenisei inscriptions, explored the origins of the Yakut language, and characterized the phonetic and morphological structure of Turkic languages as agglutinative.

== Anti-Radlov campaign ==
During the Stalinist repressions of the late 1930s, the NKVD and state science apparatus accused the late (ethnically German) Radlov of Panturkism. A perceived connection with the long-dead Radlov was treated as incriminating evidence against Orientalists and Turkologists, some of whom were executed, including Alexander Samoylovich in 1938.

== Publications ==
- Radloff W. (1883). Aus Sibirien, Leipzig: T.O. Weigel Aus Siberien : vol.1 Aus Siberien : vol.2
- Atlas der Alterthümer der Mongolei : vol.1 (1892)
- W. Radloff. Versuch eines Wörterbuch der Türk-Dialekte.
  - Band I, 1. 1893
  - Band I, 2. 1893
  - Band II, 1. 1899
  - Band II, 2. 1899
- Radloff W.; trans. (1930). Suvarṇaprabhāsa: aus dem Uigurischen ins Deutsche übersetzt, Leningrad: Akad. Nauk SSSR.
- Radlov, Vasilij V (1913–1917). Suvarṇaprabhāsa: (sutra zolotogo bleska); tekst ujgurskoj redakcij, Sanktpeterburg. Imperatorskaja Akad. Nauk. XV. Reprint, Osnabrück. Biblio-Verlag 1970.
- Aus Sibirien. Lose Blätter aus meinem Tagebuche (1893)
- Tisastvustik; ein in türkischer Sprache bearbeitetes buddhistisches Sutra. I. Transcription und Übersetzung von W. Radloff. II. Bemerkungen zu den Brahmiglossen des Tisastvustik-Manuscripts (Mus. A. Kr. VII) von Baron A. von Stäel-Holstein (1910)

Preceded by Leopold von Schrenck	Director of the Peter the Great Museum of Anthropology and Ethnography; 1894–1918	Succeeded by Vasily Bartold
