= Jean Deny =

French grammarian (1879–1963)

- Born: 12 July 1879; Kiev
- Died: 5 November 1963 (aged 84); Gérardmer

Jean Deny (12 July 1879 – 5 Novembre 1963) was a French grammarian, specialist of oriental languages.

== Biography ==
Jean Deny was born to a French father and a Polish mother settled in Kiev. He became familiar with the French, Polish, Ukrainian and Russian languages at a young age. After the baccalaureate, he specialized in Oriental languages (classical Arabic, Arabic dialect, Persian, Turkish and Russian). He became professor of Turkology at the Sorbonne after he taught at the École nationale des langues orientales vivantes of which he was administrator from 1937 to 1948.

He retired in 1949 and died in 1963.

== Selected works ==
- 1921: Grammaire de la langue turque (dialecte osmanli)
- 1955: Principes de grammaire turque
- 1959: L’osmanli moderne et le turk de Turquie
