= Alexander Samoylovich =

Russian Orientalist and Turkologist

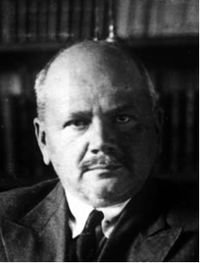
- Born: 29 December 1880; Nizhny Novgorod, Russian Empire
- Died: 13 February 1938 (aged 57); Moscow, Russian SFSR, USSR
- Occupations: Ethnologist, linguist

Alexander Nikolaevich Samoylovich (Russian: Алекса́ндр Никола́евич Самойло́вич; 29 December 1880 – 13 February 1938) was a Russian Orientalist and Turkologist who served as a member of the USSR Academy of Sciences (1929), Rector of the Leningrad Oriental Institute (1922–1925), academic secretary of the Humanities Branch of the USSR Academy of Sciences (1929–1933), and director of the Institute of Oriental Studies of the USSR Academy of Sciences (1934–1937). He was arrested by the NKVD in October 1937, and was executed on 13 February 1938.

== Career ==
Samoylovich was born on 29 December 1880 in Nizhny Novgorod, to the family of the director of the Nizhny Novgorod grammar school. His father was of Ukrainian origin and in Soviet bureaucracy Samoylovich was considered as ethnic Ukrainian. He studied at the Nizhny Novgorod Institute for Nobles, and then in the Oriental department of Saint Petersburg University, where he majored in Arabo-Persian-Turkic-Tatar languages. From 1907 he taught Turkic languages at St. Petersburg University, and in 1920 joined Vasily Bartold and Ivan Zarubin in providing Narkomnats with an ethnographic analysis of Turkestan and the Kirgiz steppe. In 1921 and 1922 he went to Turkestan ASSR, after which he became rector of a "Turkological seminar", which co-ordinated the work of Russian Turkologists. In 1924 he was elected a corresponding member, and in 1929 a full member (Academician), of the USSR Academy of Sciences. In 1927 he took part in an Academy of Sciences anthropological expedition to Kazakhstan which studied the life and the language of ethnic Kazakhs in the Altai Mountains.

Samoylovich's linguistic and ethnographic studies of the Kazakh people are credited with leading to the creation of a scientific definition of the ethnonym "Kazakh". He participated in the Soviet government's campaign to replace the Arabic-script-based writing systems used by Turkic peoples in the USSR with a uniform, Latin-based Turkic alphabet.

After his election as a member of the USSR Academy of Sciences, the Presidium of the academy tasked him with organizational work in the sciences. His position also involved him in state relations with the USSR's non-Russian national regions, and he was named the head of the Kirgiz, Kazakh, and Uzbek sections of a council studying the potential productive capacities of these regions. In 1932 the Presidium of the Academy of Sciences created the "Kazakhstan base", and Samoylovich was appointed its chairman. He continued to live in Leningrad, from where he oversaw studies and planning for the development and expansion of mineral extraction in the Kazakhstan region.

In 1933, under Samoylovich's direction, the Kazakhstan base of the USSR Academy of Sciences held sessions devoted to the development of the Karaganda coal basin and state plans for the creation of the Uralo-Kuznetsk combinate. Further sessions were held for the study of deposits of nonferrous metals in Altai and Zhezkazgan, for the development of the polymetal industry, and for the search and study of minerals (including oil) in Western Kazakhstan. In these scientific forums Samoylovich involved leading scientists of the time, such as academicians Alexander Fersman, Ivan Gubkin, and Andrey Arkhangelsky, geologists V. Nehoroshev and N.Kassin, and engineers K. Satpaev and M. Gutman.

Samoylovich was instrumental in the organization of a National Culture scientific research institute in Kazakhstan, with a view toward the development of the academic sciences in Kazakhstan. From his base in Leningrad, he believed that the creation of expanding branches and bases of the USSR Academies of Sciences would contribute to the scientific, economic, and cultural life of the USSR in general.

== Arrest and execution ==
Samoylovich's plans were cut short by the emergence of the Great Purge, which targeted many members of the intelligentsia as alleged "enemies of the people". Samoylovich was arrested on 8 October 1937 in Kislovodsk, imprisoned, and possibly tortured by the People's Commissariat of Internal Affairs. In February 1938, he was sentenced to "10 years without right of correspondence". On 13 February 1938 he was sentenced to death and shot the same day. He was formally expelled from the Academy of Sciences by a General meeting on 13 April 1938.

Documents from the archives of the Russian FSB show that Samoylovich's case was slated for "reprisal of the first category" (execution) on List No. 123, called "Moscow-center", dated 3 January 1938, with the names of 163 persons, initiated by NKVD department head V.E. Tsesarsky, and approved by the signatures of Andrei Zhdanov, Vyacheslav Molotov, Lazar Kaganovich, and Kliment Voroshilov. Samoylovich was sentenced on accusation of espionage for Japan, and creation of a counter-revolutionary Pan-Turkic nationalist organization. These charges were later proven entirely false.

In the post-Stalin era, the Soviet government officially recognized that Samoylovich had been unjustly persecuted and killed. He was declared rehabilitated on 25 August 1956; he was restored to the Academy of Sciences on 14 December 1956 (by decision of the Presidium of the Academy of Sciences, No. 7), and on 5 March 1957 (the decision of the General Meeting, No. 9).

== Scientific contribution ==
Samoylovich authored major works on the language, literature, folklore and ethnography of Turkic peoples in Crimea, Volga, North Caucasus, South Caucasus, Middle Asia, Kazakhstan, and Altai. Among dozens of various classifications of the Turkic languages, the classification developed by Samoylovich is most widely recognised; in 1917 Samoylovich was the first European scientist who gave a description of the tamgas and appreciated their historical importance.
