= Johan Vandewalle =

Belgian linguist

- Born: 15 February 1960 (age 66); Bruges, Belgium
- Spouse: Linda Gezels
- Children: 2

Academic background
- Education: Ghent University
- Thesis: De Turkse en Oezbeekse weergave van de semantiek van Russische prefixwerkwoorden die een verplaatsing uitdrukken (2013)
- Doctoral advisor: Raymond Detrez

Academic work
- Discipline: Linguist
- Institutions: Ghent University
- Main interests: Turkic languages

Johan Vandewalle (born 15 February 1960) is a Belgian linguist. He teaches at Ghent University and specializes in Turkic languages.

== Life ==
Vandewalle first became interested in Turkish at the age of thirteen, during a family holiday to Turkey.

He initially studied civil engineering and architecture, before deciding to focus on languages.

In 1987, at the age of twenty-six, he won the Polyglot of Flanders/Babel Prize, after demonstrating communicative competence in nineteen languages (Arabic, Azerbaijani, Bashkir, Dutch, English, French, German, Italian, Kyrgyz, Persian, Russian, Swahili, Tajik, Tatar, Turkish, Turkmen, Tuvan, Uyghur, and Uzbek). Seven old languages that he had studied (such as Latin and Old Church Slavonic) were not tested, and he has since gone on to study many more languages.

In 1993, together with his wife, Linda Gezels, he founded Orientaal vzw, a centre dedicated to the teaching of Oriental languages and cultures.

He has been awarded several prizes for his work in relation to the Turkish language, including the Türkçe Öğretiminde Başarı Ödülü in 1990 and the Ali Şir Nevai Türk Diline Hizmet Ödülü in 2005.
