= Annemarie von Gabain =

German Turkologist (1901–1993)

- Born: 7 April 1901; Morhange, France
- Died: 15 January 1993 (aged 91); Berlin, Germany
- Citizenship: German
- Known for: Turkic studies
- Scientific career
- Fields: Turcology, Sinology, Turkic studies
- Doctoral students: Annemarie Schimmel

Annemarie von Gabain (7 April 1901—15 January 1993) was a German scholar who dealt with Turkic studies, both as a linguist and as an art historian.

== Early life and education ==
Gabain was born in Morhange on 7 April 1901. Her father, Arthur von Gabain, was a general and from Protestant family, Hugenotte. However, her mother raised her as a Catholic. Gabain received primary and secondary education in Mainz and Brandenburg. She went to Berlin for university education. She took courses on mathematics, sciences, Sinology and Turcology. She completed a dissertation in Sinology. Von Gabain then studied Turcology with Johann Wilhelm Bang Kaup who was the founder of the Berlin school of Turkic studies. Later, she began to work on the Old Turkic materials kept at the Academy of Sciences in Berlin.

== Works ==
Gabain published many books on Turcology and Central Asia.

- (1973). Das Leben im uigurischen Konigreich von Qoco: (850-1250) (Veroffentlichungen der Societas. Uralo-Altaica), Harrassowitz, ISBN 344701296X.
- (1979). Einfuhrung in die Zentralasienkunde. Wissenschaftliche Buchgesellschaft. ISBN 3534071360.
- (1987). Die Formensprache der uigurischen Malerei (Veroffentlichungen der Societas Uralo-Altaica).ISBN 3447027495.

== Death ==
Gabain died on 15 January 1993 in Berlin.
