= Bairamov =

Bayramov
- Language: Turkmen; Azeri

Origin
- Derivation: Bayram
- Meaning: holiday

Other names
- Variant forms: Bajramović, Bajrami, Bayramoğlu

Bairamov or Bayramov is a surname. The female versions of the surname are Bairamova and Bayramova. Notable people with the surname include:

- Vladimir Bairamov (born 1980), Turkmen footballer
- Afgan Bayramov (born 1983), Azeri weightlifter
- Alikram Bayramov (born 1968), Azeri singer
- Aydın Bayramov (born 1996), Azeri footballer
- Ayshan Bayramova (born 1998), Azeri gymnast
- Döwlet Baýramow (born 1982), Turkmen footballer
- Durdy Bayramov (1938–2014), Turkmen academic and artist
- Fauziya Bayramova (born 1950), Russian Tatar politician and writer
- Fuad Bayramov (footballer, born 1994)
- Fuad Bayramov (footballer, born 1998)
- Ismayil Bayramov (1900–1945), Soviet Azeri soldier and national hero
- Jahana Bayramova (born 1997), Turkmen tennis player
- Jeyhun Bayramov (born 1973), Azeri politician
- Jeyran Bayramova (1896–1987), Azeri politician and women's rights activist
- Kamal Bayramov (born 1985), Azeri footballer
- Kamil Bayramov (born 1972), Azeri footballer and manager
- Kamran Bayramov (born 1979), Azeri politician and parliamentarian
- Maharram Bayramov (1928–1991), Soviet Azeri politician and journalist
- Narmin Bayramova (born 2005), Azeri gymnast
- Nazar Bayramov (born 1982), Turkmen footballer
- Nuru Bayramov (born 1963), Azeri surgeon and professor
- Rafig Bayramov (born 1972), Azeri politician
- Ramin Bayramov, Azeri journalist
- Rovshan Bayramov (born 1987), Azeri wrestler
- Samir Bayramov (born 1999), Russian footballer
- Tavakkul Bayramov (born 1981), Azeri taekwondo practitioner
- Toral Bayramov (born 2001), Azeri footballer
- Turan Bayramov (born 2001), Azeri wrestler and judoka
- Vugar Bayramov (born 1975), Azeri economist and parliamentarian
- Wladimir Baýramow (born 1980), Turkmen footballer and manager

== See also ==
- Ali Bayramov Club, women's football club in Baku
