= Bajrami =

- Language: Albanian (borrowed from Turkish)

Origin
- Derivation: Bayram
- Meaning: holiday

Other names
- Variant forms: Bajram, Bajramović, Bayramov, Bayramoğlu

Bajrami is an Albanian surname. Notable people with the surname include:

- Adrian Bajrami (born 2002), Albanian footballer
- Agron Bajrami (born 1967), journalist of Kosovo Albanian descent
- Arta Bajrami (born 1980), Albanian singer
- Azra Bajrami (born 1991), the real name of Canadian YouTuber Azzyland
- Eldis Bajrami (born 1992), Macedonian-Albanian footballer
- Emir Bajrami (born 1988), Swedish footballer of Kosovo Albanian descent
- Flamur Bajrami (born 1997), Kosovo-Albanian footballer
- Geraldo Bajrami (born 1999), English footballer of Kosovo Albanian origin
- Hykmete Bajrami (born 1987), Kosovar politician
- Luàna Bajrami (born 2001), French-Albanian actress
- Melos Bajrami (born 2001), footballer
- Muharem Bajrami (born 1985), Macedonian footballer of Albanian descent
- Nedim Bajrami (born 1999), Albanian footballer
- Salih Bajrami (1919–1987), Kosovan singer
- Selma Bajrami (born 1980), Bosnian singer of Albanian heritage
- Xhavit Bajrami (born 1975), Albanian-Swiss kickboxer
