= Bairampur =

Bairampur may refer to:

- Bairampur, Bangladesh
- Bairampur, Uttar Pradesh, India
- Bairampur, Raebareli, a village in Uttar Pradesh, India

== See also ==
- Bayram (disambiguation)
- Abad (disambiguation)
- Behrampura, neighbourhood in Ahmedabad, Gujarat, India
