= Bajramović =

Origin
- Languages: Bosnian, borrowed from Turkish
- Meaning: Eid al-Fitr

Other names
- Variant forms: Bajram, Bajrami, Bajramovic, Bayramoğlu

Bajramović is a Bosniak surname, derived from bajram, a Turkism meaning "Eid al-Fitr". It may refer to:

- Emir Bajramović (born 1980), Bosnian volleyball player at the highest national level
- Denis Bajramović (born 1961), Croatian basketball coach and former player
- Halil Bajramović (born 1971), Bosnian businessman
- Indira Bajramović, Roma activist and economist
- Irvina Bajramović (born 1995), Swedish footballer of Bosnian descent
- Ismet Bajramović (1966–2008), Bosnian soldier and reputed organized crime figure from Sarajevo
- Kenan Bajramović (born 1981), Bosnian basketball player who currently plays for Banvit B.K. in Turkey
- Mensur Bajramović (born 1965), Bosnian professional basketball coach
- Šaban Bajramović (1936–2008), Serbian-Romani musician
- Sead Bajramović (born 1973), Serbia-born Bosnian professional football player
- Sejdo Bajramović (1927–1994), Yugoslav soldier and politician of the former Yugoslavia
- Šener Bajramović (born 1950), Bosnian football player and manager
- Zlatan Bajramović (born 1979), German-born Bosnian footballer
