= Bayram =

Bayram or Bairam or Beyram may refer to:

- Bayram (Turkey), the Turkish word for a festival or celebration
- Bayrami (Bayramilik and Bayramiye), a Sufi order
- Public holidays in Azerbaijan

== People ==
- Bayram (name)

== Places ==
- Bayram, Baghlan, Afghanistan
- Beyram, Iran, a city in Fars Province, Iran
- Bairam, East Azerbaijan, a village in East Azerbaijan Province, Iran
- Bayram, East Azerbaijan, a village in East Azerbaijan Province, Iran
- Beyram, Kerman, a village in Kerman Province, Iran
- Beyram, West Azerbaijan, a village in West Azerbaijan Province, Iran
- Beyram District, an administrative subdivision of Fars Province
- Beyram Rural District, an administrative subdivision of Fars Province

== See also ==
- Bajrami
- Behram (disambiguation)
- Bairampur (disambiguation)
