= Bayram (name) =

Bayram is both a masculine Turkish given name and a Turkish surname. It is also spelled Bajram in Albanian. Notable people with the name include:

== Given name ==
- Bayram al-Tunisi (1893–1961), Egyptian poet
- Bayram Bektaş (born 1974), Turkish footballer and coach
- Bayram Çetin (born 1985), Turkish footballer
- Bayram of Chalybia (fl. 1313 – c. 1332), Turkish ruler of northern Anatolia
- Baýram Durdyýew (born 1955), Turkmen footballer and manager
- Bairam Khan, Mughal advisor and the prime minister of Akbar the Great
- Bayram Khwaja (died 1380), founder of the Qara Qoyunlu confederation
- Bayram Malkan (born 1994), Turkish amateur boxer
- Bayram Mustafayev (born 1987), Azerbaijani paralympic judoka
- Bayram Olgun (born 1990), Turkish footballer
- Bayram Özdemir (born 1976), Turkish wrestler
- Bayram Pasha (died 1638), Ottoman grand vizier
- Bayram Safarov (born 1951), Azerbaijani politician
- Bayram Şit (1930–2019), Turkish Olympic wrestler and trainer

== Middle name ==
- Hacı Bayram-ı Veli (1352–1430), Turkish Sufi
- Mahmud Bayram al-Tunisi (1893–1961), Egyptian poet

== Surname ==
- Aslı Bayram (born 1981), German actress and model of Turkish descent
- Canan Bayram (born 1966), German politician
- Pashanim (real name Can David Bayram, born 2000), German rapper
- Durmuş Bayram (born 1986), Turkish footballer
- Efe Bayram (born 2002), Turkish volleyball player
- Elif Bayram (born 2001), Turkish female basketball player
- Emin Bayram (born 2003), Turkish footballer
- Hussein Bayram (born 1975), French boxer
- İsmail Bayram (born 1954), Turkish weightlifter
- Mehmed Pasha Kurd Bayram, 18th-century Ottoman governor
- Mohamed Bayram II (1748–1831), Tunisian scholar and cleric of Turkish descent
- Mustafa Bayram, 16th-century Ottoman admiral
- Ömer Bayram (born 1991), Turkish professional footballer
- Serkan Bayram (born 1974), Turkish politician and lawyer

== See also ==
- Bajram (disambiguation)
- Bayram (disambiguation)
