= Cürəli =

Cürəli or Dzhurali or Dzhuraly may refer to:

- Aşağı Cürəli, Azerbaijan
- Aşağı Cürəli (Ashagy Dzhurali), Azerbaijan
- Yuxarı Cürəli, Azerbaijan
