= Curali =

Curali may refer to:

- Curali, Turkey in Yozgat
- Cürəli (disambiguation), several places in Azerbaijan
