= Rafig =

Rafig is a masculine given name of Azerbaijani origin, and it may refer to:

- Rafig Asgarov (born 1949) Azerbaijani military leader
- Rafig Babayev (1937–1994) Azerbaijani jazz musician, composer, conductor
- Rafig Bayramov (born 1972) Azerbaijani politician
- Rafig Hajiyev (born 1946) Soviet–Azerbaijani freestyle wrestler
- Rafig Hashimov (born 1966) Azerbaijani television host, journalist, essayist, director
- Rafig Huseynov (born 1988) Azerbaijani Greco-Roman wrestler
- Rafig Huseynov (announcer) (1946–2017) Soviet–Azerbaijani television announcer, host, actor and singer
- Rafig Mehdiyev (1933—2009) Azerbaijani painter and teacher
- Rafig Nasirov (1947-2024), Azerbaijani sculptor
