= Old Turkic =

Earliest attested Turkic language

- East Old Turkic
- 𐱅𐰇𐰼𐰚 𐱅𐰃𐰠𐰃 Türk tili
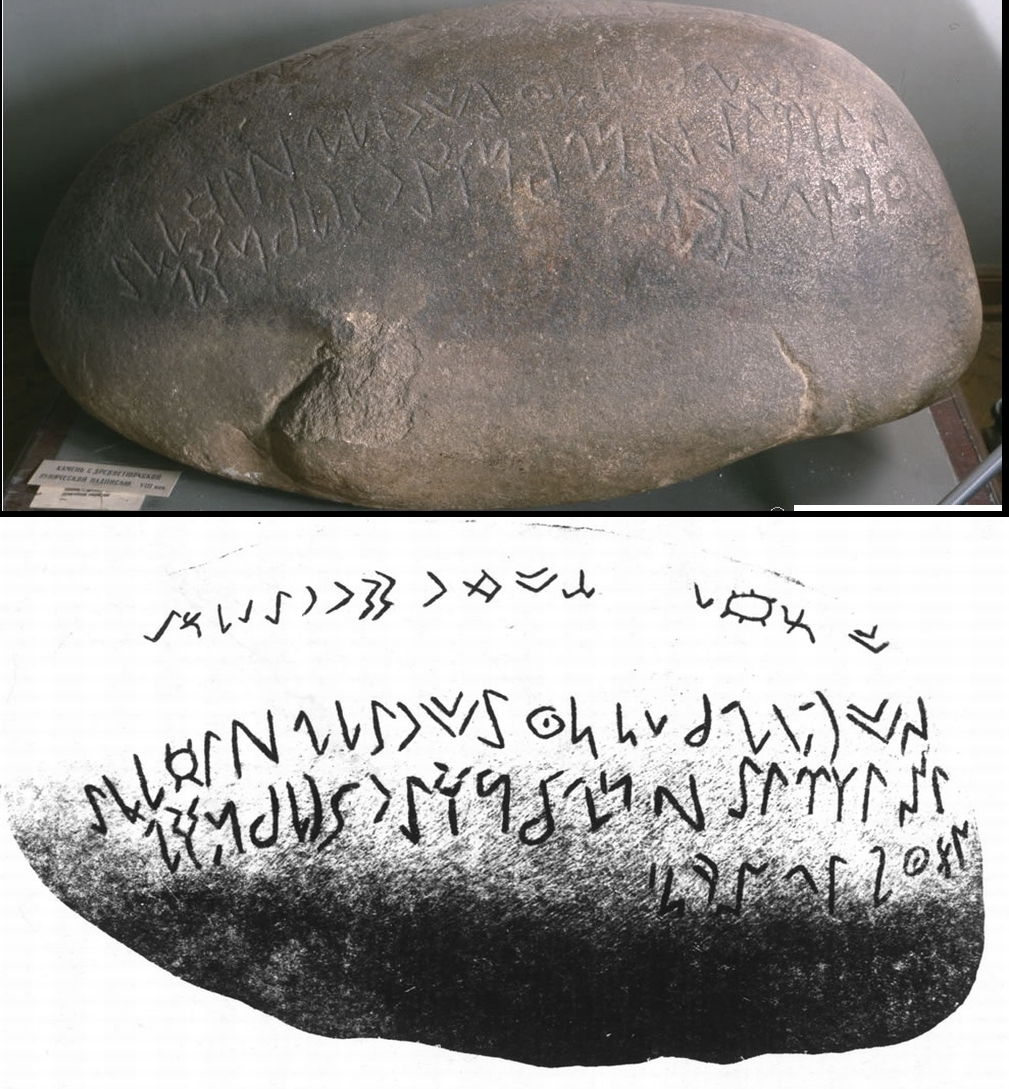
- Talas Inscription 1
- Native to: Second Turkic Khaganate, Uyghur Khaganate
- Region: East Asia, Central Asia and parts of Eastern Europe
- Era: 5th–13th centuries
- Language family: Turkic: Common Turkic; Siberian Turkic; South Siberian; Old Turkic
- Dialects: Orkhon Turkic; Old Uyghur
- Writing system: Old Turkic script, Old Uyghur alphabet

Language codes
- ISO 639-3: otk (Old Turkish)
- Glottolog: oldu1238

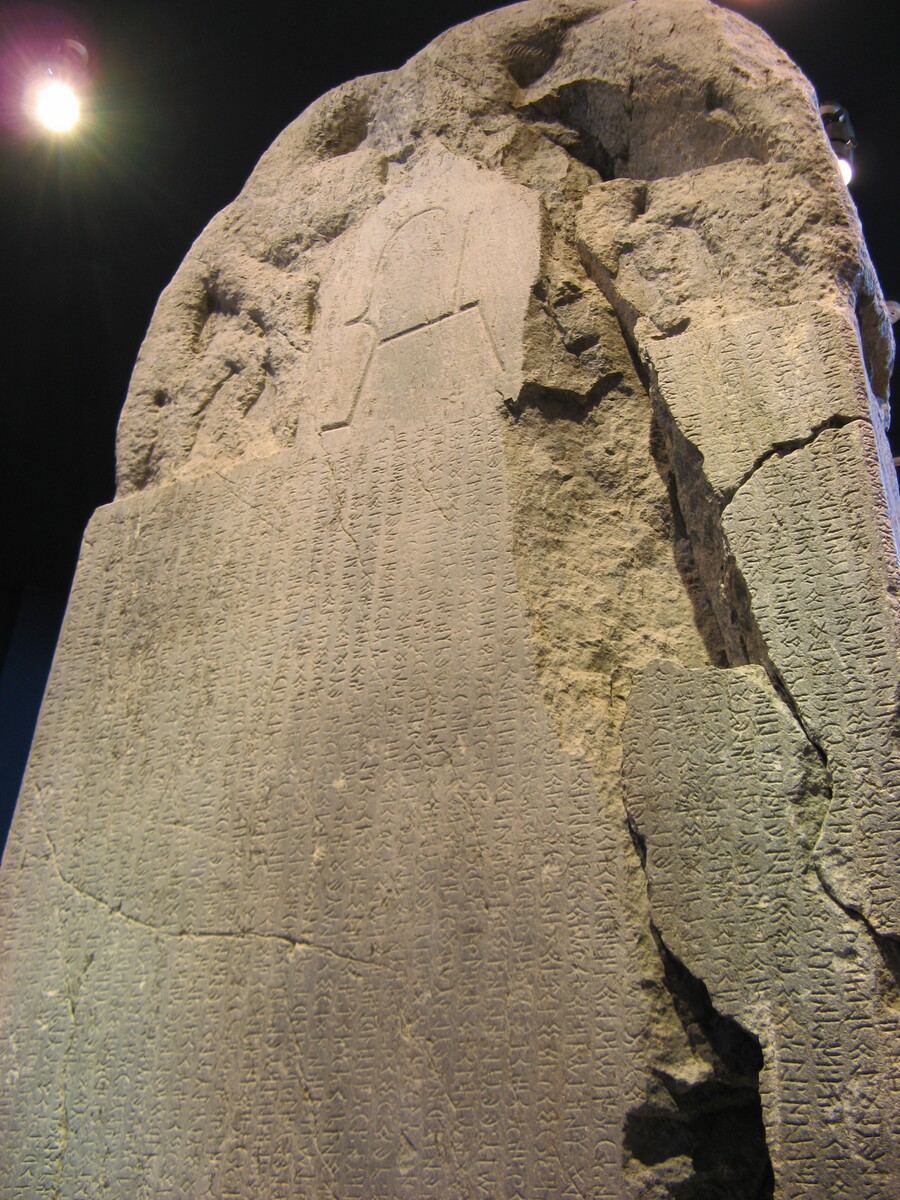
Monument to Kul Tegin

Old Turkic, also known as East Old Turkic, was a Siberian Turkic language spoken around East Turkistan and Mongolia. It was first discovered in inscriptions originating from the Second Turkic Khaganate, and later the Uyghur Khaganate, making it the earliest attested Common Turkic language. In terms of the datability of extant written sources, the period of Old Turkic can be dated from slightly before 720 AD to the Mongol invasions of the 13th century.

== Classification and dialects ==
Old Turkic can generally be split into two dialects, the earlier Orkhon Turkic and the later Old Uyghur. There is a difference of opinions among linguists with regard to the Karakhanid language, some (among whom include Omeljan Pritsak, Sergey Malov, Osman Karatay and Marcel Erdal) classify it as another dialect of East Old Turkic, while others prefer to include Karakhanid among Middle Turkic languages; nonetheless, Karakhanid is very close to Old Uyghur. East Old Turkic and West Old Turkic together comprise the Old Turkic proper, though West Old Turkic is generally unattested and is mostly reconstructed through words loaned through Hungarian. East Old Turkic is the oldest attested member of the Siberian Turkic branch of Turkic languages, and several of its now-archaic grammatical as well as lexical features are extant in the modern Yellow Uyghur, Lop Nur Uyghur and Khalaj (all of which are endangered); Khalaj, for instance, has (surprisingly) retained a considerable number of archaic Old Turkic words despite forming a language island within Central Iran and being heavily influenced by Persian. Old Uyghur is not a direct ancestor of the modern Uyghur language, but rather the Western Yugur language; the contemporaneous ancestor of Modern Uyghur was the Chagatai literary language.

East Old Turkic is attested in a number of scripts, including the Old Turkic script, the Old Uyghur alphabet, the Brahmi script, and the Manichaean script. The Turkic runiform alphabet of Orkhon Turkic was deciphered by Vilhelm Thomsen in 1893.

== Phonology ==
Vowels
	Front		Back	
	unrounded	rounded	unrounded	rounded
Close	i	y <ü>	ɯ <ï>	u
Mid	e	ø <ö>		o
Open	(æ <ä>)		ɑ <a>	

Some varieties of Old Turkic also possessed the vowel /æ/. Based on the presence or absence of this vowel, Old Turkic varieties can be divided into three main groups: those which only have /e/, those which only have /æ/, and those which have both /e/ and /æ/. In the latter varieties, /e/ is typically found only in the first syllable of a stem (similarly to /o/ and /ø/), while /æ/ is found mostly in non-initial syllables, barring a few cases where it may occur in the first syllable of a stem. This leads to different forms for the same word, such as teŋri~täŋri~taŋrï, sekkiz~säkkiz, and eren~ärän~erän. Modern Turkic languages show similar variation. In this article, only the vowel /e/ will be used.

Vowel roundness tends to be assimilated throughout the word through vowel harmony. The vowels /o ø/ are mostly confined to the first syllable of stems; however, the vowel /o/ is also found in certain suffixes such as the negative perfect participle suffix -madoq/-medoq. Length is distinctive for all vowels; while most of its daughter languages have lost the distinction, some of them preserve it either in the form of a true length contrast (e.g /i/ vs /iː/) or a monophthong-diphthong distinction (e.g /e/ vs /i̯e/, with diphthongization of long /eː/). Such languages include Yakut, Dolgan, and Khalaj. The Turkmen language has preserved the distinction nearly unchanged, except that long /eː/ was lowered to /æː/.

Consonants
	Labial		Dental		Post- alveolar/Palatal		Velar		Uvular/Glottal	
Nasal		m		n		ɲ <ň>		ŋ		
Stop	p	b~β <b>	t	d~ð <d>	t͡ʃ <č>		k	g~ɣ <g>	q	ɢ~ʁ <γ>
Fricative			s	z	ʃ <š>				(h)	
Tap/Flap				ɾ <r>						
Approximant			ɫ <l>	l		j <y>				

Old Turkic is highly restrictive in which consonants words can begin with: words can begin with /b~β/, /t/, /t͡ʃ/, /k/, /q/, /s/, /ɫ/ and /j/, but they do not usually begin with /p/, /d~ð/, /g~ɣ/, /ɢ~ʁ/, /l/, /ɾ/, /n/, /ɲ/, /ŋ/, /m/, /ʃ/, or /z/. The only exceptions are 𐰤𐰀 (ne, "what, which") and its derivatives, and some early assimilations of word-initial /b/ to /m/ preceding a nasal in a word such as 𐰢𐰤 (men, "I"). In addition, voiced plosives probably tended towards fricatives within intervocalic positions.

As in most modern Turkic languages, the consonants /k g~ɣ l/ were in complementary distribution with /q ɢ~ʁ ɫ/, with the former set restricted to words with front vowels, and the latter set restricted to words with back vowels. As such, they may be analyzed as being allophones of each other rather than distinct phonemes. The velar nasal /ŋ/ may also have had a uvular allophone [ɴ] in words with back vowels, especially before the uvular consonants /q ɢ~ʁ/.

Based on internal evidence from modern Turkic languages and the extant corpus from various archaic varieties of Turkic, it also seems that some varieties of Old Turkic possessed the consonant /h/. This sound seems to have been lost very early on, has not been preserved in most Turkic languages (both archaic and modern), and is not written in the Old Turkic runic script. The Western Yugur and Khalaj languages are assumed to have preserved this consonant sound in at least some words, but it is not clear which words represent a true retention of original /h/ and which are innovations of a new /h/ sound in words which previously began with a vowel sound in Old Turkic.

The consonant /ɲ/ was also relatively rare, and is reflected as /j/ in most Turkic varieties. Khorasani Turkic has preserved the sound, and Yakut has shifted it to /j̃/.

Word stress was most probably placed on the final syllable of the word, as is typical of most Turkic languages, though there may have been some cases in which a word-final suffix didn’t carry stress, leading to stress falling instead on the penultimate syllable.

== Writing systems ==
The Old Turkic script (also known variously as Göktürk script, Orkhon script, Orkhon-Yenisey script) is the alphabet used by the Göktürks and other early Turkic khanates during the 8th to 10th centuries to record the Old Turkic language.

The script is named after the Orkhon Valley in Mongolia where early 8th-century inscriptions were discovered in an 1889 expedition by Nikolai Yadrintsev.

This writing system was later used within the Uyghur Khaganate. Additionally, a Yenisei variant is known from 9th-century Yenisei Kirghiz inscriptions, and it has likely cousins in the Talas Valley of Turkestan and the Old Hungarian alphabet of the 10th century. Words were usually written from right to left. Variants of the script were found in Mongolia and Xinjiang in the east and the Balkans in the west. The preserved inscriptions were dated between the 8th and 10th centuries.

== Grammar ==
=== Cases ===
There are approximately 12 case morphemes in Old Turkic (treating 3 types of accusatives as one); the table below lists Old Turkic cases following Marcel Erdal’s classification (some phonemes of suffixes written in capital letters denote archiphonemes which sometimes are dropped or changed as per (East) Old Turkic phonotactics):

	Case Suffixes	Examples	Translation
Nominative	∅ (unmarked)	köŋül-∅	heart
Genitive	-niŋ/-nïŋ	Temürniŋ	Temür’s
Accusative I (Pronominal Accusative)	-ni/-nï	bunï	this
Accusative II (Nominal Accusative)	-ig/-ïγ/-üg/-uγ (Note: This Old Turkic accusative suffix is retained in Modern Turkish in the form of -i/-ı/-ü/-u. Karakhanid also employs this suffix.)	qïzlarïγ, Qarluquγ	girls, Karluk
Accusative III	-in/-ïn/-ün/-un/-n	oγlïmïn	my son
Dative	-qa/-ke/-γa/-ge	orduqqa	to palace
Directive / Allative (Note: Old Turkic possessed an opposition between dative -ka and allative -gArU/-kArU cases, the latter perhaps derived secondarily from the former at the pre-Old Turkic stage. It was rate in Buddhist Uyghur and Karakhanid. The dative case has been preserved intact in all the modern Turkic languages. On the other hand, the old allative has lost its case function, being preserved in a lexicalized manner in only a small number of adverbial expressions - for example, Uzbek ichkari ‘towards inside’. However, Tuvan and Khakas have reintroduced the formal opposition into their respective case systems. Khalaj is the only modern Turkic language to have retained this archaic case suffix, which fact has led Mahmud al-Kashgari to regard the suffix as a distinctive marker of Arghu language (i.e. Khalaj). Most of the remaining Turkic languages usually utilize the dative suffix -qa/-ke/-γa/-ge.)	-γaru/-gerü	ebgerü	towards home
Locative	-ta/-te/-da/-de	ebde, suγluqta	in house, in vessel
Directive-Locative / Partitive-Locative	-ra/-re	asra (Note: In directive-locative sense.), bara (Note: In partitive-locative sense.)	below, at/towards/on head
Ablative	-tin/-tïn/-din/-dïn/-tan/-ten/-dan/-den	qaŋtïn	from father
Equative-Lative	-ča/-če (Note: This suffix is retained in the modern Siberian Turkic languages Altai and Shor. It is also retained as a case form in Khalaj, but indicates locative case.)	tükegüče	up to/till end
Instrumental	-in/-ïn/-ün/-un	oqun	with arrow
Comitative (Note: Out of all Turkic languages, today this case is preserved only in Sakha (i.e. Yakut).)	-lagu/-legü/-ligü/-lïgu (Note: Used in Orkhon Turkic. This archaic suffix was already rare by the time of Orkhon Turkic and the usage of this case with pronouns is not attested in all varieties of Old Turkic.) -lügün/-lugun (Note: This suffix was used in Manichaean Uyghur.)	iniligü	together with young brother
Similative	-layu/-leyü	yultuzlayu	like star(s)

=== Grammatical number ===
Old Turkic (like Modern Turkic) had 2 grammatical numbers: singular and plural. However, Old Turkic also formed collective nouns (a category related to plurals) by a separate suffix -aγun/-egün e.g. tayaγunuŋuz ‘your colts’. Unlike Modern Turkic, Old Turkic had 3 types of suffixes to denote plural:

- it/-ït/-üt/-ut/-at/-et/-t
- -an/-en
- -lar/-ler

Suffixes other than -lar/-ler were used for only a few words. In some descriptions, -it/-ït/-üt/-ut/-at/-et/-t and -an/en may also be treated as collective markers. -it/-ït/-üt/-ut/-at/-et/-t is used for titles of non-Turkic origin, e.g. tarqat ←tarqan 'free man' <Soghdian, tegit ←tegin 'prince' (of unknown origin). -s is a similar suffix, e.g. ïšbara-s 'lords' <Sanskrit īśvara. -an/-en is used for person, e.g. eren 'men, warriors' ←er 'man', oγlan ←oγul 'son'.

Today, all Modern Turkic languages (except for Chuvash) exclusively use the suffix -lar/-ler for plural marking.

=== Verb ===
Finite verb forms in Old Turkic (i.e. verbs to which a tense suffix is added) always conjugate for person and number of the subject by corresponding suffixes save for the 3rd person, in which case person suffix is absent. This grammatical configuration is preserved in the majority of Modern Turkic languages, except for some such as Yellow Uyghur in which verbs no longer agree with the person of the subject.

=== Tense ===
Old Turkic had a complex system of tenses, which could be divided into six simple and derived tenses, the latter formed by adding special (auxiliary) verbs to the simple tenses.

Old Turkic simple tenses according to M. Erdal's classification
Tense	Positive	Negative
Imperfect Aorist	-ür/-ur	-maz/-mez
Preterite (Simple Past)	-di/-dï	-madï/-medi
Perfect Participle	-miš/-mïš	-madoq/-medoq (Note: Today, this form is preserved by two distinct branches of Turkic: Oghuz and the "Lena Group" of Turkic (Sakha and Dolgan, in the form -батах).)
Future	-tačï/-teči/-dačï/-deči	-mačï/-meči
Vivid Past	-yoq	-mayoq/-meyoq
Imminent Future	-γalïr/-gelir	

=== Hapax legomena ===
Some suffixes are attested as being attached to only one word and no other instance of attachment is to be found. Similarly, some words are attested only once in the entire extant Old Turkic corpus.

=== Denominal ===
The following have been classified by Gerard Clauson as denominal noun suffixes.

Suffix	Usages	Translation
-ča/-če	anča	thus, like that
-qa/-ke	sigirke yipke	sinew string/thread
-la/-le	ayla tünle körkle	thus, like that yesterday, night, north beautiful
-sük/-suq	baγïrsuq	(internal) organs
-ra/-re	ičre	inside, within
-ya/-ye	berye yïrya	here north
-čil/-čïl	igčil	sickly
-γïl/-gil	üčgil qïrγïl	triangular grey haired
-nti/-ntï	ekkinti	second
-dam/-dem	teŋridem	god-like
-tirti/-tïrtï	ičtirti	inside, within
-ki/-qï	ašnuqï üzeki ebdeki	former (being) on or above being in the house
-an/-en	oγlan eren	children men, gentlemen
-γu/-gü	enčgü tuzγu buγraγu	tranquil, at peace food given to a traveller as a gift being like a camel stud, aggressive
-aγu/-egü	üčegü ičegü	three together being inside human body, internal organ
-taŋ/-teŋ/-daŋ/-deŋ and -tüŋ /-tuŋ/-düŋ/-duŋ	ottuŋ izdeŋ	firewood track, trace
-ar/-er	birer azar	one each a few
-layu/-leyü	börileyü	like a wolf
-taš/-teš/-daš/-deš	qarïndaš yerdeš	kinsman compatriot
-miš/-mïš	altmïš yetmiš	sixty seventy
-γay/-gey	küčgey turγay	violent skylark
čaq/-cek and -čük/-čuq	ïγïrčaq	spindle-whorl
-q/-k (after vowels and -r) -aq/-ek (the normal forms) -ik/-ïq/-ük/-uq (rare forms)	ortuq	partner
-taq/-tek/-daq/-dek and -tük/-tuq/-dük/-duq	baγïrdaq beligdek burunduq	wrap terrifying nose ring
-γuk/-gük	čamγuq	objectionable
-maq/-mek	kögüzmek	breastplate
mük/-emük/-muq/-amuq	solamuq	left-handed (pejorative?)
-naq/-nek	baqanaq	"frog in a horse's hoof" (from baqa frog)
-dürük/-duruq	boyunduruq	yoke

=== Deverbal ===
The following have been classified by Gerard Clauson as deverbal suffixes.

Suffix	Usages	Translation
-a/-e/-i/-ï/-ü/-u	oprï adrï keče egri köni ötrü	hollow, valley branched, forked evening, night crooked straight, upright, lawful then, so
-γa/-ge	qïsγa öge bilge kölige tilge	short wise wise shadow slice
-γma/-gme	tanïγma	riddle, denial
-či/-čï	otačï oqïčï	healer priest, preacher
-γučï/-güči	ayγučï bitigüči	councilor scribe
-di/-dï/-ti/-tï	üdründi ögdi alqadï sökti arïtï uzatï tüketi	chosen, parted, separated, scattered praised praised brancompletely, clean lengthily completely
-tü/-tu/-dü/-du	egdü umdu süktü	curved knife desire, covetousness campaigning
-gü/-γu	bilegü kedgü oγlaγu	whetstone clothing gently nurtured
iŋgü/-ïŋγu	biliŋgü etiŋgü yeriŋgü salïŋγu	being in the know being prepared disgusted sling
-γač/-geč	qïšγač	pincers
-güč/-γuč	bičgüč	scissors
-mač/-meč	tutmač	"saved" noodle dish
-güt/-γut	alpaγut bayaγut	warrior merchant

== Numbers ==
Number	Old Turkic	Turkish	Uzbek	Kyrgyz	Yakut
1	bīr	bir	bir	бир	биир
2	ekki	iki	ikki	эки	икки
3	üč	üç	uç	үч	үс
4	tȫrt	dört	tört	төрт	түөрт
5	bēš	beş	beş	беш	биес
6	alttï	altı	oltti	алты	алта
7	yetti	yedi	yetti	жети	сетте
8	sekkiz	sekiz	sakkiz	сегиз	аҕыс
9	toqqïz	dokuz	töqqiz	тогуз	тоҕус
10	ōn	on	on	он	уон
20	yegirmi	yirmi	yigirma	жыйырма	сүүрбе
30	ottïz	otuz	öttiz	отуз	отут
40	qïrq	kırk	qirq	кырк	түөрт уон
50	ellig	elli	ellik	элүү	биес уон
60	altmïš	altmış	oltmiş	алтмыш	алта уон
70	yetmiš	yetmiş	yetmiş	жетмиш	сетте уон
80	seksen	seksen	sakson	сексен	аҕыс уон
90	toqsan	doksan	töqson	токсан	тоҕус уон
100	yǖz	yüz	yuz	жүз	сүүс
1000	miŋ	bin	ming	мың	тыһыынча

Ordinal numbers were formed by adding the suffix -inti/-ïntï to the cardinal forms, e.g birinti “first” (cf. Turkish birinci).

Old Turkic possessed an anticipatory counting system, in which the number in the ones place represents how many counting steps have been taken towards the upcoming number in the tens place, rather than how many counting steps have been taken from the current number in the tens place as in most human languages. In this system, the number in the ones place is placed before the number in the tens place. As an example, üč yegirmi did not mean “23” (3 steps from 23) but rather “13” (3 steps towards 20); likewise toqqïz ellig meant “49” not “59”. This counting system has been lost in all modern Turkic languages (except Western Yugur), which instead utilize a successive counting system, e.g Uzbek yigirma uç “23” and ellik töqqiz “59”.

== Sample Text ==
The following is a sample text in the Old Turkic runic script taken from the Kül Tigin Inscription, erected circa 732 AD in the Orkhon Valley, Mongolia, with transliteration into the Latin script and translation into English provided below.

𐱅𐰭𐰼𐰃 : 𐱅𐰏 : 𐱅𐰭𐰼𐰃𐰓𐰀 : 𐰉𐰆𐰞𐰢𐱁 : 𐱅𐰇𐰼𐰜 : 𐰋𐰃𐰠𐰏𐰀 : 𐰴𐰍𐰣 : 𐰉𐰆 : 𐰇𐰓𐰚𐰀 : 𐰆𐰞𐰺𐱃𐰢 : 𐰽𐰉𐰢𐰣 : 𐱅𐰇𐰚𐱅𐰃 : 𐰾𐰃𐰓𐰏𐰠 : 𐰆𐰞𐰖𐰆 : 𐰃𐰤 : 𐰘𐰏𐰇𐰤𐰢 : 𐰆𐰍𐰞𐰣𐰢 : 𐰋𐰃𐰼𐰚𐰃 : 𐰆𐰍𐱁𐰢 : 𐰉𐰆𐰑𐰣𐰢 : 𐰋𐰃𐰼𐰘𐰀 : 𐱁𐰑𐰯𐰃𐱃 : 𐰋𐰏𐰠𐰼 : 𐰘𐰃𐰺𐰖𐰀 : 𐱃𐰺𐰴𐱃 : 𐰉𐰆𐰖𐰺𐰸 : 𐰋𐰏𐰠𐰼 : 𐰆𐱃𐰔 : 𐱃𐱃𐰺

Transliteration:

Teŋri teg teŋride bolmïš türk bilge qaγan bu ödke olurtïm. Sabïmïn tüketi ešidgil ulayu in yegünüm oγlanïm biriki uγušum bodunum beriye šadapït begler yïrïya tarqat buyruq begler ottïz tatar…

IPA Transcription:

[teŋˈɾi ˈteɣ teŋɾiˈðe boɫˈmɯʃ ˈtyɾk bilˈɡe qɑˈʁɑn ˈbu øðˈke oɫuɾˈtɯm ‖ sɑβɯˈmɯn tykeˈti eʃiðˈɣil uɫɑˈju ˈin jeɣyˈnym oʁɫɑˈnɯm biɾiˈki uʁuˈʃum boðuˈnum beɾiˈje ʃɑðɑˈpɯt beɣˈleɾ jɯɾɯˈjɑ tɑɾˈqɑt bujˈɾuq otˈtɯz tɑˈtɑɾ]

Translation:

I, the Heavenly and Heaven-born Turkic Bilge Kagan, succeeded to the throne at this time. Hear my words from the beginning to the end, first of all you, my younger brothers and my sons, and my folks and relatives, you, Šadapït lords to the south, Tarqat and Buyruq lords to the north, you, Otuz Tatar…

== Media ==
=== Literary works ===
- Yenisei Inscriptions (8-10th centuries CE) - a group of texts in Old Turkic from Yenisei River basin.
- Uyuk-Tarlak inscription (date unknown) by an unknown writer (in Yenisei Kyrgyz)
- Elegest inscription (date unknown) by an unknown writer (in Yenisei Kyrgyz)
- Orkhon Inscriptions (732 and 735) by Yollıg Khagan (in Orkhon Turkic)
- Bain Tsokto inscriptions (716) by an unknown writer (in Orkhon Turkic)
- Ongin inscription (between 716 and 735) by an unknown writer (in Orkhon Turkic)
- Kul-chur inscription (between 723 and 725) a writer called "Ebizter" (in Orkhon Turkic)
- Altyn Tamgan Tarhan inscription (724) by an unknown writer (in Orkhon Turkic)
- Tariat inscriptions (between 753 and 760) by an unknown writer (in Old Uyghur)
- Choiti-Tamir inscriptions (between 753 and 756) by an unknown writer (in Old Uyghur)
- Sükhbaatar inscriptions (8th century) by an unknown writer (in Old Uyghur)
- Bombogor inscription (8th century) by an unknown writer (in Old Uyghur)
- Book of Divination (9th century) by an unknown writer (in Old Uyghur)

== See also ==
- Old Turkic script
- Proto-Turkic
- Orkhon Turkic
- Old Uyghur
- Karakhanid language
