= Payna =

Winter festival in Turkic Tengrism and Altai folklore

Payna or Paynaqan is a winter feast and festival Turkic Tengrism and Altai folklore. Arranged for the goddess that called Payna. So this is a blessing, fertility and abundance ceremony.

== Description ==
Payna was a mythological female character associated with winter and snow time in early Turkic mythology, particularly within Altai, Siberia and Central Asia. She is also a proctor spirit of pine tree. Along with her male companion Pakta (autumn spirit), she was associated with rituals conducted in rural areas during winter. The word "Payna" is still the poetic word for "abundance" in the Altai language, as well as Old Turkic. Hence she is an abundance goddess. Also, Payna is a word related with name of the goddess Baianai. The goddess Umay is sometimes relevant to this term.

In Turkic mythology, the beautiful woman called "Payna" lived on atop mountains, where they discussed the fate of crops and of human inhabitants. When she would travel in wooden carts down to the valley below. Only certain people were capable of hearing them singing.

== Sources ==
- (in Turkish) Türk Mitolojisi Sözlüğü, Pınar Karaca (Payne)

== See also ==
- Paktaqan
- Nardoqan
- Sayaqan
- Kosaqan
- Bai Baianai
