= Nuru Bayramov =

Azerbaijani surgeon and professor (born 1963)

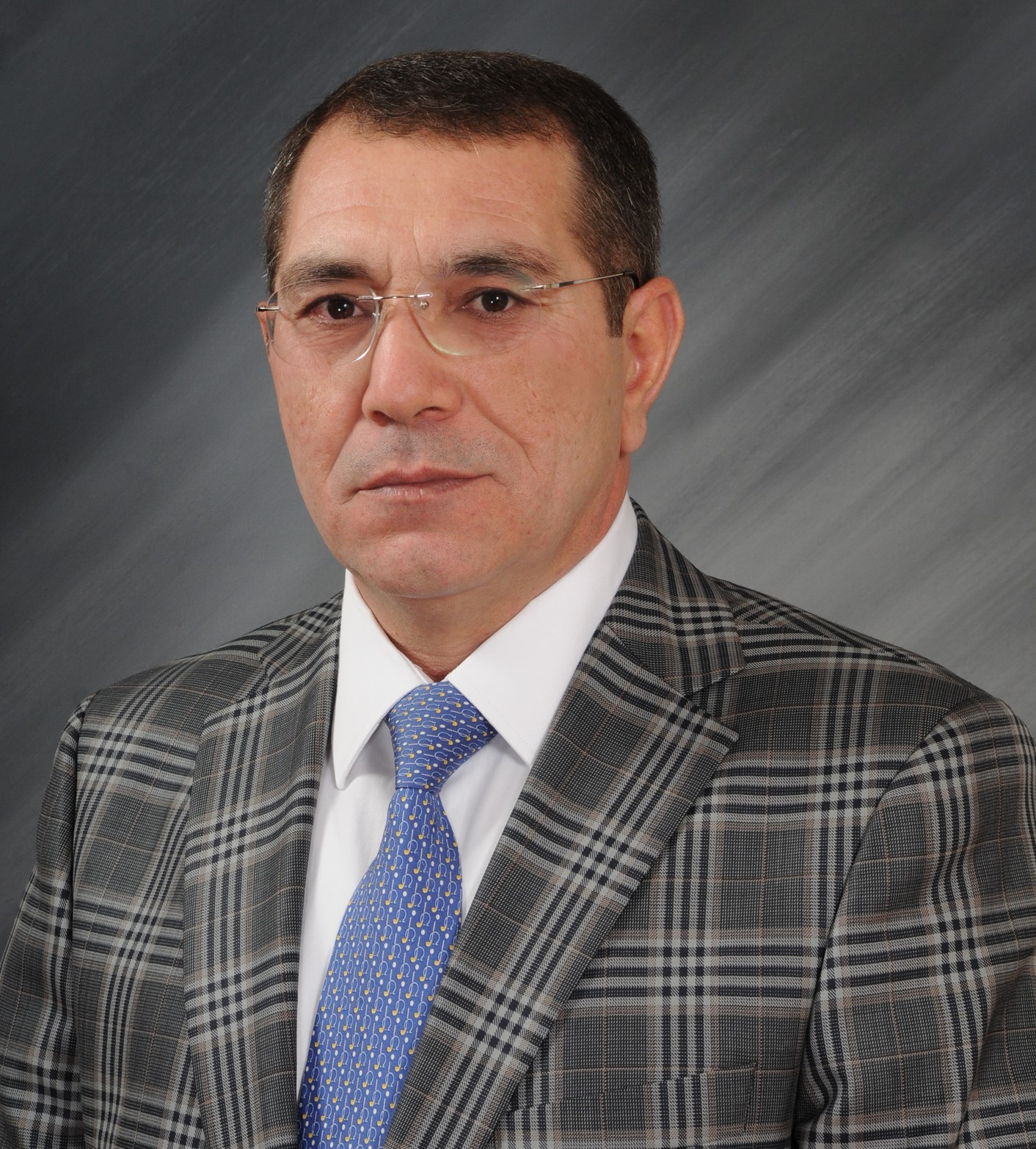
- Bayramov in 2015
- Born: Azerbaijani: Nuru Yusif oğlu Bayramov; 17 September 1963 (age 62); Narimanli, Basargechar raion, Armenian SSR
- Education: Azerbaijan State Medical Institute
- Scientific career
- Fields: Surgery, organ transplantation, hepatology
- Workplaces: Azerbaijan Medical University

Nuru Bayramov (Azerbaijani: Nuru Yusif oğlu Bayramov; born 1963) is a surgeon, a professor and head of first department of surgical diseases in Azerbaijan Medical University.

== Early life, education and career ==
Nuru Bayramov was born on 17 September 1963 in the Narimanli village of Basargechar region of Goycha. He went to Narimanli Village Secondary School in 1970, and after graduating from high school in 1980, entered the first year of treatment and prevention faculty of Azerbaijan Medical University in the same year. He graduated from the faculty with honors from Lenin and majoring in surgery.

From 1986 to 1988, he passed a clinical internship at the first Department of Surgical Diseases of the Azerbaijan Medical University. In 1991 he entered the postgraduate course and completed his postgraduate study at the I.M. Sechenov First Moscow State Medical University with a degree in Research Doctor.

In 1991, Nuru Bayramov received his Doctor of Philosophy (PhD) in Medicine degree in I.M. Sechenov First Moscow State Medical University where he defended his thesis on "Application of combined lasers in the treatment of chronic osteomyelitis".

From 1991 to 1994, he worked as the associate professor assistant of the first Department of Surgical Diseases of the Azerbaijan Medical University. During the first Karabakh War, he was active in providing surgical treatment in Tartar military hospital and introduced innovative treatment methods for cold related injuries during the Khojaly Massacre.

In 1994 he was sent to the Republic of Turkey to conduct scientific research on liver surgery and transplantation and to practice laparoscopic, gastrointestinal, and oncologic surgery. Until 2000, he had done research and practice at the Advanced Specialty Hospital of Turkey, Organ Transplant Hospital of Başkent University and Department of Surgical Oncology of Ankara University.

Between the years of 1996 and 1998, he served as an associate professor in the Department of General Surgery of Van Yüzüncü Yıl University and Kırıkkale University.

In 1999, he defended his thesis on “Prediction and prevention of complications after liver resection” and received his degree of Doctor in Medical Sciences. In 2000 he was supervising the doctors and nurses of Central Clinic Hospital who were sent to expertise in Turkey. Since 2001, he has been active in the organization of Central Clinical Hospital and Central Customs Hospital, personnel training, establishment of general, laparoscopic, hepatobiliary, and transplant surgery.

In 2001 he served as associate professor in the first Department of Surgical Diseases of Azerbaijan Medical University, in 2004 as a full professor; and in 2012 he was elected head of the department. Between the years of 2015 and 2016, he directed the Surgical Education Hospital of Azerbaijan Medial University. In 2014, he was elected a correspondent member of the Azerbaijan National Academy of Sciences.

Between 2018 and 2020, as a member of the working group in the Health Committee of the National Assembly of Azerbaijan, he actively participated in the development of the legislation "Donation and Transplantation of Human Organs.

In 2020, he took an active part in the training, organization and implementation of surgical services to the wounded of the 2020 Nagorno-Karabakh war at the Azerbaijan Medical University's clinic of surgery, the Central Hospital of the State Customs Committee (Azerbaijan) and central hospital of State Security Service (Azerbaijan). Between 2020 and 2021, he provided consulting assistance in solving surgical, transplantation and hepatological problems in patients with coronavirus, participated in the organization of scientific and practical activities.

== Activities ==
=== Scientific activity ===
Nuru Bayramov's scientific career started in his student days. He has been a member of the Student Scientific Community since the third year of the university, the chairman of the Student Scientific Society of the Faculty of Treatment and Prevention between 1984 and 1986, and has repeatedly spoken at conferences of Student Scientific Societies in Azerbaijan and various countries of the USSR. While he was a student, he published 11 scientific papers. Given his excellent studentship and active involvement in research, he was awarded the Lenin Scholarship, the highest scholarship of the institute, in 1985. He continued his scientific activity during clinical internship and received a patent certificate for the new treatment of Pilonidal sinus disease.

His later research activity continued between 1988 and 1991 as a postgraduate study in Department of General Surgery in I.M. Sechenov First Moscow State Medical University. He has done scientific work on the use of lasers in surgery under the guidance of professors V.I. Gostishev and V.A. Vertyanov.

Between 1991 and 1994, he continued research of the use of lasers and water-soluble based ointments for treatment of gunshot and cold injuries in Azerbaijan Medical University. Results of these studies were published in some articles and doctoral theses.

His next research activity continued from 1994 to 2000 at the Advanced Specialty Hospital of Turkey, Başkent University, Ankara University and Van Yüzüncü Yıl University. In addition to being specialized in these education and research centers, he has performed clinical and experimental studies on transplantation, liver resection, and laparoscopic surgery. Liver resection in live donors, water-jet for liver resection, (CUSA) and argon coagulation in the cirrhotic liver resection, effects of lasers and dalargin on liver regeneration, liver regeneration after resection, prevention of postresection complications, complication after laparoscopic surgery, classification of the gunshot injuries of the liver have been his main research topics of this period. He conducted an experimental study on the use of waterjet in liver resection at the Van Yüzüncü Yıl University in 1997 and was able to specify some parameters of the water jet (diameter and pressure). Several articles and one doctoral thesis on this topic are defended.

As a result of clinical and experimental studies on liver resection and transplantation he has published 2 monographs and 31 articles. In 1999 he defended his thesis on "Prediction and prevention of complications after liver resection" and received a scientific degree of "Doktor Nauk in Medical Sciences".

Back in 2000, Nuru Bayramov returned to Azerbaijan, where he previously worked as an associate professor at the Azerbaijan Medical University, and currently head of the Department of I Surgical Diseases. The main areas of his research during this period are liver resection, liver and kidney transplantation, laparoscopic and metabolic surgery, stem cells and genetic studies. Under his leadership, dissertations have been defended on the topics of laparoscopic appendectomy, laparoscopic fundoplication, laparoscopic biliary tract examinations, laparoscopic choledochal surgeries, laparoscopic hernia repair, laparoscopic simultaneous surgeries, stem cells in colon polyps, gene polymorphism in colon cancer, elastography and iodine polymers in thyroid nodules. Dissertation work is ongoing on biliary complications in liver transplantation, microRNAs, liver dysfunction and histones, elastography in liver pathologies, application of artificial intelligence, and bariatric surgeries in obesity. Grant projects on gene polymorphism in cirrhosis, elastography and fatty liver have been adopted. For the first time in Azerbaijan, it was used by stem cells for liver disease.

He has been active in scientific and organizational work in Azerbaijan and around the world. In Azerbaijan he actively participated in defining and promoting pillar priorities of medical science (stem cells and regenerative medicine, genomics, molecular biology, high technologies and medicine, evidence-based medicine, translational medicine, etc.). He has been organizing 5-6 international conferences every year since 2014, including Baku-Malatya Transplant Days, Turkey-Azerbaijan Hepatology Course, and regular conferences on bariatric surgery, endocrine surgery, colorectal surgery.

He is the founder and first president of the Transcaspian International Society of Hepato-Pancreato-Biliary Surgeons. By January 2026, he participated in 271 congresses (participation in 107 congresses, 111 speeches, organization of 53 congresses), published more than 500 works (51 books, 14 methodological recommendations, 253 articles, 252 theses). The scientist is the author of 14 inventions and rationalization proposals. Under his guidance, 8 dissertations were defended. He is a participant in about 20 international multicenter studies. His Hi index as of 03.01.2026 is 12 on Google Scholar, 8 on Research Gate, 7 on Scpopus, and 5 on Web of Science. He is a participant in two grant projects. He is currently continuing his research on organ transplantation, laparoscopic, metabolic surgery, genetics, artificial intelligence, stem cells, and multicenter research.

=== Practical activities ===
Nuru Bayramov has actively involved in the process of modernization and development of clinical, scientific medicine and medical education in Azerbaijan. In the 1990s, he was involved in advanced care of victims in the first Karabakh War and in frontline military hospitals. He has taken active part in the treatment of civilians who were forced to leave their homes in the Khojaly Massacre in 1992 and had frostbite of their hands and feet and successfully implemented a new method of treatment. In January 1994, he worked at the Military Desert Hospital No. 2 in Tartar region and treated numerous wounded soldiers.

He also took an active part in the training, organization and implementation of surgical services to the wounded of the 2020 Nagorno-Karabakh war at the Azerbaijan Medical University's clinic of Surgery, the Central Hospital of the State Customs Committee (Azerbaijan) and central hospital of State Security Service (Azerbaijan).

He has been active in the organization of general, laparoscopic and liver surgery at Van Yüzüncü Yıl University and Kırıkkale University.

He has been pioneering in the development and implementation of international clinical protocols, laying the foundations of laparoscopic, transplantation, liver and bariatric-metabolic surgery in Azerbaijan.

He has actively participated in establishment of laparoscopyc, transplantation centers and realization of the liver and kidney transplantation in prime hospitals in Azerbaijan such as, Central Clinic Hospital, M. Naghiyev Emergency and Medical Care Hospital, Central Customs Hospital and Azerbaijan Medical University Surgical Educational Hospital.

He has broken grounds in healthcare industry in Azerbaijan by leading first stem cell transplantation, major liver resections, hepatectomy including (ALPPS) surgery, damage control surgery, laparostomy and mesh closure surgery, advanced laparoscopic operations such as, common bile duct exploration and resection, choledocho-duodenostomy, choledocho-yeyunostomy, fundoplication, liver, pancreas, gastric, bowel, colon resections, portal vein ligations, gasto-yeyunostomy, splenectomy, hysterectomy, cystectomy, renal operations and sympathectomy, thoracoscopic phrenic nervectomy (first time in the world) and first organ transplantation in Azerbaijan Medical University (2015).

His initiate surgeons have an important role in the development and wide application of laparoscopic surgery in Azerbaijan and around the world.

Nuru Bayramov was a participant and international expert at “Live transplantation for five patients at the same time” held at Inonu University's Liver Transplantation Institute (Malatya, Turkey) which was awarded and granted by Guinness World Records Title.

=== Pedagogical activities ===
Nuru Bayramov started his pedagogical activities at General Surgery Department in I.M. Sechenov First Moscow State Medical University the continued in Azerbaijan Medical University (1991–1994), Van Yüzüncü Yıl University (1996–1997), Kırıkkale University (1998) and Azerbaijan Medical University from 1999 until today. Currently he is head of first Department of Surgical Diseases.

He was also actively involved in modernizing the surgical education of students and residents in Azerbaijan. Under his leadership, a modern educational program for students and residents has been developed for the first time in our country. Including a curriculum for Surgical Diseases and Military Surgery, an online surgical textbook, and an online portal named bck.az. Also, for the first time in the world, a multilingual and multifunctional educational portal called "Surgical Platform" have been developed. Compiled electronic versions of teaching materials, including lectures, practical topics, operating techniques and test questions, started using multimedia tools, organized interactive morning lessons and concerts, developed surgical patient examination and treatment protocols, open to students and residents. laparoscopic surgical training courses, courses abroad and online.

== Important scientific findings and innovations ==
=== Regarding laser ===
- It has been found that there are two principles of the effect of blood red laser irradiation on the immune system: the stimulated immune system is suppressed, and the suppressed system is stimulated; This effect reaches a maximum of 3–4 days and disappears after 7 days. Based on this, a method of prediction has been developed (1990).
- Laser radiation of blood has a corrective effect on the coagulation system and has a positive effect on liver regeneration (1990).
- Water-soluble based ointments and red laser irradiation of intravascular blood are useful for early management of frostbite (1992).

=== Regarding liver surgery ===
- In cirrhotic liver resections combined application of CUSA (Cavitron Ultrasonic Surgical Aspirator) and argon beam coagulator is more useful than alone (1996).
- Parameters (diameter and pressure) of water-jet for liver resection have been specified (1997).
- The dynamics of post-resection regeneration of normal and cirrhotic liver have been identified (1996).
- The regeneration stimulators have little effect on normal liver regeneration, but it is needed for cirrhotic and hepatitis livers and for this purpose the blood laser irradiation may be useful (1996).
- Intraoperative indocyanine green test is useful for prediction of posthepatectomy liver failure. (1996).
- Experimental models of liver cysts and abscesses have been developed (1996).
- Open and laparoscopic surgery causes subclinical liver damage and dysfunction in obese patients and predisposes to complications (2020).
- Histones may be a biomarker for early detection of liver dysfunction following live donor resections and liver transplantation (2021).

=== Regarding transplantation ===
- The most common complications in the living liver donors are the biliary complications, most of which are of a mild degree (2012).
- Biliary complications in live liver transplantation represent a serious problem (up to 30%), and anti-ischemic and distal transanastomotic drainage procedures are useful in surgical prophylaxis (2012).
- Liver transplantation may be the first choice in patients with hepatocellular carcinoma and cirrhosis (2010).
- Liver transplantation is possible in some diseases of the liver (portal vein thrombosis, vascular alveolar echinococcosis) (2014).
- Electron microscopy discovered advanced fat in hepatocytes of liver donors, who was seemed normal on standard clinical, laboratory and imaging studies. The clinical significance of this result should be explored in future studies (2015).
- There is a negative correlation between plasma levels of extracellular histones after donor hepatectomies and liver function, and histone levels 24 hours postoperatively may be a predictor of postsectional hepatic dysfunction (2021).
- COVID-19 infection is more common in renal and hepatic recipients than in the general population, with higher lethality, male sex, steroid failure, and invasive ventilation may be risk factors for lethality (2021).
- To solve the problem of incompatibility between the donor and the recipient, it is necessary to carry out donor exchange. Preliminary studies conducted at the Institute of Liver Transplantation show that it is possible to exchange donors with a computer program, to find three or five suitable donor-recipient pairs and to perform their operations on the same day. (2023)
- The history of transplantation in Azerbaijan has been investigated and recorded. (2022)
- The study highlights the significant disparities in LDLT practices and short-term outcomes across HDI levels, emphasizing the need for global cooperation to standardize practices and enhance care quality to ensure equitable access to liver transplantation worldwide. (2025)
- This is the first global study to show evidence that robotic living donor hepatectomy offers superior short-term outcomes compared with laparoscopic and open approaches. Although open surgery remains the most common approach, robotic techniques show promise for improving donor safety and recovery. (2025)

=== Regarding laparoscopic surgery ===
- Wide dissection of the Calot's triangle and adherence to the “two-window” principle with artery ligation first significantly decreases complications and may be referred as standard technique for laparoscopic cholecystectomy (1997).
- Early (within 24 hours) laparoscopic surgery in acute cholecystitis is more effective, even in patients with cirrhosis (1998).
- Endoscopic stend and drainage are effective first-step options for partial biliary duct injury (1999).
- In patients with cholecysto-choledocholithiasis one-stage laparoscopic common bile duct exploration and cholecystectomy has surgical and economical advantage over two-stage approach. (2003)
- Laparoscopic approach decrease complications and hospital stay in both complicated and uncomplicated appendectomies. (2003)
- Simultaneous laparoscopic operations of two or more surgical pathologies in the abdominal cavity reduces overall complications and does not increase specific complications (2004).
- Laparoscopic approach is first choice for treatment of hydatid cysts irrespective of number, complication and location, and the intraoperative ultrasound facilitates this work (2004).
- Laparoscopic hernioplasty significantly decreases wound complication rate and may refer as first choice for treatment of postoperative abdominal hernias. (2002)
- Laparoscopic fundoplication reduce recurrence of Barret's esophagus and may reverse metaplasia (2006).
- The results of surgical care for the wounds of the 2020 Nagorno-Karabakh war showed that mine explosions cause numerous and extensive injuries, early negative-pressure wound therapy, autodermoplasty and laparoscopic restoration of colostomy accelerate rehabilitation (2021).
- Three decades of experience with 4572 laparoscopic cholecystectomies demonstrate that adherence to a unified management protocol for LC, with periodic reviews and updates, significantly reduces postoperative mortality and the incidence of major complications, including biliary injury. Furthermore, this approach enables the safe performance of simultaneous laparoscopic procedures in patients with comorbidities, contributing to improved surgical outcomes in tertiary care settings. (2025)

=== Regarding stem cell ===
- Preliminary results have shown that bone marrow-derived autologous mesenchymal stem cells are a reliable method of direct (intraarterial) transplantation into the liver and can correct coagulopathy in severe cirrhosis and autoimmune hepatitis (2015, 2021).
- Studies of stem cells in colon polyps have shown that the number of stem cells (CD133 positive) in villous adenomas is greater than that of others and has higher potential for malignancy (2017).
- Research has shown that the majority of colon polyps contain stem cells, large in size, the number of cancerous stem cells in villi and dysplastic polyps increases and the risk of cancer increases (2021).

=== Regarding elastography ===
- Preliminary analysis of elastographic examinations shows that the splenic stiffness correlated with degree of portal hypertension and varicose vein. Based on this result, the splenic elastography may be used as a non-invasive test for assessment the severity of portal hypertension and bleeding risk (2017).
- The results of elastographic study of liver transplant patients show that after transplantation the stiffness of spleen has gradually reduced irrespective of complications, whereas stiffness of liver graft was stable in patients without complications, but increase in complicated cases. According to these preliminary results, graft elastography may be a useful tool for assessing and monitoring of post-transplant liver dysfunction and portal hypertension (2018).

=== Regarding artificial intellect ===
- An algorithm for the determination of stages of hepatocellular carcinoma was developed and proved to be useful. (2023)
- Large-scale international survey highlights medical, dental, and veterinary students' positive perceptions of AI in healthcare, their strong desire for AI education, and the current lack of AI teaching in medical curricula worldwide. The study identifies a need for integrating AI education into medical curricula, considering regional differences in perceptions and educational needs. (2024)
- In this cross-sectional study of patient attitudes toward AI use in health care across six continents, findings indicated that tailored AI implementation strategies should take patient demographics, health status, and preferences for explainable AI and physician oversight into account. (2025)

=== Regarding genetic ===
- A genetic study showed that the -579 G>T polymorphism in the DNMT3B gene has a protective role against colorectal cancer. (2021)
- Although no overall association was observed for hMLH1 −93G>A, our findings suggest a potential link with increased colorectal cancer risk under the recessive model in the Azerbaijani population. (2025)

== Scientific societies ==
Since 2006 Nuru Bayramov is a member of Scientific Council of the Medical Faculty and of Azerbaijan Medical University. Between the years of 2006 and 2014 he was member of “D.03.011” Dissertation Council. Since 2014 he has been Chairman of the Coordination Council for Medicine in Azerbaijan National Academy of Sciences and also Member of the Presidium of the Supreme Certifying Committee of Azerbaijan Republic since 2015.

Since 2016, he was Deputy Secretary of the Department of Biology and Medicine and a Member of the Bureau in Azerbaijan National Academy of Sciences.

From 2013 to 2019 he was chairman of Problem Commission Surgery in Azerbaijan Medical University.

=== International scientific societies ===
European Association for the Study of the Liver (EASL), European Association for Endoscopic Surgery (EAES), European Society for Organ Transplantation (ESOT), European Society for Colorectal Surgeons (ESCS), International Liver Transplant Society (ILTS), The Transplantation Society (TTS), International Association of Surgeons, Gastroenterologists, and Oncologists (IASGO), the International Federation for the Surgery of Obesity and Metabolic Disorders (IFSO), European Transluminal Surgery Society (EATS), Asian and Passific Association for the Study of the Liver (APASL), Clinical Robotic Surgery Association (CRSA) and Society of Gastroenterologists in Turkey. He is the president of the TransCaspian International Hepato-Pancreato-Biliary Surgeons Association (TransCaspian IHPBA).

== Books ==
1. Bayramov NY, Bayraktar Y, Janqabılov AK, Qadayev AQ, Rahişev AR, Salimgereeva BJ, et al. Türkdilli xalqların qastroenteroloji terminlər lüğəti [Internet]. Bayramov N, Bayraktar Y, editors. E-Book. Van: Yuzuncu Yıl Universitesi, Azərbaycan Tibb Universiteti; 1997. 40 p. Available from: http://bck.az/images/books/K-01.Turkdili xalqların qastroenteroloji terminlər lugeti (1997).pdf
2. Bayramov NY. Qaraciyər regenerasiyası [Internet]. Van: Print- Önder ofset. E-book-Azərbaycan Tibb Universiteti; 1997. 1–80 p. Available from: https://doi.org/10.25045/k.nurubay.qcreg
3. Sultanov HA, Məmmədov İM, Əşrəfov Ə.H., Qeybullayev AƏ., Rüstəmov Ə.M., Əliyeva TA, et al. Qarın boşluğu üzvlərinin təxirəsalınmaz cərrahlığı [Internet]. Baku: Print Yazıçı nəşriyyatı, E-book; 1998. 380 p. Available from: https://doi.org/10.25045/k.nurubay.qbtecilicerrahi
4. Bayramov NY. Qaraciyər rezeksiyası [Internet]. Ankara: Print-72 matba, E-book—Azərbaycan Tibb Universiteti; 1998. 248 p. Available from: http://bck.az/images/books/K-03. Qaraciyər rezeksiyası (1998).pdf
5. İnsanov Ə, Abbasov B, Abdullayev F, Ağayev B, Bayramov N, Vəliyev İ, et al. Kütləvi Tibb Ensklopediyası. Bakı: Azərbaycan Ensklopediyası NPB; 2000.
6. Bayramov NY, Mustafaoğlu F, Ekim H, Rzayev TM. Kardiovasküler Sözlük [Internet]. Bayramov NY, editor. Ankara: Print-72 matbaa, E-book; 2000. 50 p. Available from: http://bck.az/images/books/K-05. Kardiovaskulyar sozluk (2000).pdf
7. Bayramov NY. Mədəaltı vəzin cərrahi xəstəlikləri [Internet]. Ankara: Print -72-matbaa, elektron-Azerbaycan Tibb Universitesi; 2001. 225 p. Available from: http://bck.az/images/books/K-07. Mədəaltı vəzin cərrahi xəstəlikləri-tək fail (2002).pdf
8. Bayramov NY. Öd yollarının cərrahi xəstəlikləri [Internet]. Ankara: Print-Vektor, e-book-Azərbaycan Tibb Universiteti; 2004. 333 p. Available from: http://bck.az/images/books/K-08. Öd yollarının cərrahi xəstəlikləri tək fail (2004).pdf
9. Bayramov NY. Portal hipertenziya [Internet]. Baku: Print- Qismet, Elektron-Azerbaycan Tibb Universiteti; 2007. 138 p. Available from: http://bck.az/images/books/K-09. Portal hipertenziya (2007).pdf
10. Bayramov NY, Bayraktar Y, Zakirxocayev ŞY, Qadaev AQ, Hepgül K, Özden A, et al. Coxdilli anatomik luget [Internet]. Bayramov NY, editor. Vol. 1. Baku: Print – Oscar, ATXEM, Elektron-Azerbaycan Tibb Universiteti; 2008. 71 p. Available from: https://doi.org/10.25045/k.nurubay.anatomlugat
11. Bayramov NY. Cərrahiyyədən mühazirə slaydları [Internet]. Baku: Azerbaycan Tibb Universiteti; 2008. 785 p. Available from: http://bck.az/images/books/K-10. Cərrahiyyə mühazirələri slaydları tək faiı (2008).pdf
12. Bayramov NY. Təcili abdominal cərrahiyyədə müayinə və müalicə qaydaları [Internet]. Baku: Qismət, Author; 2009. 138 p. Available from: https://doi.org/10.25045/k.nurubay.tecilicerr
13. Bayramov NY, Rüstəm Ə.M., Əliyev EA. Şərəfli ömürün səhifələri: Professor Həsən Abbas oğlu Sultanov. Bakı: Azərbaycan Tibb Universiteti, UniPrint; 2012. 94 p.
14. Bayramov N. Qalxanvari vəzin cərrahi xəstəlikləri [Internet]. Baku: Print-Təbib, Elektron-Azerbaycan Tibb Universitesi; 2012. 114 p. Available from: https://doi.org/10.25045/k.nurubay.tiroidcerrahi
15. Yılmaz S, Bayramov NY, Kayaalp C, Məmmədov R, Novruzov N. Canlıdan qaraciyər transplantasiyasında əməliyytdan əvvəl və sonrakı müayinə və müalicə qaydaları [Internet]. Baku: Print-Qismet, E-book; 2012. 132 p. Available from: http://bck.az/images/books/K-16. Qaraciyər transplanatsiyası (2012) PDF.pdf
16. Bayramov NY. Qaraciyərin Cərrahi Xəstəlikləri [Internet]. Baku: Print-Qismət, Elektron- Azerbaycan Tibb Universiteti; 2012. 327 p. Available from: https://doi.org/10.25045/k.nurubay.qccerrahi
17. Bayramov NY. Canlıdan Qaraciyər Transplantasiyası (məlumat kitabı) [Internet]. Baku: E-book; 2015. 38 p. Available from: http://bck.az/images/books/K-18. Qaraciyər translantasiyası əl kitabı (2015).pdf
18. Bayramov NY, Aslanova KD, Əliyev EA, Əliyev RY, Əliyev SA, Əliyev TQ, et al. Cərrahi xəstəliklər-I hissə [Internet]. 1st ed. Bayramov NY, editor. Baku: Elektron- Azərbaycan Tibb Universiteti; 2015. Available from: http://bck.az/images/books/K-19. Cərrahi xəstəliklər I hissə PDF.pdf
19. Bayramov NY. Cərrahi xəstəliklər üzrə klinik və praktik səriştələr [Internet]. 1st-st ed. Baku: Elektron-Azərbaycan Tibb Universiteti; 2016. 77 p. Available from: https://doi.org/10.25045/k.nurubay.cseriste
20. Bayramov NY. Düz bağırsaq və anal nahiyənin cərrahi xəstəlikləri [Internet]. Baku: Print-Təbib, Elektron-Azərbaycan Tibb Universiteti; 2016. 127 p. Available from: https://doi.org/10.25045/k.nurubay.analc
21. Bayramov NY. Nazik bağırsağın cərrahi xəstəlikləri [Internet]. Bayramov NY, editor. Baku: Təbib, Azerbaycan Tibb Universiteti; 2016. 173 p. Available from: https://doi.org/10.25045/k.nurubay.nazikbc
22. Bayramov NY. Akademik Əhliman Tapdıq oğlu Əmiraslanov [Internet]. Bayramov NY, Əkbərov Z, editors. Baku: Elm nəşriyyatı; 2017. 270 p. Available from: https://doi.org/10.25045/k.nurubay.amiraslanov
23. Bayramov NY, Mahmudov MG, Hüseynova MR. Cərrahi xəstəliklər və hərbi səhra cərrahiyyəsi fənni üzrə tədris proqramı [Internet]. Bayramov NY, editor. Baku: Azərbaycan Tibb Universiteti; 2018. 82 p. Available from: https://doi.org/10.25045/k.nurubay.cerproq
24. Bayramov NY. Cərrahi xəstəliklər. 2-ci nəşr [Internet]. 2nd ed. Bayramov Nuru, editor. Baku: Azərbaycan Tibb Universiteti; 2019. 2163 p. Available from: http://bck.az/images/books/K-24. Cərrahi xəstəliklər. II nəşr. Nuru Bayramov.pdf
25. Bayramov NY, Zeynalov B, Ömərov T, Şirinova X. Abdominal cərrahi patologiyalara yanaşma qaydaları [Internet]. 1st ed. Baku: Azərbaycan Tibb Universiteti; 2019. 562 p. Available from: http://bck.az/images/books/K-28. Abdominal cərrahiyyədə qaydalar.pdf
26. Bayramov NY. Tibbi tədqiqatlrın piroritet istiqamətləri və sahələri [Internet]. 1st ed. Bayramov NY, editor. Baku: AMEA, Azərbaycan Respublikası Elmi Tədqiqatların Əlaqələndirilmə Şurası, Klinik, Regenerator və Translyason Təbabət üzrə Elmi Şurası; 2020. 1–16 p. Available from: http://bck.az/images/books/K-27. Tibbi tədqiqatların piroritet istiqamətləri və sahələri.pdf
27. Bayramov N. Annotasiyaların tərtibat qaydaları [Internet]. Baku: AMEA, Azərbaycan Respublikası Elmi Tədqiqatların Əlaqələndirilmə Şurası; 2020. 52 p. Available from: http://bck.az/images/books/K-26. Annotasiya yazmaq üçün metodik göstəriş.pdf
28. Bayramov NY, Аббасов АГ, Асланова КД, Ахмедов АМ, Ахмедов ФФ, Алиев ЭА, et al. Хирургические болезни [Internet]. 3rd ed. Bayramov NY, editor. Baku, Istanbul: Azərbaycan Tibb Universiteti; 2020. 695 p. Available from: http://bck.az/images/books/xirurgicheskie-bolezni.pdf
29. Bayramov N, Bayramova T, Isazade E, Mammadov R, Namazov A, Guliyev O. Canlı böyrək donorlarının müayinə və müalicə qaydaları [Internet]. Baku: Azərbaycan Tibb Universiteti; 2022. 62 p. Available from: http://bck.az/images/books/K-31-Canli-boyrek-donorlari-protokolu.pdf
30. Bayramov N, Rüstəm Ədalət, Əliyev E. Örnək İnsan: Professor Həsən Sultanov [Internet]. Baku: Azərbaycan Tibb Universiteti; 2022. Available from: https://bck.az/images/books/K-37-sultanov-q.pdf
31. Bayramov N, Sultanov H, Rüstəm Ədalət. Azərbaycan Tibb Universitetinin I Cərrahi Xəstəliklər Kafedrasının 100 illik tarixi [Internet]. Baku: Azərbaycan Tibb Universiteti; 2022. Available from: https://www.researchgate.net/publication/365397775_Azrbaycan_Tibb_Universitetinin_I_Crrahi_Xstliklr_Kafedrasinin_100_illik_tarixi
32. Bayramov N, Əzimov E. Qarın boşluğunun odlu silah yaralanmalarına yanaşma prinsipləri [Internet]. Baku: Azərbaycan Tibb Universiteti; 2022. 50 p. Available from: https://www.researchgate.net/publication/362389687_Qarin_boslugunun_odlu_silah_yaralanmalarina_yanasma_prinsiplri%0A %0A
33. Bayramov NY, Əliyev S. Nekrozlaşdırıcı fassiit (epidemiologiyası, etiopatogenezi, klinikası, diaqnostikası, müalicəsi). [Internet]. 2022. 186 p. Available from: https://www.researchgate.net/publication/362392876_Nekrozlasdirici_fassiit_epidemiologiyasi_etiopatogenezi_klinikasi_diaqnostikasi_mualicsi
34. Bayramov N, Məmmədov R, Novruzov N, İsəzadə E, Bayramova T. Canlı qaraciyər donorlarının müayinəsi, müalicəsi və əməliyyatdan sonrakı izlənməsi qaydaları [Internet]. Baku: Azerbaycan Tibb Universiteti; 2022. 68 p. Available from: https://www.researchgate.net/publication/362395034_Canli_qaraciyr_donorlarinin_muayinsi_mualicsi_v_mliyyatdan_sonraki_izlnmsi_qaydalari
35. Bayramov N, Kələntərova N. Zeynal İba oğlu Əkpərov: biblioqrafik göstərici [Internet]. Bayramov N, Alisa S, Məmmədova A, editors. Baku: AMEA; 2023. 320 p. Available from: https://www.researchgate.net/publication/393663362_Zeynal_Iba_oglu_kprov_biblioqrafik_gostrici
36. Bayramov N, İsazadə E, Namazov A, Quliyev O, Bayramova T, Məmmədov R, et al. Köçürülən böyrəyin disfunksiyasında müayinə və müalicə qaydaları [Internet]. Bakı: Azerbaycan Tibb Universiteti; 2023. 27 p. Available from: https://www.researchgate.net/publication/399345838_Kocuruln_boyryin_disfunksiyasinda_muayin_v_mualic_qaydalari
37. Bayramov N, Ibrahimova A, Teymurov E, Suleymanova N, Mahmudov M, Huseynova M, et al. Cardiovasculary surgical diseases [Internet]. 1st ed. Bayramov N, editor. Baku: Azerbaijan Medical University; 2023. Available from: http://bck.az/images/books/k-40-kardiovaskulyar-cerrahi.pdf

== Family ==
He is married and lives with his wife and three children in Baku.
