= Nardoqan =

Winter solstice in Central Asia

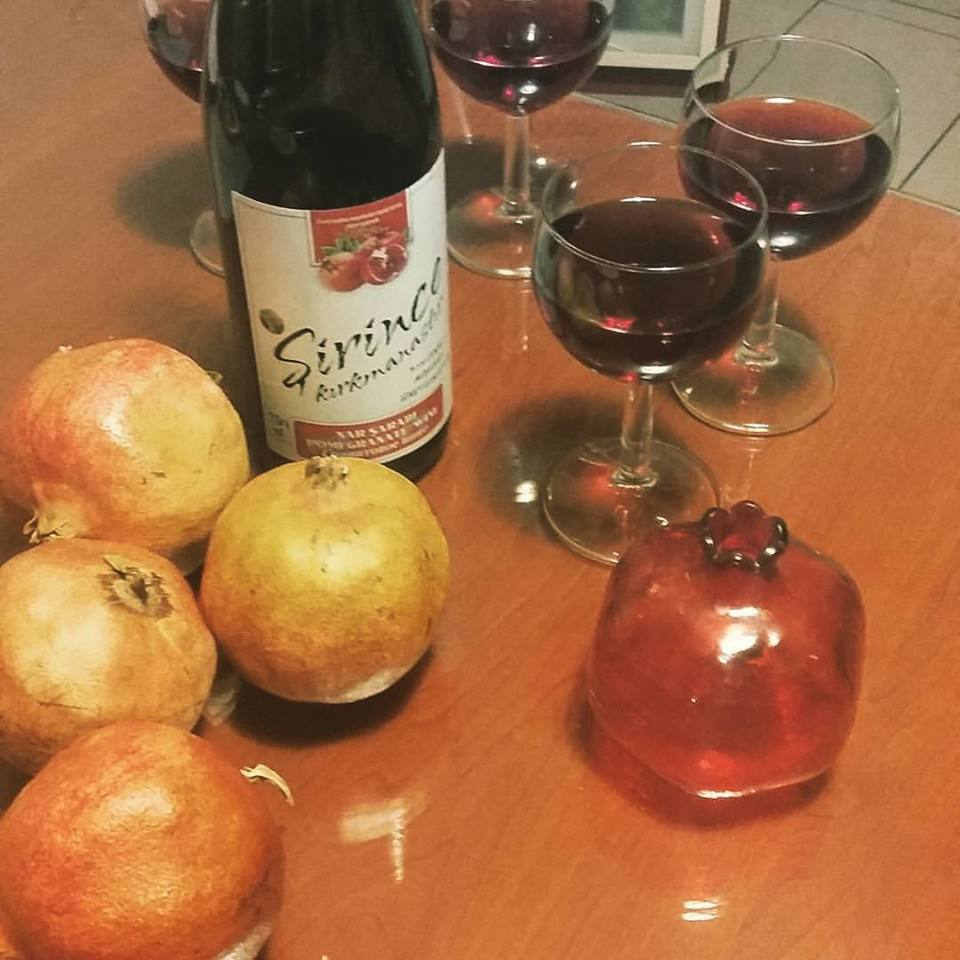
Pomegranate (in Turkish: Nar) thematic table in Nardugan

Nardoqan or Nardugan (Kazakh: Нартуған, [nɑrto̙wˈɣɑn], Turkish: Nardoğan, Azerbaijani: Narduqan, Bashkir: Нардуған) was a Turkic holiday concept in Tengriism. Nowadays, it is most commonly used to refer to the winter solstice in many Central Asian and Siberian languages. The holiday is akin, both in terms of timing and also the concept (the birth of the sun), to Yalda Night. Given the historicity of Turko-Persian (religious, literary, and cultural) ties, and the symbolism of pomegranate fruit among Iranians during Yalda, the two festivities manifestly share origins. It is also used as an equivalent name for the Christian holiday Christmas.

== Etymology ==
The root of the word is not clear. But associated with following words:

- Old Turkic : Nar – The Sun
- Mongolian: Нар (Nar) – The Sun
- Oirat: Нарн (Narn) – The Sun

And Turkic verb Doğmak (that means to born or to rise) merged and combined with this root. Also it means the "Newborn Sun".

The term 'Nar' (Turkish: Nar. Armenian: նուռ. Persian: انار) bears a symbolic reference to the sun, especially due to the white seeds.

== See also ==
- Ayaz Ata
- Yaldā Night
- Halloween
- Kosaqan
- Paktaqan
- Paynaqan
- Saturnalia
- Sayaqan

== Sources ==
- Kadim Diller ve Yazılar, Haluk Berkmen – Noel ve Nardugan
