= Taikhar Rock =

Rock formation in Arkhangai, Mongolia

Taikhar Rock: Тайхар чулуу (Mongolian); ᠲᠠᠶᠢᠬᠠᠷ ᠴᠢᠯᠠᠭᠤ (Mongolian)
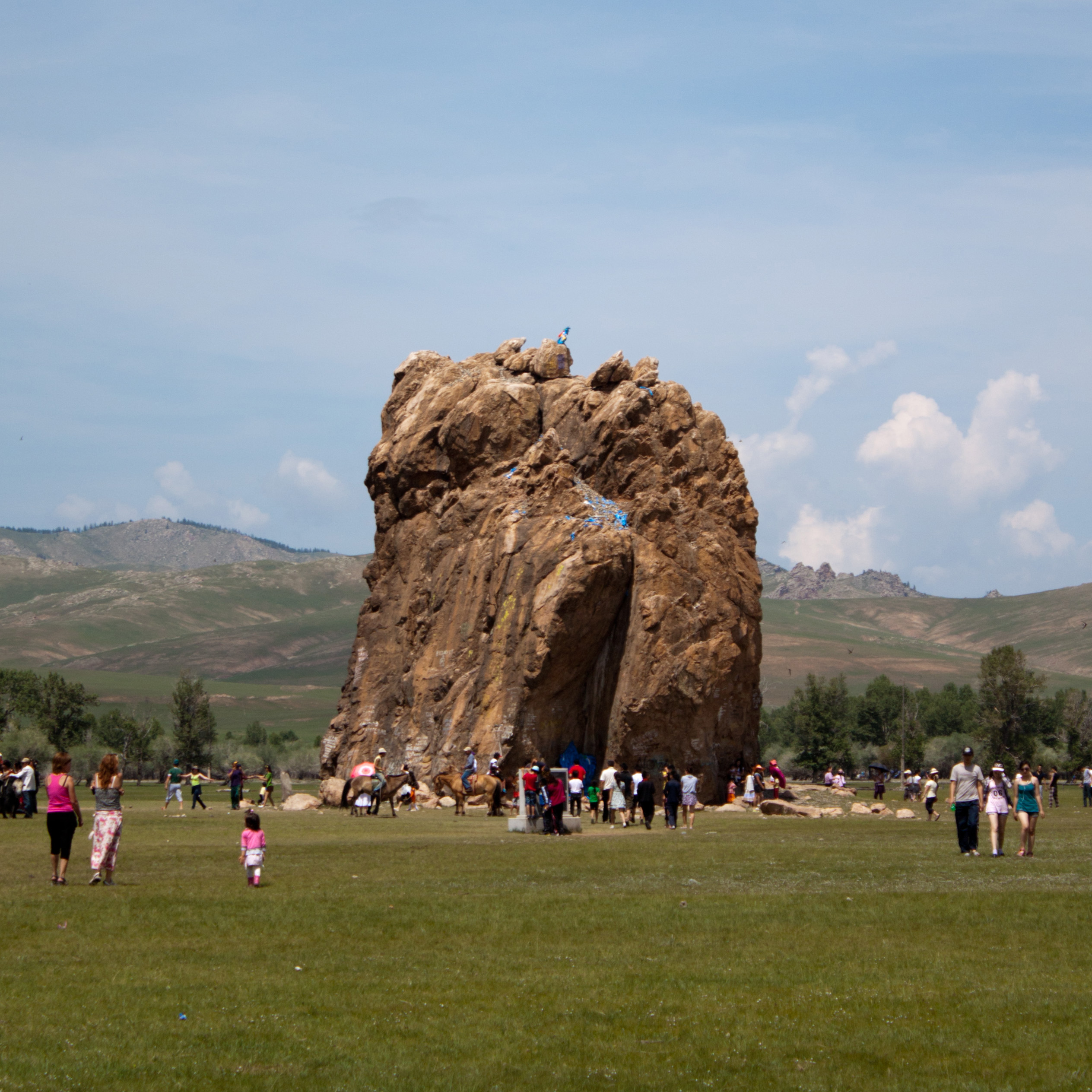
- Taikhar Rock in 2012

- Location within Mongolia
- Coordinates: 47°36′N 101°17′E
- Location: Ikh-Tamir, Arkhangai, Mongolia

Taikhar Rock (Mongolian: Тайхар чулуу, romanized: Taikhar chuluu) is a granite rock formation located near the banks of the Khoit (north) Tamir River in Ikh-Tamir, Arkhangai in Mongolia, 22 km north of the provincial capital Tsetserleg. At 18 metres tall, it contains over 150 petroglyphs, rock art specimens, and inscriptions in Old Turkic, Sogdian, Uyghur, Mongolian, ʼPhags-pa, Tibetan, Lantsa, Manchu, Oirat, and Chinese. The majority of its inscriptions are in Mongolian script.

Its Old Turkic inscriptions, dating to the 8th century Uyghur Khaganate, are known for preserving the handwritten form of the script in red and black ink, and were initially described in the modern era by Vasily Radlov as the Choiti-Tamir inscriptions in 1895, based on copies made by archeologist and ethnographer Dmitry Alexandrovich Klementz in 1891.

The rock is a popular tourist site, and as such has been subject to numerous graffiti and vandalism, making the historical texts hard to decipher. Compounding this is the rarity of documentation concerning the original inscriptions. The rock is known for its many legends surrounding it, one of the most famous of which recounts a renowned wrestler (or powerful priest in another version) who carried a stone from a nearby mountain to defeat a giant snake.

Taikhar Rock was protected by law in 1994, and was inscribed in the Mongolian Government's Immovable Historical and Cultural Heritage list in 2020.

== See also ==
- Bugut inscription, also found in Ikh-Tamir
