= Mohamed Bayram II =

Mohamed Bayram II (28 October 1748, in Tunis – 23 October 1831) is a Tunisian scholar and cleric.

Son of Mohamed Bayram I, he belongs to the Bayram family notable for being native from Turkey. His mother was the daughter of the Hanafi Mufti Baroudi Hussein. Mohamed Bayram II learned fiqh and hadith from his father, tajwid from Sheikh Mohamed Qarbattaq and other religious sciences from Sheikh Salah Ibn Abi Kawech.

He succeeded his father as Imam of Youssef Dey Mosque and taught at the University of Ez-Zitouna. In 1778, he was appointed as a qadi in Tunis before returning to teaching in 1780.

His father was appointed as a Hanafi mufti in 1801 by the sovereign Hammuda ibn Ali and was at the head of the Sharia board until his death. He published a series of books on historical and genealogical dimension of Hanafi. He frequently used the Maliki school to take the arguments of his fatwas.

He still has a reputation as a prolific worker.

== Works ==
- History of the Tunisian literature as Muradite and Husseinite dynasties (تاريخ الأدب التونسي في العهدين المرادي والحسيني)
- Compilation of biographies of Tunisian scholars (عنوان الأريب عما نشأ بالبلاد التونسية من عالم أديب), composed entirely in verses
- The masters of poetry and literature (أشهر ملوك الشعر والنثر)

He also wrote a brief history of his family since his arrival in Tunis with the contingent of Sinan, several works on Islamic jurisprudence such as the uniqueness of God and a book on the Muslim calendar based on the calculation and observation of the moon (قلادة اللآل في نظم حكم رؤية الهلال).
