= Yuxarı Cürəli =

- Municipality
- Location within Azerbaijan
- Coordinates: 39°21′48″N 48°33′57″E
- Country: Azerbaijan
- Rayon: Bilasuvar

Population
  - Total: 1,249
- Time zone: UTC+4 (AZT)
  - Summer (DST): UTC+5 (AZT)

Yuxarı Cürəli (also, Yukhary Dzhurali and Yukhary Dzhuraly) is a village and municipality in the Bilasuvar Rayon of Azerbaijan. It has a population of 1,249.

== Notable people ==
- Alikram Bayramov
