= Saya (folklore) =

Summer feast and festival Turkic and Altai folklore

Saya or Sayaqan is a summer feast and festival in Turkic Tengriism and Altai folklore. Arranged for the god that called Saya Khan. So this is a blessing, fertility and abundance ceremony.

== Description ==
Saya (Zaya) was mythological male character associated with summertime in early Turkic mythology, particularly within Altai, Anatolia and Caucasus. He was associated with rituals conducted in rural areas during summertime. Turkic peasants celebrated the Summer Solstice on June 23 by going out to the fields.

In Anatolian folklore, a familiar spirit called "Saya Han" lived in mountains who protects sheep flocks.

== Saya Game / Play ==
Saya Play and songs have an important role in the emotional, and moral development of children in rural areas. They learn about solidarity and co-operation. Also, an old tradition is continued with this game. Children wander homes and collect food, for instance.

== Celebration ==
The Saya festival (literally it can be translated as abundance) is related to a cult of a solar deity, with a fertility cult.

Ancient Yakuts celebrated the New Year at the Yhyakh (23 June) festival. Its traditions include women and children decorating trees and tethering posts with "salama" (nine bunches of horse hair hung on horse-hair ropes). The oldest man, wearing white, opens the holiday. He is accompanied by seven virgin girls and nine virgin boys and starts the ritual by sprinkling kymys on the ground, feeding the fire. He prays to the Ai-ii spirits for the well-being of the people who depend on them and asks the spirits to bless all the people gathered.

== Sources ==
- SAYA GELENEĞİ, Hazırlayan ve Yazan: Doğan SIRIKLI / Sivas Halil Rıfat Paşa Lisesi / Tarih Öğretmeni - "SAYA GELENEĞİ" (in Turkish)

== See also ==
- Paktaqan
- Nardoqan
- Paynaqan
- Kosaqan
