= Altyn Tamgan Tarhan inscription =

Turkic inscription found in Bulgan, Mongolia

Altyn Tamgan Tarhan inscription or Ihe Ashete inscription is an inscription on a stele erected by Bilge Ishbara Tamgan Tarkhan, the son of Ashina Duoxifu. It was discovered 53 km north-west to the Orkhon inscriptions. According to András Róna-Tas it was erected in 724.

== Discovery and translation ==
It was discovered by Russian scientist N. P. Levin in 1891.

=== Region ===
The inscription was found in northeast of Tulee mountain, Bulgan Province, Mongolia.

=== Complete text ===
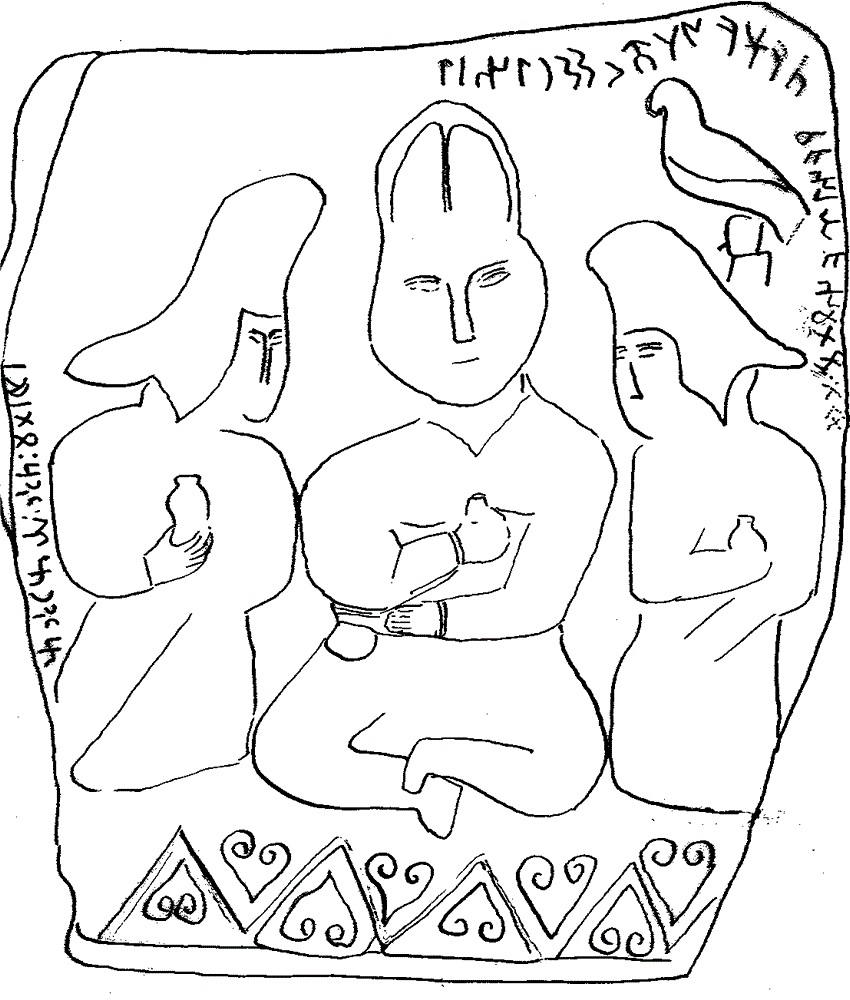
Altyn Tamgan Tarhan inscription, front side.

Old Turkic original:

Tekeš Kül Tudun inisi
jükünür kün bedizdim
Azγanaz er aγïr bedismis

Kül Tudun inisi Altun Tamγan Tarqan yoγï umadï(-q?)
üčün adïrïltïmïz alqalïlma ülüg uyarlïγ
ermis qalïma eki
bardïŋïz esiz
oγullarï Turïγul Yelgek laγzïn jïl
adïrïlïmïsča saqunur ertimiz adïrïlïn

öze Teŋiri eriklig mis аqanmïs
... adïrïlïmïs ülügime ... bertim
...er...

English translation:

(I am) younger brother of Tekes Kul Tudun.
I made (this funeral plate) on the worshiping day.
Azγanaz prepared it with honor.

We were waiting for funeral ceremony of Altyn Tamgan Tarhan, the younger brother of Kul Tudun,
whom we had lost. On behalf of his relatives, we built
...
you went away. (Your) left ownerless
sons Turïγul Yelgek in the year of Boar
parted from you and missed (for you). You left (us).

Tengri on the sky ...
... lost. (For my) funeral ... I gave away…
... man ...
