= Indira Bajramović =

Roma activist and economist

- Citizenship: Bosnia and Herzegovina
- Occupations: Activist and economist
- Organization: Association of Roma Women 'Better Future'

Indira Bajramović is a Roma activist and economist who has been working to improve the condition of Roma women in Bosnia and Herzegovina for over 20 years. She is the director of the Association of Roma Women 'Better Future' (local name 'Bolja budućnost') from Tuzla.

Bajramović has worked to provide aid and relief to rural Roma villages, and also advocated for Roma people to have equal opportunity in Bosnia and Herzegovina. Specifically, Bajramović has focused on raising awareness about the difficulties faced by unemployed Roma women and victims of domestic violence and abuse.

== Activism ==
Bajramović's association focuses on providing food and hygiene products as well as school supplies for young children in Roma communities. Additionally, the association works to provide private medical examinations for impoverished women, specifically to screen for breast cancer.

=== COVID-19 Pandemic ===
During the summer of 2020, amid the COVID-19 pandemic, Bajramović and her foundation partnered with the Bosnia and Herzegovina Women's Roma Network, the Tuzla Community Foundation, and the International Solidarity Forum Emmaus to provide 700 aid packages to local Roma communities around Kiseljak. Bajramović helped to coordinate the distribution of 400 meals a day once every 3 days with volunteers. She was also engaged in several construction projects including that of a football pitch and a playroom for children. Additionally, she was involved in the reconstruction of a damaged canal, which had previously led to the flooding of many local houses.

In addition to providing assistance to Roma communities during the pandemic, Bajramović also documented deficiencies in rural areas that were further exacerbated by the pandemic. She pointed out the smaller share of students from Roma communities participate in online classes, the increasing rate of domestic violence and discrimination in health care. She particularly highlighted the lack of availability of COVID-19 testing in these rural communities.

== Politics ==
Bajramović ran for a position on the Tuzla city council as number 9 on the Union for a Better Future of BiH (Bosnian: Savez za bolju budućnost Bosne i Hercegovine) ticket. She was not elected. A total of 20 Roman women ran, but none were elected as councillors. During the election, 47 Roma men ran as well, of whom 6 became councilors. Bajramović ascribed the women's lack of success to their focus on community work instead of visible campaigning. She also brought attention to the splitting of the vote among many new parties, and urged Roma to consolidate behind one candidate, though she was heartened by the greater number of Roma running for office than in previous years.
