= Bayram, Baghlan =

Bayram
- Location in Afghanistan
- Coordinates: 36°15′N 69°00′E
- Country: Afghanistan
- Province: Baghlan Province
- Time zone: + 4.30

Bayram is a village in Baghlan Province in north eastern Afghanistan.

== See also ==
- Baghlan Province
