= İyd-i Millî =

Ottoman national holiday

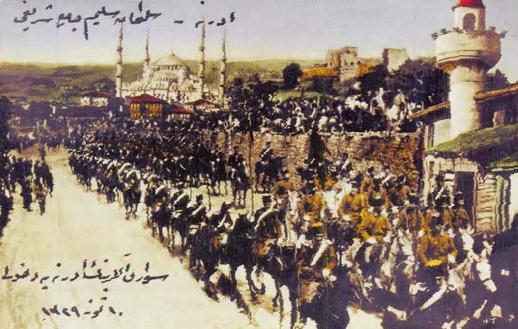
A view from the entrance of the cavalry regiment to Edirne during the Iyd-i Milli celebrations in 1911.

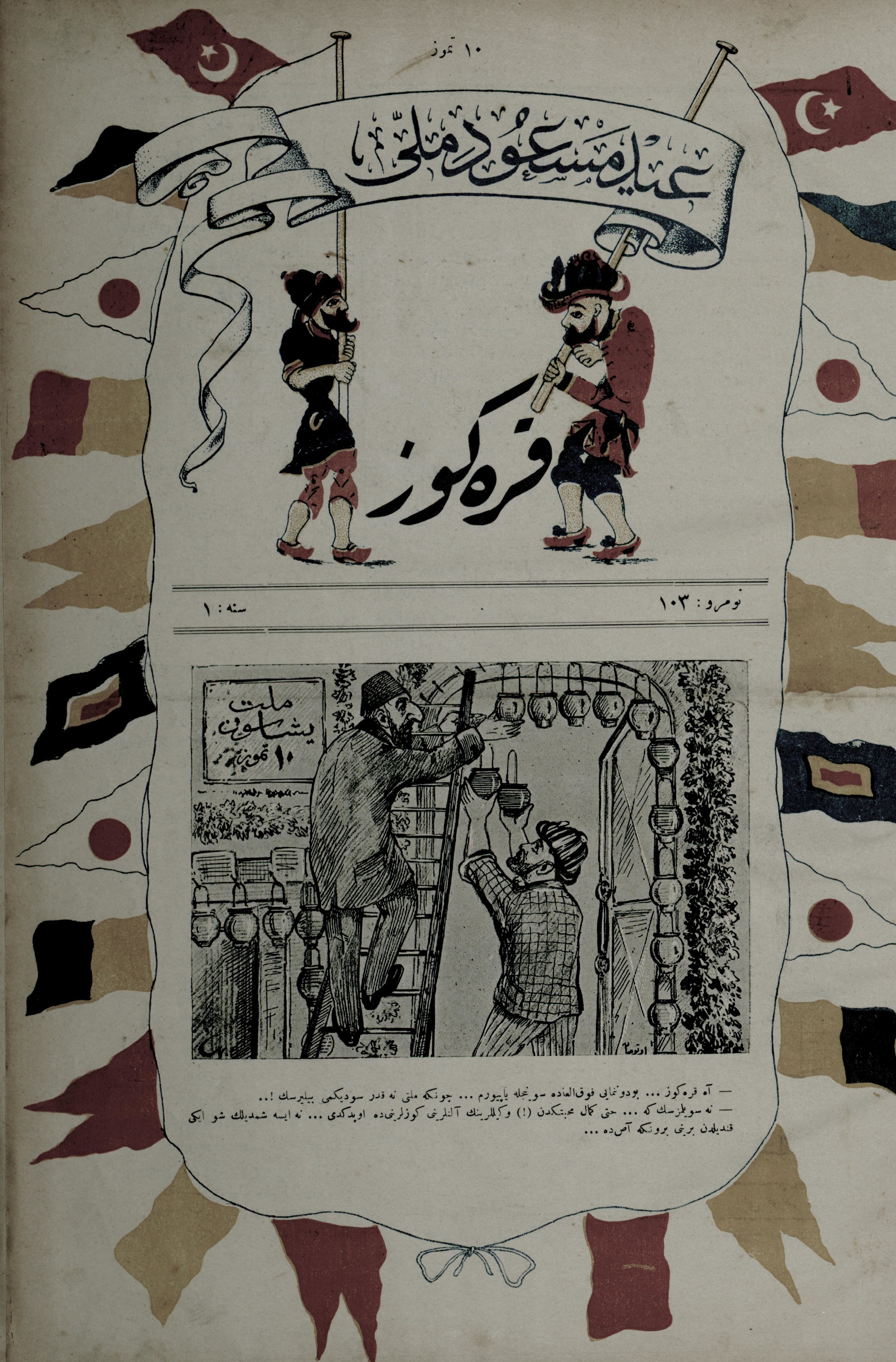
The first page of the newspaper Karagöz for İyd-i Milli, 23 July 1909.

İyd-i Milli was a national holiday that commemorated the Young Turk Revolution. It was celebrated in the Ottoman Empire every 23 July, the date of the declaration of the Second Constitutional Era, since 1909. The celebration of İyd-i Milli, the only national holiday in the Ottoman Empire, continued after the establishment of the Republic of Turkey in 1923, until it was abolished in 1935.

== History ==
The issue of establishing a national holiday in the country first came to the fore upon the application of Mehmed Ziya Bey, an officer of the Ministry of Education, when the relevant motion was read by İzmir MP Ahmed Müfid Bey at the session of the Chamber of Deputies on January 21, 1909. While this proposal was being discussed at the parliamentary session on January 26, 1909, Istanbul deputy Hüseyin Cahit Bey suggested that the 23rd of July, when the Second Constitutional Monarchy was declared, be a national holiday instead of the establishment of the state. After being accepted in the assembly it was sent to the Layiha Committee. It was then presented to the Grand Vizier Hüseyin Hilmi Pasha, and with the decision of the Council of Ministers dated 30 June 1909, the bill was sent to the Presidency of the Parliament. The bill was read in the first session of Parliament held on July 5, 1909, was accepted and enacted.

The decree in this direction was published in the newspaper Takvim-i Vekayi dated 6 July 1909.
