= Kırıkkale University =

University in Kırıkkale, Turkey

Coordinates: 39.8740°N 33.4461°E

- Established: 1992
- Location: Kırıkkale, Turkey
- Website: Official website

Kırıkkale University is a university located in Kırıkkale, Turkey. It was established in 1992.
