= Kosa (folklore) =

Spring feast and festival in Turkic and Altai folklore

Kosa (Turkish: Kosa or "Koça", Azerbaijani Turkish: Qoça) or Qochaqan (Turkish: Koçagan) is a spring feast and festival Turkic Tengrism and Altai folklore. Arranged for the god that called Kocha Khan (Turkish: Koça Han). So this is a blessing, fertility and abundance ceremony.

== Description ==
Kocha (Qoça) was mythological male character associated with youth and springtime in early Turkic mythology, particularly within Altai, Anatolia and Azerbaijan. He was associated with rituals conducted in rural areas during springtime. Turkic peasants celebrated the return of spring on March 23 by going out to the fields, carrying a clay figure of a lark which had been decorated with flowers. They sang songs naming a spring month Koça. "Koç" is still the word for "ram" in the Turkic languages, as well as Turkish and Azerbaijani. Also, Koçan or Koç Ayı is a Turkic word for a month in folk calendar. The month Mai (or sometimes June) is sometimes named Kosak in Turkish language.

In Anatolian folklore, a familiar spirit called "Koça Han" lived in mountains who protects sheep flocks.

== Köse game/play ==
Köse play and songs have an important role in the emotional, and moral development of children in rural areas. They learn about solidarity and co-operation. Also old tradition is continued with this game. The word Köse means beardless, but associated with Kosa ceremony.

== See also ==
- Paktaqan
- Nardoqan
- Paynaqan
- Sayaqan
