= Choiti-Tamir inscriptions =

Turkic inscription

The Choito-Tamir inscriptions (also called Hoyt Tamir texts or Taihar Rock writings) are inscriptions erected during Uyghur Khaganate period. According Louis Bazin, the inscriptions were erected between 753 and 756. There are over 200 inscriptions in the region, written in Old Uyghur and Chinese alphabets. The texts were found on Taikhar rock. The rock is 39 meters high and located southeast from Hoyt Tamir river in Arkhangai Province of Mongolia. The inscriptions were first translated by Vasily Radlov.

== Complete text ==
erimen qut berti
at yïl... : t.ay : eki : ...a : ay :
Teŋirde : qut bolm... : qan : elinde :
....... : qan : atïγ : .... öntürti : öŋre :
.....m : atïγ..üz : ......
Teŋirken : alïp qutluγ : bilge qan
ögürig : begler bilig ün...iz
Alïpïtïm : .........qan beg q...bir
bir yeg...bir ay er...qaγan
ot...ay erim
teg...kü.....
Yünlüg qunčuy
...duš qunčuy
....
....
.... čur
... qa barïr
... qutluγ
bolzun
bičin yïl : yiti...nč : bir yegirmi
iki : gičig bačïγqa : baytaγ :
beš uy qara bašïγ : yaylatïm :
küzti : taňïn taš : sisyetim :
mun erimiŋ eli barïrmin
küŋlik bu yorïq
