= Bai Baianai =

Spirit in Siberian folklore

Bai Baianai (Old Turkic: 𐰉𐰖:𐰉𐰖𐰣𐰖) is the Yakut spirit of forests, animals and patron of hunters. Hunters light fires and pray that their work will pass fertile and without accidents. In some cultures, she protects children. She is considered a protector of the lineage.

== Description ==
Baianai in ancient times was the Turkic goddess of wildlife, wealth and fertility. She was worshipped throughout what is now called as Altai and Sakha. Her name means "rich, fertile, wealthy". She was the daughter of Kayra.

Baianai is sometimes a woodland fairy or protector spirit found in Turkic-Altaic folklore and mythology. In Central Asia she is known as Payna. There are three Baianais:

1. Bai Baianai: Goddess of hunting.
2. Tagh Baianai: Goddess of forests.
3. Ughu Baianai: Goddess of fishery.

== Etymology ==
The word Baianai has Altaic-Turkic roots with a meaning of "wealth", "richness", "grandness", "greatness" and "divinity".

== Appearance ==
Baianai is commonly depicted as ethereal maidens with long loose hair, sometimes also with wings. They are usually dressed in free-flowing gowns, their garments decorated with feathers by means of which they can fly like birds. Baianai is most often described as being a blonde, tall and slender woman with pale, glowing skin and fiery eyes. Baianais are believed to be the very beautiful women, with an affinity to fire. They have the powers to bring about drought, burn a farmer's crops or make cattle die of high fever. It is said that when a Baianai is angered she would change her appearance and turn into a monstrous bird, capable of flinging fire at her enemies.

== Habitat ==
According to folk beliefs, Baianai lives inside huge old trees, in abandoned shacks or dark caves, near rivers, ponds or wells. Baianai come to the human world during only the spring and stay until autumn.

== Bibliography ==
- Мифы народов мира — М: Советская энциклопедия, 1991 (in Russian)
- Türk Mitolojisi Ansiklopedik Sözlük, Celal Beydili, Yurt Yayınevi (Page - 95)
