= AzzyLand =

Canadian YouTuber (born 1991)

- Born: Azra Bajrami; February 23, 1991 (age 35)

YouTube information
- Channel: AzzyLand
- Years active: 2015–2023
- Genres: Gaming, Vlog, Cosplay
- Subscribers: 12.9 million
- Views: 6.6 billion
- Last updated: February 28, 2026

Azra "Azzy" Bajrami (born February 23, 1991), also known as her pseudonym AzzyLand, is a Canadian YouTuber. She was the most viewed female YouTuber in 2019, with 1.9 billion views.

== Career ==
Early in to her career, she initially focused on gaming-related and cosplay content before eventually branching out to vlogging and reaction videos.

In 2020, she participated in a charity livestream with other YouTubers to raise money for the SickKids foundation.

In 2022, she had a partnership with Gamelancer Media, which published her video content.

In 2023, AzzyLand accused fellow YouTuber SSSniperWolf of copying thumbnails and titles, as well as imitating her mannerisms. SSSniperWolf denied the claims, accusing AzzyLand of copying her instead.
