= Bairampur, Raebareli =

Bairampur
- Village
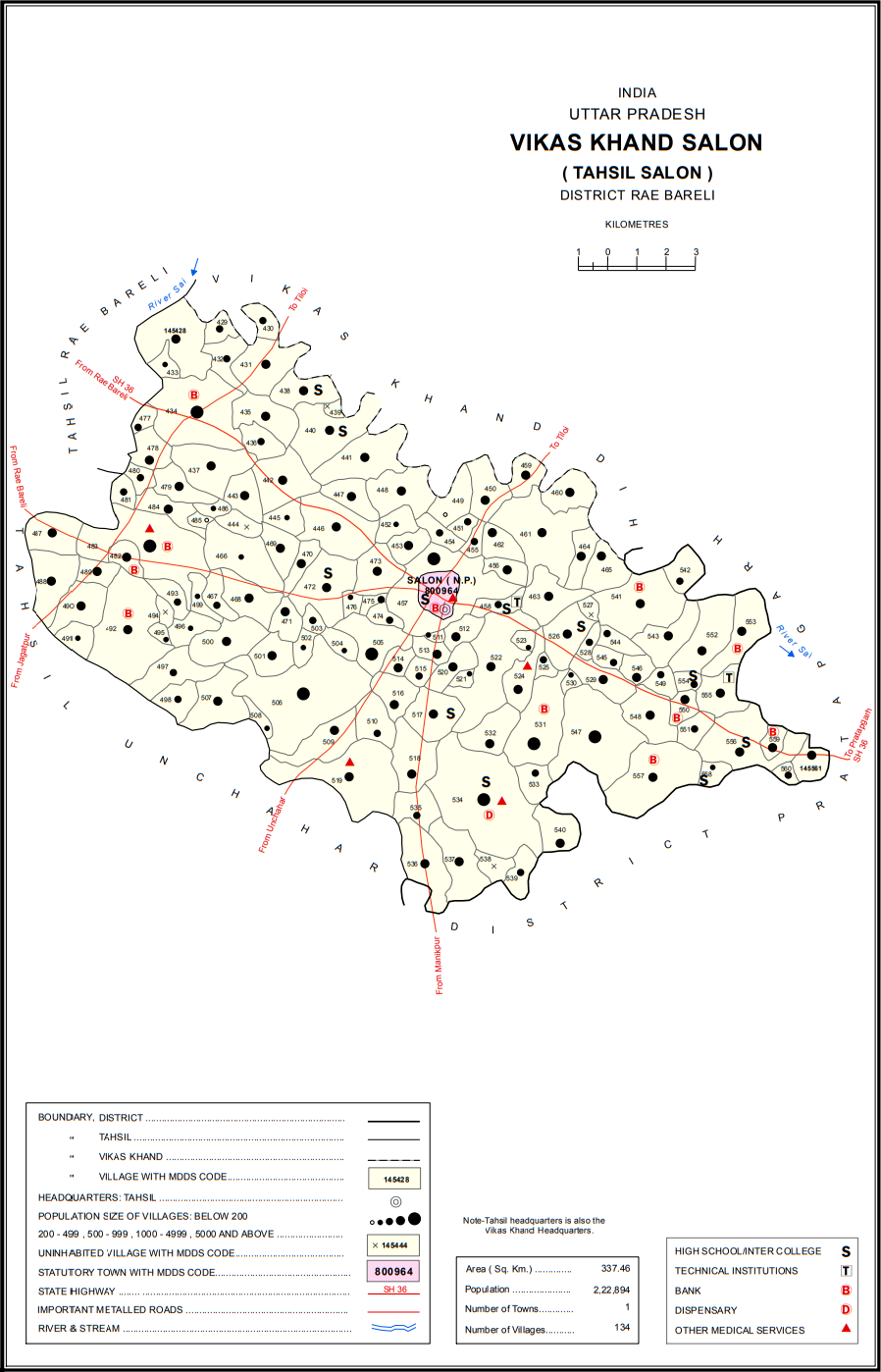
- Map showing Bairampur (#552) in Salon CD block

- Location in Uttar Pradesh, India
- Coordinates: 26.013883°N 81.550901°E
- Country: India
- State: Uttar Pradesh
- District: Raebareli

Area
  - Total: 3.02 km^{2} (1.17 sq mi)

Population (2011)
  - Total: 2,597
  - Density: 860/km^{2} (2,230/sq mi)

Languages
  - Official: Hindi
- Time zone: UTC+5:30 (IST)
- Vehicle registration: UP-35

Bairampur is a village in Salon block of Rae Bareli district, Uttar Pradesh, India. It is located 40 km from Raebareli, the district headquarters. As of 2011, Bairampur has a population of 2,597 people, in 474 households. It has one primary school and no healthcare facilities, and it does not host a permanent market or a periodic haat.

The 1961 census recorded Bairampur as comprising 6 hamlets, with a total population of 1,074 people (530 male and 541 female), in 218 households and 216 physical houses. The area of the village was given as 773 acres.

The 1981 census recorded Bairampur (as "Barampur") as having a population of 1,604 people, in 387 households, and having an area of 305.54 hectares. The main staple foods were given as wheat and rice.
