= Alikram Bayramov =

- Born: December 22, 1968 (age 56); Yukhary Dzhuraly, Bilasuvar, Azerbaijan SSR, USSR
- Occupation(s): Singer, song-writer
- Years active: 1989–present
- Website: alikram.az

Alikram Bayramov (Azerbaijani: Əlikram Bayramov; 22 December 1968, Yukhary Dzhuraly, Bilasuvar, Azerbaijan SSR, USSR), is an Azerbaijani singer.

== Biography ==
Alikram Bayramov was born December 22, 1968 in Yukhary Dzhuraly in Bilasuvar District. When Bayramov was a child, his father died. Because of his ambitions for music since childhood, he always crooned and it was consolation for him. He also made people happy by crooning.

When he grew up, Alikram did not waste his life and, he started being familiar with music. By creating his own group, he composed music to acquit the sympathy of people.

Finally, with the composition of Asrin gozali (transl. the beauty of the century) he gained the sympathy of people and became their favorite.

He handles his job at the moment.

== Family ==
Bayramov is married. He has one children, and three grandchild.

== Career ==
Since his adolescent age, he created his musical group and worked as chief of The Culture Group of Bilasuvar town. In 1989, he started being invited to sing at weddings.

In 1997, during the concert, in Gachgin town of Bilasuvar, he was caught by the great leader H.Aliyev, went to the capital, and he started collaborating with a few poets and composers.

In 1997, he professionally started appearing on TV. Before the public, he participated in the creative concert of Zemfira Alishqizi for the first time.

He sang the compositions of a few favorite composers, and his compositions turned into people's favorite songs and he went on composing.

He is the author of Asrin Gozali, Gozlayacayam, Yaz chichayi, Yashayiram sanin uchun, Daniz arzularim, Ugur meleyim among other songs.

== Repertoire ==
- Darıxmışam
- Nəfəsim
- Nə yaxşı varsan
- Sevgi cinayətdirmi ?
- Sənə nə deyim
- Həsrətim
- Ay ömrüm
- Bu dünyanı sevək
- Həyatıma xoş gəldin
- Fərəh qızım
- Son sevgi
- Yaraşıqlım
- Sevənlərə nəğmə deyək
- Uğur mələyim
- Küsmüşəm
- Mən sənin yanına qışda gəlirdim
- Neyləyim 2
- Sevgi mahnisi (Baladadaşın ilk məhəbbəti filmindən)
- Yalan deyil
- Zalım dostlar
- Biləsuvar
- Neyləmişəm
- Unudub getmə
- Alagöz yarım
- Azərbaycan
- Bu gözəl öldürdü məni
- Çıx get
- Evlən mənimlə
- Gəl apar məni
- Gözlə məni gələcəyəm
- Günahkarsan
- Kiçik qız
- Qərib oğlanlar
- Mübarəkdir
- Niyə gəlmir
- Şad olmuşam
- Yanan mən olum
- Son vida
- Bilmirəm
- Neyləyim
- Sultan yarım
- Alça
- Azərbaycan qızları
- Bu gül
- Dalğalar
- Evlən mənimlə
- Gəl bəri
- Gözlər danışır
- Xallıda olar (Aşıq mahnısı)
- Kimim var ki
- Qış günəşi (2017)
- Nazın öldürəcək
- Öldü var, döndü yox
- Təki, sən səslə məni
- Yaşamam sənsiz
- Çadralı qız
- Sarı qız
- Ay Ana o qızı al mənim üçün
- Bəxt ulduzum
- Bu sevgi
- Dünyanın gözəli
- Evlənmirəm
- Gəl, sənə sevmək öyrədim
- Gözləyəcəm
- Xəzəllərin rəqsi
- Küsmüşəm
- Mən sənin yanına qışda gəlirdim
- Neyləyim 2
- Sevgi mahnisi (Baladadaşın ilk məhəbbəti filmindən)
- Toy olsun
- Yaşayıram sənin üçün
- Ölərəm elə
- Əminə
- Sən də səndə
- Ay işığında
- Bəylə gəlin toyunda
- Canan
- Durna Qatar
- Əlvida
- Görüşə gəl
- Gözləyir
- İcazə ver
- Qapımı bağlı saxlama
- Mən tənha qaldım
- Nə boran, nə tufan (xalq mahnısı)
- Soruşuram Necəsən
- Vurulmuşam
- Yaz çiçəyim
- Ağlayaq bir yerdə ölək bir yerdə
- Qayıt
- Sübhədək
- Ölmərəm daha
