= Ismayil Bayramov =

Azerbaijani Red Army rifleman, Hero of the Soviet Union (1900–1945)

Ismayil Khalil oglu Bayramov
- İsmayıl Xəlil oğlu Bayramov
- Born: 1900; Dodinovka, Stavropol Governorate, Russian Empire
- Died: 10 February 1945 (aged 44–45); Neumarkt, Germany
- Military career
- Allegiance: Soviet Union
- Branch: Red Army
- Service years: 1944–1945
- Rank: Starshina
- Unit: 181st Rifle Division
- Conflicts: World War II; East Prussian Offensive
- Awards: Hero of the Soviet Union; Order of Lenin; Medal for Battle Merit

Ismayil Khalil oglu Bayramov (Azerbaijani: İsmayıl Xəlil oğlu Bayramov; 1900 – 10 February 1945) was an Azerbaijani Red Army Starshina and a Hero of the Soviet Union. He was a party organizer in a company of the 243rd Rifle Regiment in the 181st Rifle Division, part of the 6th Army. During the battle for Neumarkt railway station, Bayramov was reported to have killed several dozen German soldiers and repulsed five counterattacks. After reportedly being twice wounded, he blew himself up with a grenade. Bayramov was posthumously awarded the title Hero of Soviet Union on 10 April 1945.

== Early life ==
Bayramov was born in 1900 in the village of Dodinovka to a peasant family. He graduated from lower secondary school and worked on the kolkhoz as a shepherd and then a foreman. In 1939 he became the chairman of the kolkhoz.

== World War II ==
In 1944, Bayramov was drafted into the Red Army. He fought in combat from that year and became a Communist Party of the Soviet Union member. On 17 May 1944 he was awarded the Medal for Battle Merit. He became a Starshina party organizer in a company of the 243rd Rifle Regiment of the 181st Rifle Division.

In February 1945, Bayramov fought in the East Prussian Offensive. On 10 February, during the battle for Neumarkt train station, he reportedly killed more than 12 German soldiers with a machine gun and his bayonet. With two others he reportedly destroyed a machine gun that was blocking the advance. During the fighting, he reportedly killed several dozen German soldiers and the soldiers under his leadership repulsed five counterattacks. After being wounded twice, Bayramov was surrounded and reportedly blew himself up to avoid capture. He was buried near Neumarket. On 10 April, Bayramov was posthumously awarded the title Hero of the Soviet Union and the Order of Lenin.

== Legacy ==
A bust of Bayramov was constructed in Dodinovka. A street there was also named for him.
