= Kamil Bayramov =

Russian football manager and former player

Personal information
- Full name: Kamil Kamal oglu Bayramov
- Date of birth: 19 January 1972 (age 54)
- Place of birth: Azerbaijan SSR, Soviet Union
- Positions: Midfielder; forward

Senior career*
Years	Team	Apps	(Gls)
1990–1991	Araz Baku	44	(19)
1992	Taraggi Baku	15	(7)
1993–1996	Neftçi	56	(6)
1998	FC SKA Rostov-on-Don	2	(0)
2009–2010	FC Midel Aksay		
2010	FC Midel Aksay (beach soccer)		
Total		117+	(32+)

International career
1992	Azerbaijan	1	(0)

Managerial career
- 2016–2017: FC SKA-2 Rostov-on-Don
- 2018: FC SKA Rostov-on-Don
- 2018: FC SKA Rostov-on-Don (assistant)
- 2018–: FC SKA Rostov-on-Don (youth)
- * Club domestic league appearances and goals

Kamil Kamal oglu Bayramov (Azerbaijani: Kamil Kamal oğlu Bayramov, Russian: Камил Камал Оглы Байрамов; born 19 January 1972), also known in Russia as Kamil Kamalovich Bayramov (Russian: Камил Камалович Байрамов), is an Azerbaijani former footballer and current manager. He earned one cap for Azerbaijan, in the team's inaugural match in 1992.
