= Bairampur, Uttar Pradesh =

Bairampur Shaurya Shashwat ka gaw
- Village
- Country: India
- State: Uttar Pradesh
- District: Mirzapur

Government
  - Type: Panchayati raj
  - Body: Gram panchayat

Languages
  - Official: Hindi
- Time zone: UTC+5:30 (IST)
- Vehicle registration: UP-

Bairampur is a village in Mirzapur district, Uttar Pradesh, India. It is near Aharaura, in the vicinity of the ancient fort of Chunar
