= Pakta =

Autumn feast and festival

Pakta or Paqtaqan is an autumn feast and festival in Turkic Tengrism and Altai folklore. Arranged for the god that called Pakta. So this is a blessing, fertility and abundance ceremony.

== Description ==
Pakta was a mythological male character associated with youth and autumnal time in early Turkic mythology, particularly within Altai, Siberia and Central Asia. He is also a proctor spirit of harvest. Along with her male companion Payna (pine goddess) he was associated with rituals conducted in rural areas during fall at harvest time. In the nineteenth century, Altai peasants celebrated the arrival of autumn on September 21 by going out to the fields. They sang songs naming the autumn season Pakta. The word "Pakta" is still the mythological word for "abundance" in the Altai language, as well as Old Turkic. Hence he is an abundance god. Also, Pakta is a word related with name of the god Bakhty, the son of Ülgen.

== See also ==
- Paynaqan
- Nardoqan
- Kosaqan
- Sayaqan
