= Salih Bajrami =

Singer

Salih Bajrami Krasniqi (1919, Vlaški Drenovac, Mališevo, Prekoruplje, – 1987) was a singer from Kosovo.

== Biography ==
As early as the age of 6–7, he was brought by his father to sing at weddings and other gatherings. Along with his father Bajram, among the first to bring the šargija to the Drenica area, young Salih performed with Amrush Ymeri, Riza Bllaca (who also sang with Bajram), and Feriz Krasniqi. Over the course of a half-century, he sang and often recorded many works, including epics, historical ballads known as kang të oxhakut ("hearth songs"), love songs, and his specialty of standbys from the Turkic bard or ashik tradition. He memorized around 500 songs.

Bajrami and his cousin Krasniqi performed for over forty years at weddings in Drenica, Llap, and elsewhere in the country. He also appeared at many concerts and civic events at the provincial, republican, federal, and international level during the time of the Socialist Federal Republic of Yugoslavia. In 1966, he won first prize at the Llangollen International Musical Eisteddfod. Shortly before his death, he was awarded a diploma and pocket watch by the Kosovar Folklorist Journal (Albanian: Revisten e Folklorit Burimor Kosovar) of Glogovac for his work preserving the folk music of Kosovo Albanians on the journal's 25th anniversary. The two cousins often performed as an ensemble with the šargija and çifteli.

== Music ==
He performed instrumentally, but also sang tales of the hajduk (popular bandit) Hrnjica Brothers and the Albanian National Awakening, among other historical subjects. Specific things and people fêted include the League of Prizren, Haxhi Zeka, Ymer Prizreni, Bajram Curri, Hasan Prishtina, and Isa Boletini. He and Feriz often sang and played in unison and preserved the original tuning differing from standard Western equal temperament. Much of the traditional material would have been performed on special occasions accompanied by the gusle as well as the aforementioned instruments. The Bajrami-Krasniqi duo was particularly well-known for their call-and-response approach to the ashik songs, with Bajrami as leader and Krasniqi as responding in falsetto fortissimo.

== Bibliography ==
- Bahtir, Sheholli (1998). Folklor dhe Etnologji. Pristina: Albanological Institute of Pristina. pp. 215–218.
- Biography at Rapsodet.com
