= Sead Bajramović =

Serbian footballer (born 1973)

Personal information
- Full name: Sead Bajramović
- Date of birth: 1 November 1973 (age 52)
- Place of birth: Novi Pazar, SFR Yugoslavia
- Position: Defender

Senior career*
Years	Team	Apps	(Gls)
- Novi Pazar
- Kolubara
- Hajduk Kula
1997–1998	Rad	35	(1)
1999–2000	Đerzelez	17	(0)
2001–2002	Rudar Pljevlja	16	(0)
2002–2003	Osijek	0	(0)
2003–2007	Čelik Zenica	105	(?)
2007–2008	Free State Stars		
2008–2009	Čelik Zenica	0	(0)
- * Club domestic league appearances and goals

Sead Bajramović (Serbian Cyrillic: Сеад Бајрамовић; born 1 November 1973) is a Serbian retired footballer.

== Club career ==
An ethnic Bosniak, born in Novi Pazar, he started playing in his birth town club FK Novi Pazar moving afterward progressively to Second League FK Kolubara before getting to play with First League of FR Yugoslavia clubs FK Hajduk Kula and Belgrade's, FK Rad. He will also have a spell in the still recovering Bosnian League club NK Đerzelez, from Zenica, where he played in the 1999–2000 and 2000–01 seasons of the Bosnian Premier League. Until 2002 he will play with Montenegrin club FK Rudar Pljevlja that was back then still playing in the FR Yugoslavia league system. In 2002, he moved to Croatia where he played one season with Croatian First League club NK Osijek before returning to Bosnia to sign with NK Čelik Zenica to play in the Premier League of Bosnia and Herzegovina until 2009, with the exception of the 2007-08 season that he played in South Africa with Free State Stars.
