= Samir Bayramov =

Russian footballer (born 1999)

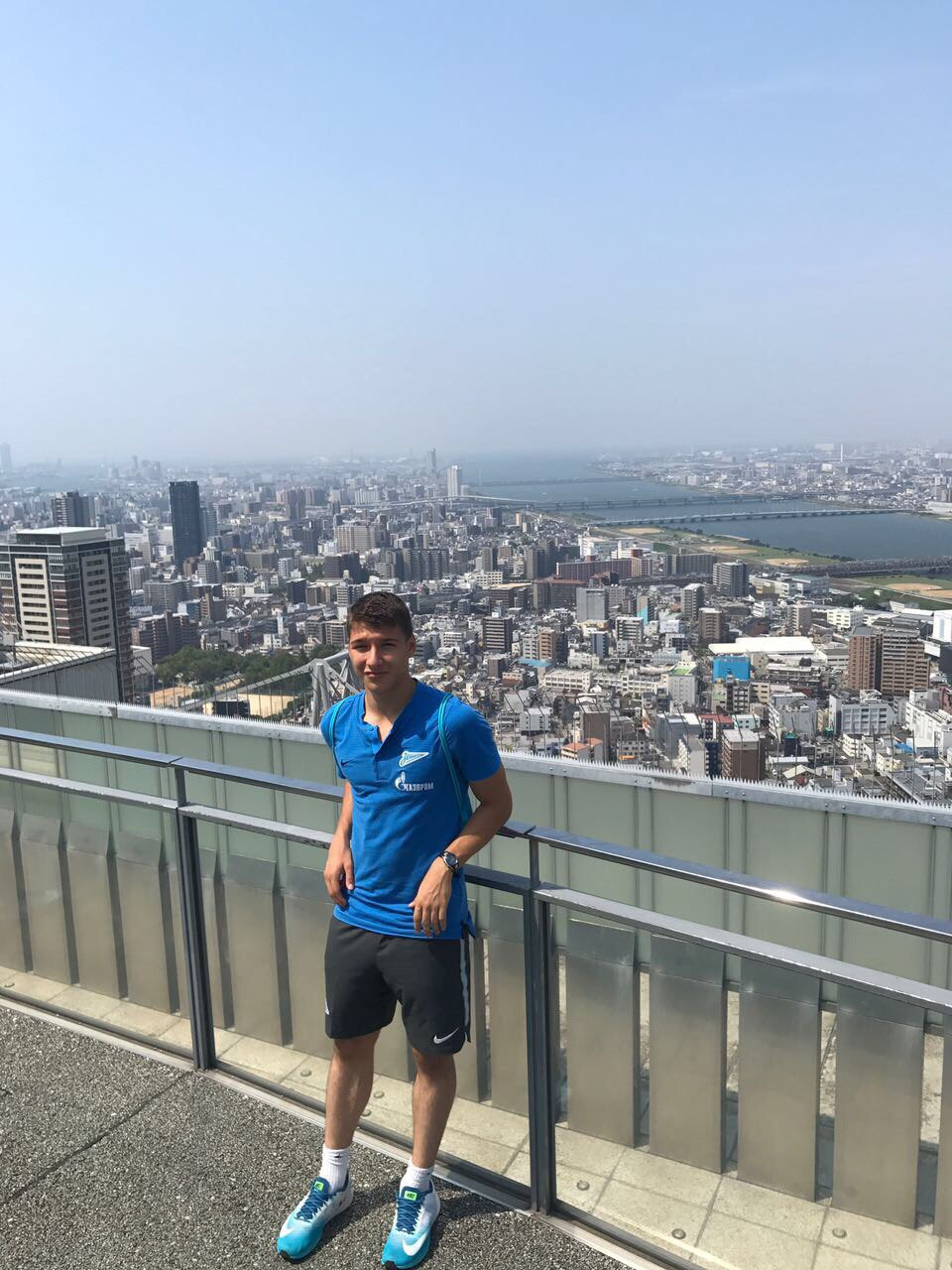

Personal information
- Full name: Samir Cafer oglu Bayramov
- Date of birth: 18 January 1999 (age 27)
- Place of birth: Saint Petersburg, Russia
- Height: 1.75 m (5 ft 9 in)
- Position: Defender

Senior career*
| Years | Team | Apps | (Gls) |
| 2016–2020 | Zenit Saint Petersburg | 0 | (0) |
| 2018–2020 | → Zenit-2 Saint Petersburg | 7 | (0) |
- * Club domestic league appearances and goals

Samir Cafer oglu Bayramov (Azerbaijani: Samir Cafər oğlu Bayramov, Russian: Самир Джафар Оглы Байрамов; born 18 January 1999) is a Russian former professional footballer.

== Club career ==
He made his professional debut in the FNL for FC Zenit-2 Saint Petersburg on 4 August 2018 in a game against Tom Tomsk.

He retired at the age of 21 due to health problems.
