= Bombogor inscription =

Turkic inscription

Bombogor inscription is a stele with a Turkic inscription erected in the 8th century in honour of a Basmyl princess (Qunčuy), who might have been married to the Karluks.

Bombogor inscription consists of five lines that feature 32 tamgas. These tamgas represent the sub-tribes and families who lived under the Khaganate. According to Kafesoglu, it might belong to the wife of Bayanchur Khan of Uyghur Khaganate.

== Discovery and translation ==
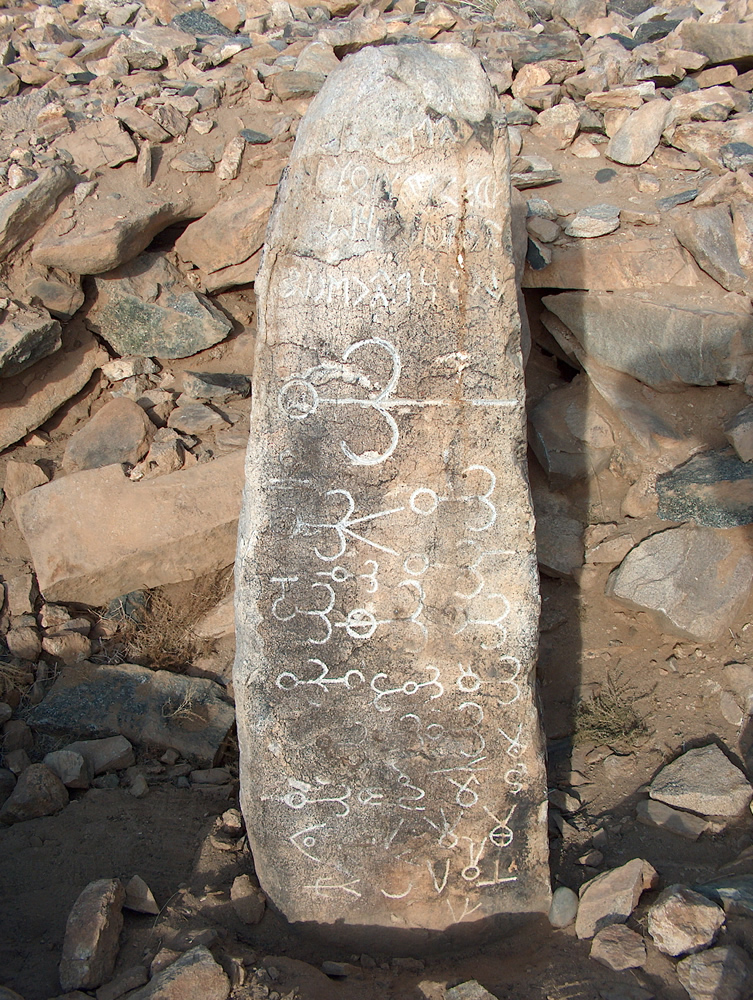
Bombogor inscription

=== Region ===
The Bombogor grave complex is situated in Shiveeny Kherem district, Bayankhongor Province, Mongolia. The monument was discovered as a result of the expedition made by the scientists from the Archeology Institute of the Academy of Sciences of Mongolia. Relevant pictures and draft copy of the text of the inscription were published immediately after its discovery.

=== Complete text ===
Old Turkic original
English translation:

...
El Beslig qunčuyiŋ
Alu Qarluq tultoni
qubarip tulton aldi
Üze /Teŋirike/ asïra jerke jükünüküm bar erti yaŋïltuqïm yoq Basmïlïγ budunïγ

...
Of princess El Beslik
... Qarluq widow's coat.
was collected and taken the widow’s coat.
I worshipped heaven (Tengri) above and earth below. I had no sin. Basmil people.

—

== Possible date and purpose ==
Researchers believe that the monument may have been erected between 718 and 742, a period, when the Gokturks might have sent a princess as a bride to Karluks to sue for peace. This is partially supported by the fact that Gokturks and Karluks fought each other in a battle in 718.
