= Aşağı Cürəli =

- Municipality
- Location within Azerbaijan
- Country: Azerbaijan
- Rayon: Bilasuvar

Population
  - Total: 2,505
- Time zone: UTC+4 (AZT)

Aşağı Cürəli is a village and municipality in the Bilasuvar Rayon of Azerbaijan. It has a population of 2,505.
