= Rafig Bayramov =

Azerbaijani politician (born 1972)

Rafig Bayramov Rafiq Bayramov

Deputy Minister of Culture of Azerbaijan
- In office 27 June 2018 – 09.05.2020

Personal details
- Born: 10 November 1972 (age 53) Baku, Azerbaijan SSR, Soviet Union (now Baku, Azerbaijan)
- Education: Baku State University
- Awards

Rafig Yasin oglu Bayramov (Azerbaijani: Rafiq Yasin oğlu Bayramov; born November 10, 1972) is an Azerbaijani politician, currently serving as Deputy Minister of Culture of Azerbaijan (2018-2020).

== Life and education ==
Rafig Bayramov was born on November 10, 1972, in Baku. He graduated from secondary school №10 in Baku with an honor medallion in 1989. He got admitted into Baku State University in 1990 and graduated from the university with honors diploma in 1995. During his education, he worked as laboratory assistant at the scientific-research laboratory of "Application of computer and mathematical methods in historical researches", participated in historical and applied researches and became the author of several scientific articles. From 1995 to 1997 he served in Azerbaijani National Guard.

== Activity ==
In 1998-1999, he worked at the Youth and Sports Department of the Executive Authority of Nizami District in Baku, and in 1999-2001 he worked in various responsible positions at the Public-Political Department of Executive Power of Baku City.

Rafig Bayramov worked as Senior instructor at the Ministry of Youth, Sport and Tourism of the Republic of Azerbaijan from 2001 to 2003.

From 2003 to 2006, he worked as Deputy Minister in the Ministry of Youth, Sport and Tourism.

Between 2006-2014, he worked as the assistant to the Minister of Culture and Tourism of the Republic of Azerbaijan.

From July 2014 to June 2018, he worked as Head of Administration of the Ministry of Culture and Tourism.

In June 2018, he was appointed Deputy Minister of Culture of Azerbaijan.

Since January 2015, he is the Chairman of the Commission of Competition at the Ministry of Culture and Tourism.

== Personal life ==
He is married and has 3 children.

== Awards ==
Between 1993-1998 he worked at non-governmental youth organizations, National Council of Youth Organizations, actively participated in local and international events, nationwide and regional projects, and was awarded several diplomas. In 2011, he was awarded the “Medal for Distinction in Public Service” under the order of the President of the Republic of Azerbaijan, and in 2018 he was awarded “Honored Worker of Culture” medal of the Ministry of Culture and Tourism.
