= Bajram =

Bajram might refer to:

== Holiday ==
- Eid
- Bayram

== People ==
- Bajram Begaj (born 1967), Albanian military officer and politician, President since 2022
- Bajram Curri (1862–1925), ethnic Albanian nationalist from Kosovo
- Bajram Fetai (born 1985), Danish-Albanian professional football forward
- Bajram Franholli (born 1968), former Albanian footballer who played as a left-wing midfielder
- Bajram Haliti (born 1955), celebrated Roma scholar and author from Kosovo, active in Romany causes
- Bajram Kelmendi (1937–1999), Kosovar lawyer and public figure
- Bajram Kosumi (born 1960), ethnic Albanian politician in Kosovo
- Bajram Nebihi (born 1988), Kosovan professional footballer of Albanian descent, who plays as a striker
- Bajram Rexhepi (born 1954), politician and the first elected post-war Prime Minister of Kosovo
- Bajram Sadrijaj (born 1986), professional footballer of Albanian descent

== Places ==
- Bajram Curri (town), town in Northern Albania on the border with Kosovo
- Bajram Curri Boulevard, major boulevard of Tirana, Albania
