= Bayramoğlu =

Bayramoğlu is a Turkish surname. Notable people with the surname include:

- Ali Bayramoğlu (born 1956), Turkish writer and political commentator
- Onur Bayramoğlu (born 1990), Turkish footballer
