= Urker =

Kazakh pop-folk group

Urker Үркер
- Origin: Almaty, Kazakhstan
- Genres: Folk rock
- Years active: 1994–present
- Members: Aydos Saghat; Rustam Musin; Nurlan Alban

Urker (Kazakh: Үркер, Úrker; Russian: Уркер) is a Kazakh pop-folk group established in 1994. They have toured internationally in Germany, France, Turkey, Turkmenistan, and the United States.

== Members ==
The band consists of:

- Aydos Saghat (Айдос Сағат): The vocalist, keyboardist, and songwriter for Urker, he studied in a conservatory in his youth, but initially dreamed of becoming a conductor rather than a songwriter.
- Rustam Musin (Рустам Мусин): The guitarist for Urker, he has no formal musical education, and originally trained as an engineer.

== History and development ==
Urker formed in 1994; lead vocalist and songwriter Aydos Saghat stated that he was inspired to form the group by the example of The Beatles. They recorded their first album in 1997; in 2001, their song "Nauryz" won the Golden Disk award, reflecting their rise to popularity. Their music combines traditional Kazakh folk melodies and modern pop rhythms. They use instruments often found in rock and pop music, like guitar and piano, alongside the dombyra and kobyz. Of their fifteen music videos produced up until 2005, fourteen were filmed in Kazakhstan; only the remaining one, "Tugan Elim", was recorded abroad, in Tashkent, Uzbekistan. Their 2007 video "Arman", shot in cooperation with Tatar musician Rezeda Galimova, was also recorded in Hong Kong. Saghat has stated that their visuals and cinematographic technique are highly influenced by British musician Peter Gabriel. In April 2007, Urker travelled to New York City for a live performance at the Lincoln Center for the Performing Arts in celebration of the holiday of Nauryz; in an interview following his return to Kazakhstan, Saghat stated that Urker would be releasing a new album later in the year.

== Discography ==
- Ansarym, 1997
- Toi Bastar, 1998
- Urker, 2001
- Made in Kazakhstan, 2002
- The best of Urker, 2004
- Tolgau, 2008
