= Kazakhs =

Turkic ethnic group

Қазақтар Qazaqtar قازاقتار
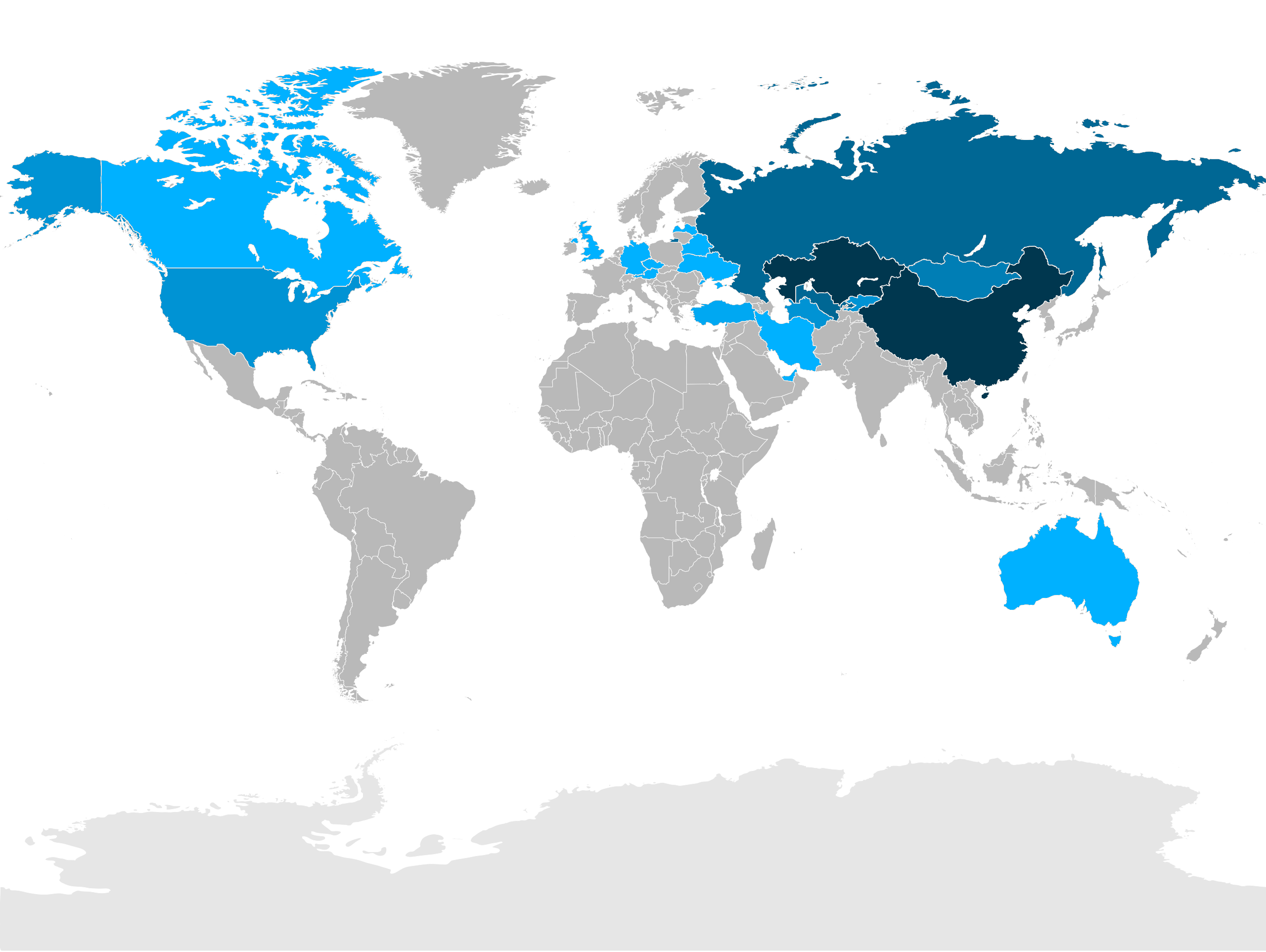
- Map of the Kazakh people around the world

Regions with significant populations
- Kazakhstan: 14,664,202 (2026)
- China: 1,562,518 (2020)
- Uzbekistan: 707,329 (2026)
- Russia: 591,970 (2021)
- Mongolia: 120,999 (2020)
- Turkey: 30,000 (2024)
- Kyrgyzstan: 28,244 (2022)
- United States: 21,913 (2022)
- Turkmenistan: 11,825 (2022)
- Iran: 10,000 (2024)
- Canada: 5,455 (2021)
- Czech Republic: 5,639 (2017)
- Ukraine: 5,526 (2001)
- United Kingdom: 5,432 (2011)
- United Arab Emirates: 5,000 (2015)
- Portugal: 3,000 (2017)
- Australia: 2,430 (2023)
- Italy: 1,924 (2022)
- Austria: 1,685
- Belarus: 1,355 (2009)
- Germany: 1,000 (2016)
- Brazil: 791 (2025)
- Pakistan: 300 (2023)
- Afghanistan: 250 (2026)
- Philippines: 215 (2026)

Languages
- Kazakh

Religion
- Predominantly Islam

Related ethnic groups
- Other Turkic peoples (particularly Karakalpaks, Nogais and Kyrgyz)

Kazakhs (Note: Kazakh: қазақтар, romanized: qazaqtar, arabized: قازاقتار, pronounced [qʰɑzɑqtʰɑ́r]) are a Turkic ethnic group native to Central Asia and Eastern Europe. They share a common culture, language and history that is closely related to those of other Turkic peoples. The majority of ethnic Kazakhs live in their nation state of Kazakhstan.

Ethnic Kazakh communities are present in Kazakhstan's border regions in Russia, Kyrgyzstan, northern Uzbekistan, northwestern China (Xinjiang), western Mongolia (Bayan-Ölgii), and northern Iran (Golestan).

The Kazakhs are the second-largest Turkic ethnic group in Central Asia and were previously the most influential of the various Central Asian ethnic groups. The Kazakhs emerged as a distinct people as a result of the fragmentation of the Mongol Empire. Distinct Kazakh ethnic identity developed throughout the 15th–16th centuries, with the final consolidation of Turko-Mongol tribes into a unified Kazakh nation within the Kazakh Khanate.

The term Kazakh is used to refer to ethnic Kazakhs, while the term Kazakhstani refers to all citizens of Kazakhstan, regardless of ethnicity.

== Ethnonym ==
There are many theories on the origin of the word "Kazakh" or "Qazaq". Some speculate that it comes from the Turkic verb qaz ('wanderer, brigand, vagabond, warrior, free, independent, freebooter, conqueror') or that it derives from the Proto-Turkic word *khasaq (a wheeled cart used by the Kazakhs to transport their yurts and belongings).

Another theory on the origin of the word "Kazakh" (or Qazaq) is that it comes from the ancient Turkic word qazğaq, first mentioned on the 8th century Turkic monument of Uyuk-Turan. According to Turkic linguist Vasily Radlov and Orientalist Veniamin Yudin, the noun qazğaq derives from the same root as the verb qazğan ('to obtain, to gain'). Therefore, qazğaq defines a type of person who wanders and seeks gain. Kazakh was a common term throughout medieval Central Asia, generally with regard to individuals or groups who had taken or achieved independence from a figure of authority. Timur described his own youth without direct authority as his Qazaqliq ("freedom", "Qazaq-ness").

=== Historical usage and qazaqliq ===
Annemarie von Gabain also notes that among the Chinggisids and Timurids rulers who underwent qazaqlïq were Janibek Khan, Kerei Khan, Timur, Babur, and Muhammad Shaybani Khan. In her view, beginning in the 15th century, the term "qazaq" referred to a member of a ruling dynasty who, pursuing political objectives, left his state and wandered through the Steppe either alone or with his family, without the support of his tribe, seeking to achieve new military conquests. The same term was also applied to princes who had failed to attain power and were therefore forced to wander without a fixed abode, as well as to entire tribes or parts of tribes that had broken away from their former political union and became qazaqs.

A more detailed definition of the term qazaqlïq is offered by Wolfgang Holzwart, based on early 16th-century Turkic sources. He characterizes qazaqlïq as a mobile way of life associated with raids and military activities, distinct from ordinary seasonal nomadic movements between pastures. More broadly, Holzwart defines qazaqlïq as "the life of an adventurer," which includes the following elements: wandering; raids, plunder, and guerrilla warfare; existence outside the established political order; and a period during which a non-ruling prince demonstrates his leadership abilities and gathers supporters around him. Accordingly, qazaq/kazak is defined by him as "a member of a band of free warriors engaged in raids, plundering, or brigandage."

In his autobiography, Babur also uses the term qazaqlïq in the sense of "raids" or "guerrilla warfare." For example, Babur writes: "In that same winter, some of the soldiers who were unable to accompany us on our raids asked for permission to go to Andijan" (Ušbu qïš sipāhīlardïn baʿżïsï bizing bilä qazaqlïqlarda yür almay Andijānġa barmaqqa ruḫsat tilädilär). Elsewhere, in the Baburnama, for Babur the term qazaq refers to a warrior who leads a harsh and simple way of life.

Timur was probably the most famous qazaq fugitive-turned-ruler in the history of Central Eurasia. He began his political career as a vassal of Tughlugh Timur, the khan of Moghulistan who conquered Transoxiana in 1361. Before coming to power in 1370, Timur experienced at least two periods of qazaqlïq.

Similarly, the Russians recounted to Sigismund von Herberstein, the envoy of Emperor Maximilian I who was sent to the Grand Duchy of Moscow in 1517, a story about Timur's qazaq activities and his rise to power. According to Herberstein, the Russians considered Timur to have come from a lowly background and attributed his rise to plunder, claiming that in his youth he had been an exceptionally skilled robber. Timur was also known as the founder of an empire of qazaq origins. According to Carolus Gambarinus, the Ottomans feared the Ukrainian Cossacks, because both Timur and the Ottomans, in his view, had followed a path from being wanderers to becoming founders of empires.

In Turko-Persian sources, the term Özbek-Qazaq first appeared during the mid-16th century, in the Tarikh-i-Rashidi by Mirza Muhammad Haidar Dughlat, a Chagatayid prince of Kashmir, which locates Kazakh in the eastern part of Desht-i Qipchaq. According to Vasily Bartold, the Kazakhs likely began using that name during the 15th century.

An alternative and historical ethnonym for Kazakhs is "Alash". This name spreads a lot in Kazakh culture. Most commonly, Alash is the group of three jüzes, territorial and tribal divisions of Kazakhs. This word can be used as a synonym to Kazakh. The ethnonym "Alash" also was used to refer to Kazakhs by Nogais.

== History ==
The Kazakhs are direct descendants of the people of the Ulus of Jochi, who were referred to in sources as Tatars by the Russians and Ottomans; the term Uzbeks later began to be applied to them due to their conversion to Islam under Özbeg Khan (r. 1313–1341). The Kazakhs emerged as a result of the merging of Mongol, and various Inner Eurasian groups on the territory of Desht-i-Qipchaq. In the 15th century, under the leadership of two sultans from the Chinggisid dynasty Janibek Khan and Kerei Khan, the Kazakhs founded the Kazakh Khanate, which existed in the eastern part of the Kipchak Steppe until the mid-19th century. The modern Kazakhs form the most direct descendants of the Mongol Empire, along with the modern Mongols, and other Inner Asian nomadic empires.

Beatrice F. Manz has examined in detail the nature of the Turkic identity of the Mongol successor states. Manz convincingly argues that the Turkic Muslim nomadic elites of post-Mongol Central Asia and the Kipchak Steppe displayed a pronounced Mongol orientation and interprets the new Turkic-speaking collective identities of the post-Mongol period—such as the Chaghatays (Timurids), Kazakhs, and Uzbeks—as variants of Mongol identity. None of these peoples traced their origins to pre-Mongol Turkic states or peoples such as the Qarakhanids, Kipchaks, or Seljuks. Manz, in particular, interprets the formation of Kazakh identity as the result of the fragmentation of the Turco-Mongol groups that emerged within the Mongol Empire beginning in the fifteenth century. More specifically, she links this process to the division of the Jochid Ulus into the Kazakhs, who retained their nomadic way of life and the Shibanid Uzbeks who settled in Transoxiana.

Seen from a broader perspective, the Kazakhs belonged to the Chinggisid uluses, others being the Shibanid Uzbeks, Crimean Tatars, Manghits/Noghays, and Chaghatays (Moghuls and Timurids), who shared a common language (Turkic), political ideology (based on Mongol traditions), royal lineage (Chinggisids), ethnic identity Turco-Mongols ("Mongol Turks" Turk-i mughūl), and religion (Sunni Islam), and who still dominated much of the vast region stretching from the Crimea in the west to the Tien Shan Mountains in the east, and from southern Siberia in the north to northern India in the south during the post-Mongol period. Shoqan Walikhanov believed that when the Golden Horde began to disintegrate, the reasons why Kazakhs created Kazakh Khanate were in order to retain their nomadic territories and secure their rights in the lands where they migrated. The Kazakhs are the most northerly of the Central Asian peoples, inhabiting a large expanse of territory in northern Central Asia and southern Siberia known as the Kazakh Steppe. The tribal groups formed a powerful confederation that grew wealthy on the trade passing through the steppe lands along the fabled Silk Road.

=== Middle Ages ===
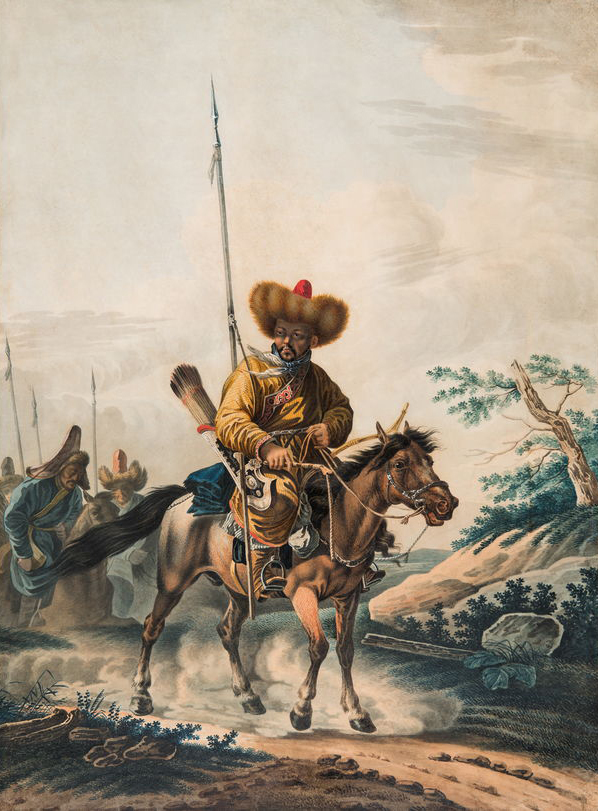
Vereshchagin Vasily, Kazakh on horseback, 1810

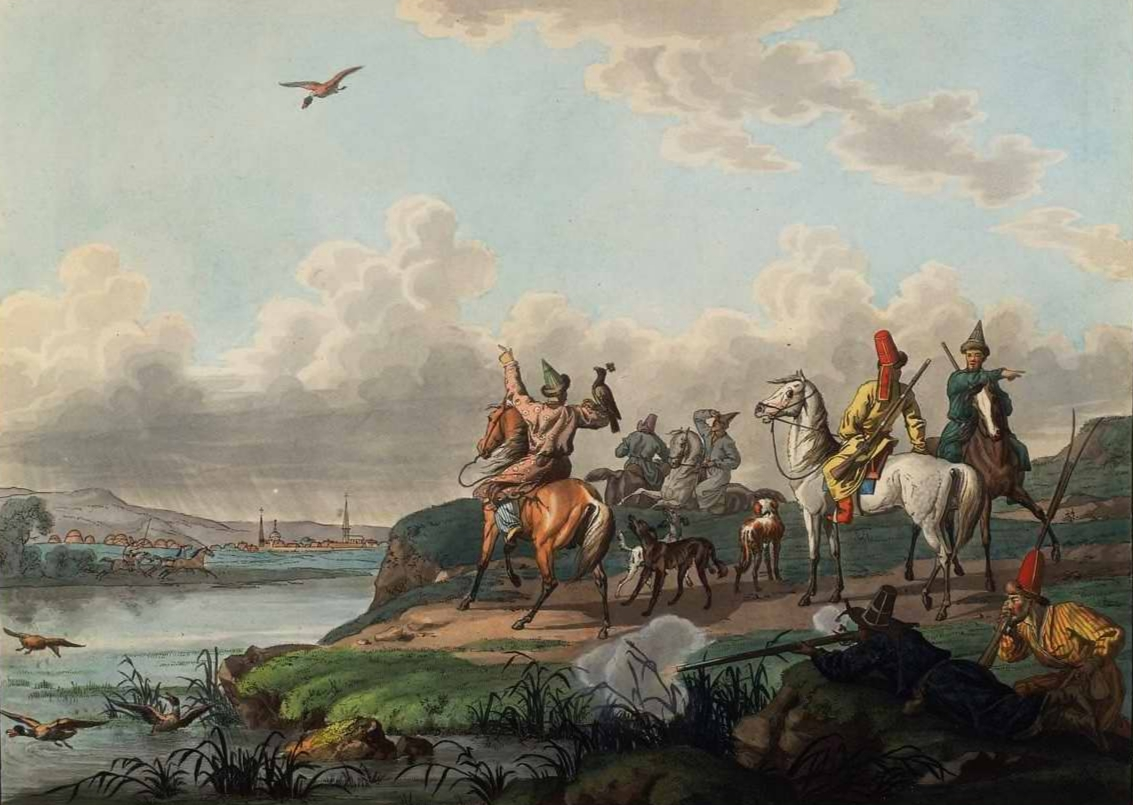
Eagle hunting among the Kazakhs. Emelyan Korneev

The exact place of origins of the Turkic peoples has been a topic of much discussion. Early Medieval Turkic peoples who migrated into Central Asia displayed genetic affinities with Ancient Northeast Asians, deriving around 62% of their ancestry from a gene pool maximized among Neolithic hunter-gatherers in the Amur region. There is also evidence for contact with Iranian, Uralic and Yeniseian peoples.

From the 11th century, the entire Great Steppe, stretching from the Danube and the northern shores of the Black Sea to the Irtysh and Lake Balkhash, and bounded in the south by the middle course of the Syr Darya and Khwarazm, was referred to in historical sources and scholarly literature as Desht-i Kipchak ("the Kipchak Steppe"). The name derived from the Kipchaks, a Turkic tribal confederation inhabiting the region, who were also known as the Cumans and Polovtsians. In the 13th century, the entire territory of the Great Steppe became part of the Ulus of Jochi, better known in historiography as the Golden Horde. The population of the Golden Horde was ethnically heterogeneous: while a portion consisted of sedentary peoples conquered by the Mongols, the majority comprised numerous Turkic and Mongol nomadic clans and tribes that had not yet developed into distinct ethnic groups.

According to historian Lee (2023), the ethnogenesis of the Kazakhs involved multiple components, including tribes of Mongol origin (among them the Duglats, Manghits, Qongirats, and Ushin, among others), as well as non-Mongol, Mongolic-speaking, and Turkic tribes from the Mongolian Plateau (such as the Jalayirs, Kereits, and Naimans), which had once formed part of the new Mongol ulus established by Genghis Khan in 1206. These components also included the indigenous Turkic tribes of Desht-i Kipchak, notably the Kipchaks and Kangly, as well as new tribal formations that emerged during the era of the Mongol Empire, including the Argyns. Lee notes that Soviet-era scholarship often argued that Kazakh tribes bearing the names of tribes from the Mongolian Plateau were in fact descended from indigenous Kangly and Kipchak elements. However, genetic studies conducted by both Kazakhstani and international researchers indicate that modern Kazakh tribes are actually descended from their 13th-century namesakes.

Fazlallah Khunji Isfahani, who took part in the campaign against the Kazakhs alongside Shaybani Khan in 1509, identifies the Kazakhs with the "Tatars," that is, the Mongols. His account begins as follows:

The terrible ferocity and violence of the army of the Qazaqs, who, previously, at the time of the appearance of Chinggis Khan, were called the army of the Tatars, are well known and mentioned by the Arabs and the Persians (ṣaulat va baʾs-i shadīd-i ʿaskar-i Qazzāq ki dar zamānhā-i sābiq ki biʿādī-i ẓuhūr-i Chingīz Khān būd, īshān-rā lashkar-i Tātār guftandī mashhūr va maẕkūr-i alsina-i ʿarab va ʿajam ast)

— Fazlallah Khunji Isfahani

Comparative analysis suggests that Kazakh nomads viewed both the periods of prosperity and decline of the Golden Horde, as well as the subsequent histories of the states that emerged following its fragmentation, as part of a cyclical historical process. In the oral tradition, this process was personified through prominent historical figures. Much of the Kazakh folklore relating to the history of medieval Eurasia is centred on notable individuals associated with the Jochi Ulus. Among the most prominent figures in the Kazakh narrative tradition are Genghis Khan, his eldest son Jochi, who became a celebrated subject of the poetic and musical works of many Kazakh akyns, the khans Batu Khan, Jani Beg, Tokhtamysh and Urus Khan, the military leader Edigu, and Timur, the emir of Samarkand.

According to Irina Erofeeva's analysis of Kazakh folklore, epic traditions, oral historical memory, and the cult of Jani Beg Khan, Kazakh nomads regarded the Golden Horde as their own state, which gradually weakened and contracted territorially, with each subsequent revival falling short of the previous one. This historical memory produced an idealized image of the Ulus of Jochi based on its former military and political power, which became increasingly romanticized in Kazakh society from the 18th to the 20th centuries.

After the death of Jochi Khan, his position was taken by Batu. Orda (Jochi's eldest son) voluntarily ceded precedence to his younger brother. They repeatedly yielded seniority to one another out of mutual respect. Their dispute was ultimately resolved by their grandfather Genghis Khan. At the same time, the Ulus of Jochi was effectively divided into two uluses (peoples). According to Rashid al-Din, "one half of Jochi Khan's army was commanded by him (Orda), and the other half by Batu". Batu, who did not display exceptional military talents but possessed notable administrative and political abilities, managed during the years 1242–1256, without waging major wars, to establish suzerainty over the Russian principalities, Georgia, Armenia, the Seljuk Sultanate of Rum, and several regions of Iran. A number of Golden Horde cities are associated with his name.

In 1269, at the kurultai held on the Talas River, Mengu-Timur, Baraq, and Kaidu accused Kublai of violating Mongol traditions, and being unworthy to rule the Mongol Empire. They recognized one another as independent rulers and concluded an alliance against the ruler of the Mongol Empire, Kublai, in case he attempted to challenge their independence.

Urus became khan of the Blue Horde in 1361. Muslim chroniclers described him as a strong and resolute ruler. Under his rule, the khan's authority strengthened, and he sought the throne of Sarai. From the Eastern Desht-i Kipchak, he advanced westward, seized Sarai, and began minting his own coins, before returning to the Ulytau and Syr Darya regions. He left governors in the Volga region but was unable to overcome Mamai and withdrew to the Syr Darya. Urus Khan's sons, Kutluk-Buga and Toqtakia, had twice defeated Tokhtamysh, who fled to Timur. Urus demanded Tokhtamysh's extradition, but Timur refused and prepared for war. Urus Khan's forces defeated several of Timur's commanders in minor battles, forcing Timur to retreat to Samarkand and Kesh in the winter of 1376–1377. Urus Khan died in 1377. Natanzi described him as "excessively stubborn, wrathful, and powerful".

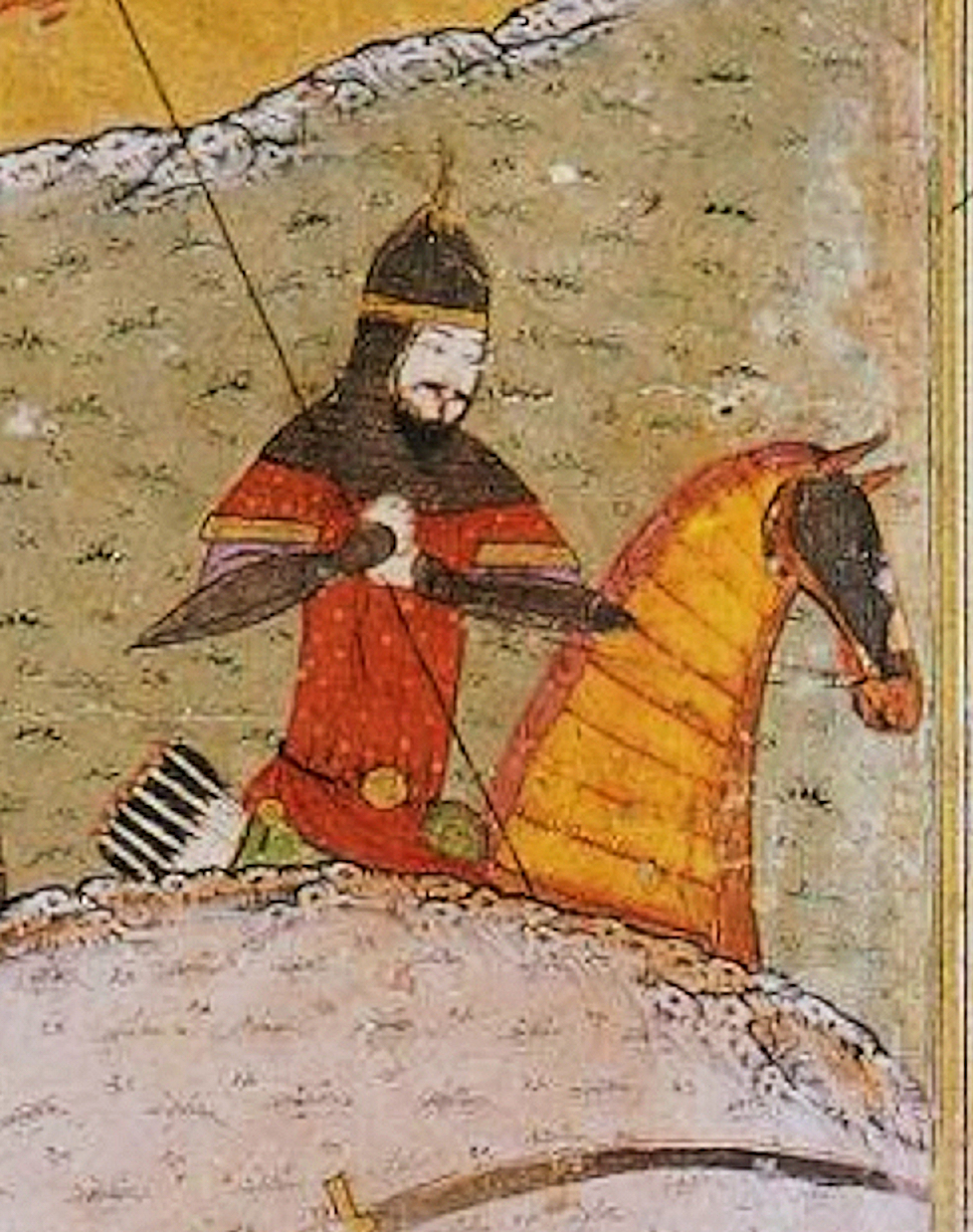
Tokhtamysh in the Timurid chronicle, Zafarnama "Book of Victory". A miniature depicting events of 1391

In the same year, with the support of the powerful ruler of the East, the Emir of Samarkand Timur, the Mangyshlak-based Tuqa-Timurid Tokhtamysh was installed as khan. From the Blue Horde capital of Sygnaq, he launched a western campaign and captured Sarai. He soon united the Jochid possessions under his rule, restoring strong khanly authority. His administration was headed by hereditary tribal elites, while the governing council consisted of four qarachi beks, representing the Shirin, Barin, Argyn, and Kipchak tribes. However, by 1395 Tokhtamysh entered into direct confrontation with Timur and was defeated, which cost him the Golden Horde throne. After him, no one was able to achieve power recognized throughout the Ulus of Jochi, and the Golden Horde began to disintegrate. Timur installed his own protégés from the Blue Horde, descendants of Urus Khan in Sarai, which by that time was effectively under his control, but they were unable to restore the former greatness of the Ulus of Jochi.

In 1423–1424, Barak, the grandson of Urus Khan and the son of Koirichak, seized power in the Blue Horde. However, his grandfather's "yurt" alone was not enough for him. Later, after defeating the khans Hundayt and Ulugh Muhammad, Barak captured Sarai and "ascended the khan's throne in the Desht-i Kipchak." In 1428, however, he was defeated by Ulugh Muhammad and was forced to retreat to the Blue Horde. Abandoning further struggle for Sarai, Barak turned his efforts against the rulers of Samarkand, the descendants of Timur. He recaptured Sighnaq from Ulugh Beg and declared: "The pastures of Sighnaq belong to me by law and customary right, because my grandfather Urus Khan built structures in Sighnaq." These were the final years of the Blue Horde's existence. Its rulers generally sought to restore the connection between the nomadic world of the Desht-i Kipchak and the settled population of the Syr Darya region. In the cities of Otrar, Sauran, Jend, and Barchkend, numerous buildings, mosques, khanqahs, and other charitable institutions existed. After Barak, power in the Eastern Desht-i Kipchak passed from the Tuqa-Timurids to the Shibanids. Barak Khan had one daughter and three sons. One of them, Abu Sa'id, also known as Janibek—became one of the founders of the Kazakh Khanate proper.

=== Kazakh Khanate ===
Abu'l-Khayr Khan, a descendant of Shiban, had disagreements with the sultans Kerei and Janibek, descendants of Urus Khan. These disagreements probably resulted from the crushing defeat of Abu'l-Khayr Khan at the hands of the Oirats. Kerei and Janibek moved with a large following of nomads to the region of Zhetysu on the border of Moghulistan and set up new pastures there with the blessing of the Chagatayid khan of Moghulistan, Esen Buqa II, who hoped for a buffer zone of protection against the expansion of the Oirats.

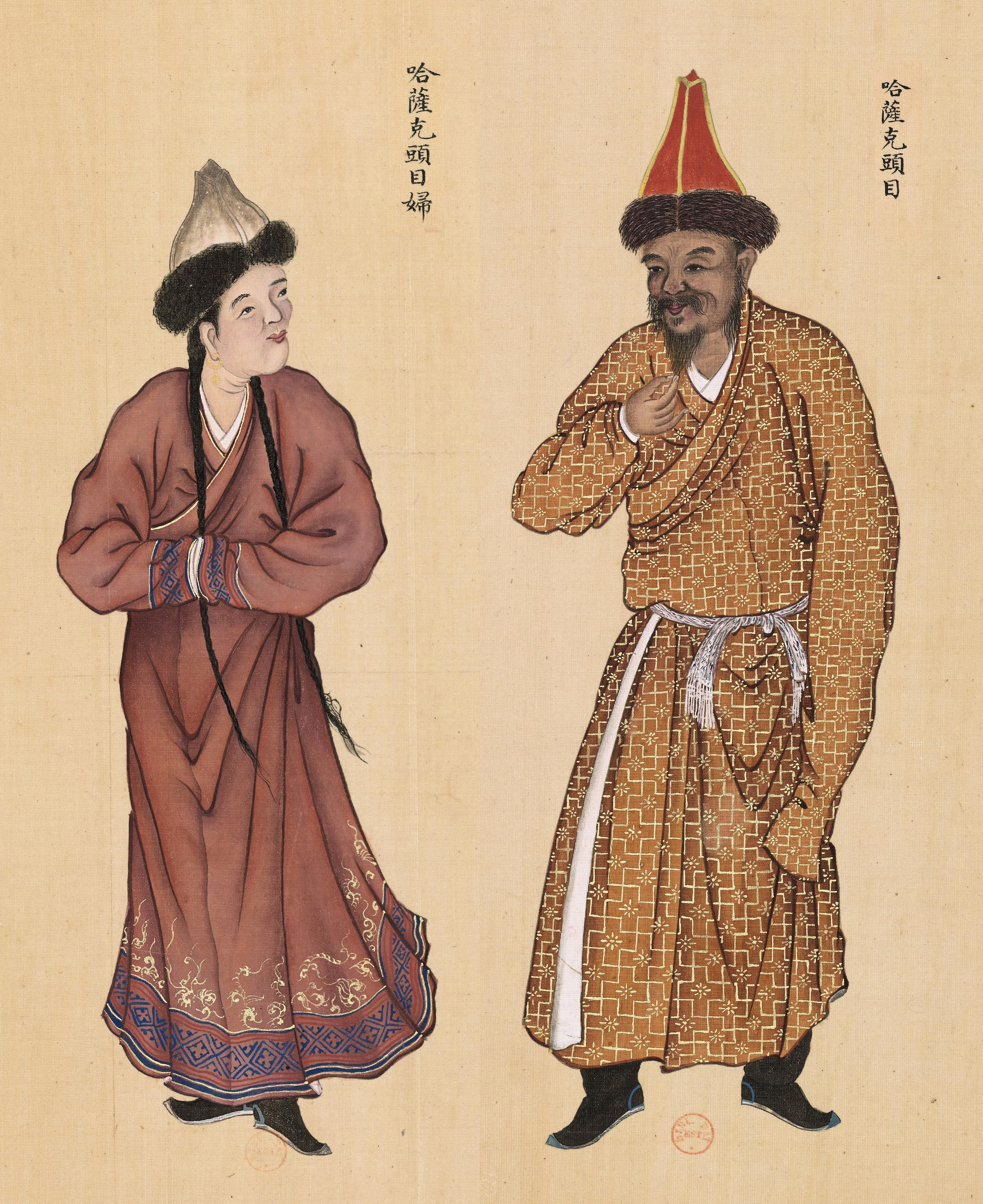
Noble Kazakhs. Portrait created by an artist of the Qing Dynasty in the second half of the 18th century

During the late 15th and throughout the 16th century, the Kazakhs created a nomadic empire extending westward to the Ural River and eastward to the Tien Shan Mountains regarded as a formidable power and feared by their neighbors and reportedly able to bring up to 200,000 horsemen into the field.

During the reign of the three sons of Kasym Khan, the authority of the khan weakened somewhat, leading to the eventual fragmentation of the Kazakh Khanate into three distinct "hordes": the Great Horde in southeastern Kazakhstan north of the Tien Shan, the Middle Horde in the central steppe near the Aral Sea, and the Little Horde between the Aral Sea and the Ural River. In these regions, the khan's power was often constrained by tribal leaders, known as sultans, and even more so by the beys and batyrs, heads of the clan-based communities. Although the khans nominally commanded a formidable military, their authority relied heavily on the loyalty of these local leaders.

The final son of Kasym Khan to rule, Haqnazar, overcame these challenges, reunited the three hordes, and expanded his power beyond the steppes. His reign was marked not only by the reunification of the Kazakh Khanate but also by his aggressive military campaigns, which included systematic raids into Transoxania. He brought under his control not only the Kazakh hordes but also the Bashkirs, Kyrgyz and Nogais, as well as territories such as the Kazan, Siberian, and Astrakhan khanates, and cities like Bukhara, Khiva, and Tashkent. According to Rychkov, Haqnazar's reign was marked by a brutal consolidation of power, where he exploited the instability of neighboring peoples, imposed heavy tributes, and severely restricted their movements and resources. He limited them to a single cooking pot per three households, confiscated livestock, goods, and even children, and prohibited land ownership and movement across certain rivers. These actions rendered these peoples impoverished and submissive, but they also strengthened his dominion across the region.

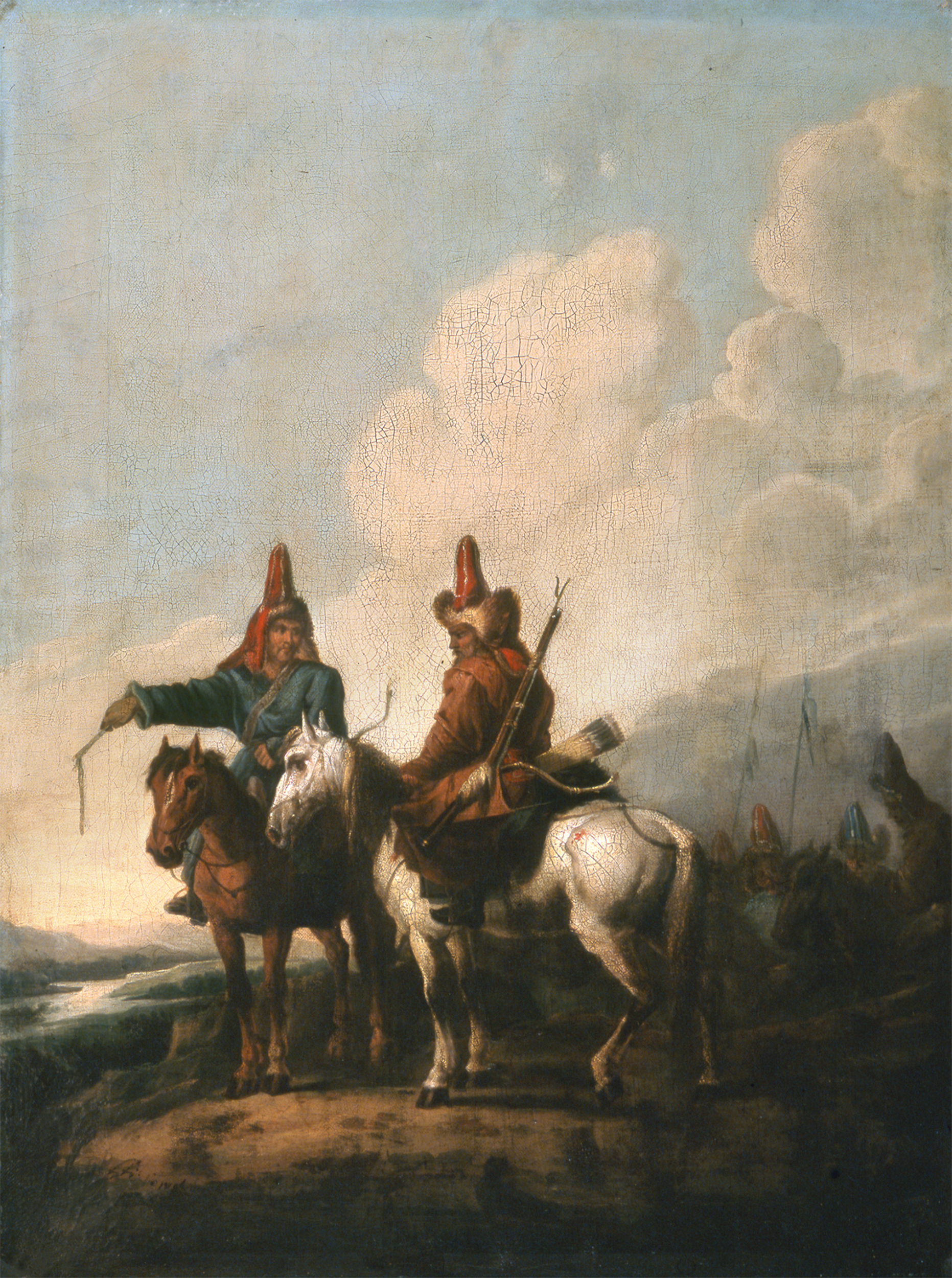
Aleksander Orłowski, Two Kazakhs, 1809

His successors continued these military campaigns, including Tawakul Khan, who briefly captured Samarkand. However, by the early 17th century, the khanate's internal unity once again began to erode, and central power weakened further, leading to a period of fragmentation and the rise of numerous smaller, local rulers. After Tauke's death in 1715/1718, the Kazakh Khanate lost its unity, and the three hordes effectively became separate khanates.

=== 18th century ===
By the turn of the 18th century, the Chinggisid states entered a period of sharp decline. In 1736, the capital of the Crimean Khanate was for the first time plundered and burned by Russian troops. A few years later, in 1740, the Uzbek states in Transoxiana and Khwarazm/Khiva were subordinated by the Turkmen conqueror Nader Shah, who overthrew the Safavid dynasty and brought the Mughals under his control. Earlier, in the late 17th century, the Mongols of the Northern Yuan, unable to resist the Dzungars, submitted to the Manchus.

During this time, the Little Horde took part in the 1723–1730 war against the Dzungar Khanate, following the invasion known as the "Great Disaster." Under the leadership of Abul Khair Khan, the Kazakhs between 1727 and 1730, the united Kazakh militia won several battles with the Dzungars.

After the death of Galdan Tseren, turmoil began in the Dzungar Khanate, in which the Kazakhs played a notable role in the internecine struggle of the Dzungars. Between 1752 and 1755, the final military clashes took place between the Kazakhs of the Middle Jüz and Dzungar Khanate. During these conflicts, Ablai Sultan supported one side and then the other, becoming involved in their internal wars and leading the army of the Middle Jüz on military campaigns into Dzungaria. Feudal strife, the active involvement of Kazakh rulers in these conflicts, and frequent Kazakh incursions into Dzungaria contributed to the demoralization of Oirat society, the destabilization of khan's authority, and the loss of its capacity for organized defense. As a result, the Qing Empire encountered little serious resistance in 1755, destroying the last nomadic empire in the history of Central Asia.

In 1756–1757, battles took place between Kazakh military detachments and the large armies of the Qing Empire. Heavy and bloody fighting occurred in the northeastern part of the region and in Jetisu. However, due to the enemy's significant numerical and technological superiority, Ablai was forced in the summer of 1757 to cease hostilities and begin negotiations with the Qing command to conclude peace and establish relations with the new southeastern neighbor.

The fall of the Dzungar Khanate altered the balance of power in Central Asia. For a time, the Kazakh khanates became the most dominant political and military force in the region of Inner Asia. At the same time, the positions of the Russian Empire and Qing China strengthened, and they began to shape the system of international relations in the northwestern part of Central Asia. Ablai Khan pursued a policy of maneuvering between Russia and China, which for a time allowed the Kazakh Khanate to maintain relative independence. Later, Ablai and the Kazakh lords who supported him embarked on a course of military conquest, conducting plundering raids against the population of the Altai, as well as into Kyrgyzstan and Central Asia. He also cooperated with the Russian authorities in pursuing the Kalmyks who had fled from the Volga, while brutally repressing ordinary members of Kazakh society who were dissatisfied with his policies. He later became the last khan whose power was recognized throughout the Kazakh steppe. After his death, his son Wali Khan abandoned this independent policy and recognized the suzerainty of the Russian Empire.

=== Russian and Soviet period ===
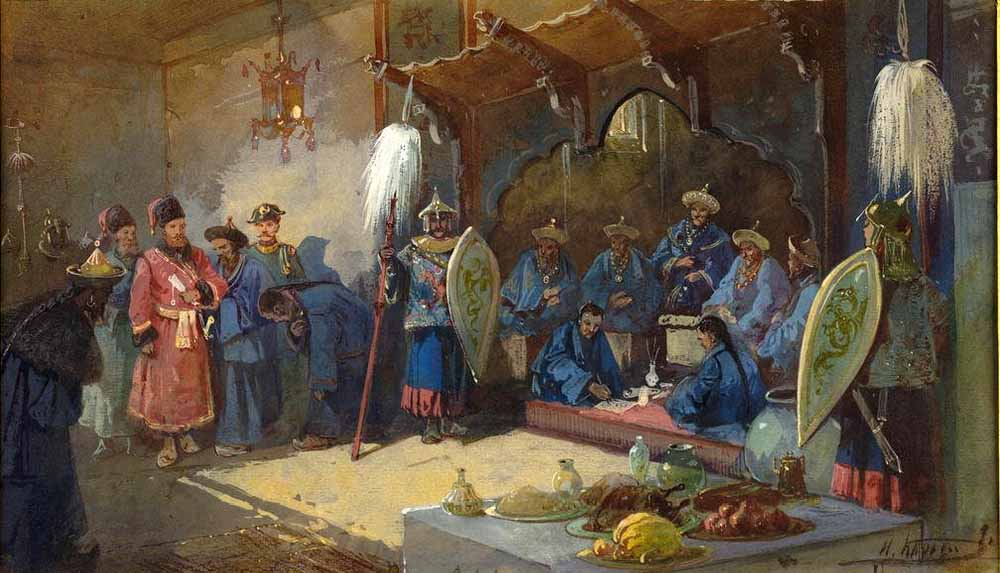
Cossacks in the Kazakh Horde, 19th century, Nikolay Karazin

Aleksei Chernyshyov, Kazakhs, 1849

In A. I. Maksheev's words, "during the whole eighteenth and the beginning of the nineteenth century, the Kazakhs were Russian subjects in name only. In reality they preserved their independence. The Russians had to separate themselves from them with fortresses and troops and did not even dare to cross the Line." However, the situation began to change in the 1820s.

In 1822, the khanate institution among the Kazakh hordes was formally abolished, which led to the uprising of Sultan Qasym in 1824–1827. The last serious effort to revive the khanate was undertaken by Sultan Kenesary Qasymov, whose resistance against Russian authorities began in 1837. He declared himself khan and, with varying success, led an armed struggle until his death in 1847.

Due to its incorporation into the Russian Empire, Kazakh intellectuals led a cultural renaissance that surpassed those of other Central Asian peoples. Russian schooling brought modern ideas to the steppe, and figures like Shoqan Walikhanov and Abay Kunanbayev adapted these ideas to the specific needs of Kazakh society, creating a secular culture unparalleled in other parts of Asian Russia.

In the wake of the Russian Revolution, the Alash Orda government was formed in 1917 as an attempt to secure Kazakh autonomy. Although it existed only in name, Alash Orda represented the Kazakh push for self-rule. The Bolshevik Red Army eventually defeated White Russian forces in the region by 1920, and Kazakhstan was incorporated into the Soviet Union.

Despite their nomadic lifestyle, the Kazakhs were one of the most literate indigenous groups in Central Asia, making them stand out in the region. But the Soviet government pursued a policy of forced collectivization, which devastated the Kazakh population. Between 1926 and 1939, Kazakhstan's population decreased by nearly one-fifth, with 1.5 million deaths from mostly starvation and related diseases, others as a result of violence. Thousands of Kazakhs fled to China, but most did not survive.

Kazakhstan became a full Soviet republic in 1936. The Virgin Lands Program, launched in the 1950s, opened northern Kazakhstan to wheat farming by Slavic settlers, the program that, over the course of several decades, led to an ecological disaster that severely impacted the Aral Sea. During the Soviet period, Kazakhstan's strategic importance grew, notably with the establishment of the Soviet space-launch center and nuclear testing sites on its territory. From 1959 to 1986, Dinmukhamed Kunayev, the first secretary of the Communist Party of Kazakhstan, dominated the region's politics. His pragmatic leadership balanced the interests of both Kazakhs and Russians. However, Kunayev's removal by Mikhail Gorbachev in 1986 led to the first serious riots in the Soviet Union during the 1980s, signaling widespread discontent among the Kazakh population.

Kazakhstan declared sovereignty on October 25, 1990, and became fully independent on December 16, 1991, after the Soviet Union collapsed.

=== Early Mentions of the Kazakhs in Western Literature ===
One of the earliest mentions of the Kazakhs in Western literature was in Sigismund von Herberstein's Notes on Muscovite Affairs (1549):

Vltra Vuiatkam & Cazan, ad Permiæ vicinia Tartari habitant, qui Tumenskij, Schibanskij, & Cosatzkij vocantur.
Beyond Vuiatkam and Cazan, in the vicinity of Permia, dwell the Tartars, who are called Tumenskij, Schibanskij, and Cosatzkij.

In the 17th century, Russian convention seeking to distinguish the Qazaqs of the steppes from the Cossacks of the Imperial Russian Army suggested spelling the final consonant with ⟨х⟩ instead of ⟨к⟩, which was officially adopted by the USSR in 1936.

- Kazakh – Казах, /kazax/
- Cossack – Казак, /kazak/

The Ukrainian term Cossack probably comes from the same Kipchak etymological root, meaning wanderer, brigand, or independent free-booter.

=== Oral history ===
Like many people who live a nomadic lifestyle, Kazakhs keep an epic tradition of oral history which goes back centuries. It is most commonly relayed in the form of song (kyi) and poetry (zhyr), which typically tell the stories of Kazakh national heroes.

The Kazakh oral tradition sometimes has political themes. The highly influential Kazakh poet Abai Qunanbaiuly viewed it as the ideal way to transmit the pro-Westernization ideals of his colleagues. The Kazakh oral tradition has also overlapped with ethnic nationalism, and has been used to transmit pride in Kazakh identity.

== Language ==
Kazakh belongs to the Kipchak (Northwestern) group of the Turkic language family. Kazakh is characterized, in distinction to other Turkic languages, by the presence of /s/ in place of reconstructed proto-Turkic */ʃ/ and /ʃ/ in place of */tʃ/; furthermore, Kazakh has /d͡ʒ/ where other Turkic languages have /j/.

Kazakh, like most of the Turkic language family lacks phonemic vowel length, and as such there is no distinction between long and short vowels.

Kazakh was written with the Arabic script until the mid-19th century, when a number of educated Kazakh poets from Muslim madrasahs incited a revolt against Russia. Russia's response was to set up secular schools and devise a way of writing Kazakh with the Cyrillic alphabet, which was not widely accepted. By 1917, the Arabic script for Kazakh was reintroduced, even in schools and local government.

In 1927, a Kazakh nationalist movement sprang up against the Soviet Union but was soon suppressed. As a result, the Arabic script for writing Kazakh was banned and the Latin alphabet was imposed as a new writing system. In an effort to Russianize the Kazakhs, the Latin alphabet was in turn replaced by the Cyrillic alphabet in 1940 by Soviet interventionists. Today, there are efforts to return to the Latin script, and in January 2021 the government announced plans to switch to the Latin alphabet.

Kazakh is a state (official) language in Kazakhstan. It is also spoken in the Ili region of the Xinjiang Uyghur Autonomous Region in the People's Republic of China, where the Arabic script is used, and in western parts of Mongolia (Bayan-Ölgii and Khovd province), where Cyrillic script is in use. European Kazakhs use the Latin alphabet.

== Genetic studies ==
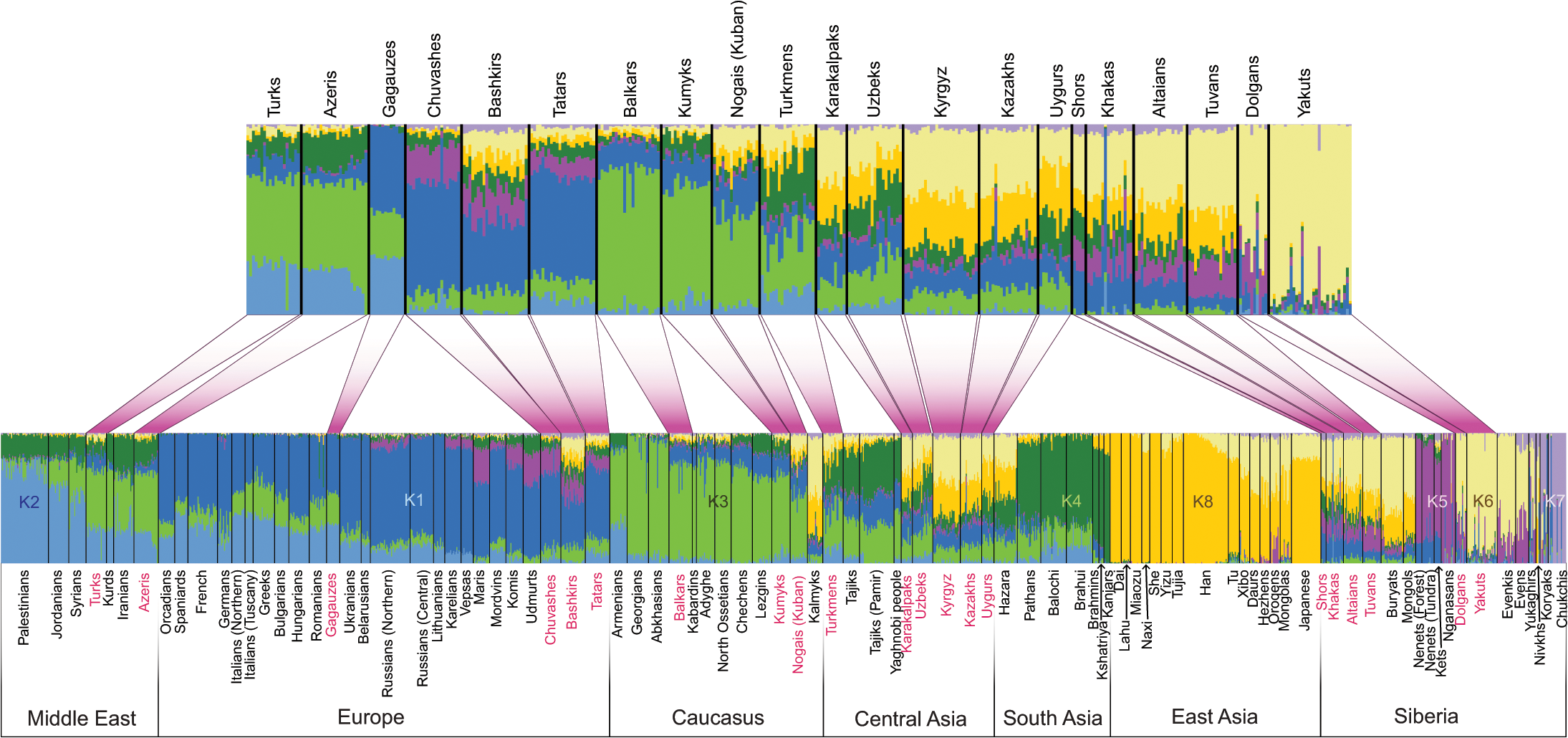
Population structure of Turkic-speaking populations in the context of their geographic neighbors across Eurasia.

Genomic research confirmed that Kazakhs originated from the admixture of several tribes. Kazakhs have predominantly East Eurasian ancestry, and harbor two East Asian-derived components: one dominant component commonly found among Northeastern Asian populations (associated with the Northeast Asian "Devil's Gate Cave" sample from the Amur region), and another minor component associated with historical Yellow River farmers, peaking among northern Han Chinese. According to one study, West Eurasian related admixture among Kazakhs is estimated at 35% to 37.5% in two Kazakh populations. Another study estimated a lower average Western admixture of slightly less than 30%. These results are inline with historical demographic information on northern Central Asia. Neighboring Karakalpaks, Kyrgyz, Tubalar, and the Xinjiang Ölöd tribe, have the strongest resemblance to the Kazakh genome.

The ratio of the two components in the anthropological type of modern Kazakhs is: Mongoloid - 70%, Caucasoid - 30%.Kazakhs are characterized by significant anthropological homogeneity. The peculiarities of the ethnogenesis process did not lead to significant anthropological differences between representatives of the Senior, Middle and Junior Zhuzes. Regional anthropological differences exist, but they are small.

According to the latest research of population genetics, mainly of autosomal markers and Y-chromosome polymorphism, it is believed that during the 13th to 15th centuries that the Kazakh ethnicity emerged. Anthropological studies, such as those by Orazak Ismagulov, show that the Kazakhs, who formed in the 13th century, are indistinguishable from the nomadic peoples of the Golden Horde. This is further supported by cluster analysis conducted by L.T. Yablonsky, who found that Kazakhs are genetically closest to the nomads of the Golden Horde (Lower Volga), while modern Tatars, Uzbeks, and Chuvash are more closely related to the urban population of that period.

The traditional genealogy (shezhire) among Kazakhs is organized along the male line (following a patrilineal principle), where clan origin is passed from father to son. Modern genetic studies based on Y-chromosome analysis confirm the correspondence between the clan system and the patrilineal genetic structure of the Kazakh population.

A study on allele frequency and genetic polymorphism by Katsuyama et al., found that Kazakhs cluster together with Japanese people, Hui people, Han Chinese, and Uyghurs in contrast to West Eurasian reference groups.

A 2020 genetic study on the Kazakh genome, by Seidualy et al., found that the Kazakh people formed from highly mixed historical Central Asian populations. Ethnic Kazakhs were modeled to derive about 63.2% ancestry from an East Asian-related population, specifically from a Northeast Asian source sample (Devil's Gate 1), 30.8% ancestry from European-related populations (presumably from Scythians), and ~6% ancestry from a broadly South Asian population. Overall, Kazakhs show their closest genetic affinity with other Central Asian populations, namely the Kalmyks, Karakalpaks, Kyrgyz, and Altaians, but also Mongolians and Tuvans.

A genetic study published in the journal Nature in 2021 showed that Western Kazakh tribal groups belonging to the Alshin union share common patrilineal (father-to-son) roots. The study analyzed 40 SNP and 17 STR markers on the Y-chromosome in 330 Western Kazakh individuals. This revealed a high degree of relatedness within haplogroup C2a1a2-M48. Three independent lines of analysis indicated that the Alimuly and Bayuly clans share a common ancestor who lived approximately 650 years ago, identified in the shezhire as Emir Alau. According to the study, roughly two-thirds of Western Kazakhs may descend from this lineage. The research also noted the accumulation of specific haplogroups in subclans of other lineages, confirming the correspondence between the traditional clan structure and the genetic structure of the steppe population. Today, the Alshin population exceeds 2 million people, and approximately 1.5 million Western Kazakhs are carriers of haplogroup C2a1a2-M48, Y15552. This supports the genealogy connecting them to their common ancestor, Emir Alau, and reinforces the traditional concept of patrilineal descent.

=== Maternal lineages ===
According to mitochondrial DNA studies (where sample consisted of only 246 individuals), the main maternal lineages of Kazakhs are: D (17.9%), C (16%), G (16%), A (3.25%), F (2.44%) of East-Eurasian origin (55%), and haplogroups H (14.1), T (5.5), J (3.6%), K (2.6%), U5 (3%), and others (12.2%) of West-Eurasian origin (41%).

Gokcumen et al. (2008) tested the mtDNA of a total of 237 Kazakhs from Altai Republic and found that they belonged to the following haplogroups: D(xD5) (15.6%), C (10.5%), F1 (6.8%), B4 (5.1%), G2a (4.6%), A (4.2%), B5 (4.2%), M(xC, Z, M8a, D, G, M7, M9a, M13) (3.0%), D5 (2.1%), G2(xG2a) (2.1%), G4 (1.7%), N9a (1.7%), G(xG2, G4) (0.8%), M7 (0.8%), M13 (0.8%), Y1 (0.8%), Z (0.4%), M8a (0.4%), M9a (0.4%), and F2 (0.4%) for a total of 66.7% mtDNA of Eastern Eurasian origin or affinity and H (10.5%), U(xU1, U3, U4, U5) (3.4%), J (3.0%), N1a (3.0%), R(xB4, B5, F1, F2, T, J, U, HV) (3.0%), I (2.1%), U5 (2.1%), T (1.7%), U4 (1.3%), U1 (0.8%), K (0.8%), N1b (0.4%), W (0.4%), U3 (0.4%), and HV (0.4%) for a total of 33.3% mtDNA of West-Eurasian origin or affinity. Comparing their samples of Kazakhs from Altai Republic with samples of Kazakhs from Kazakhstan and Kazakhs from Xinjiang, the authors have noted that "haplogroups A, B, C, D, F1, G2a, H, and M were present in all of them, suggesting that these lineages represent the common maternal gene pool from which these different Kazakh populations emerged."

In every sample of Kazakhs, D (predominantly northern East Asian, such as Japanese, Okinawan, Korean, Manchu, Mongol, Han Chinese, Tibetan, etc., but also having several branches among indigenous peoples of the Americas) is the most frequently observed haplogroup (with nearly all of those Kazakhs belonging to the D4 subclade), and the second-most frequent haplogroup is either H (predominantly European) or C (predominantly indigenous Siberian, though some branches are present in the Americas, East Asia, and northern and eastern Europe).

=== Paternal lineages ===
In a sample of 54 Kazakhs and 119 Altaian Kazakh, the main paternal lineages of Kazakhs are: C (66.7 and 59.5%), O (9 and 26%), N (2 and 0%), J (4 and 0%), R (9 and 1%) respectively.

A total of 464 representatives of the Western Kazakh tribes of Kazakhstan (Western Kazakhs, n = 405) and Uzbekistan (Karakalpakstan Kazakhs, n = 59) were examined by the Yfiler Plus set. The data are available in the YHRD under accession numbers YA006010 and YA006009. Genetic analysis (AMOVA and MDS) did not show significant differences between the two groups (Kazakhstan and Karakalpakstan Kazakhs) in terms of Y-chromosome diversity. Both groups are characterized by haplogroup C2a1a2 as a founder effect, which dominated two of the three tribes: Alimuly (67%), Baiuly (74.6%), and Zhetiru (25.8%).

The study analyzed haplotype variation at 15 Y-chromosomal short-tandem-repeats obtained from 1171 individuals from 24 tribes representing the three socio-territorial subdivisions (Senior, Middle and Junior zhuz) in Kazakhstan to comprehensively characterize the patrilineal genetic architecture of the Kazakh Steppe. In total, 577 distinct haplotypes were identified belonging to one of 20 haplogroups; 16 predominant haplogroups were confirmed by SNP-genotyping. The haplogroup distribution was skewed towards C2-M217, present in all tribes at a global frequency of 51.9%. The structure analysis of the 1164 individuals indicated the presence of 20 ancestral groups and a complex three-subclade organization of the C2-M217 haplogroup in Kazakhs, a result supported by the multidimensional scaling analysis. Additionally, while the majority of the haplotypes and tribes overlapped, a distinct cluster of the O2 haplogroup, mostly of the Naiman tribe, was observed.

== Diaspora ==
=== Russia ===
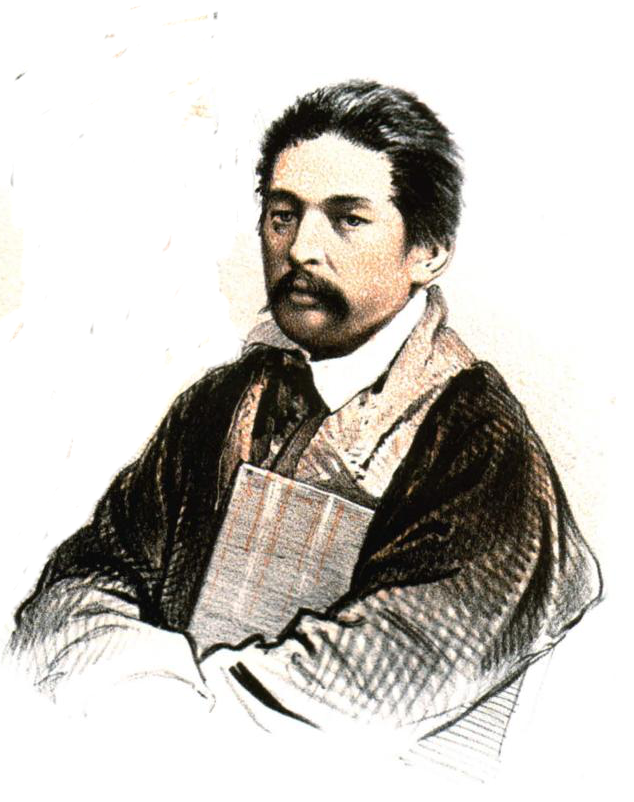
Muhammad Salyk Babazhanov – Kazakh anthropologist, a member of Russian Geographical Society.

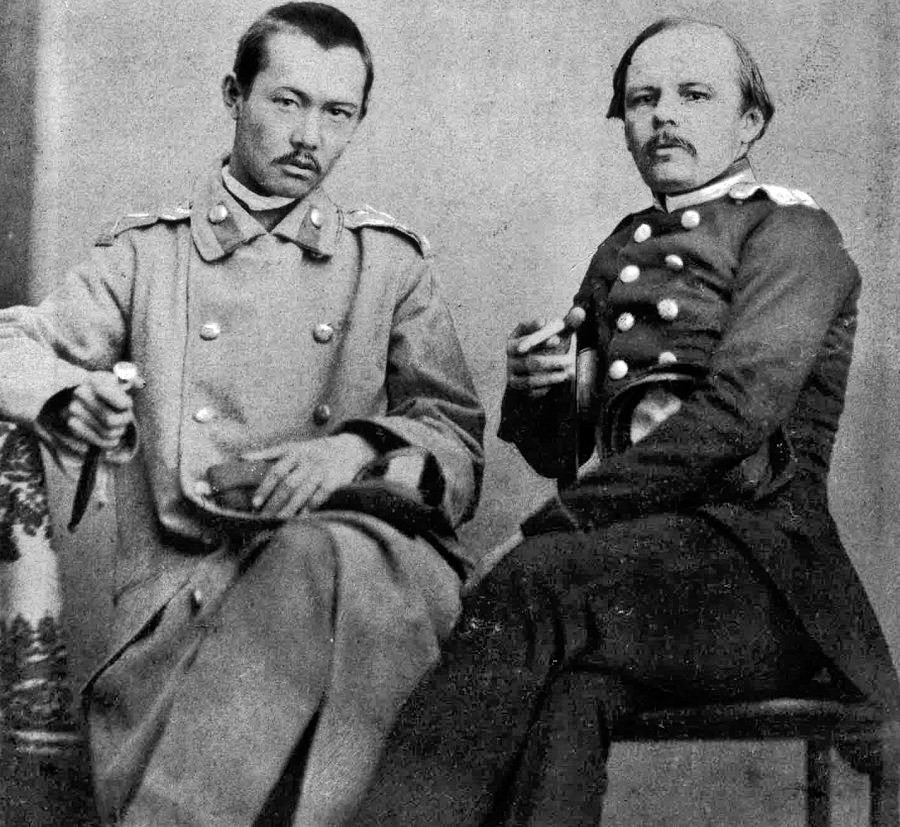
Shoqan Walikhanov and Fyodor Dostoyevsky

According to the 2010 census, there were 647,000 Kazakhs living in the Russian Federation. However, according to the first deputy chairman of the World Association of Kazakhs, Kaldarbek Naimanbayev, who spoke in 2003, there were over 1 million ethnic Kazakhs living in Russia.

Most Russian Kazakhs live along the Russian-Kazakh border. The largest communities live in Astrakhan (149,415), Orenburg (120,262), Omsk (78,303), and Saratov Oblast (76,007). In a number of regions, there are several dozen schools where the Kazakh language is taught as a separate subject, however, secondary education in the Kazakh language is not available in Russia.

In Russia, the Kazakh population lives primarily in the regions bordering Kazakhstan. According to latest census (2002) there are 654,000 Kazakhs in Russia, most of whom are in the Astrakhan, Volgograd, Saratov, Samara, Orenburg, Chelyabinsk, Kurgan, Tyumen, Omsk, Novosibirsk, Altai Krai and Altai Republic regions. Though ethnically Kazakh, after the dissolution of the Soviet Union in 1991, those people acquired Russian citizenship.

Ethnic Kazakhs of Russia national censuses data
1939	%	1959	%	1970	%	1979	%	1989	%	2002	%	2010	%	2020	%^{1}
356 646	0.33	382 431	0.33	477 820	0.37	518 060	0.38	635 865	0.43	653 962	0.45	647 732	0.45	591 970	0.45
^{1}:of those who responded

=== China ===
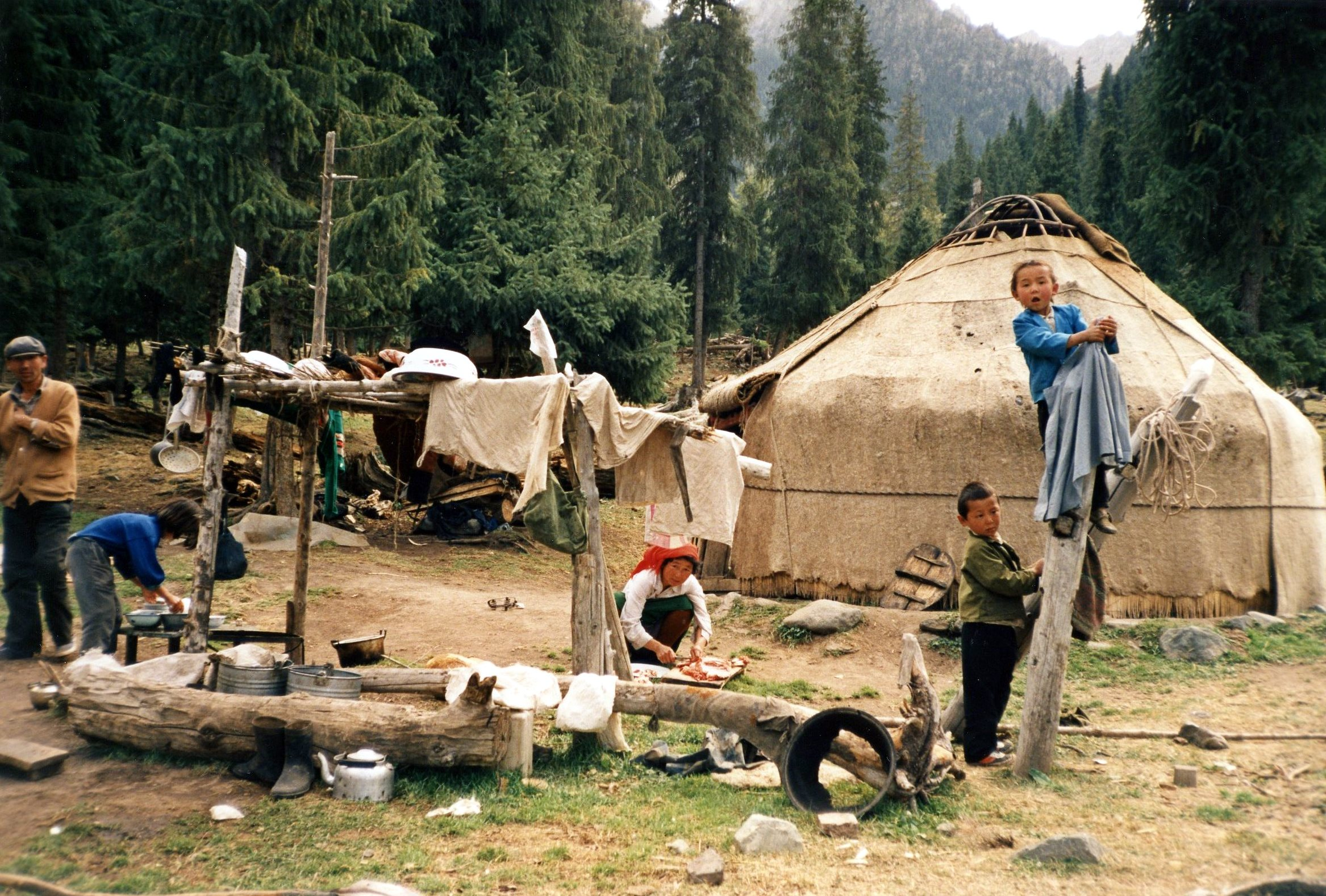
Kazakhs in Xinjiang, China, 1987

Kazakhs migrated into Dzungaria in the 18th century after the Dzungar genocide resulted in the native Buddhist Dzungar Oirat population being massacred.

Kazakhs, called "哈萨克族" in Chinese (pinyin: Hāsàkè Zú; lit. 'Kazakh nationality') are among 56 ethnic groups officially recognized by the People's Republic of China. According to the census data of 2020, Kazakhs had a population of 1,562,518, ranking 18th among all ethnic groups in China. Thousands of Kazakhs fled to China during the 1932–1933 famine in Kazakhstan.

In 1936, after Sheng Shicai expelled 30,000 Kazakhs from Xinjiang to Qinghai, Hui led by General Ma Bufang massacred their fellow Muslim Kazakhs, until there were 135 of them left.

From Northern Xinjiang, over 7,000 Kazakhs fled to the Tibetan-Qinghai plateau region via Gansu and were wreaking massive havoc so Ma Bufang solved the problem by relegating Kazakhs to designated pastureland in Qinghai, but Hui, Tibetans, and Kazakhs in the region continued to clash against each other. Tibetans attacked and fought against the Kazakhs as they entered Tibet via Gansu and Qinghai. In northern Tibet, Kazakhs clashed with Tibetan soldiers, and the Kazakhs were sent to Ladakh. Tibetan troops robbed and killed Kazakhs 640 kilometres (400 miles) east of Lhasa at Chamdo when the Kazakhs were entering Tibet.

In 1934, 1935, and from 1936 to 1938, Qumil Elisqan led approximately 18,000 Kerey Kazakhs to migrate to Gansu, entering Gansu and Qinghai.

In China there is one Kazakh autonomous prefecture, the Ili Kazakh Autonomous Prefecture in the Xinjiang Uyghur Autonomous Region and three Kazakh autonomous counties: Aksai Kazakh Autonomous County in Gansu, Barkol Kazakh Autonomous County and Mori Kazakh Autonomous County in the Xinjiang Uyghur Autonomous Region.

At least one million Uyghurs, Kazakhs and other Muslims in Xinjiang have been detained in mass detention camps, termed "reeducation camps", aimed at changing the political thinking of detainees, their identities, and their religious beliefs. But authorities in China have defended that the detention centers were in fact vocational education & training centers set up to deradicalize radicalized residents against the "3 evil forces" of religious extremism, terrorism and separatism.

=== Mongolia ===
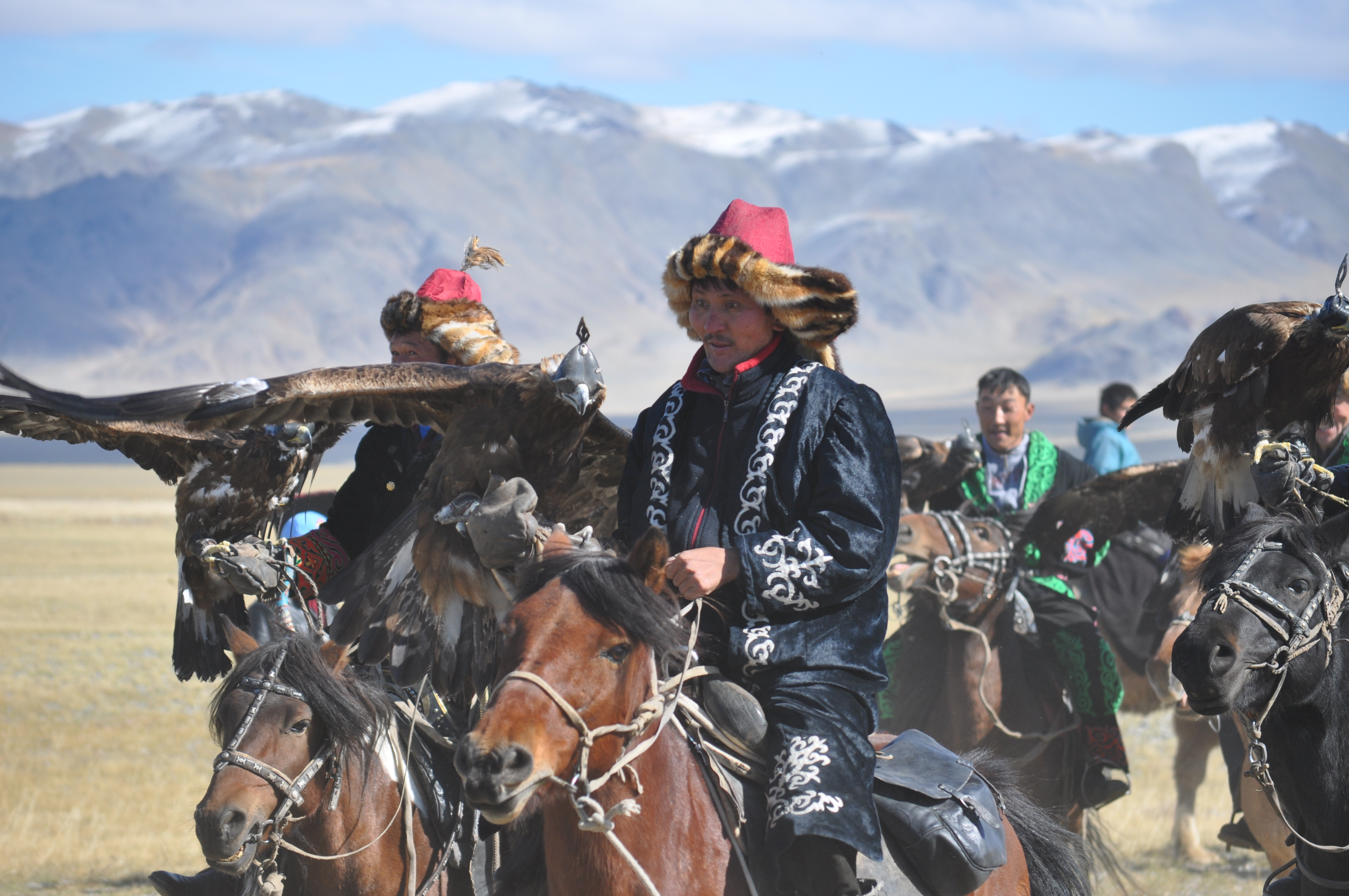
Kazakh hunters with eagles in Bayan-Ölgii Province, Mongolia

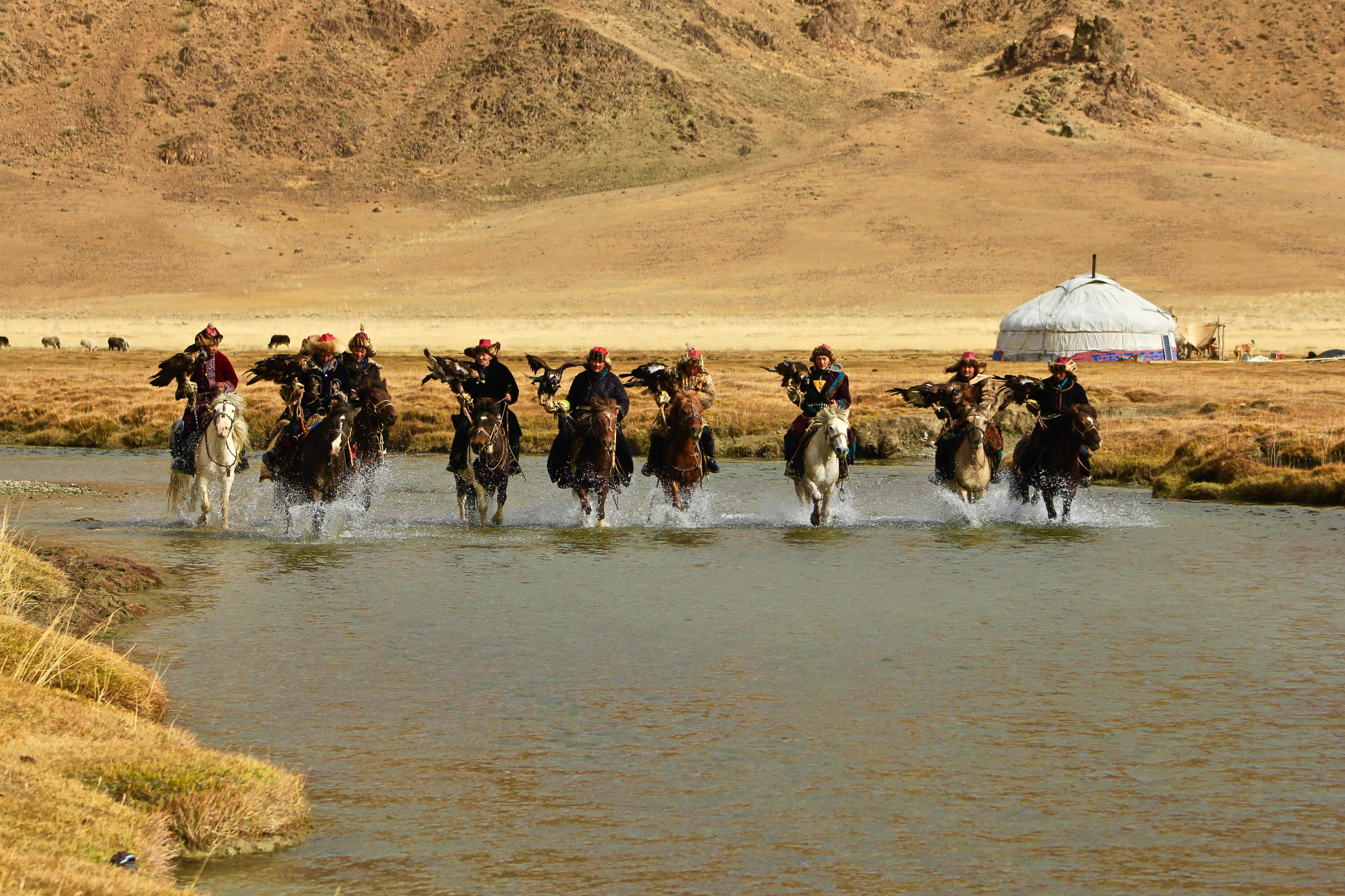
Golden Eagle traditional and folk festival competition part. Western Mongolia, Bayan Ulgii province

In the 19th century, the advance of the Russian Empire troops pushed Kazakhs to neighboring countries. In around 1860, part of the Middle Jüz Kazakhs came to Mongolia and were allowed to settle down in Bayan-Ölgii, Western Mongolia; for most of the 20th century they remained an isolated, tightly knit community. Ethnic Kazakhs (so-called Altaic Kazakhs or Altai-Kazakhs) live predominantly in Western Mongolia in Bayan-Ölgii Province (88.7% of the total population) and Khovd Province (11.5% of the total population, mostly in Khovd city, Khovd and Buyant sums). Additionally, a number of Kazakh communities can be found in various cities and towns spread throughout the country. Some of the major population centers with a significant Kazakh presence include Ulaanbaatar (90% in khoroo #4 of Nalaikh düüreg), Töv and Selenge provinces, Erdenet, Darkhan, Bulgan, Sharyngol (17.1% of population total) and Berkh cities.

Kazakhs face prejudice and discrimination in Mongolia. For example, Mongolian president Punsalmaagiin Ochirbat made remarks near the end of his term in 1997 about his intention to sterilise all Kazakhs in Mongolia if they refused to leave the country within 24 hours. His remarks were received negatively by the press and human rights organisations. The Office of the United Nations High Commissioner for Human Rights (OHCHR) has set frameworks to put an end to online discrimination of minorities as part of their programs in Mongolia, and in 2017 the OHCHR reported a temporary cessation of ethnic tensions. Fears over the reemergence of tensions have been raised due to funding cuts to the OHCHR's programs.

Ethnic Kazakhs of Mongolia national censuses data
1956	%	1963	%	1969	%	1979	%	1989	%	2000	%	2010	%	2020	%
36,729	4.34	47,735	4.69	62,812	5.29	84,305	5.48	120,506	6.06	102,983	4.35	101,526	3.69	120,999	3.81

=== Uzbekistan ===
As of the beginning of 2021, more than 821,000 ethnic Kazakhs lived in Uzbekistan. They live mostly in Karakalpakstan and northern Uzbekistan.

=== Iran ===
During the Qajar period, Iran bought Kazakh slaves who were falsely masqueraded as Kalmyks by Khivan and Turkmen slave traders.

Kazakhs of the Aday tribe inhabited the border regions of the Russian Empire with Iran since the 18th century. The Kazakhs made up 20% of the population of the Trans-Caspian region according to the 1897 census. As a result of the Kazakhs' rebellion against the Russian Empire in 1870, a significant number of Kazakhs became refugees in Iran.

Iranian Kazakhs live mainly in Golestan Province in northern Iran. According to ethnologue.org, in 1982 there were 3000 Kazakhs living in the city of Gorgan. Since the fall of the Soviet Union, the number of Kazakhs in Iran decreased because of emigration to their historical motherland.

=== Afghanistan ===
Kazakhs fled to Afghanistan in the 1930s escaping Bolshevik persecution. Kazakh historian Gulnar Mendikulova cites that there were between 20,000 and 24,000 Kazakhs in Afghanistan as of 1978. Some assimilated locally and cannot speak the Kazakh language.

According to official figures, 13,000 ethnic Kazakhs from Afghanistan have immigrated to Kazakhstan since the early 1990s.

As of 2021, there are about 200 Kazakhs remaining in Afghanistan according to Kazakhstan's foreign ministry. Locals claim that many live in Kunduz and others in Takhar Province, Baghlan Province, Mazar-i-Sharif and Kabul.

Afghan Kypchaks are a group of Taymani Aimaqs who are of Kazakh origin. They mainly reside in Obe district to the east of the western Afghanistan's province of Herat, between the rivers Farāh Rud and Hari Rud.

=== Turkey ===
Turkey received refugees from among the Pakistan-based Kazakhs, Turkmen, Kirghiz, and Uzbeks numbering 3,800 originally from Afghanistan during the Soviet–Afghan War. Kayseri, Van, Amasya, Çiçekdağ, Gaziantep, Tokat, Urfa, and Serinyol received via Adana the Pakistan-based Kazakh, Turkmen, Kirghiz, and Uzbek refugees numbering 3,800 with UNHCR assistance.

In 1954 and 1969, Kazakhs migrated into Anatolia's Salihli, Develi and Altay regions. Turkey became home to refugee Kazakhs.

The Kazakh Turks Foundation (Kazak Türkleri Vakfı) is an organization of Kazakhs in Turkey.

== Religion ==
The majority of religious Kazakhs are Sunni Muslims of the Hanafi school of jurisprudence. According to Supreme Mufti Yerzhan Mayamerov, the Spiritual Administration of Muslims of Kazakhstan follows values traditional among Muslims in Kazakhstan, is Sunni, follows the Hanafi school in matters of jurisprudence, and Maturidism in matters of theology.

The Jochid ancestors of the Kazakhs began converting to Islam under Özbeg Khan in the early 14th century. Islam was subsequently promoted by the Golden Horde, particularly from the late 14th century onward, while further Islamization of the Kazakh steppe took place during the 15th and 16th centuries through the activities of Sufi orders. However, the early 16th-century historical work Mihman-nama-yi Bukhara, written by Fazlallah Khunji Isfahani, reports that the Kazakhs retained some non-Muslim practices, including idol worship and the enslavement of Muslims. It is therefore generally considered that Islam had become established among the Kazakhs by the time of the formation of the Kazakh Khanate.

During the 18th century, Russian influence toward the region rapidly increased throughout Central Asia. Led by Catherine, the Russians initially demonstrated a willingness in allowing Islam to flourish as Muslim clerics were invited into the region to preach to the Kazakhs, whom the Russians viewed as "savages" and "ignorant" of morals and ethics. However, Russian policy gradually changed toward weakening Islam by introducing pre-Islamic elements of collective consciousness. Such attempts included methods of eulogizing pre-Islamic historical figures and imposing a sense of inferiority by sending Kazakhs to highly elite Russian military institutions. In response, Kazakh religious leaders attempted to bring in pan-Turkism, though many were persecuted as a result. During the Soviet era, Muslim institutions survived only in areas that Kazakhs significantly outnumbered non-Muslims, such as non-indigenous Russians, by everyday Muslim practices. In an attempt to conform Kazakhs into Communist ideologies, gender relations and other aspects of Kazakh culture were key targets of social change.

In more recent times, however, Kazakhs have gradually employed a determined effort in revitalizing Islamic religious institutions after the fall of the Soviet Union. Most Kazakhs continue to identify with their Islamic faith, and even more devotedly in the countryside. Those who claim descent from the original Muslim soldiers and missionaries of the 8th-century command substantial respect in their communities. Kazakh political figures have also stressed the need to sponsor Islamic awareness. For example, the Kazakh Foreign Affairs Minister, Marat Tazhin, recently emphasized that Kazakhstan attaches importance to the use of "positive potential Islam, learning of its history, culture and heritage."

According to the 2009 Kazakhstani national census, 39,172 ethnic Kazakhs are Christians (0.4% of all Kazakhstani Kazakhs). Although mostly Sunni, many ethnic Kazakhs in Iran converted to Shia Islam after having settled among Persian and Turkmen Shia Muslims in Golestan. Shia Kazakhs were culturally indistinguishable from Sunni Kazakhs except by religion.

== Culture ==
=== Literature ===
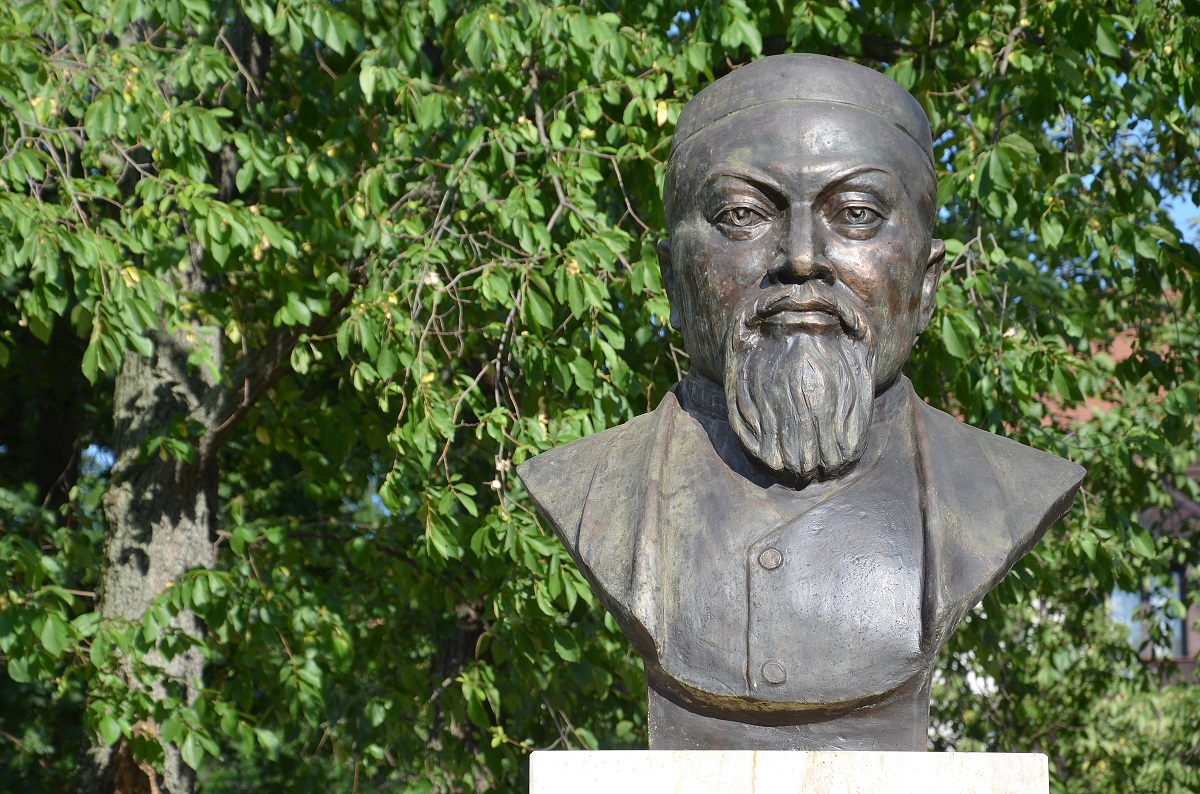
Statue of Abai Qunanbaiuly in Budapest, Hungary

Kazakh literature originated in a rich oral tradition preserved for centuries by zhyraus and aqyns. Zhyraus performed heroic epics (zhyrs) and didactic works (tolgau and terme), while aqyns were known for poetic improvisation and public competitions. Notable representatives of oral poetry include Bukhar Kalkamanuly, Makhambet Otemisuly, Shortanbai Kanayuly, Bazar Ondasuly, and Jambyl Jabayev. Classic Kazakh epics include Er Targyn and Alpamys.

The oral poetry of the 19th century in Kazakhstan was remarkably rich and diverse, surpassing any other Turkic oral literary tradition in its variety. During this period, two major factors began to shape the development of Kazakh literature. First, members of the tribal aristocracy started collecting Kazakh folklore and examples of oral literature. Second, under the influence of Western culture, written Kazakh literature began to emerge and take shape. The founders of modern Kazakh literature were Shoqan Walikhanov, Ybyrai Altynsarin, and Abai Qunanbaiuly, who combined national traditions with the achievements of Russian and Western literature. Abai's poetry marks the beginning of modern Kazakh literature. In his works, he blended the traditional verse of the akyns (folk poets) with Russian poetry, especially the works of Alexander Pushkin and Mikhail Lermontov. He translated Pushkin's poems into Kazakh and incorporated some of these translations into the repertoire of anshis (traditional folk singers), whose style was more lyrical than that of the akyns or zhyraus (epic bards). In doing so, Abai established a new direction for the development of Kazakh poetry, one that had a profound influence on the literature of the 20th century.

Following the Russian Revolution of 1905, restrictions on Kazakh-language publications were eased, leading to the emergence of newspapers such as Aiqap, Alash, and Qazaq. Many early 20th-century writers, including Ahmet Baitursynuly, were active in educational and political reform movements. Turmagambet Iztileuuly also made a significant contribution through his translations of Persian classical literature into Kazakh.

=== Traditional Kazakh weapons ===
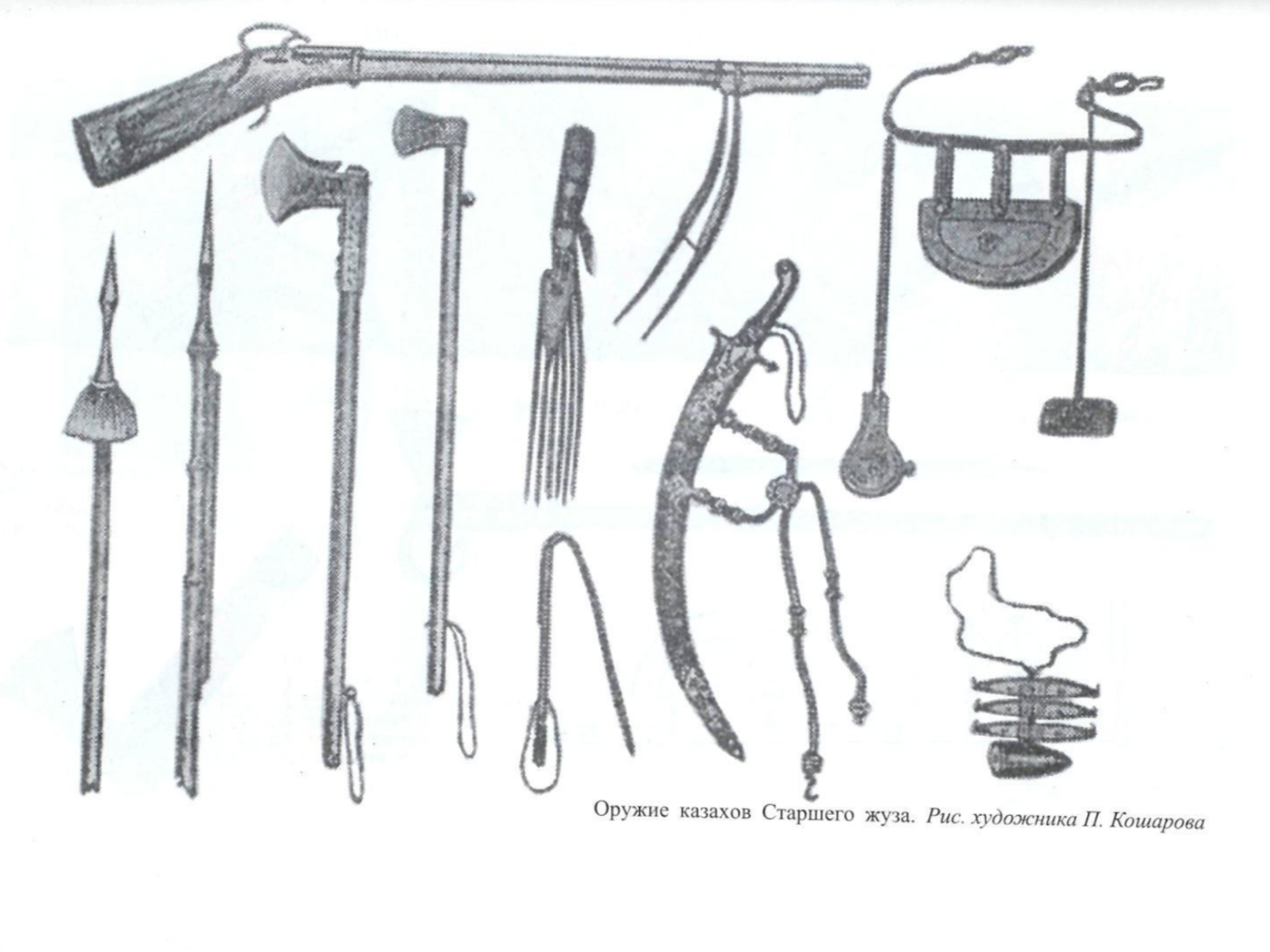
Weapons of the Kazakhs of the Senior Zhuz

Traditional Kazakh weapons can be conditionally divided into several groups: long-range weapons matchlock firearms (beren myltyq), bows with arrows and quivers (sadaq); medium-range weapons pikes and spears (naiyza); striking and chopping weapons axes (aibalta), clubs (soiyl), and maces (shoqpar); cutting and stabbing weapons sabres (qylysh, semser, zhekeauyz) and daggers (qanjar). According to data from the memorial and cult monuments of Mangystau and Ustyurt, Kazakh bows (sadak) belonged to the type of composite bows. Based on drawings by John Castle, it is suggested that some examples could have reached considerable sizes approximately 120–130 cm. This assumption is based on a comparison between depictions of a bow and a matchlock firearm, which are shown as being roughly equal in length; it is known that Kazakh firearms could reach 150 cm or more. The average length of Kazakh arrows preserved in the St. Petersburg Museum is 60–70 cm; most specimens exceed 70 cm.

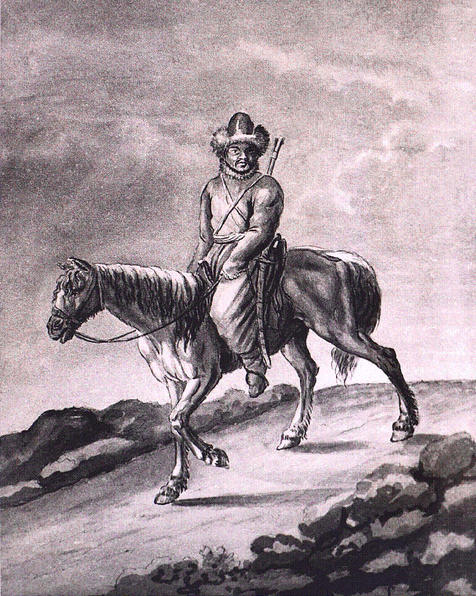
Kazakh warrior as depicted by John Castle

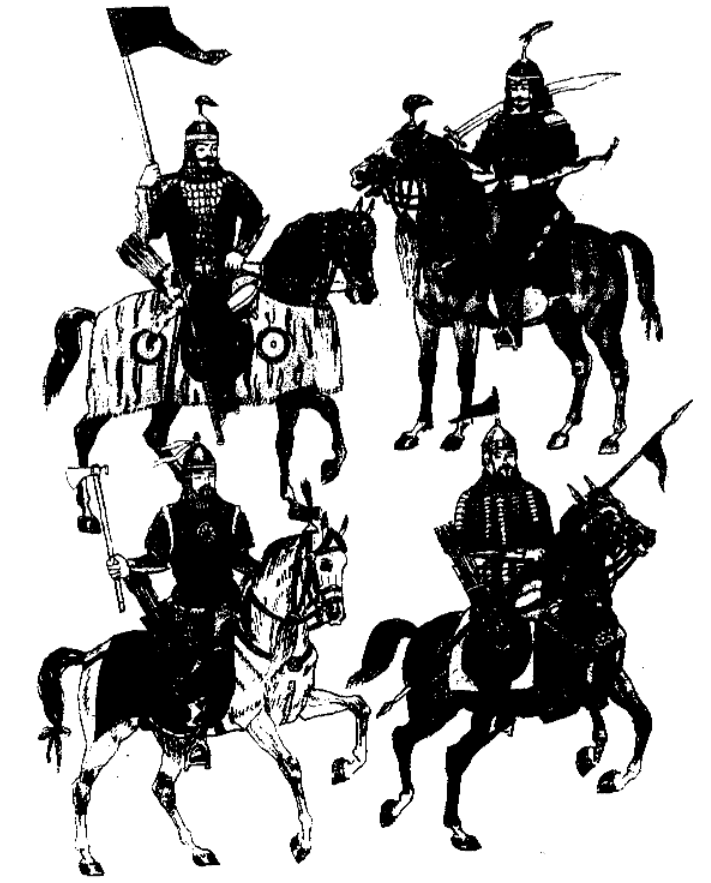
Kazakh warriors (15th–18th centuries), Kazakhstan National Encyclopedia illustration

Firearms were purchased in Bukhara, Khiva, Tashkent, and partly in Russia. There is also evidence of local production. Gunpowder was often produced independently by the Kazakhs. Lead bullets and fuses were also made by the Kazakhs themselves. Defensive weapons included cuirasses and chainmail (saut), as well as helmets. Sources from the 17th–19th centuries repeatedly mention their use. Military equipment also included special belts and cartridge pouches.

The Kazakhs produced most of their weapons themselves. Shafts were made from birch, pine, poplar, and willow. Bowstrings were made from sheep intestines and arrowheads were mainly crafted from iron or animal bones. Craft and metallurgical centers for weapon production in Kazakhstan were located in the Syr Darya region, particularly in the city of Turkistan. Weapons were decorated with engraving, inlay, silver ornaments, colored stone inserts, niello, and filigree. In the 16th century, Kazakh blacksmiths manually forged single- and double-barreled matchlock guns (myltyq). For more convenient shooting from a supported position, they were equipped with wooden stocks and stands. The last ruler of the Kazakh Khanate whose authority was recognized by all three zhuzes, Tauke Khan (1672–1715), significantly strengthened the state's military organization. In Tauke Khan's legal code, the Zheti Zhargy, it was stated that no Kazakh should appear at public gatherings without weapons: "An unarmed man had no voice, and younger men were not obliged to give him a place."

=== Folklore ===
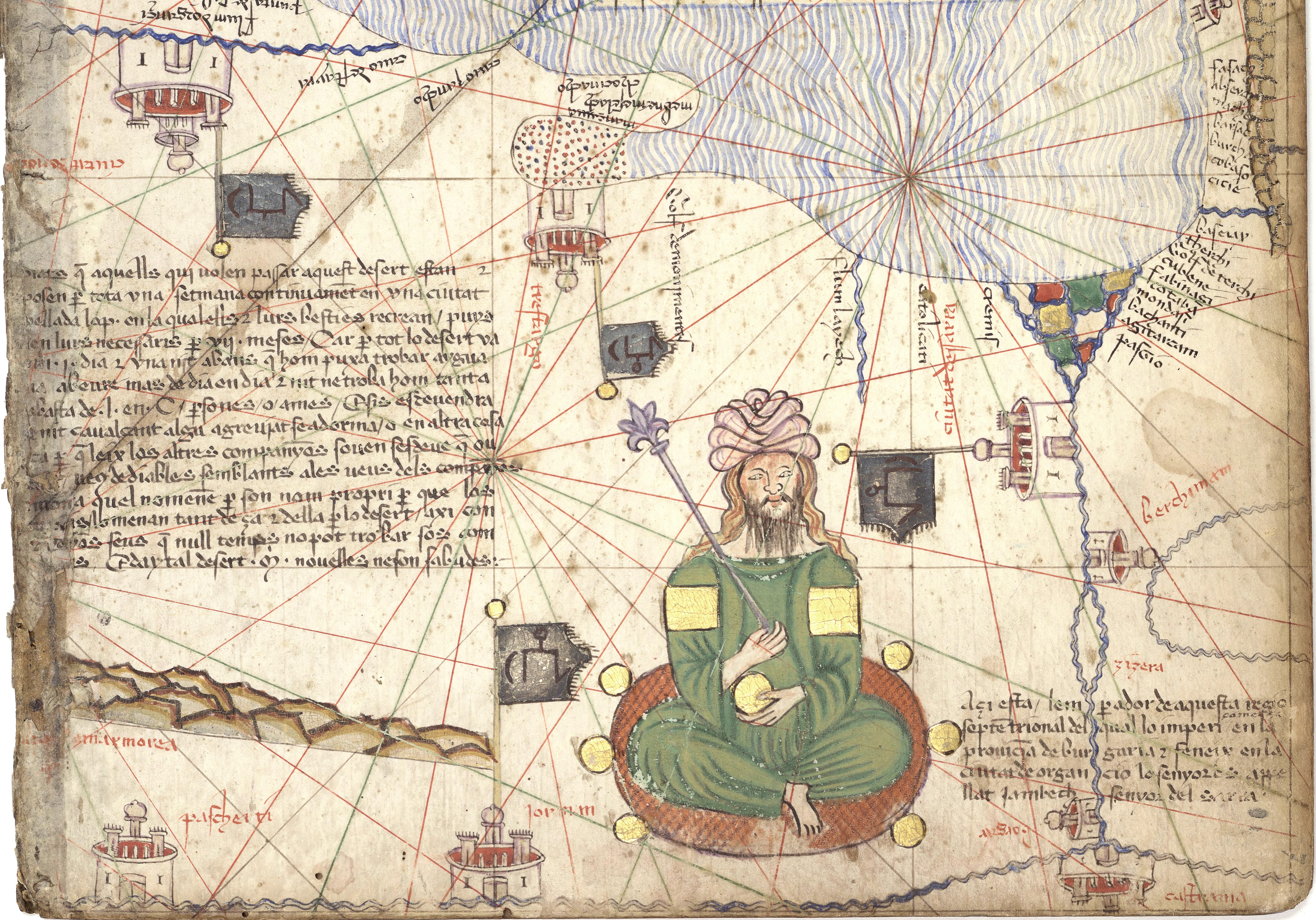
Jani Beg of the Golden Horde, depicted in the Catalan Atlas (1375), with the flag "Here resides the emperor of this northern region whose empire starts in the province of Bulgaria and ends at the city of Organcio. The sovereign is named Jambech, Lord of the Sarra."

The vast majority of Kazakh folklore materials related to the medieval period of Eurasian history are associated with specific historical figures of the Ulus of Jochi. Among the most popular characters of Kazakh narrative folklore are Genghis Khan (1206–1227), his eldest son Khan Jochi (? – c. 1227), the khans Batu (1243–1255), Jani Beg (1342–1357), and Tokhtamysh (1380–1406), Urus Khan (1368–1377), Edigu (early 1390s–1419), and the Samarkand emir Timur (1370–1405), who founded the Timurid state in Transoxiana.

In a comprehensive analysis of the corpus of Kazakh folklore from the 18th to early 20th centuries, Jani Beg Khan appears as either the main hero or one of the central figures in the largest number of oral traditions, legends, epics, and tales of the Kazakh steppe nomads, devoted to the socio-political and cultural history of their ancestral past in the medieval period.

During Jani Beg's reign, Islam spread not only in the western part of the Golden Horde within the country, but also in its eastern territories, which is also reflected in Kazakh epics, tales, and legends. According to the testimony of I. G. Andreev, recorded in 1782–1785 in the Tarbagatai region "from oral accounts" of clan elders of the Nayman tribe of the Middle Zhuz, Jani Beg was considered, after Genghis Khan and his closest descendants, "the most renowned of all" in the "Great and Little Bukharias" and adjacent steppe regions; it was also reported that he "ruled in Turkestan and introduced the Muhammadan law among them." According to other materials recorded from local Naymans, in folklore texts Khan Jani Beg is presented not only as a "ruler," but also as the "founder of the city of Turkestan, …better known as Hazrat." According to Kazakh accounts, it was from there that he allegedly "enlightened them with the faith of Muhammad".

An important narrative tradition of the Kazakhs is "Alasha Khan", which appears in oral narratives as the first Kazakh khan. According to Zh. Sabitov, the figure of Alasha Khan may correspond to Urus Khan.

=== Cuisine ===
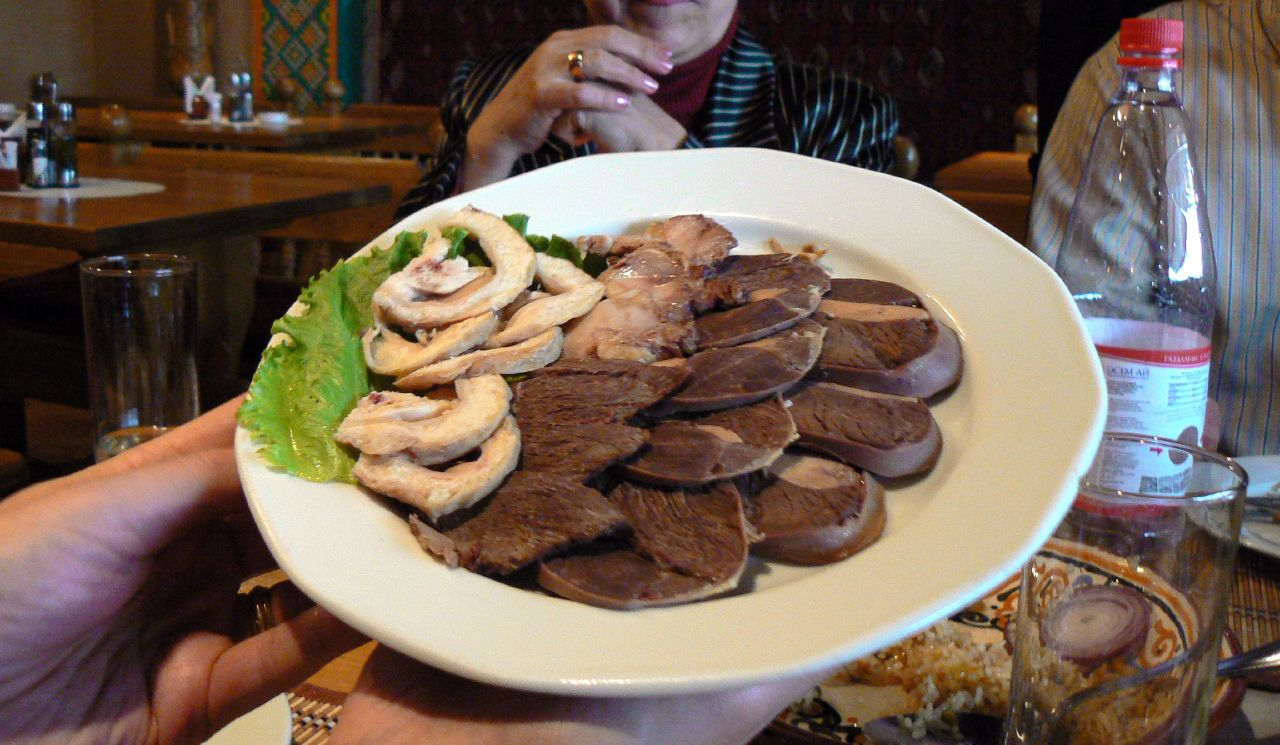
A platter of horse meat served traditionally as an appetizer.

Traditional Kazakh cuisine revolves around lamb and horse meat, as well as a variety of dairy milk products. For hundreds of years, Kazakhs were herders who raised fat-tailed sheep, Bactrian camels, and horses, relying on these animals for transportation, clothing, and food. The cooking techniques and major ingredients have been strongly influenced by the nation's nomadic way of life. For example, most cooking techniques are aimed at long-term preservation of food. There is a large practice of salting and drying meat so that it will last, and there is a preference for sour milk, as it is easier to save in a nomadic lifestyle.

Besbarmak, a dish consisting of boiled horse or lamb meat, is the most popular Kazakh dish. Besbarmak is usually eaten with a boiled pasta sheet, and a meat broth called shorpa, and is traditionally served in Kazakh bowls called kese. Other popular meat dishes are Qazı (which is a horse meat sausage that only the wealthy could afford), shuzhuk (horse meat sausages), kuyrdak (also spelled kuirdak, a dish made from roasted horse, sheep, or cow offal, such as heart, liver, kidneys, and other organs, diced and served with onions and peppers), and various horse delicacies, such as zhal (smoked lard from horse's neck) and zhaya (salted and smoked meat from horse's hip and hind leg). Pilaf (palaw) is the most common Kazakh rice dish, with vegetables (carrots, onions, or garlic) and chunks of meat. The national drinks are kumys (fermented mare's milk) and tea.

=== Traditions ===
Kazakhs are known for their hospitality, and so many Kazakh traditions are based on this ethnic feature. Some traditions have been lost, but some have been rediscovered. Below are some of the traditions that continue to play a role in the modern Kazakh society:

Konakasy (Kazakh: қонақасы; "konak" – guest, "as" – food) – a tradition to welcome a guest and make his stay as enjoyable as one can by providing food, lodge, entertainment. Depending on the circumstances under which a guest had come from, he is either called "arnayy konak" (Kazakh: арнайы қонақ) – a specially invited guest, "kudayy konak" (Kazakh: құдайы қонақ) – a casual traveller, or "kydyrma konak" (Kazakh: қыдырма қонақ) – an unexpected visitor.

Korimdik (Kazakh: көрімдік; "koru" – to see) – a tradition of presenting a person with a gift to congratulate him on a gain in his life. The custom is called korimdik, if a gain is related to a person or an animal (e.g. seeing a person's daughter-in-law or a newborn animal for the first time), and baygazy (Kazakh: байғазы), if the gain is material.

Shashu (Kazakh: шашу – to scatter) – a tradition to shower heroes of an occasion with sweets during some festivity. Kazakhs believe that collected delights bring luck.

Bata (Kazakh: бата – blessing) – a form of poetic art, typically given by the most respected or the eldest person to express gratitude for the provided hospitality, give blessing to a person who is about to enter a new phase in life, go through a challenging experience or travel.

Tusau kesu (Kazakh: тұсау кесу – to cut ties) – a tradition to celebrate the first attempts of a child to walk. The legs of a child are tied with a string of white and black colors symbolizing the good and the bad in life. The tie is then cut by a female relative who is energetic and lively in nature, so that the child acquires her qualities. After the string has been cut, it is burnt.

Kyz uzatu (Kazakh: қыз ұзату) – the first wedding party organized by the parents of a bride. The literal translation is "to see off a daughter".

Betashar (Kazakh: беташар; "bet" – face, "ashu" – to open) – the custom (often done at the wedding) to lift a veil from the face of a bride. Today it is the mullah who is invited to perform an improvised song, in which he mentions relatives of the groom. During his performance, a bride has to bow every time she hears a name. After the song, the mother of the groom lifts the veil.

Shildehana (Kazakh: шілдехана) – celebration of a birth of a child.

Suinshi (Kazakh: сүйінші) – a tradition to give present to someone who has brought good news.

=== Music ===
One of the most commonly used traditional musical instruments of the Kazakhs is the dombra, a plucked lute with two strings. It is often used to accompany solo or group singing. Another popular instrument is kobyz, a bow instrument played on the knees. Along with other instruments, both instruments play a key role in the traditional Kazakh orchestra. A notable composer is Kurmangazy, who lived in the 19th century. After studying in Moscow, Gaziza Zhubanova became the first woman classical composer in Kazakhstan, whose compositions reflect Kazakh history and folklore. A notable singer of the Soviet epoch is Roza Rymbaeva, she was a star of the trans-Soviet-Union scale. A notable Kazakh rock band is Urker, performing in the genre of ethno-rock, which synthesises rock music with the traditional Kazakh music.

== Clan structure ==
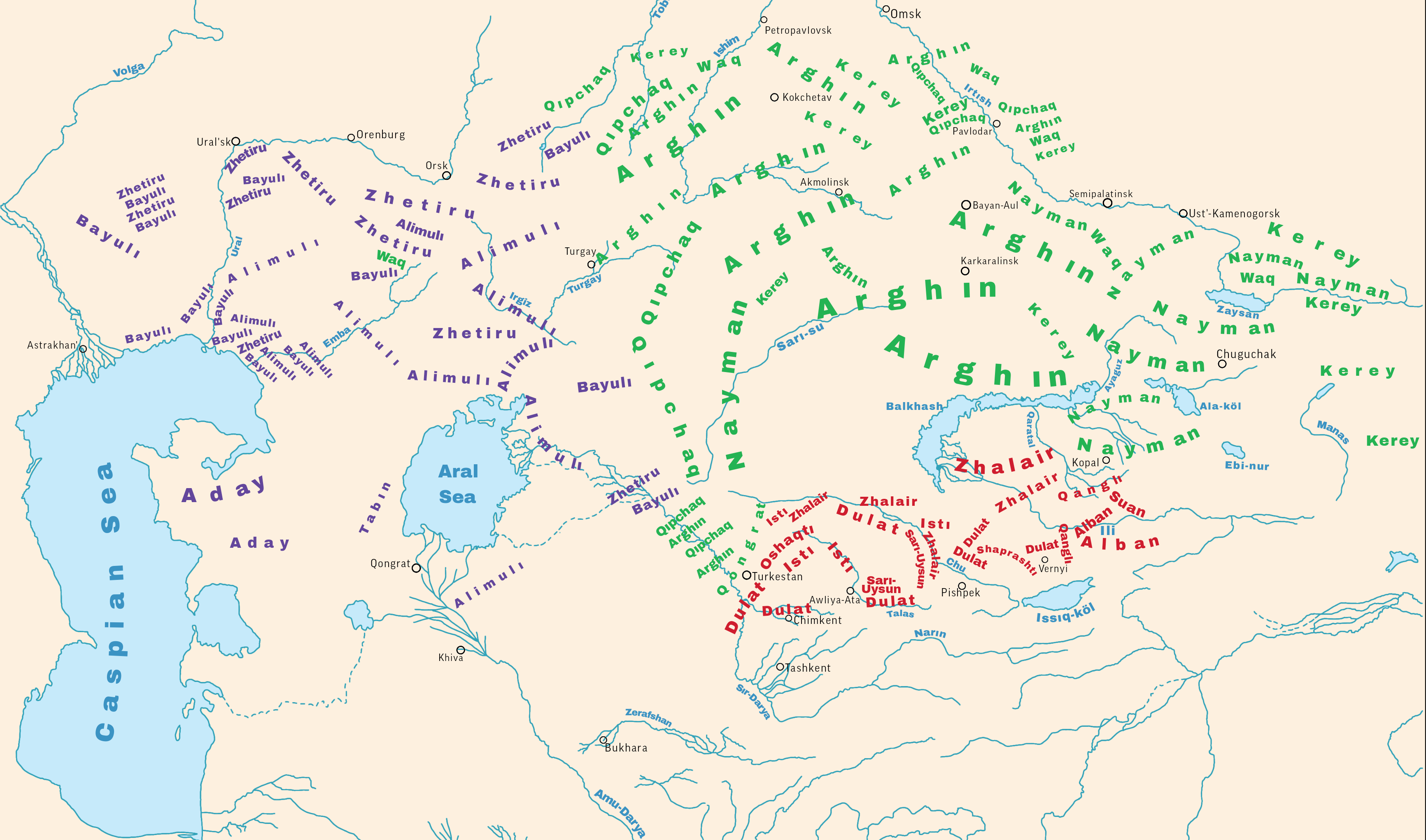
Map of the settlement of Kazakh tribes in the early 20th century Senior zhuz Middle zhuz Junior zhuz

Despite processes of globalization and the transition to a sedentary lifestyle, the clan and tribal structure of the Kazakh people has been preserved, and many modern Kazakhs know their tribal affiliation and the history of their lineage. According to Soviet-Kazakh historian Nurbulat Masanov, under the norms of customary law, every Kazakh in the past was expected to know their ancestors going back forty generations, or at least seven generations (see Jeti ata). This was a consequence of the traditional Kazakh worldview, which, due to the specific ways of transmitting information (as something sacred and intended only for "one's own people") and inheriting property (from father to son, from son to grandson, and so on), formed a clan-based identification of a person's social space. However, zhuzes and clans in Kazakhstan were never functioning organizational structures.

In general, knowledge of one's clan and tribal affiliation was an important part of Kazakh tradition. According to Christopher Atwood, until 1919 the leaders of the Kazakh liberal-nationalist Alash Orda movement proudly traced their ancestry either to Genghis Khan or to the Argyn clan of the Blue Horde. Kazakh society was historically organized on a hierarchical patrilineal system of genealogical lineages. Individuals belonging to the same lineage consider themselves descendants of a common ancestor, and several lineages are combined into clans, which in turn form tribes. Membership in a clan is determined through the paternal line and is passed from father to son. In contrast to the sedentary agricultural peoples of Central Asia, Kazakhs traditionally practiced exogamy: a marriage partner had to originate from a different clan, and after marriage and women integrate into the clan of their husband. According to oral genealogies, Kazakh tribes are considered the descendants of the emirs of the Golden Horde, who, according to the genealogy (shezhire), are regarded as their ancestors.

Traditional Kazakh society was divided into three zhuzes—the Greater, Middle, and Small. According to this complex and highly branched system, each zhuz was subdivided into tribal confederations, which in turn were divided into smaller clans and sub-clans down to the level of the individual. According to customary law, every Kazakh was expected to know his ancestors up to the fortieth generation. Rules governing exogamy, property rights, levirate customs (under which a widow was, in certain circumstances, expected to marry her deceased husband's brother), and many other social norms were based on the degree of genealogical kinship. The zhuz and clan groupings of Kazakhstan were never fully developed organizational structures comparable to those found in medieval states or clan-based societies elsewhere. Rather, they functioned as a system of social identification and a means of interpreting social relations through the lens of kinship and common descent.

Twelve tribes of the Senior zhuz primarily inhabited southern and southeastern Kazakhstan, seven tribes of the Middle zhuz lived in eastern, northern, and central Kazakhstan, while three tribes of the Junior zhuz traditionally occupied western Kazakhstan. Some steppe Kazakh clans were not part of the zhuzes, in particular representatives of the clergy (Kozha and Sunak) and the aristocracy (Tore). Members of the Kozha and Sunak clans trace their origins to Islamic missionaries descended through the paternal line from relatives of the Islamic prophet Muhammad. Members of the Tore clan are considered direct descendants of Genghis Khan.

According to Canadian historian Joo-Yup Lee, modern Kazakhs are composed of:

- Tribes of Mongol origin: Dulat, Manghuts, Konyrats, Uysun and others.
- Tribes of non-Mongol or Mongol or Turkic origin, but from the Mongolian steppes: Jalayir, Kerei, Naimans and others.
- Indigenous Turkic tribes from the Kipchak steppes: Kipchak, Kangly and others.
- Newly formed or emerging tribes of the Mongol Empire: Argyn and others.

A genetic study published in Nature in 2021 revealed that the western Kazakh tribal groups, which belong to the Alshyn alliance (Alimuly, Baiuly), share common patrilineal roots. Three independent lines of analysis demonstrated that these groups have a common ancestor who lived approximately 650 years ago, believed to be Emir Alau according to the shezhire. Today, the population of the Alshyn tribe exceeds 2 million people. The study further indicated that about 1.5 million western Kazakhs carry the Y-chromosome haplogroup C2a1a2-M48, Y15552, which supports the genealogy linking them to the common ancestor Emir Alau, who lived about 650 years ago. This also supports traditional views on their patrilineal ancestry and genealogy.

Another study published in the Russian journal Vestnik Moskovskogo Universiteta that a large proportion of the Argyn tribe from the Middle Zhuz carries the haplogroup G1-M285 (67%), with the cluster's age estimated at around 600 ± 200 years. The high frequency of haplogroup G1 across all genealogical lines of the Argyn tribe suggests a common biological ancestor. The expansion of this haplogroup in the Kazakh gene pool dates back to the interval between 470 and 750 years ago, coinciding with the time of the Golden Horde emir Kara-Khodja, as described in historical sources. Further expansion of G1 may have been driven by social prestige. A comprehensive analysis of genealogy and the gene pool suggests that the main ancestor of the Argyns (carriers of haplogroup G1) was the Golden Horde emir Kara-Khodja (14th century) or his immediate ancestors.

Some scholars have suggested that certain Kazakh tribes of the Senior Zhuz originate from Moghulistan, and that the Usun and Kipchak tribal unions formed the basis for the Senior Zhuz and Middle Zhuz, respectively, while the Junior Zhuz traces its roots to the Nogai tribes that joined the Kazakh Khanate. However, such theories were formulated without considering the data from shezhire (genealogical records) and modern genetic studies of polymorphisms.

According to shezhire data and genetic research, the Kazakh Uysun (including the Dulat clan within them) are not related to the Mughals or the Mughal Dulat, nor to the Western Turkic Dulu tribal union. Analysis of the shezhire shows that the Dulat within the Uysun belong to a common C2 haplogroup cluster, and their genealogy is genetically confirmed, tracing back to Maiky-biy, who lived in the 13th century in the Ulus of Jochi.

Studies indicate that Kazakhs as an ethnic group do not descend directly from the population of the Ulus of Orda Khan or Moghulistan; possible genetic overlaps are more likely explained by genetic drift. Kazakh clans have diverse paternal origins, but a common feature is that most of their progenitors date back to the period of the Golden Horde, when they served as emirs and karachi-beks under the Golden Horde khans.

In modern Kazakhstan, tribalism is fading away in business and government life. However, it is still common for Kazakhs to ask each other about the tribe they belong to when they become acquainted. It is more of a tradition than a necessity now, and there is no hostility between tribes. Kazakhs, regardless of their tribal origin, consider themselves one nation.

=== Three Kazakh hordes ===
Modern-day Kazakhs who still remember their tribes know that their tribes belong to one of the three jüz, a term roughly translatable as "horde" or "hundred":

- The Senior Horde (also called Elder or Great) (Ūly jüz)
- The Middle (also called Central) (Orta jüz)
- The Junior (also called Younger or Lesser) (Kışı jüz)

==== History of the Hordes ====
After the death of Tauke Khan in 1715/1718, the Kazakh Khanate was divided into independent Khanates (Hordes).

There is much debate surrounding the origins of the Hordes. Their age in extant historical texts is unknown, with the earliest mentions in the 17th century. The Turkologist Velyaminov-Zernov believed that it was the capture of the important cities of Tashkent, Yasi, and Sayram in 1598 by Tevvekel (Tauekel/Tavakkul) Khan that separated the Qazaqs, as they possessed the cities for only part of the 17th century. The theory suggests that the Qazaqs then divided among a wider territory after expanding from Zhetysu into most of the Dasht-i Qipchaq, with a focus on the trade available through the cities of the middle Syr Darya, to which Sayram and Yasi belonged. The Junior juz originated from the Nogais of the Nogai Horde.

SENIOR ZHUZ:

- Alban
- Zhalayir
- Dulat
- Oshakty
- Sary-Uysun
- Sirgeli
- Suan
- Shanyshkyly
- Kangly
- Shaksham
- Shapyrashty
- Ysty

MIDDLE ZHUZ:

- Argyn
- Kerei
- Qonyrat
- Qypshaq
- Naiman
- Uaq
- Tarakty

JUNIOR ZHUZ:

- Alimuly
- Shekty
- Shomekei
- Tortkara
- Kete
- Karakesek
- Karasakal
- Baiuly
- Adai
- Baibakty
- Bersh
- Taz
- Sherkesh
- Maskar
- Tana
- Kyzylkurt
- Altyn
- Zhappas
- Ysyk
- Esentemir
- Alasha
- Zhetiru
- Tabyn
- Zhagalbayly
- Kereit
- Tama
- Teleu
- Kerderi
- Ramadan

== See also ==
- Ethnic demography of Kazakhstan
- Kazakh diaspora

== Sources ==
- Atwood, Christopher P. (2004). Encyclopedia of Mongolia and the Mongol Empire (PDF). New York: Facts on File. ISBN 978-0-8160-4671-3.
- Favereau, Marie (20 April 2021). The Horde: How the Mongols Changed the World. Harvard University Press. ISBN 978-0-674-24421-4.
- Kaziev, S. Sh. (2014). Кыргызы: дискурсы этногенеза и этнической истории [The Kyrgyz: Discourses on Ethnogenesis and Ethnic History]. In M. N. Guboglo (ed.). Тюркские народы. Фрагменты этнических историй [Turkic Peoples: Fragments of Ethnic Histories] (PDF) (in Russian). Moscow: IEA RAS. ISBN 978-5-4211-0123-9.
- Lee, Joo-Yup (2023). The Turkic Peoples in World History. New York: Routledge. doi:10.4324/9781003256496. ISBN 978-1-003-25649-6.
- Lee, Joo-Yup (2019). "The Kazakh Khanate". In Ludden, David (ed.). The Oxford Research Encyclopedia of Asian History. New York: Oxford University Press. doi:10.1093/acrefore/9780190277727.013.60. ISBN 978-0-19-027772-7.
- Lee, Joo-Yup (April 2019). "Turkic Identity in Mongol and post-Mongol Central Asia and the Qipchaq Steppe.". In Ludden, David (ed.). The Oxford Research Encyclopedia of Asian History. New York: Oxford University Press. doi:10.1093/acrefore/9780190277727.013.443. ISBN 978-0-19-785173-9.
- Lee, Joo-Yup (2017). "The Political Vagabondage of the Chinggisid and Timurid Contenders to the Throne and Others in Post-Mongol Central Asia and the Qipchaq Steppe: A Comprehensive Study of Qazaqlïq, or the Qazaq Way of Life". Central Asiatic Journal. 60 (1–2): 60–95. doi:10.13173/centasiaj.60.1-2.0059.
- Malikov, Yuriy (2005). "The Kenesary Kasymov Rebellion (1837–1847): A National-Liberation Movement or "a Protest of Restoration"?". Nationalities Papers. 33 (4): 569–597. doi:10.1080/00905990500354137. ISSN 0090-5992.
- Erofeeva, Irina (2021). ""Kind" or "Saint" Jani Beg Khan (1342–1357) in the Oral Historical Memory of Kazakh Nomads". Golden Horde Review (in Russian) (1): 165.
- Sultanov, Tursun (2006). Genghis Khan and the Chinggisids: Fate and Power (in Russian). Saint Petersburg: Eurasia. p. 446. ISBN 5-9713-1680-X.
- Suleimenov, Ramazan; Moiseev, Vladimir (1988). From the History of Kazakhstan in the 18th Century (on the External and Internal Policy of Ablai) (in Russian). Alma-Ata: Nauka; Institute of History, Archaeology and Ethnography named after Ch. Ch. Valikhanov, Academy of Sciences of the Kazakh SSR.
- Uskenbay, Kanat (2016). "The Left Wing of the Ulus of Jochi in the 13th – Early 15th Centuries". The Golden Horde in World History (PDF). Tataria Magna (in Russian). Kazan: Sh. Marjani Institute of History of the Tatarstan Academy of Sciences; Center for Golden Horde and Tatar Khanates Studies named after M.A. Usmanov; University of Oxford. pp. 208–216.
- Kadyrbaev, Alexander (2009). "Kok Horde". History of the Tatars from Ancient Times, Ulus of Jochi (Golden Horde): 12th — Mid-15th Century (PDF). Vol. 3. Kazan: Sh. Marjani Institute of History of the Tatarstan Academy of Sciences. pp. 236–239.
- Kushkumbaev, Aibolat (2001). The Military Affairs of the Kazakhs in the 17th–18th Centuries (in Russian). Almaty: Daik-Press.
- Pochekaev, Roman (2017). Золотая Орда. История в имперском контексте [The Golden Horde: History in an Imperial Context]. Popular Science Literature (in Russian). St. Petersburg: Nauka. p. 206. ISBN 978-5-02-039675-3.
- Lee, Joo-Yup (2022). Sabitov, Zhaksylyk (ed.). Qazaqliq and the Formations of the Qazaqs: State and Identity in Post-Mongol Central Eurasia (in Russian). Translated by Mukanova, Z. Almaty: Shon Publishing House. p. 276. ISBN 978-601-211-431-7.
