= Daryino =

Daryino (Russian: Дарьино) is the name of several localities in Russia:

- Daryino, Aurgazinsky District, Republic of Bashkortostan
- Daryino, Gafuriysky District, Republic of Bashkortostan
- Daryino, Meleuzovsky District, Republic of Bashkortostan
- Daryino, Vladimir Oblast
