= Jalil Keyekbaev =

Bashkir linguist and Turkologist

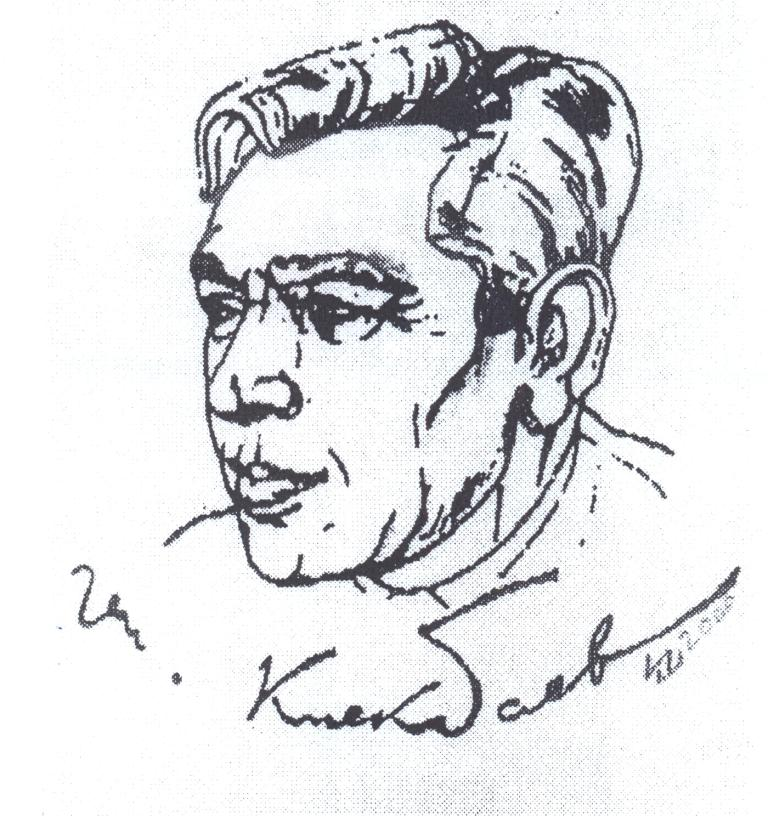
- Born: October 25, 1911; Karan-Yelga, Ufa Governorate, Russian Empire
- Died: March 19, 1968 (aged 56); Ufa, Bashkortostan, USSR
- Awards: Order of Lenin (1967); Order Badge of Honor (1961)

Academic background
- Education: Moscow State Linguistic University

Academic work
- Discipline: Linguist
- Sub-discipline: Turkology
- Institutions: Bashkir State University (Ufa)

Jalil Giniyatovich Keyekbaev (Bashkir: Keyekbayev Zhaelil Giniaet uly; October 25, 1911, Karan-Yelga, Gafuriysky District, Republic of Bashkortostan, Russian Empire – March 19, 1968, Ufa, Soviet Union) was a Bashkir linguist, Turkologist, doctor of philological sciences (1960), professor (1961), writer and member of the Bashkir Autonomous Soviet Socialist Republic Writers' Union. He is the founder of Bashkir linguistics and of the modern Bashkir school of Ural–Altaic languages.

He received awards for Excellence in Public Education of the RSFSR (1967) and an Honored Worker of Science of the BASSR (1961).

== Biography ==
Jalil Keyekbaev was born in 1911 to a peasant family in the village of Karan-Yelga in the Ufa Governorate. His father, Giniyatulla, graduated from the madrasah (school) in the village of Utyakovo, where he was taught by one of the best educators in the region, Khabibnazar Utyaki (The uncle of Zeki Velidi Togan, the founder of the Republic of Bashkortostan). Keyekbaev's mother was Garifa (daughter of Murzakai).

He studied at Makarovskaya Secondary School in the village of Makarovo. From 1929 to 1932 he studied at the pedagogical college in Ufa. During these years, he began to print his poems under the pseudonym Zhalil Tabyn (using the name of his tribe).

He graduated from the Faculty of Germanic Philology of the First Moscow State Pedagogical Institute of Foreign Languages (1937), then worked as a German teacher for one year at Roshalsky secondary school in the Moscow Region. In 1938, he began working at the Ufa Institute of Foreign Languages. During World War II, he temporarily left for his native district due to the need to accommodate evacuated teachers in the city of Ufa. In 1942, he served as director of the Saitbabinskaya secondary school of the Gafuri District.

He taught foreign languages in various secondary schools and higher educational institutions of the republic. Since 1943 to 1944, he was the chief editor of a Bashkir book publishing house. Since 1944 to 1953, he worked at the Ufa Aviation Institute (until 1946 and after 1948, he was head of the Department of Foreign Languages). In 1948, he defended his Ph.D. thesis on the topic "Orthoepy of the Bashkir literary language" at Moscow State University. He then worked at Temiryazev Bashkir Pedagogical Institute (now Bashkir State University), where he was employed as a senior lecturer and later dean of the faculty of foreign languages.

His scientific views were largely shaped by his dissertation advisor, Turkologist and orientalist Nikolai Dmitriev.

From 1951 to 1968 he headed the Department of Bashkir Linguistics at Temiryazev Bashkir Pedagogical Institute. From 1957 to 1961 he was Vice-Rector for Academic Affairs. In 1960, he defended his doctoral dissertation, "Phonetics of the Bashkir language (experience of descriptive and comparative historical research)". In 1961 he was awarded the title of professor, in 1967, he earned the title of Honored Scientist of the Bashkir Autonomous Soviet Socialist Republic.

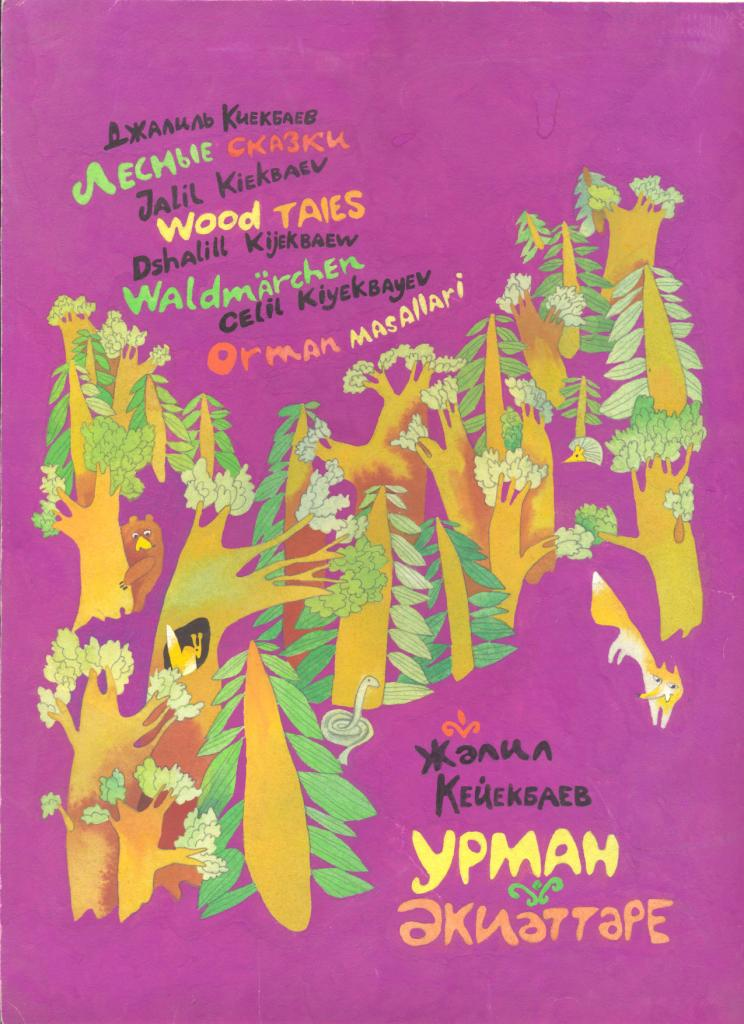
Cover of the book Wood Tales

Keyekbayev came to literature in the 1930s. Along with writing his own poetry, he translated from German into Bashkir the works of Goethe, Heinrich Heine, Erich Weinert, Willi Bredel, Friedrich Wolf (Keyekbaev was his translator in Ufa in 1936), and the Brothers Grimm. During World War II he wrote cubiars, essays, and stories on patriotic themes. He is the author of a book for children in the Bashkir language Urman әkiәttәre (1954; in the Russian translation of "Wood Tales", 1956), and translated the tales of Jacob Grimm (1940; Nemes halyk әkiәttәre) and Hungarian folk tales (1963; Vengr halyk әkiәttәre; co-authored).

He performed Bashkir folk songs and played the piano, mandolin, and quray.

== Scientific work ==
Keyekbaev used a new approach to studying the phonetics, morphology, lexicology and lexis of the Bashkir language. He is the founder of modern Bashkir linguistics, and author of many textbooks.

Keyekbaev for the first time in Turkology substantiated the phoneme as a unit that serves not only for the formation of words and morphemes, but also for distinguishing their meanings. The ability of a phoneme to differentiate words is its social function. In 1966, he published a fundamental work, "Vocabulary and Phraseology of the Modern Bashkir Literary Language". The monograph pays particular attention to lexical borrowings from Russian, Arabic, Persian and other languages.

In 1966, he published a textbook on the Bashkir language for students of the correspondence department of the philological faculty of Bashkir State University, which describes in detail the grammatical categories of the nominal parts of speech and verbs. Keyekbaev's monograph "Fundamentals of the Historical Grammar of the Ural-Altai Languages" (which received positive reviews from Nikolai Baskakov, Mirfatyh Zakiev and Boris Serebrennikov) was published posthumously in 1996; it bases a comparative examination of languages on the category of certainty and uncertainty.

Keyekbaev was the first to create a historical Bashkir grammar. In his monograph, Introduction to Ural-Altai Languages (1972), he was the first to show the genetic affinity of Uralic and Altaic.

Keyekbaev made a significant contribution to the training of scientific and pedagogical staff. More than ten candidate's and doctoral theses were defended under his guidance.

== Memorials ==
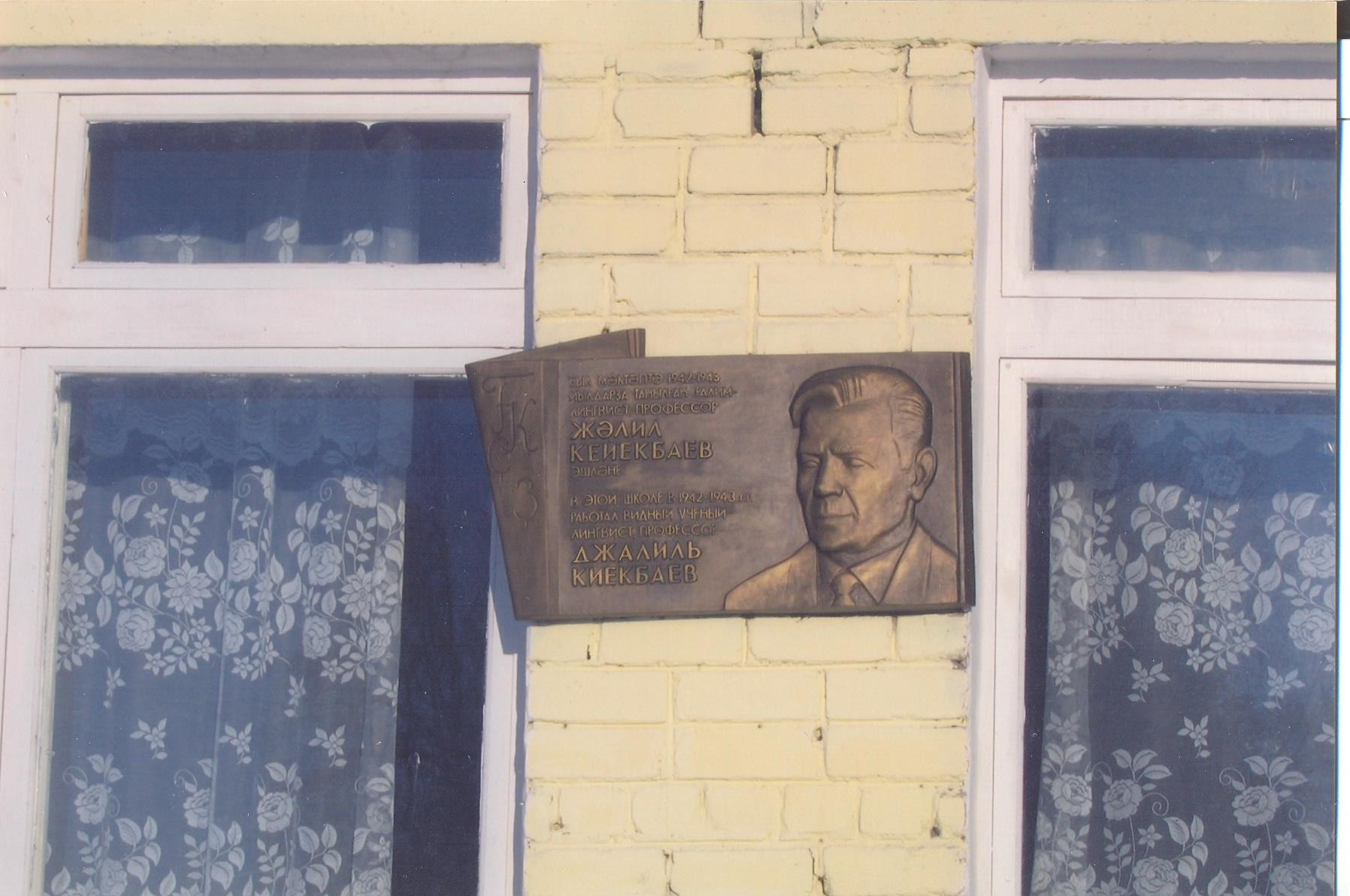
Plaque commemorating Кeyekbaev

- In 1991, in the Gafuri region of the Republic of Bashkortostan, the annual Jalil Keyekbaev Prize was established.
- Streets in Ufa and the village of Krasnousolsky in the Gafuri region are named after Keyekbaev.
- A museum and a memorial office to Keyekbaev were opened at Bashkir State University, and a scholarship was instituted in his name (1997).
- In Ufa, a memorial plaque was installed on the house where Keyekbaev lived.
- Karan-Yelga in the Gafuri region of the Republic of Bashkortostan has opened the house-museum of the professor.
- Every five years, international scientific conferences dedicated to Keyekbaev are held at Bashkir State University.
- A competition has been announced to create a monument to Keyekbaev.

== Awards ==
- Order of Lenin (1967)
- Order of the Badge of Honour (1961)
- "Honored worker of science of the Bashkir ASSR"

== Main works ==
- "Bashkir literary pronunciation" (1954)
- "Questions of the Bashkir toponymy" (1956)
- Synharmonism in borrowings from Arabic and Persian languages. Teacher of Bashkiria (magazine). 1957 No. 7, pp. 24–28
- "Bashkir dialects and a brief introduction to their history" (1958)
- Phonetics of the Bashkir language (the experience of descriptive and comparative historical research). Ufa, 1958 (in Bashkir)
- Vocabulary and phraseology of the modern Bashkir language. Ufa, 1966 (in Bashkir)
- About the origin of some case forms in the Ural-Altai languages in the light of the theory of definiteness-uncertainty // Questions of the methodology and methodology of linguistic research. Ufa. 1966, p. 175-180
- Introduction to the Ural-Altai linguistics. Ufa, 1972
- Fundamentals of historical grammar of the Ural-Altai languages. Ufa, 1996
- Selected articles. Ufa, 2002

=== Works of art ===
- Relatives and acquaintances: Roman. Ufa: Bashk. books. Publishing House, 1991, 352 p. (Bashkir) ISBN 5-295-00691-3
- Keyekbaev J. G. K 36 Urman әkiәtttәre: bashkort, rus, ingliz, german, tөrөk teldәrendә. - Өfө: Kitap, 2011. 264 bits. ISBN 978-5-295-05202-6 (WOOD TALES, WALDMÄRCHEN, ORMAN MASALLARI in Bashkir, Russian, English, German, Turkish

== Literature ==
- Zakiev М. Z. Дәртле йыр. Өфө, 1974;
- Suleymanov A..М. Халыҡ ижадынан һут алып: Жәлил Кейекбаевтың «Туғандар һәм таныштар» романында фольклор башланғыстары. Өфө, 2000
- Professor Jalil Giniyatovich Keyekbaev and his contribution to the development of the Ural-Altai and Turkic philology: materials of the Intern. scientific-practical conf. Ufa, 2011.
- Scientist and writer Jalil Giniyatovich Keyekbaev. Bibliography. Ufa BashSU, 2011. ISBN 978-5-9613-0167-0.
- Милибанд С. Д. Востоковеды России, XX — начало XXI века: Биобиблиографический словарь: В 2-х книгах. — М.: Восточная литература, 2008. — 968 с. + 1004 с. + 70 с. (доп. и указ., 2009).

== Links ==
- Books in the Bashkir language

other sources

- Keyekbaev Jalil. Scientific publishing house "Bashkir encyclopedia". -Ufa ISBN 978-5-88185-143-9
- Aznabaev A.M. О научных достижениях профессора Дж. Г. Киекбаева (к 105-летию со дня рождения)
- Zaynullin M.V. Outstanding Bashkir scientist and Turkologist (on the 100th anniversary of Professor J. G. Keyekbaev)
- Библиография и ссылки по тюркологии
- Ссылки на сайты о тюркологии
- Кононов А. Н. Тюркология // Лингвистический энциклопедический словарь, М., 1990
