= Igenchelyar, Gafuriysky District, Republic of Bashkortostan =

Igenchelyar Игенчеляр
- Village
- Location within Bashkortostan Location within Russia
- Coordinates: 53°45′N 56°22′E
- Country: Russia
- Region: Bashkortostan
- District: Gafuriysky District
- Time zone: UTC+5:00

Igenchelyar (Russian: Игенчеляр; Bashkir: Игенселәр, İgenselär) is a rural locality (a village) in Utyakovsky Selsoviet, Gafuriysky District, Bashkortostan, Russia. The population was 107 as of 2010. There are 3 streets.

== Geography ==
Igenchelyar is located 18 km southwest of Krasnousolsky (the district's administrative centre) by road. Tugayevo is the nearest rural locality.
