= Yurmash =

Yurmash Юрмаш
- Village
- Location within Bashkortostan Location within Russia
- Coordinates: 54°10′N 56°44′E
- Country: Russia
- Region: Bashkortostan
- District: Gafuriysky District
- Time zone: UTC+5:00

Yurmash (Russian: Юрмаш; Bashkir: Юрмаш, Yurmaş) is a rural locality (a village) in Imendyashevsky Selsoviet, Gafuriysky District, Bashkortostan, Russia. The population was 175 as of 2010. There are 2 streets.

== Geography ==
Yurmash is located 54 km northeast of Krasnousolsky (the district's administrative centre) by road. Aktashevo is the nearest rural locality.
