= Yulukovo =

Yulukovo Юлуково
- Selo
- Location within Bashkortostan Location within Russia
- Coordinates: 54°13′N 56°39′E
- Country: Russia
- Region: Bashkortostan
- District: Gafuriysky District
- Time zone: UTC+5:00

Yulukovo (Russian: Юлуково; Bashkir: Юлыҡ, Yulıq) is a rural locality (a selo) in Kovardinsky Selsoviet, Gafuriysky District, Bashkortostan, Russia. The population was 741 as of 2010. There are 8 streets.

== Geography ==
Yulukovo is located 50 km northeast of Krasnousolsky (the district's administrative centre) by road. Sabayevo is the nearest rural locality.
