= Tsapalovka =

Tsapalovka Цапаловка
- Village
- Location within Bashkortostan Location within Russia
- Coordinates: 53°54′N 56°18′E
- Country: Russia
- Region: Bashkortostan
- District: Gafuriysky District
- Time zone: UTC+5:00

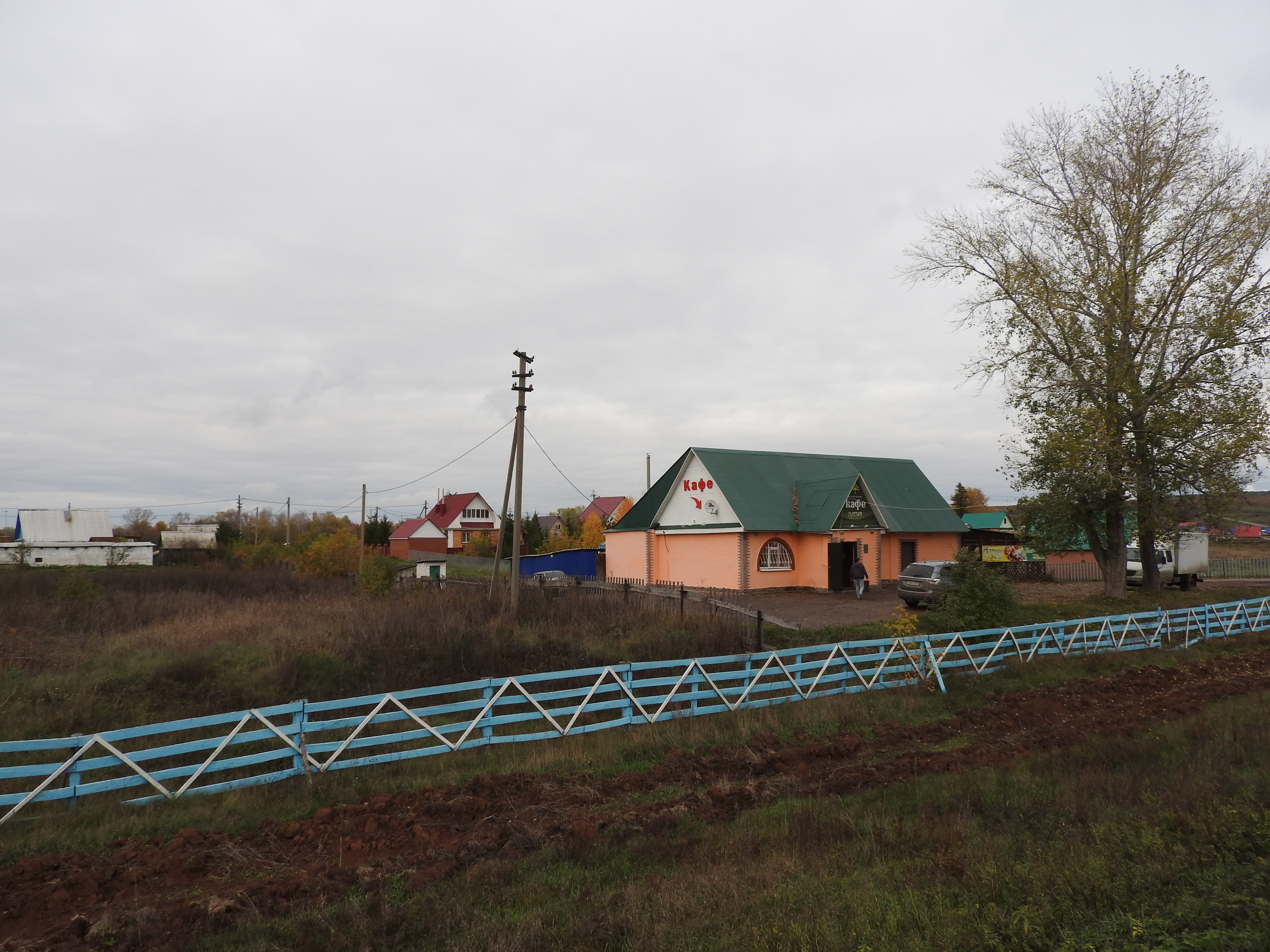
Building in Tsapalovka

Tsapalovka (Russian: Цапаловка) is a rural locality (a village) in Belsky Selsoviet, Gafuriysky District, Bashkortostan, Russia. The population was 29 as of 2010. There is 1 street.

== Geography ==
Tsapalovka is located 15 km west of Krasnousolsky (the district's administrative centre) by road. Inzelga is the nearest rural locality.
