= Zirikly, Gafuriysky District, Republic of Bashkortostan =

Zirikly Зириклы
- Village
- Location within Bashkortostan Location within Russia
- Coordinates: 54°05′N 57°02′E
- Country: Russia
- Region: Bashkortostan
- District: Gafuriysky District
- Time zone: UTC+5:00

Zirikly (Russian: Зириклы; Bashkir: Ерекле, Yerekle) is a rural locality (a village) in Tolparovsky Selsoviet, Gafuriysky District, Bashkortostan, Russia. The population was 29 as of 2010. There are 2 streets.

== Geography ==
Zirikly is located 62 km northeast of Krasnousolsky (the district's administrative centre) by road. Mendim is the nearest rural locality.
