= Krasnodubrovsk =

Krasnodubrovsk Краснодубровск
- Village
- Location within Bashkortostan Location within Russia
- Coordinates: 53°55′N 56°21′E
- Country: Russia
- Region: Bashkortostan
- District: Gafuriysky District
- Time zone: UTC+5:00

Krasnodubrovsk (Russian: Краснодубровск; Bashkir: Ҡыҙыл Дубровка, Qıźıl Dubrovka) is a rural locality (a village) in Belsky Selsoviet, Gafuriysky District, Bashkortostan, Russia. The population was 12 as of 2010. There is 1 street.

== Geography ==
Krasnodubrovsk is located 12 km northwest of Krasnousolsky (the district's administrative centre) by road. Rodina is the nearest rural locality.
