= Tash-Asty =

Tash-Asty Таш-Асты
- Village
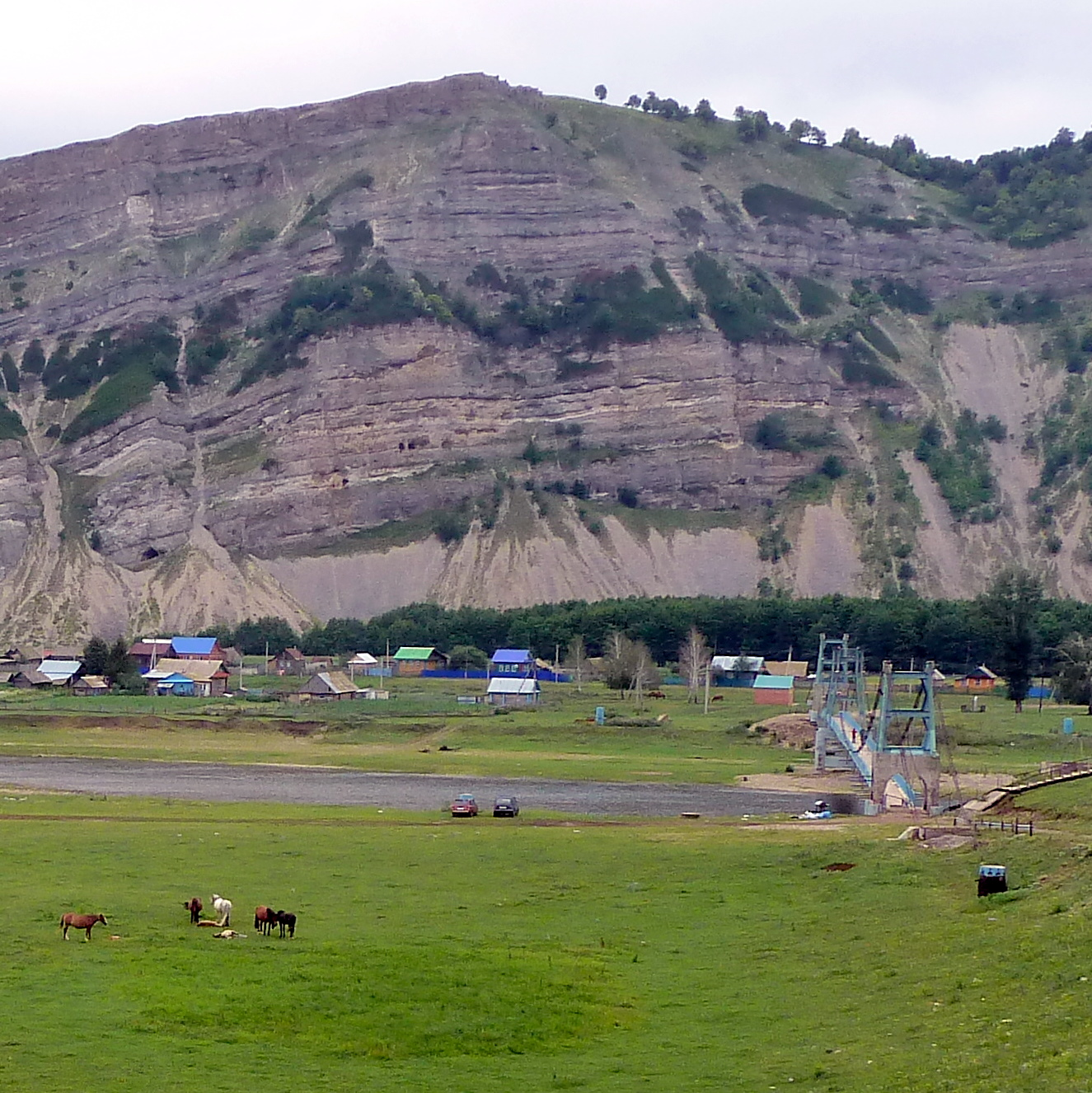
- Rock Uklykaya in the locality

- Location within Bashkortostan Location within Russia
- Coordinates: 54°08′N 56°46′E
- Country: Russia
- Region: Bashkortostan
- District: Gafuriysky District
- Time zone: UTC+5:00

Tash-Asty (Russian: Таш-Асты; Bashkir: Ташаҫты, Taşaśtı) is a rural locality (a village) in Imendyashevsky Selsoviet, Gafuriysky District, Bashkortostan, Russia. The population was 123 as of 2010. There is 1 street.

== Geography ==
Tash-Asty is located 56 km northeast of Krasnousolsky (the district's administrative centre) by road. Taishevo is the nearest rural locality.
