= Novyye Kovardy =

Novyye Kovardy Новые Коварды
- Village
- Location within Bashkortostan Location within Russia
- Coordinates: 54°11′N 56°40′E
- Country: Russia
- Region: Bashkortostan
- District: Gafuriysky District
- Time zone: UTC+5:00

Novyye Kovardy (Russian: Новые Коварды; Bashkir: Яңы Ҡауарҙы, Yañı Qawarźı) is a rural locality (Russian village) in Imendyashevsky Selsoviet, Gafuriysky District, Bashkortostan, Russia. The population was 14 as of 2010. There is only one street.

== Geography ==
Novyye Kovardy is located 52 km northeast of Krasnousolsky (the district's administrative centre) by road. Sabayevo is the nearest rural locality.
