= Bakrak =

Bakrak Бакрак
- Village
- Location within Bashkortostan Location within Russia
- Coordinates: 54°16′N 56°29′E
- Country: Russia
- Region: Bashkortostan
- District: Gafuriysky District
- Time zone: UTC+5:00

Bakrak (Russian: Бакрак; Bashkir: Баҡраҡ, Baqraq) is a rural locality (a village) in Zilim-Karanovsky Selsoviet, Gafuriysky District, Bashkortostan, Russia. The population was 124 as of 2010. There are 3 streets.

== Geography ==
Bakrak is located 51 km north of Krasnousolsky (the district's administrative centre) by road. Zilim-Karanovo is the nearest rural locality.
