= Saitbaba =

Saitbaba Саитбаба
- Selo
- Location within Bashkortostan Location within Russia
- Coordinates: 54°05′N 56°42′E
- Country: Russia
- Region: Bashkortostan
- District: Gafuriysky District
- Time zone: UTC+5:00

Saitbaba (Russian: Саитбаба; Bashkir: Сәйетбаба, Säyetbaba) is a rural locality (a selo) and the administrative centre of Saitbabinsky Selsoviet, Gafuriysky District, Bashkortostan, Russia. The population was 1,452 as of 2010. There are 21 streets.

== Geography ==
Saitbaba is located 36 km northeast of Krasnousolsky (the district's administrative centre) by road. Tugay is the nearest rural locality.
