= Tugay, Gafuriysky District, Republic of Bashkortostan =

Tugay Тугай
- Village
- Location within Bashkortostan Location within Russia
- Coordinates: 54°06′N 56°43′E
- Country: Russia
- Region: Bashkortostan
- District: Gafuriysky District
- Time zone: UTC+5:00

Tugay (Russian: Тугай; Bashkir: Туғай, Tuğay) is a rural locality (a village) in Saitbabinsky Selsoviet, Gafuriysky District, Bashkortostan, Russia. The population was 92 as of 2010. There is 1 street.

== Geography ==
Tugay is located 39 km northeast of Krasnousolsky (the district's administrative centre) by road. Saitbaba is the nearest rural locality.
