= Taishevo =

Taishevo Таишево
- Village
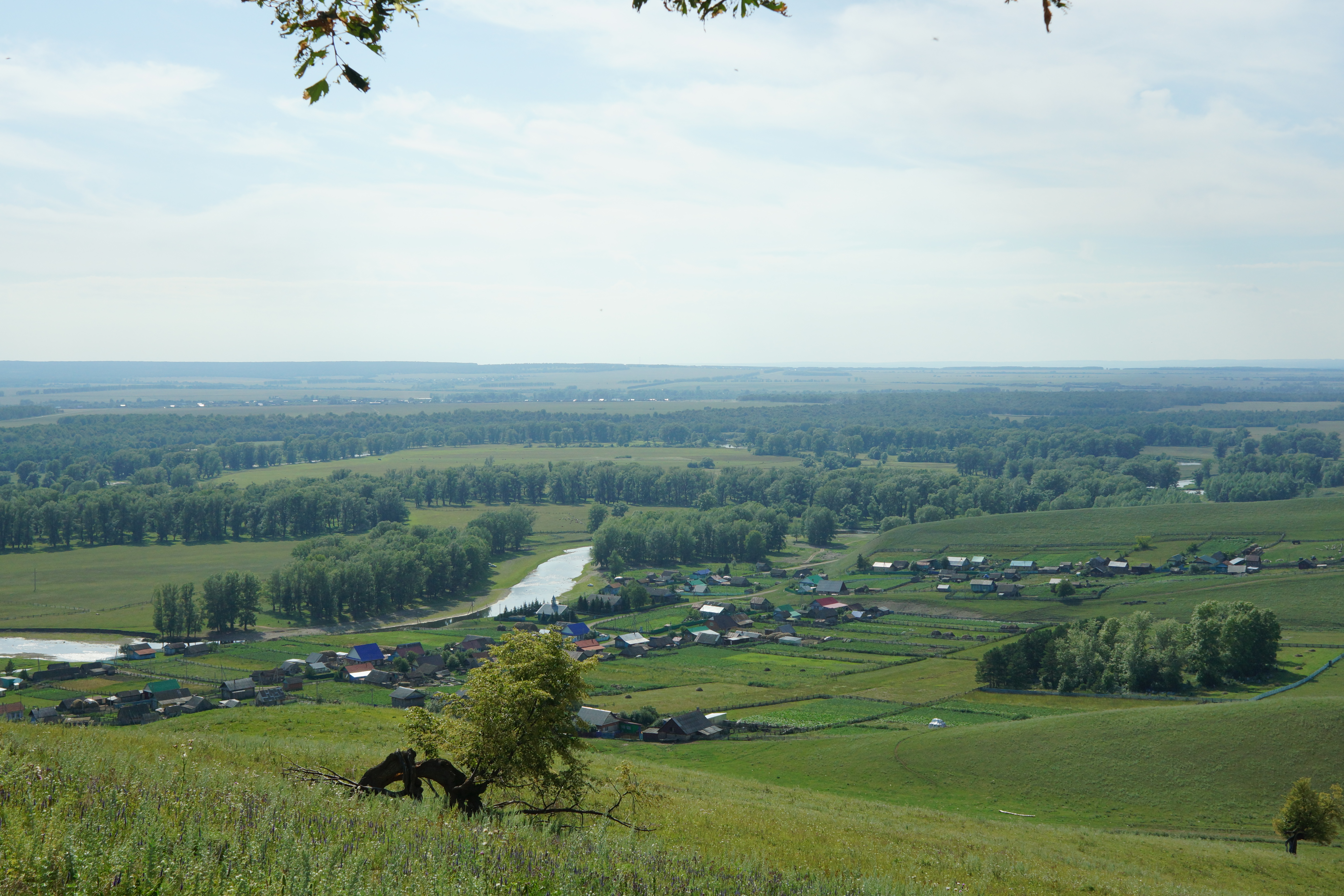
- View of the village

- Location within Bashkortostan Location within Russia
- Coordinates: 54°09′N 56°46′E
- Country: Russia
- Region: Bashkortostan
- District: Gafuriysky District
- Time zone: UTC+5:00

Taishevo (Russian: Таишево; Bashkir: Тайыш, Tayış) is a rural locality (a village) in Imendyashevsky Selsoviet, Gafuriysky District, Bashkortostan, Russia. The population was 176 as of 2010. It has four streets. The village is located on the banks of the Zilim River, approximately 55km northeast of Krasnousolsky.

According to the 2010 census, the population was 176 inhabitants, representing a decline. The population was 194 in 2002, and 212 in 2009.

== Geography ==
Taishevo is located 55 km northeast of Krasnousolsky (the district's administrative centre) by road. Tash-Asty is the nearest rural locality.
