= Kutluguza =

Kutluguza Кутлугуза
- Village
- Location within Bashkortostan Location within Russia
- Coordinates: 53°50′N 56°17′E
- Country: Russia
- Region: Bashkortostan
- District: Gafuriysky District
- Time zone: UTC+5:00

Kutluguza (Russian: Кутлугуза; Bashkir: Ҡотлоғужа, Qotloğuja) is a Russian village in Belsky Selsoviet, Gafuriysky District, Bashkortostan, Russia. The population was 314 as of 2010. There are nine streets.

== Geography ==
Kutluguza is located 22 km southwest of Krasnousolsky (the district's administrative centre) by road. Novokaramyshevo is the nearest rural locality.
