= Tugayevo, Gafuriysky District, Republic of Bashkortostan =

Tugayevo Тугаево
- Village
- Location within Bashkortostan Location within Russia
- Coordinates: 53°44′N 56°20′E
- Country: Russia
- Region: Bashkortostan
- District: Gafuriysky District
- Time zone: UTC+5:00

Tugayevo (Russian: Тугаево; Bashkir: Туғай, Tuğay) is a rural locality (a village) in Utyakovsky Selsoviet, Gafuriysky District, Bashkortostan, Russia. The population was 270 as of 2010. There are 9 streets.

== Geography ==
Tugayevo is located 21 km southwest of Krasnousolsky (the district's administrative centre) by road. Yangi-Yurt is the nearest rural locality.
