= Akhmetka =

Akhmetka Ахметка
- Village
- Location within Bashkortostan Location within Russia
- Coordinates: 54°02′N 56°23′E
- Country: Russia
- Region: Bashkortostan
- District: Gafuriysky District
- Time zone: UTC+5:00

Akhmetka (Russian: Ахметка; Bashkir: Әхмәт, Äxmät) is a rural locality (a village) in Tabynsky Selsoviet, Gafuriysky District, Bashkortostan, Russia. The population was 53 as of 2010. There are 2 streets.

== Geography ==
Akhmetka is located 22 km (14 mi) north of Krasnousolsky (the district's administrative centre) by road. Pavlovka is the nearest rural locality.
