= Verkhny Tashbukan =

Verkhny Tashbukan Верхний Ташбукан
- Village
- Location within Bashkortostan Location within Russia
- Coordinates: 53°45′N 56°35′E
- Country: Russia
- Region: Bashkortostan
- District: Gafuriysky District
- Time zone: UTC+5:00

Verkhny Tashbukan (Russian: Верхний Ташбукан; Bashkir: Үрге Ташбүкән, Ürge Taşbükän) is a rural locality (a village) in Tashbukanovsky Selsoviet, Gafuriysky District, Bashkortostan, Russia. The population was 55 as of 2010. There are 2 streets.

== Geography ==
Verkhny Tashbukan is located 23 km southeast of Krasnousolsky (the district's administrative centre) by road. Nizhny Tashbukan is the nearest rural locality.
