= Novotroyevka =

Novotroyevka Новотроевка
- Village
- Location within Bashkortostan Location within Russia
- Coordinates: 53°46′N 56°09′E
- Country: Russia
- Region: Bashkortostan
- District: Gafuriysky District
- Time zone: UTC+5:00

Novotroyevka (Russian: Новотроевка) is a rural locality (a village) in Mrakovsky Selsoviet, Gafuriysky District, Bashkortostan, Russia. The population was 32 as of 2010. There is 1 street.

== Geography ==
Novotroyevka is located 38 km southwest of Krasnousolsky (the district's administrative centre) by road. Mrakovo is the nearest rural locality.
