= Yakty-Kul, Gafuriysky District, Republic of Bashkortostan =

Yakty-Kul Якты-Куль
- Village
- Location within Bashkortostan Location within Russia
- Coordinates: 54°18′N 56°32′E
- Country: Russia
- Region: Bashkortostan
- District: Gafuriysky District
- Time zone: UTC+5:00

Yakty-Kul (Russian: Якты-Куль; Bashkir: Яҡтыкүл, Yaqtıkül) is a rural locality (a village) in Zilim-Karanovsky Selsoviet, Gafuriysky District, Bashkortostan, Russia. The population was 53 as of 2010. There is 1 street.

== Geography ==
Yakty-Kul is located 54 km north of Krasnousolsky (the district's administrative centre) by road. Andreyevka is the nearest rural locality.
