= Kurmantau =

Kurmantau Курмантау
- Selo
- Location within Bashkortostan Location within Russia
- Coordinates: 54°08′N 56°23′E
- Country: Russia
- Region: Bashkortostan
- District: Gafuriysky District
- Time zone: UTC+5:00

Kurmantau (Russian: Курмантау; Bashkir: Ҡормантау, Qormantaw) is a rural locality (a selo) in Burlinsky Selsoviet, Gafuriysky District, Bashkortostan, Russia. The population was 420 as of 2010. There are 8 streets.

== Geography ==
Kurmantau is located 36 km north of Krasnousolsky (the district's administrative centre) by road. Ust-Belishevo is the nearest rural locality.
