= Uzbyakovo =

Uzbyakovo Узбяково
- Village
- Location within Bashkortostan Location within Russia
- Coordinates: 54°11′N 56°28′E
- Country: Russia
- Region: Bashkortostan
- District: Gafuriysky District
- Time zone: UTC+5:00

Uzbyakovo (Russian: Узбяково; Bashkir: Үзбәк, Üzbäk) is a rural locality (a village) in Zilim-Karanovsky Selsoviet, Gafuriysky District, Bashkortostan, Russia. The population was 374 as of 2010. There are 5 streets.

== Geography ==
Uzbyakovo is located 46 km north of Krasnousolsky (the district's administrative centre) by road. Maly Utyash is the nearest rural locality.
