= Burunovka =

Burunovka Буруновка
- Selo
- Location within Bashkortostan Location within Russia
- Coordinates: 53°43′N 56°13′E
- Country: Russia
- Region: Bashkortostan
- District: Gafuriysky District

Area
  - Total: 1.38 km^{2} (0.53 sq mi)
- Elevation: 172 m (564 ft)
- Time zone: UTC+5:00
  - Summer (DST): UTC+6:00

Burunovka (Russian: Буруновка; Bashkir: Борон, Boron) is a rural locality (a selo) and the administrative centre of Burunovsky Selsoviet, Gafuriysky District, Bashkortostan, Russia. The population was 258 as of 2010. There are 2 streets.

== Geography ==
Burunovka is located 33 km southwest of Krasnousolsky (the district's administrative centre) by road. Petropavlovka is the nearest rural locality.
