= Kurgashla =

Kurgashla Кургашла
- Village
- Location within Bashkortostan Location within Russia
- Coordinates: 53°48′N 56°37′E
- Country: Russia
- Region: Bashkortostan
- District: Gafuriysky District
- Time zone: UTC+5:00

Kurgashla (Russian: Кургашла; Bashkir: Ҡурғашлы, Qurğaşlı) is a rural locality (a village) in Tashbukanovsky Selsoviet, Gafuriysky District, Bashkortostan, Russia. The population was 280 as of 2010. There are 13 streets.

== Geography ==
Kurgashla is located 16 km southeast of Krasnousolsky (the district's administrative centre) by road. Verkhny Tashbukan is the nearest rural locality.
