= Aktashevo =

Aktashevo Акташево
- Village
- Location within Bashkortostan Location within Russia
- Coordinates: 54°41′N 56°43′E
- Country: Russia
- Region: Bashkortostan
- District: Gafuriysky District
- Time zone: UTC+5:00

Aktashevo (Russian: Акташево; Bashkir: Аҡташ, Aqtaş) is a rural locality (a village) in Kovardinsky Selsoviet, Gafuriysky District, Bashkortostan, Russia. The population was 126 as of 2010. There are 3 streets.

== Geography ==
Aktashevo is located 59 km northeast of Krasnousolsky (the district's administrative centre) by road. Yurmash is the nearest rural locality.
