= Maly Utyash =

Maly Utyash Малый Утяш
- Village
- Location within Bashkortostan Location within Russia
- Coordinates: 54°12′N 56°28′E
- Country: Russia
- Region: Bashkortostan
- District: Gafuriysky District
- Time zone: UTC+5:00

Maly Utyash (Russian: Малый Утяш; Bashkir: Бәләкәй Үтәш, Bäläkäy Ütäş) is a rural locality (a village) in Zilim-Karanovsky Selsoviet, Gafuriysky District, Bashkortostan, Russia. The population was 122 as of 2010. There are 4 streets.

== Geography ==
Maly Utyash is located 46 km north of Krasnousolsky (the district's administrative centre) by road. Sredny Utyash is the nearest rural locality.
