= Yuzimanovo =

Rural locality in Saitbabinsky Selsoviet

Yuzimanovo Юзимяново
- Village
- Location within Bashkortostan Location within Russia
- Coordinates: 54°08′N 56°35′E
- Country: Russia
- Region: Bashkortostan
- District: Gafuriysky District
- Time zone: UTC+5:00

Yuzimanovo (Russian: Юзимяново; Bashkir: Йөҙимән, Yöźimän) is a rural locality (a village) in Saitbabinsky Selsoviet, Gafuriysky District, Bashkortostan, Russia. The population was 317 as of 2010. There are 4 streets.

== Geography ==
Yuzimanovo is located 43 km northeast of Krasnousolsky (the district's administrative centre) by road. Imyannik is the nearest rural locality.
