= Novaya Aldashla =

Novaya Aldashla Новая Альдашла
- Village
- Location within Bashkortostan Location within Russia
- Coordinates: 53°57′N 56°38′E
- Country: Russia
- Region: Bashkortostan
- District: Gafuriysky District
- Time zone: UTC+5:00

Novaya Aldashla (Russian: Новая Альдашла; Bashkir: Яңы Әлтәшле, Yañı Ältäşle) is a rural locality (a village) in Tashlinsky Selsoviet, Gafuriysky District, Bashkortostan, Russia. The population was 3 as of 2010. There are 2 streets.

== Geography ==
Novaya Aldashla is located 21 km northeast of Krasnousolsky (the district's administrative centre) by road. Novosemyonovka is the nearest rural locality.
