= Ibragimovo =

Ibragimovo Ибрагимово
- Village
- Location within Bashkortostan Location within Russia
- Coordinates: 54°14′N 56°36′E
- Country: Russia
- Region: Bashkortostan
- District: Gafuriysky District
- Time zone: UTC+5:00

Ibragimovo (Russian: Ибрагимово; Bashkir: Ибраһим, İbrahim) is a rural locality (a village) in Zilim-Karanovsky Selsoviet, Gafuriysky District, Bashkortostan, Russia. The population was 340 as of 2010. There are 7 streets.

== Geography ==
Ibragimovo is located 49 km north of Krasnousolsky (the district's administrative centre) by road. Yulukovo is the nearest rural locality.
