= Tabynskoye =

Tabynskoye Табынское
- Selo
- Location within Bashkortostan Location within Russia
- Coordinates: 53°58′N 56°23′E
- Country: Russia
- Region: Bashkortostan
- District: Gafuriysky District
- Time zone: UTC+5:00

Tabynskoye (Russian: Табынское; Bashkir: Табын, Tabın) is a rural locality (a selo) and the administrative centre of Tabynsky Selsoviet, Gafuriysky District, Bashkortostan, Russia. The population was 1,827 as of 2010. There are 29 streets.

== Geography ==
Tabynskoye is located 13 km northwest of Krasnousolsky (the district's administrative centre) by road. Kuzma-Alexandrovka is the nearest rural locality.
