= Imyannik =

Imyannik Имянник
- Village
- Location within Bashkortostan Location within Russia
- Coordinates: 54°08′N 56°36′E
- Country: Russia
- Region: Bashkortostan
- District: Gafuriysky District
- Time zone: UTC+5:00

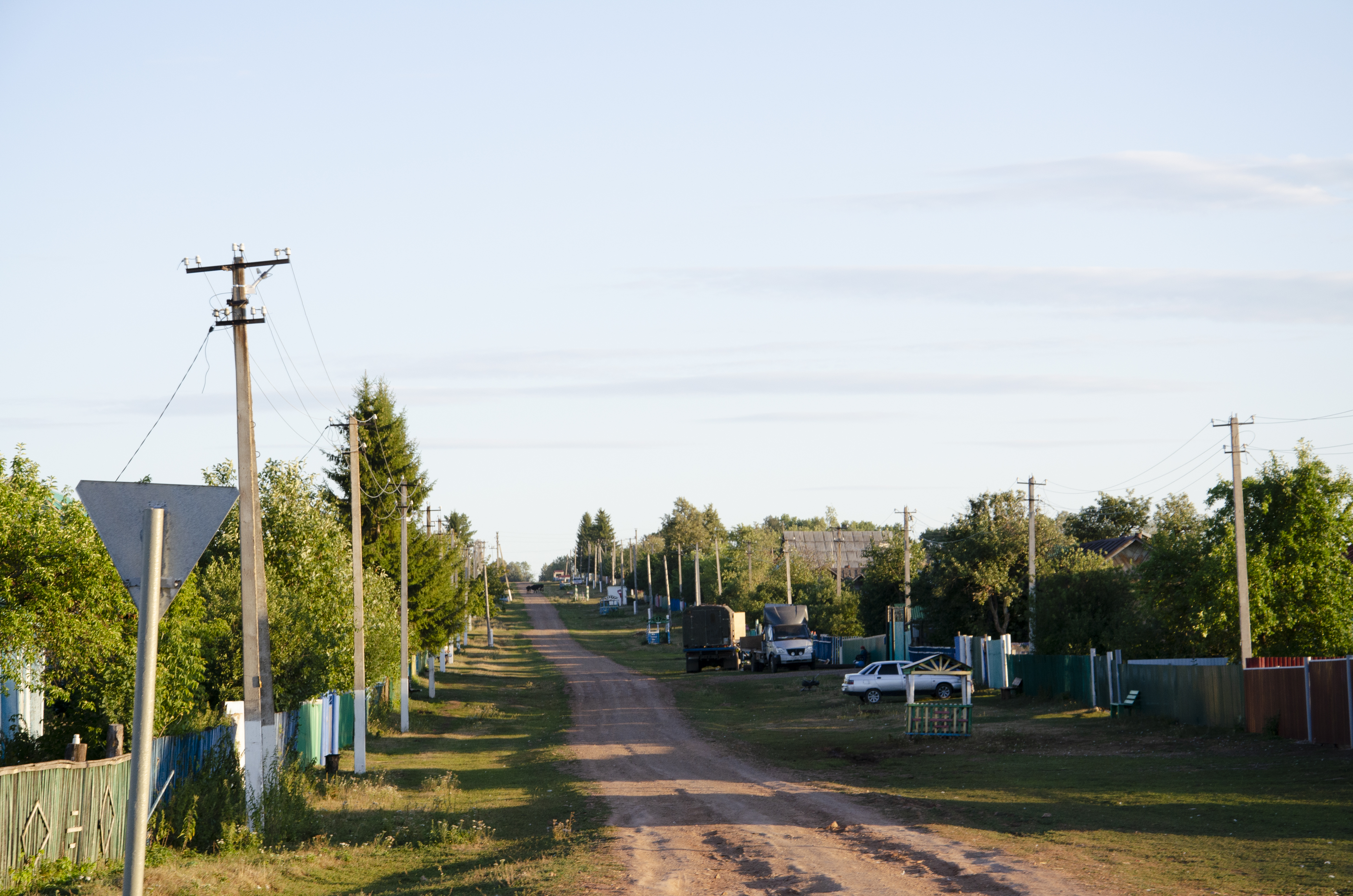

Imyannik (Russian: Имянник; Bashkir: Имәнлек, İmänlek) is a rural locality (a village) in Saitbabinsky Selsoviet, Gafuriysky District, Bashkortostan, Russia. The population was 98 as of 2010. There is 1 street.

== Geography ==
Imyannik is located 43 km north of Krasnousolsky (the district's administrative centre) by road. Yuzimyanovo is the nearest rural locality.
