= Kovardy =

Kovardy Коварды
- Selo
- Location within Bashkortostan Location within Russia
- Coordinates: 54°12′N 56°45′E
- Country: Russia
- Region: Bashkortostan
- District: Gafuriysky District
- Time zone: UTC+5:00

Kovardy (Russian: Коварды; Bashkir: Ҡауарҙы, Qawarźı) is a rural locality (a selo) and the administrative centre of Kovardinsky Selsoviet, Gafuriysky District, Bashkortostan, Russia. The population was 818 as of 2010. There are 9 streets.

== Geography ==
Kovardy is located 58 km northeast of Krasnousolsky (the district's administrative centre) by road. Aktashevo is the nearest rural locality.
