= Novozirikovo =

Novozirikovo Новозириково
- Village
- Location within Bashkortostan Location within Russia
- Coordinates: 54°11′N 56°32′E
- Country: Russia
- Region: Bashkortostan
- District: Gafuriysky District
- Time zone: UTC+5:00

Novozirikovo (Russian: Новозириково; Bashkir: Яңы Ерек, Yañı Yerek) is a rural locality (a village) in Zilim-Karanovsky Selsoviet, Gafuriysky District, Bashkortostan, Russia. The population was 101 as of 2010. There is 1 street.

== Geography ==
Novozirikovo is located 40 km north of Krasnousolsky (the district's administrative centre) by road. Zirikovo is the nearest rural locality.
