= Kurorta =

Kurorta Курорта
- Selo
- Location within Bashkortostan Location within Russia
- Coordinates: 53°55′N 56°31′E
- Country: Russia
- Region: Bashkortostan
- District: Gafuriysky District
- Time zone: UTC+5:00

Kurorta (Russian: Курорта) is a rural locality (a selo) in Gafuriysky District, Krasnoulsky Selsoviet, Bashkortostan, Russia. The population was 598 as of 2010. There are 6 streets.

== Geography ==
Kurorta is located 7 km northeast of Krasnousolsky (the district's administrative centre) by road. Krasnousolsky is the nearest rural locality.
