= Mendim =

Mendim Мендим
- Village
- Location within Bashkortostan Location within Russia
- Coordinates: 53°55′N 56°47′E
- Country: Russia
- Region: Bashkortostan
- District: Gafuriysky District
- Time zone: UTC+5:00

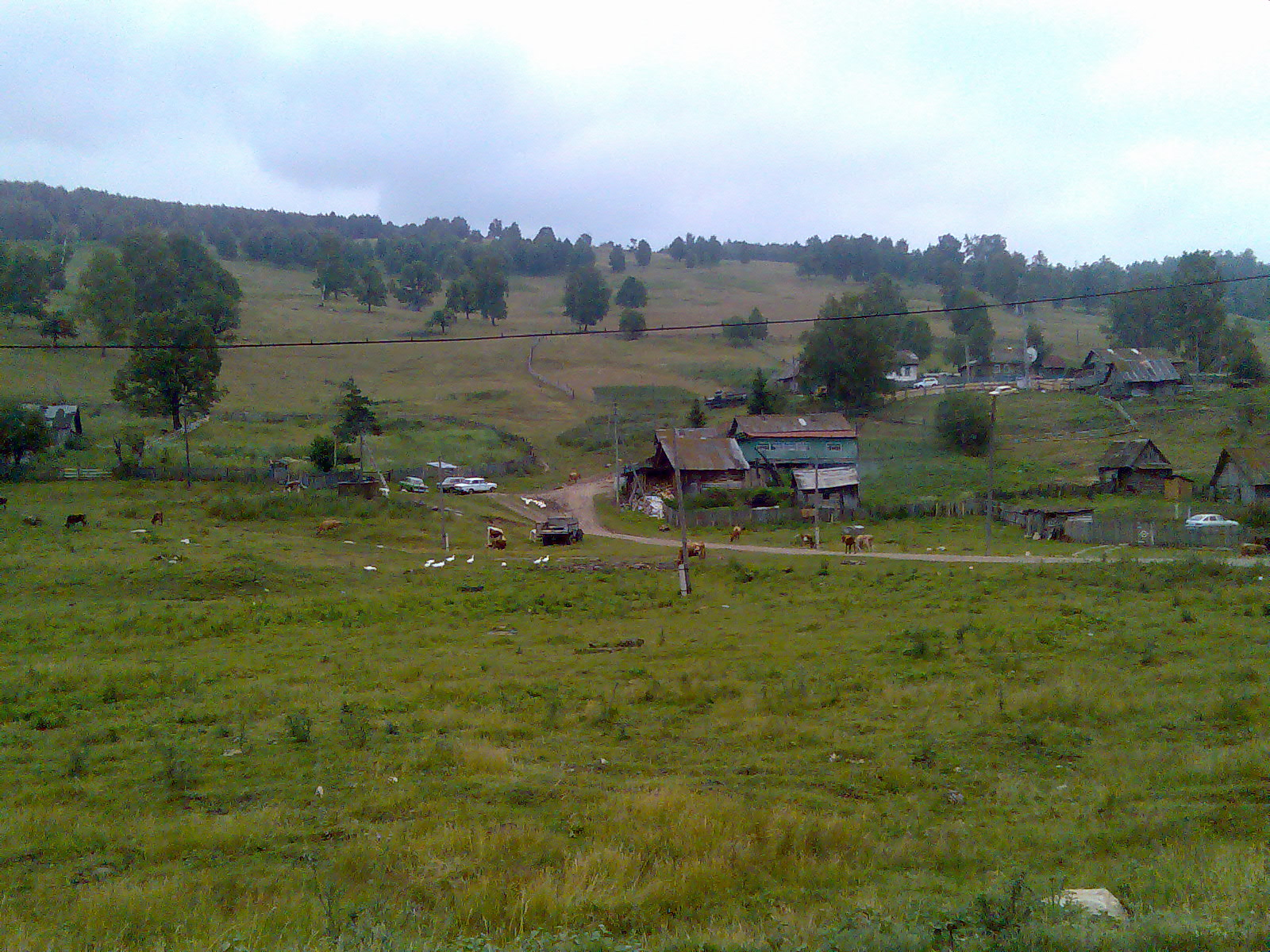
Mendim

Mendim (Russian: Мендим; Bashkir: Мәндем, Mändem) is a rural locality (a village) in Tashlinsky Selsoviet, Gafuriysky District, Bashkortostan, Russia. The population was 204 as of 2010. There are 4 streets.

== Geography ==
Mendim is located 26 km east of Krasnousolsky (the district's administrative centre) by road. Tashla is the nearest rural locality.
