= Novokaramyshevo =

Novokaramyshevo Новокарамышево
- Village
- Location within Bashkortostan Location within Russia
- Coordinates: 53°49′N 56°15′E
- Country: Russia
- Region: Bashkortostan
- District: Gafuriysky District
- Time zone: UTC+5:00

Novokaramyshevo (Russian: Новокарамышево; Bashkir: Яңы Ҡарамыш, Yañı Qaramış) is a rural locality (a village) in Belsky Selsoviet, Gafuriysky District, Bashkortostan, Russia. The population was 81 as of 2010. There are 3 streets.

== Geography ==
Novokaramyshevo is located 24 km southwest of Krasnousolsky (the district's administrative centre) by road. Kutluguza is the nearest rural locality.
