= Bely Kamen =

Bely Kamen Белый Камень
- Village
- Location within Bashkortostan Location within Russia
- Coordinates: 53°57′N 56°30′E
- Country: Russia
- Region: Bashkortostan
- District: Gafuriysky District
- Time zone: UTC+5:00

Bely Kamen (Russian: Белый Камень; Bashkir: Аҡ Таш, Aq Taş) is a rural locality (a village) in Krasnoulsky Selsoviet, Gafuriysky District, Bashkortostan, Russia. The population was 118 as of 2010. There are 4 streets.

== Geography ==
Bely Kamen is located 11 kilometres (6.8 mi) north of Krasnousolsky (the district's administrative centre) by road. Kurorta is the nearest rural locality.
