= Bolshoy Utyash =

Bolshoy Utyash Акташево
- Village
- Location within Bashkortostan Location within Russia
- Coordinates: 54°13′N 56°30′E
- Country: Russia
- Region: Bashkortostan
- District: Gafuriysky District
- Time zone: UTC+5:00

Bolshoy Utyash (Russian: Большой Утяш; Bashkir: Оло Үтәш, Olo Ütäş) is a rural locality (a village) in Zilim-Karanovsky Selsoviet, Gafuriysky District, Bashkortostan, Russia. The population was 172 as of 2010. There are 6 streets.

== Geography ==
Bolshoy Utyash is located 48 km north of Krasnousolsky (the district's administrative centre) by road. Zilim-Karanovo is the nearest rural locality.
