= Kyzyl Yar, Gafuriysky District, Republic of Bashkortostan =

Kyzyl Yar Кызыл Яр
- Village
- Location within Bashkortostan Location within Russia
- Coordinates: 54°16′N 56°35′E
- Country: Russia
- Region: Bashkortostan
- District: Gafuriysky District
- Time zone: UTC+5:00

Kyzyl Yar (Russian: Кызыл Яр; Bashkir: Ҡыҙылъяр, Qıźılyar) is a rural locality (a village) in Zilim-Karanovsky Selsoviet, Gafuriysky District, Bashkortostan, Russia. The population was 49 as of 2010. There are 2 streets.

== Geography ==
Kyzyl Yar is located 56 km north of Krasnousolsky (the district's administrative centre) by road. Abdullino is the nearest rural locality.
