= Novyye Burly =

Novyye Burly Новые Бурлы
- Village
- Location within Bashkortostan Location within Russia
- Coordinates: 54°05′N 56°31′E
- Country: Russia
- Region: Bashkortostan
- District: Gafuriysky District
- Time zone: UTC+5:00

Novyye Burly (Russian: Новые Бурлы; Bashkir: Яңы Бурлы, Yañı Burlı) is a rural locality (a village) in Tabynsky Selsoviet, Gafuriysky District, Bashkortostan, Russia. The population was 73 as of 2010. There are two streets.

== Geography ==
Novyye Burly is located 29 km north of Krasnousolsky (the district's administrative centre) by road. Beryozovka is the nearest rural locality.
