= Muraz, Republic of Bashkortostan =

Muraz Мураз
- Village
- Location within Bashkortostan Location within Russia
- Coordinates: 54°09′N 56°41′E
- Country: Russia
- Region: Bashkortostan
- District: Gafuriysky District
- Time zone: UTC+5:00

Muraz (Russian: Мураз; Bashkir: Мораҙ, Moraź) is a rural locality (a village) in Imendyashevsky Selsoviet, Gafuriysky District, Bashkortostan, Russia. The population was 124 as of 2010. There are 3 streets.

== Geography ==
Muraz is located 51 km northeast of Krasnousolsky (the district's administrative centre) by road. Karagayevo is the nearest rural locality.
