= Rodina, Gafuriysky District, Republic of Bashkortostan =

Rodina Родина
- Selo
- Location within Bashkortostan Location within Russia
- Coordinates: 53°56′N 56°23′E
- Country: Russia
- Region: Bashkortostan
- District: Gafuriysky District
- Time zone: UTC+5:00

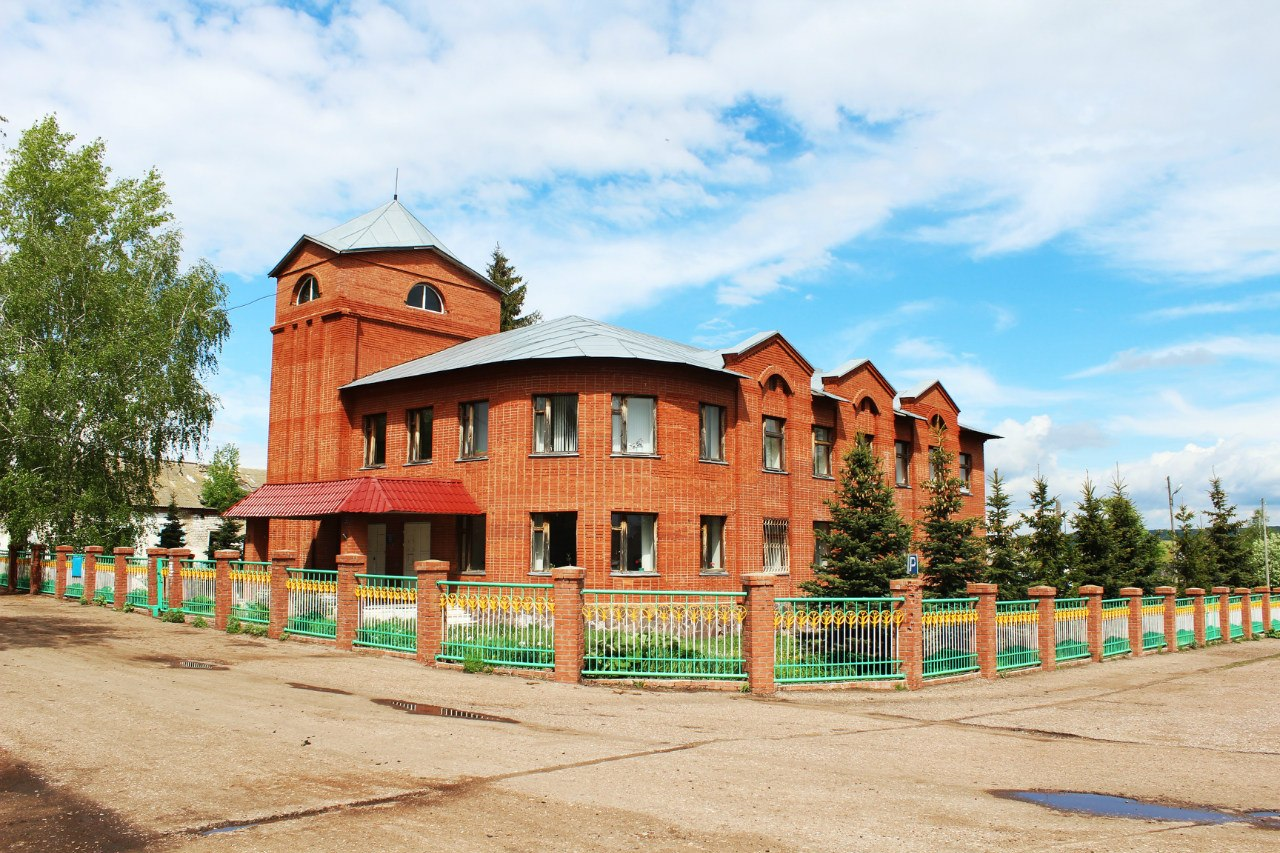
Building in Rodina

Rodina (Russian: Родина) is a rural locality (a selo) in Tabynsky Selsoviet, Gafuriysky District, Bashkortostan, Russia. The population was 703 as of 2010. There are 16 streets.

== Geography ==
Rodina is located 9 km northwest of Krasnousolsky (the district's administrative centre) by road. Krasnodubrovsk is the nearest rural locality.
