= Tatarsky Saskul =

Tatarsky Saskul Татарский Саскуль
- Village
- Location within Bashkortostan Location within Russia
- Coordinates: 53°56′N 56°16′E
- Country: Russia
- Region: Bashkortostan
- District: Gafuriysky District
- Time zone: UTC+5:00

Tatarsky Saskul (Russian: Татарский Саскуль; Bashkir: Татар Һаҫыҡкүле, Tatar Haśıqküle) is a rural locality (a village) in Beloozersky Selsoviet, Gafuriysky District, Bashkortostan, Russia. The population was 194 as of 2010. There are 6 streets.

== Geography ==
Tatarsky Saskul is located 29 km northwest of Krasnousolsky (the district's administrative centre) by road. Lugovaya is the nearest rural locality.
