= Voinovka =

Voinovka Воиновка
- Village
- Location within Bashkortostan Location within Russia
- Coordinates: 53°57′N 56°15′E
- Country: Russia
- Region: Bashkortostan
- District: Gafuriysky District
- Time zone: UTC+5:00

Voinovka (Russian: Воиновка) is a rural locality (a village) in Beloozersky Selsoviet, Gafuriysky District, Bashkortostan, Russia. The population was 108 as of 2010. There are 2 streets.

== Geography ==
Voinovka is located 27 km (16.8 mi) northwest of Krasnousolsky (the district's administrative centre) by road. Lugovaya is the nearest rural locality.
