= Karagayevo =

Karagayevo Карагаево
- Selo
- Location within Bashkortostan Location within Russia
- Coordinates: 54°08′N 56°42′E
- Country: Russia
- Region: Bashkortostan
- District: Gafuriysky District
- Time zone: UTC+5:00

Karagayevo (Russian: Карагаево; Bashkir: Ҡарағай, Qarağay) is a rural locality (a selo) and the administrative centre of Imendyashevsky Selsoviet, Gafuriysky District, Bashkortostan, Russia. The population was 297 as of 2010. There are 6 streets.

== Geography ==
Karagayevo is located 49 km northeast of Krasnousolsky (the district's administrative centre) by road. Nekrasovka is the nearest rural locality.
