= Novosemyonovka =

Novosemyonovka Новосемёновка
- Village
- Location within Bashkortostan Location within Russia
- Coordinates: 53°58′N 56°36′E
- Country: Russia
- Region: Bashkortostan
- District: Gafuriysky District
- Time zone: UTC+5:00

Novosemyonovka (Russian: Новосемёновка) is a rural locality (a village) in Tashlinsky Selsoviet, Gafuriysky District, Bashkortostan, Russia. The population was 14 as of 2010. There is 1 street.

== Geography ==
Novosemyonovka is located 23 km northeast of Krasnousolsky (the district's administrative centre) by road. Novaya Aldashla is the nearest rural locality.
