= Novotaishevo =

Village in Bashkortostan, Russia

Novotaishevo Новотаишево
- Village
- Location within Bashkortostan Location within Russia
- Coordinates: 54°10′N 56°40′E
- Country: Russia
- Region: Bashkortostan
- District: Gafuriysky District

Population (2010)
  - Total: 25
- Time zone: UTC+5:00

Novotaishevo (Russian: Новотаишево; Bashkir: Яңы Тайыш, Yañı Tayış) is a rural locality (a village) in Imendyashevsky Selsoviet, Gafuriysky District, Bashkortostan, Russia. The population was 25 as of 2010. There is 1 street.

== Geography ==
Novotaishevo is located 51 km northeast of Krasnousolsky (the district's administrative centre) by road. Novye Kovardy is the nearest rural locality.
