= Tolparovo =

Tolparovo Толпарово
- Village
- Location within Bashkortostan Location within Russia
- Coordinates: 54°01′N 57°06′E
- Country: Russia
- Region: Bashkortostan
- District: Gafuriysky District
- Time zone: UTC+5:00

Tolparovo (Russian: Толпарово; Bashkir: Талпар, Talpar) is a rural locality (a village) in Tolparovsky Selsoviet, Gafuriysky District, Bashkortostan, Russia. The population was 236 as of 2010. There are 7 streets.

== Geography ==
Tolparovo is located 57 km northeast of Krasnousolsky (the district's administrative centre) by road. Mendim is the nearest rural locality.
