= Krasny Oktyabr, Gafuriysky District, Republic of Bashkortostan =

Krasny Oktyabr Красный Октябрь
- Village
- Location within Bashkortostan Location within Russia
- Coordinates: 53°46′N 56°07′E
- Country: Russia
- Region: Bashkortostan
- District: Gafuriysky District
- Time zone: UTC+5:00

Krasny Oktyabr (Russian: Красный Октябрь; Bashkir: Ҡыҙыл Октябрь, Qıźıl Oktyabr) is a rural locality (a village) in Mrakovsky Selsoviet, Gafuriysky District, Bashkortostan, Russia. The population was 11 as of 2010. There is 1 street.

== Geography ==
Krasny Oktyabr is located 40 km southwest of Krasnousolsky (the district's administrative centre) by road. Kateninovsky is the nearest rural locality.

== Population ==
Year	County population
2002	4
2009	33
2010	11
