= Derevnya pchelosovkhoza =

Derevnya pchelosovkhoza Деревня пчелосовхоза
- Village
- Location within Bashkortostan Location within Russia
- Coordinates: 53°54′N 56°34′E
- Country: Russia
- Region: Bashkortostan
- District: Gafuriysky District
- Time zone: UTC+5:00

Derevnya pchelosovkhoza (Russian: Деревня пчелосовхоза; Bashkir: Умартасылыҡ совхозы, Umartasılıq sovxozı) is a rural locality (a village) in Krasnoulsky Selsoviet, Gafuriysky District, Bashkortostan, Russia. The population was 169 as of 2010. There are 7 streets.

== Geography ==
The village is located 24 km northeast of Krasnousolsky (the district's administrative centre) by road.
