= Yavgildy =

Yavgildy Явгильды
- Village
- Location within Bashkortostan Location within Russia
- Coordinates: 54°08′N 56°31′E
- Country: Russia
- Region: Bashkortostan
- District: Gafuriysky District
- Time zone: UTC+5:00

Yavgildy (Russian: Явгильды; Bashkir: Яугилде, Yawgilde) is a rural locality (a village) in Burlinsky Selsoviet, Gafuriysky District, Bashkortostan, Russia. The population was 226 as of 2010. There are 5 streets.

== Geography ==
Yavgildy is located 35 km north of Krasnousolsky (the district's administrative centre) by road. Zirikovo is the nearest rural locality.
