= Sabayevo, Gafuriysky District, Republic of Bashkortostan =

Sabayevo Сабаево
- Village
- Location within Bashkortostan Location within Russia
- Coordinates: 54°12′N 56°41′E
- Country: Russia
- Region: Bashkortostan
- District: Gafuriysky District
- Time zone: UTC+5:00

Sabayevo (Russian: Сабаево; Bashkir: Һабай, Habay) is a rural locality (a village) in Kovardinsky Selsoviet, Gafuriysky District, Bashkortostan, Russia. The population was 177 as of 2010. There are 4 streets.

== Geography ==
Sabayevo is located 54 km north of Krasnousolsky (the district's administrative centre) by road. Novye Kovardy is the nearest rural locality.
