= Sredny Utyash =

Sredny Utyash Средний Утяш
- Village
- Location within Bashkortostan Location within Russia
- Coordinates: 54°13′N 56°27′E
- Country: Russia
- Region: Bashkortostan
- District: Gafuriysky District
- Time zone: UTC+5:00

Sredny Utyash (Russian: Средний Утяш; Bashkir: Урта Үтәш, Urta Ütäş) is a rural locality (a village) in Zilim-Karanovsky Selsoviet, Gafuriysky District, Bashkortostan, Russia. The population was 56 as of 2010. There are 2 streets.

== Geography ==
Sredny Utyash is located 47 km north of Krasnousolsky (the district's administrative centre) by road. Maly Utyash is the nearest rural locality.
