= Nizhny Tashbukan =

Nizhny Tashbukan Нижний Ташбукан
- Selo
- Location within Bashkortostan Location within Russia
- Coordinates: 53°44′N 56°34′E
- Country: Russia
- Region: Bashkortostan
- District: Gafuriysky District
- Time zone: UTC+5:00

Nizhny Tashbukan (Russian: Нижний Ташбукан; Bashkir: Түбәнге Ташбүкән, Tübänge Taşbükän) is a rural locality (a selo) and the administrative centre of Tashbukanovsky Selsoviet, Gafuriysky District, Bashkortostan, Russia. The population was 166 as of 2010. There are 4 streets.

== Geography ==
Nizhny Tashbukan is located 26 km southeast of Krasnousolsky (the district's administrative centre) by road. Verkhny Tashbukan is the nearest rural locality.
