= Zilim-Karanovo =

Zilim-Karanovo Зилим-Караново
- Selo
- Location within Bashkortostan Location within Russia
- Coordinates: 54°13′N 56°33′E
- Country: Russia
- Region: Bashkortostan
- District: Gafuriysky District
- Time zone: UTC+5:00

Zilim-Karanovo (Russian: Зилим-Караново; Bashkir: Еҙем-Ҡаран, Yeźem-Qaran) is a rural locality (a selo) and the administrative centre of Zilim-Karanovsky Selsoviet, Gafuriysky District, Bashkortostan, Russia. The population was 431 as of 2010. There are 10 streets.

== Geography ==
Zilim-Karanovo is located 45 km north of Krasnousolsky (the district's administrative centre) by road. Bolshoy Utyash is the nearest rural locality.
