= Inzelga =

Inzelga Инзелга
- Selo
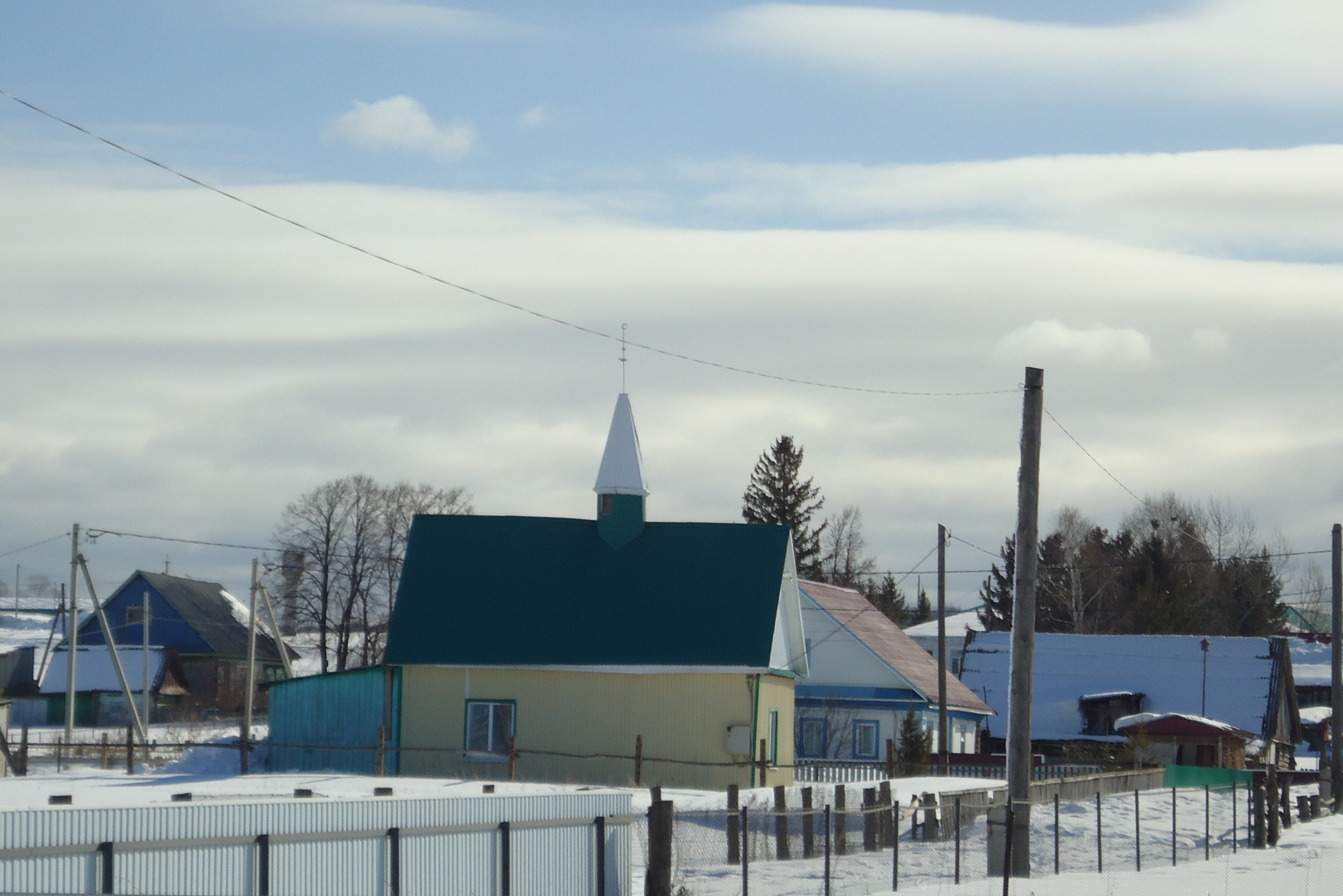

- Location within Bashkortostan Location within Russia
- Coordinates: 53°52′N 56°18′E
- Country: Russia
- Region: Bashkortostan
- District: Gafuriysky District
- Time zone: UTC+5:00

Inzelga (Russian: Инзелга; Bashkir: Игенйылға, İgenyılğa) is a rural locality (a selo) and the administrative centre of Belsky Selsoviet, Gafuriysky District, Bashkortostan, Russia. The population was 389 as of 2010. There are 3 streets.

== Geography ==
Inzelga is located 18 km west of Krasnousolsky (the district's administrative centre) by road. Tsapalovka is the nearest rural locality.
