= Beloozyorovka =

Beloozyorovka Белоозёровка
- Village
- Location within Bashkortostan Location within Russia
- Coordinates: 54°00′N 56°13′E
- Country: Russia
- Region: Bashkortostan
- District: Gafuriysky District
- Time zone: UTC+5:00

Beloozyorovka (Russian: Белоозёровка) is a rural locality (a village) in Beloozersky Selsoviet, Gafuriysky District, Bashkortostan, Russia. The population was 28 as of 2010. There is 1 street.

== Geography ==
Beloozyorovka is located 32 km northwest of Krasnousolsky (the district's administrative centre) by road. Beloye Ozero is the nearest rural locality.
