= Pobeda, Gafuriysky District, Republic of Bashkortostan =

Pobeda Победа
- Village
- Location within Bashkortostan Location within Russia
- Coordinates: 54°03′N 56°21′E
- Country: Russia
- Region: Bashkortostan
- District: Gafuriysky District
- Time zone: UTC+5:00

Pobeda (Russian: Победа) is a rural locality (a village) in Tabynsky Selsoviet, Gafuriysky District, Bashkortostan, Russia. The population was 4 as of 2010. There is 1 street.

== Geography ==
Pobeda is located 25 km north of Krasnousolsky (the district's administrative centre) by road. Geroyevka is the nearest rural locality.
