= Nekrasovka, Gafuriysky District, Republic of Bashkortostan =

Nekrasovka Некрасовка
- Village
- Location within Bashkortostan Location within Russia
- Coordinates: 54°08′N 56°40′E
- Country: Russia
- Region: Bashkortostan
- District: Gafuriysky District
- Time zone: UTC+5:00

Nekrasovka (Russian: Некрасовка) is a rural locality (a village) in Imendyashevsky Selsoviet, Gafuriysky District, Bashkortostan, Russia. The population was 52 as of 2010. There is 1 street.

== Geography ==
Nekrasovka is located 47 km northeast of Krasnousolsky (the district's administrative centre) by road. Karagayevo is the nearest rural locality.
