= Noyabrevka =

Noyabrevka Ноябревка
- Village
- Location within Bashkortostan Location within Russia
- Coordinates: 53°45′N 56°14′E
- Country: Russia
- Region: Bashkortostan
- District: Gafuriysky District
- Time zone: UTC+5:00

Noyabrevka (Russian: Ноябревка) is a rural locality (a village) in Yangiskainsky Selsoviet, Gafuriysky District, Bashkortostan, Russia. The population was 8 as of 2010. There is 1 street.

== Geography ==
Noyabrevka is located 29 km southwest of Krasnousolsky (the district's administrative centre) by road. Yangiskain is the nearest rural locality.
