= Kulkanovo =

Kulkanovo Кулканово
- Village
- Location within Bashkortostan Location within Russia
- Coordinates: 54°03′N 56°40′E
- Country: Russia
- Region: Bashkortostan
- District: Gafuriysky District
- Time zone: UTC+5:00

Kulkanovo (Russian: Кулканово; Bashkir: Ҡолҡан, Qolqan) is a rural locality (a village) in Saitbabinsky Selsoviet, Gafuriysky District, Bashkortostan, Russia. The population was 166 as of 2010. There are two streets.

== Geography ==
Kulkanovo is located 32 km northeast of Krasnousolsky (the district's administrative centre) by road. Saitbaba is the nearest rural locality.
