= Krasnousolsky =

Krasnousolsky (masculine), Krasnousolskaya (feminine), or Krasnousolskoye (neuter) may refer to:

- Krasnousolsky (rural locality), a rural locality (a selo) in Gafuriysky District of the Republic of Bashkortostan, Russia
- Krasnousolsky District, name of Gafuriysky District of the Republic of Bashkortostan, Russia in 1930–1940
