= Uvarovka, Gafuriysky District, Republic of Bashkortostan =

Uvarovka Уваровка
- Village
- Location within Bashkortostan Location within Russia
- Coordinates: 53°58′N 56°14′E
- Country: Russia
- Region: Bashkortostan
- District: Gafuriysky District
- Time zone: UTC+5:00

Uvarovka (Russian: Уваровка) is a rural locality (a village) in Beloozersky Selsoviet, Gafuriysky District, Bashkortostan, Russia. The population was 10 as of 2010. There is 1 street.

== Geography ==
Uvarovka is located 27 km northwest of Krasnousolsky (the district's administrative centre) by road. Daryino is the nearest rural locality.
