= Russky Saskul =

Russky Saskul Русский Саскуль
- Village
- Location within Bashkortostan Location within Russia
- Coordinates: 53°54′N 56°13′E
- Country: Russia
- Region: Bashkortostan
- District: Gafuriysky District
- Time zone: UTC+5:00

Russky Saskul (Russian: Русский Саскуль; Bashkir: Урыҫ Һаҫыҡкүле, Urıś Haśıqküle) is a rural locality (a village) in Beloozersky Selsoviet, Gafuriysky District, Bashkortostan, Russia. The population was 338 as of 2010. There are 9 streets.

== Geography ==
Russky Saskul is located 21 km west of Krasnousolsky (the district's administrative centre) by road. Tsapalovka is the nearest rural locality.
