= Zirikovo =

Zirikovo Зириково
- Village
- Location within Bashkortostan Location within Russia
- Coordinates: 54°09′N 56°32′E
- Country: Russia
- Region: Bashkortostan
- District: Gafuriysky District
- Time zone: UTC+5:00

Zirikovo (Russian: Зириково; Bashkir: Ерек, Yerek) is a rural locality (a village) in Burlinsky Selsoviet, Gafuriysky District, Bashkortostan, Russia. The population was 161 as of 2010. There are 4 streets.

== Geography ==
Zirikovo is located 38 km north of Krasnousolsky (the district's administrative centre) by road. Yavgildy is the nearest rural locality.
