= Usmanovo, Gafuriysky District, Republic of Bashkortostan =

Usmanovo Усманово
- Village
- Location within Bashkortostan Location within Russia
- Coordinates: 54°08′N 56°38′E
- Country: Russia
- Region: Bashkortostan
- District: Gafuriysky District
- Time zone: UTC+5:00

Usmanovo

Usmanovo (Russian: Усманово; Bashkir: Уҫман, Uśman) is a rural locality (a village) in Saitbabinsky Selsoviet, Gafuriysky District, Bashkortostan, Russia. The population was 246 as of 2010. There are seven streets.

== Geography ==
Usmanovo is located 47 km northeast of Krasnousolsky (the district's administrative centre) by road. Nekrasovka is the nearest rural locality.
