= Bazikovo =

Bazikovo Базиково
- Village
- Location within Bashkortostan Location within Russia
- Coordinates: 54°42′N 56°13′E
- Country: Russia
- Region: Bashkortostan
- District: Gafuriysky District
- Time zone: UTC+5:00

Bazikovo (Russian: Базиково; Bashkir: Баҙыҡ, Baźıq) is a rural locality (a village) in Burunovsky Selsoviet, Gafuriysky District, Bashkortostan, Russia. The population was 206 as of 2010. There are 6 streets.

== Geography ==
Bazikovo is located 35 km southwest of Krasnousolsky (the district's administrative centre) by road. Burunovka is the nearest rural locality.
