= Karan-Yelga =

Karan-Yelga Каран-Елга
- Village
- Location within Bashkortostan Location within Russia
- Coordinates: 54°04′N 56°44′E
- Country: Russia
- Region: Bashkortostan
- District: Gafuriysky District
- Time zone: UTC+5:00

Karan-Yelga (Russian: Каран-Елга; Bashkir: Ҡаранйылға, Qaranyılğa) is a rural locality (a village) in Saitbabinsky Selsoviet, Gafuriysky District, Bashkortostan, Russia. The population was 265 as of 2010. There are 8 streets.

== Geography ==
Karan-Yelga is located 39 km northeast of Krasnousolsky (the district's administrative centre) by road. Saitbaba is the nearest rural locality.
