= Utyakovo =

Utyakovo Утяково
- Selo
- Location within Bashkortostan Location within Russia
- Coordinates: 53°43′N 56°25′E
- Country: Russia
- Region: Bashkortostan
- District: Gafuriysky District
- Time zone: UTC+5:00

Utyakovo (Russian: Утяково; Bashkir: Үтәк, Ütäk) is a rural locality (a selo) and the administrative centre of Utyakovsky Selsoviet, Gafuriysky District, Bashkortostan, Russia. The population was 567 as of 2010. There are 12 streets.

== Geography ==
Utyakovo is located 23 km south of Krasnousolsky (the district's administrative centre) by road. Yangi-Yurt is the nearest rural locality.
