= Daryino, Gafuriysky District, Republic of Bashkortostan =

Daryino Дарьино
- Village
- Location within Bashkortostan Location within Russia
- Coordinates: 53°58′N 56°18′E
- Country: Russia
- Region: Bashkortostan
- District: Gafuriysky District
- Time zone: UTC+5:00

Daryino (Russian: Дарьино) is a rural locality (a village) in Beloozersky Selsoviet, Gafuriysky District, Bashkortostan, Russia. The population was 250 as of 2010. There are 2 streets.

== Geography ==
Daryino is located 29 km northwest of Krasnousolsky (the district's administrative centre) by road. Beloye Ozero is the nearest rural locality.
