= Gafuri =

Gafuri Гафури
- Selo
- Location within Bashkortostan Location within Russia
- Coordinates: 54°33′N 54°38′E
- Country: Russia
- Region: Bashkortostan
- District: Buzdyaksky District
- Time zone: UTC+5:00

Gafuri (Russian: Гафури; Bashkir: Ғафури, Ğafuri) is a rural locality (a selo) and the administrative centre of Gafuriysky Selsoviet, Buzdyaksky District, Bashkortostan, Russia. The population was 609 as of 2010. There are 11 streets.

== Geography ==
Gafuri is located 8 kilometers (5.0 mi) east of Buzdyak (the district's administrative centre) by road. Syrtlanovo is the nearest rural locality.
