= Daryino, Vladimir Oblast =

Daryino Дарьино
- Village
- Location within Vladimir Oblast Location within Russia
- Coordinates: 56°20′N 38°35′E
- Country: Russia
- Region: Vladimir Oblast
- District: Alexandrovsky District
- Time zone: UTC+3:00

Daryino (Russian: Дарьино) is a rural locality (a village) in Karinskoye Rural Settlement, Alexandrovsky District, Vladimir Oblast, Russia. The population was 24 as of 2010. There are 3 streets.

== Geography ==
Daryino is located 13 km southwest of Alexandrov (the district's administrative centre) by road. Bukhary is the nearest rural locality.
