= Makarovo, Ishimbaysky District, Republic of Bashkortostan =

Makarovo Макарово
- Selo
- Location within Bashkortostan Location within Russia
- Coordinates: 53°38′N 56°36′E
- Country: Russia
- Region: Bashkortostan
- District: Ishimbaysky District
- Time zone: UTC+5:00

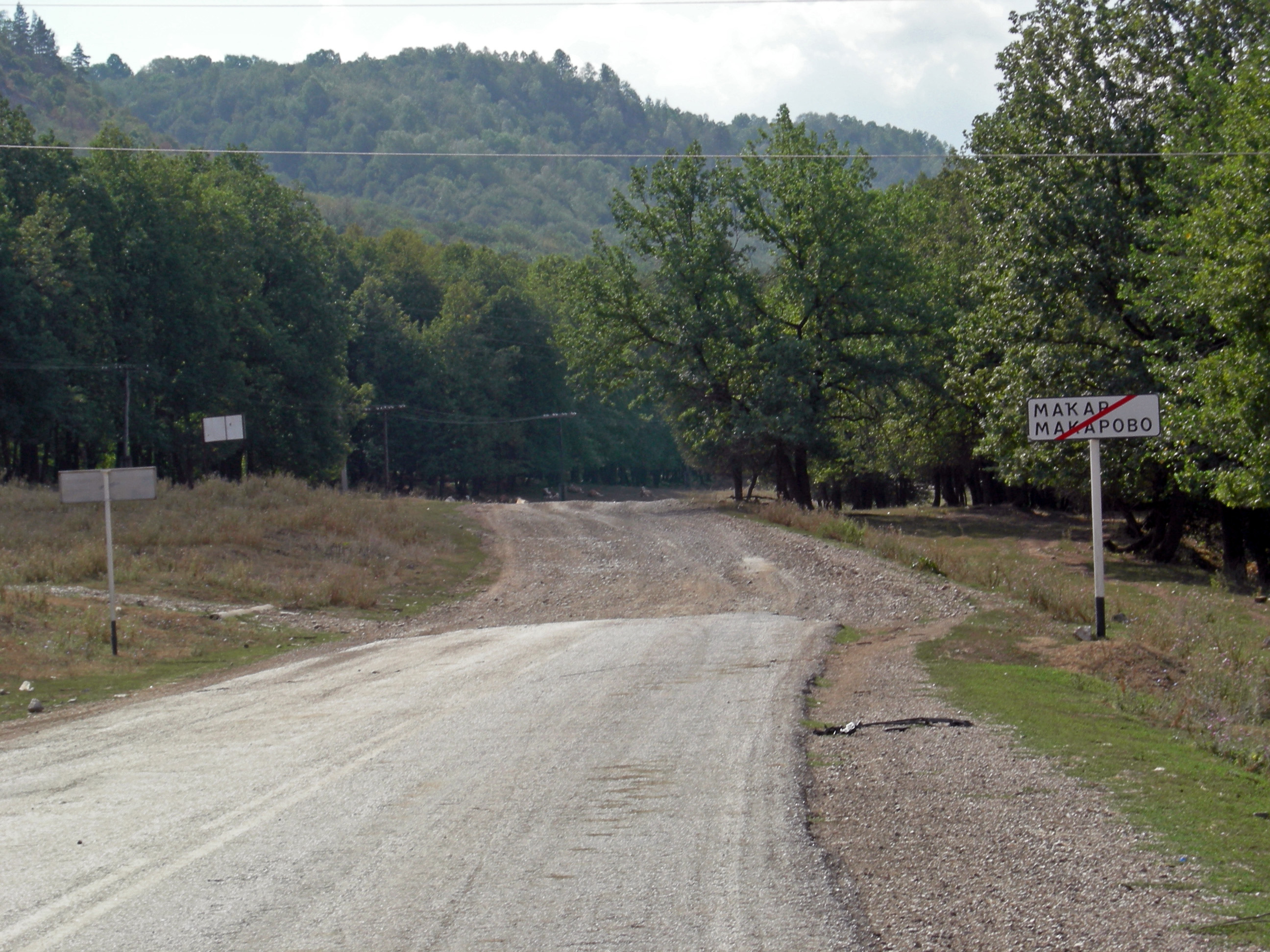
A road in Makarovo in 2012.

Makarovo (Russian: Мака́рово; Bashkir: Маҡар, Maqar) is a rural locality (a selo) and the administrative centre of Makarovsky Selsoviet, Ishimbaysky District, Bashkortostan, Russia. The population was 1,019 as of 2010. There are 12 streets.

== Geography ==
Makarovo is located 51 km northeast of Ishimbay (the district's administrative centre) by road. Ziganovka is the nearest rural locality.
