= Daryino, Aurgazinsky District, Republic of Bashkortostan =

Daryino Дарьино
- Village
- Location within Bashkortostan Location within Russia
- Coordinates: 53°57′N 56°13′E
- Country: Russia
- Region: Bashkortostan
- District: Aurgazinsky District
- Time zone: UTC+5:00

Daryino (Russian: Дарьино) is a rural locality (a village) in Chuvash-Karamalinsky Selsoviet, Aurgazinsky District, Bashkortostan, Russia. The population was 41 as of 2010. There is 1 street.

== Geography ==
Daryino is located 4 km north of Tolbazy (the district's administrative centre) by road.
