= Daryino, Meleuzovsky District, Republic of Bashkortostan =

Daryino Дарьино
- Selo
- Location within Bashkortostan Location within Russia
- Coordinates: 53°02′N 55°53′E
- Country: Russia
- Region: Bashkortostan
- District: Meleuzovsky District
- Time zone: UTC+5:00

Daryino (Russian: Дарьино) is a rural locality (a selo) and the administrative centre of Partizansky Selsoviet, Meleuzovsky District, Bashkortostan, Russia. The population was 801 as of 2010. There are 6 streets.

== Geography ==
Daryino is located 16 km north of Meleuz (the district's administrative centre) by road. Samarovka is the nearest rural locality.
