= Krasnousolsky (rural locality) =

Krasnousolsky Красноусольский
- Selo

Other transcription(s)
  - Bashkir: Красноусол
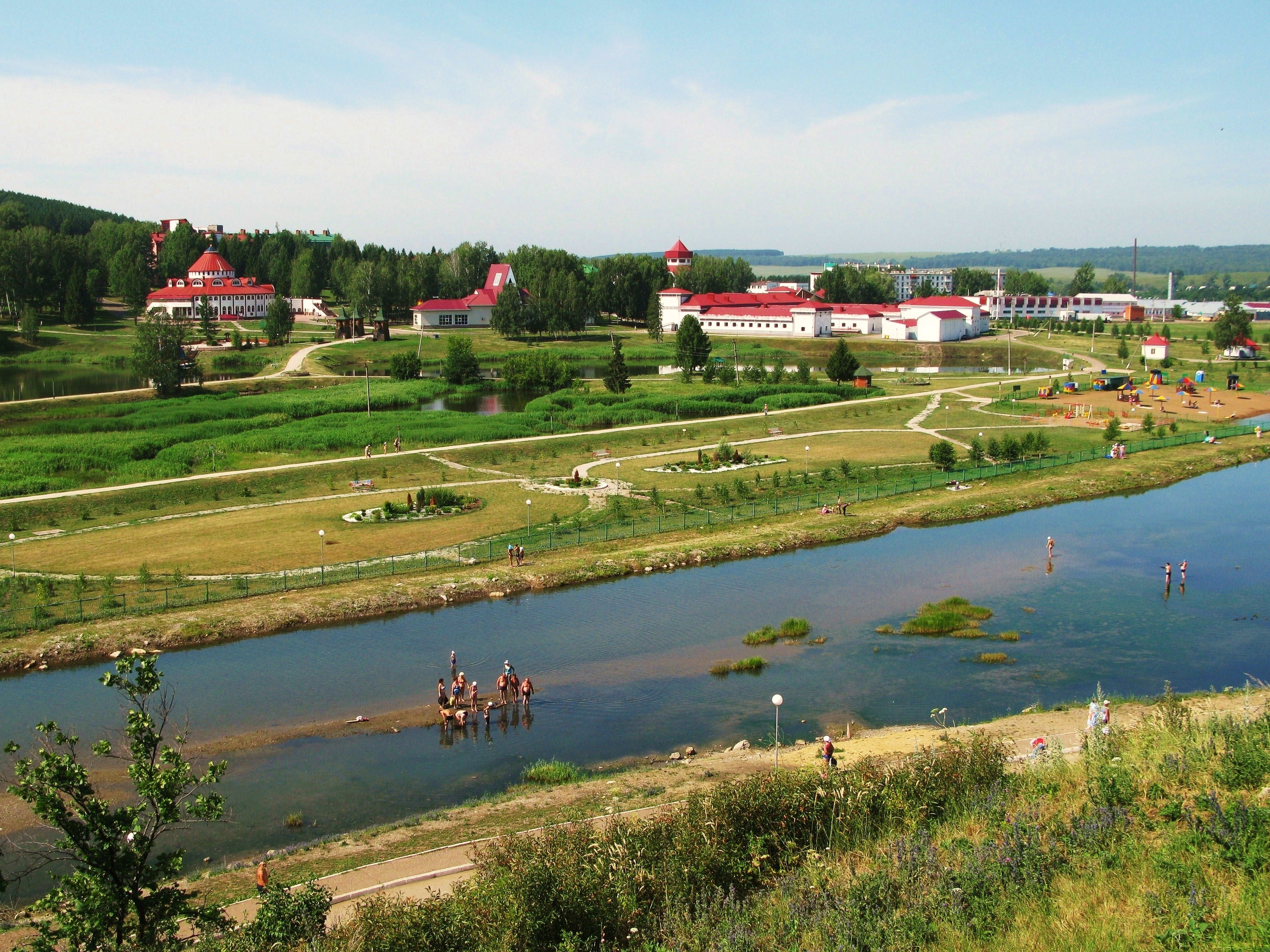

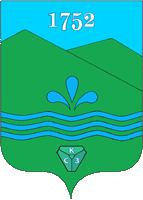
- Coat of arms
- Interactive map of Krasnousolsky
- Location of Krasnousolsky Krasnousolsky (Bashkortostan)
- Coordinates: 53°53′41″N 56°28′07″E
- Country: Russia
- Federal subject: Bashkortostan
- Administrative district: Gafuriysky District
- SelsovietSelsoviet: Krasnousolsky
- Founded: 1752

Population (2010 Census)
  - Total: 11,991
  - Estimate (1 January 1937): 9,660 (−19.4%)

Administrative status
  - Capital of: Gafuriysky District, Krasnousolsky Selsoviet

Municipal status
  - Municipal district: Gafuriysky Municipal District
  - Rural settlement: Krasnousolsky Selsoviet Rural Settlement
  - Capital of: Gafuriysky Municipal District, Krasnousolsky Selsoviet Rural Settlement
- Time zone: UTC+5 (MSK+2)
- Postal code: 453050
- OKTMO ID: 80621423101

Krasnousolsky (Russian: Красноусольский, Bashkir: Красноусол, Krasnousol) is a rural locality (a selo) and the administrative center of Gafuriysky District in Bashkortostan, Russia. Population: 11,991 (2010 census); The Krasnousolsk part of Krasnousolsky is a Spa town.
