= Gafuriysky District =

Gafuriysky District Гафурийский район (Russian)
- District

Other transcription(s)
  - Bashkir: Ғафури районы
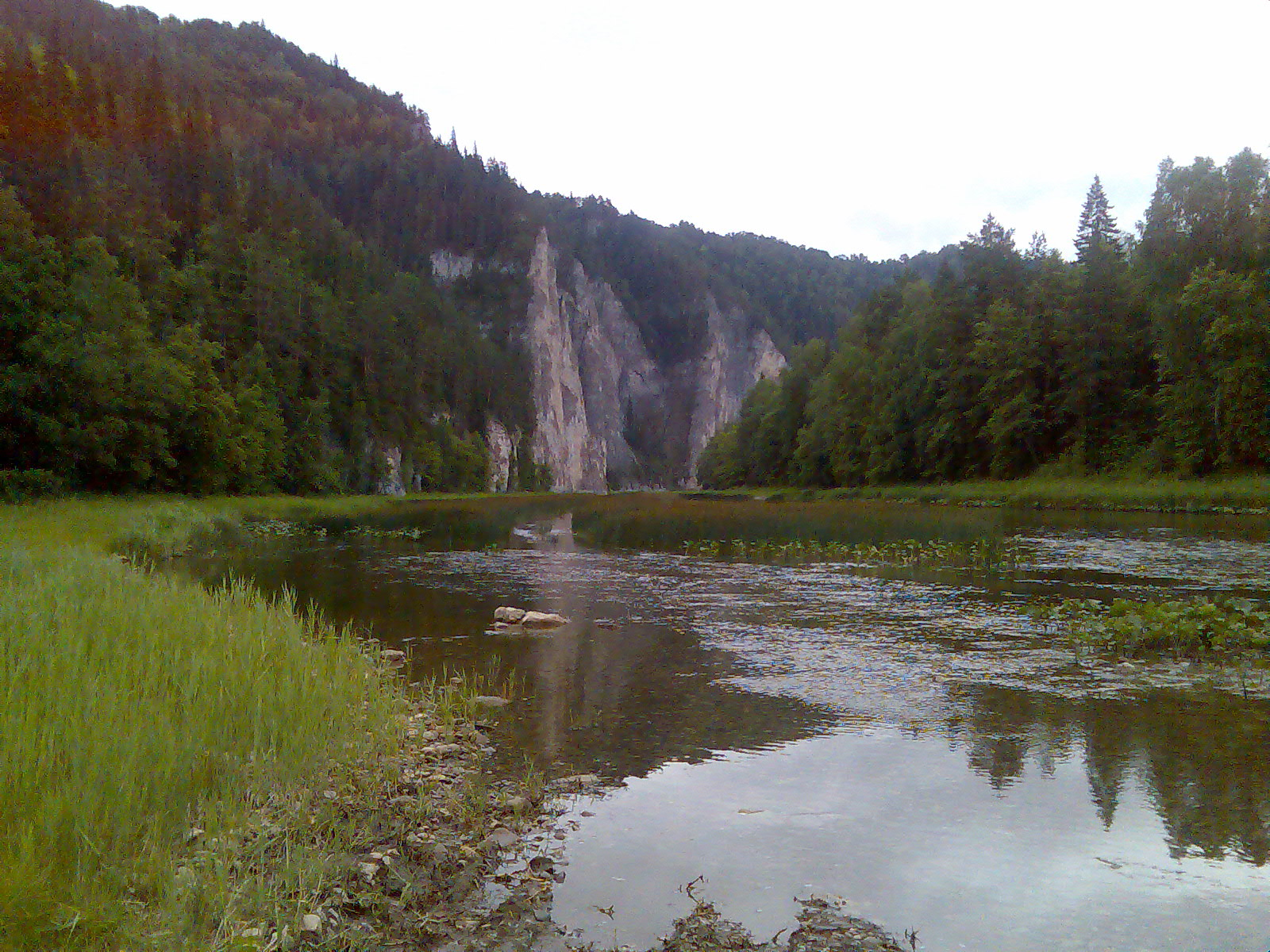
- View of Mambet Rock, Gafuriysky District

- Flag Coat of arms
- Location of Gafuriysky District in the Republic of Bashkortostan
- Coordinates: 53°54′N 56°28′E
- Country: Russia
- Federal subject: Republic of Bashkortostan
- Established: 1930
- Administrative center: Krasnousolsky

Area
  - Total: 3,038.02 km^{2} (1,172.99 sq mi)

Population (2010 Census)
  - Total: 33,869
  - Density: 11.148/km^{2} (28.874/sq mi)
  - Urban: 0%
  - Rural: 100%

Administrative structure
  - Administrative divisions: 16 Selsoviets
  - Inhabited localities: 95 rural localities

Municipal structure
  - Municipally incorporated as: Gafuriysky Municipal District
  - Municipal divisions: 0 urban settlements, 16 rural settlements
- Time zone: UTC+5 (MSK+2)
- OKTMO ID: 80621000
- Website: https://gafury.bashkortostan.ru/

Population of Gafuriysky District
- 2010 Census: 33,869
- 2002 Census: 36,761
- 1989 Census: 36,778
- 1979 Census: 44,655

Gafuriysky District (Russian: Гафури́йский райо́н; Bashkir: Ғафури районы, Ğafuri rayonı) is an administrative and municipal district (raion), one of the fifty-four in the Republic of Bashkortostan, Russia. It is located in the center of the republic and borders with Arkhangelsky District in the north, Beloretsky District in the east, Ishimbaysky District in the south, Sterlitamaksky District in the southwest, Aurgazinsky District in the west, and with Karmaskalinsky District in the northwest. The area of the district is 3,038.02 square kilometers (1,172.99 sq mi). Its administrative center is the rural locality (a selo) of Krasnousolsky. As of the 2010 Census, the total population of the district was 33,869, with the population of Krasnousolsky accounting for 35.4% of that number.

== History ==
The district was established in 1930 as Krasnousolsky District (Красноусольский район). It was given its present name in 1940.

The poet Majit Gafuri, the Turkologist Jalil Keyekbaev and the historian Niyaz Mazhitov were born here.

== Administrative and municipal status ==
Within the framework of administrative divisions, Gafuriysky District is one of the fifty-four in the Republic of Bashkortostan. The district is divided into sixteen selsoviets, comprising ninety-five rural localities. As a municipal division, the district is incorporated as Gafuriysky Municipal District. Its sixteen selsoviets are incorporated as sixteen rural settlements within the municipal district. The selo of Krasnousolsky serves as the administrative center of both the administrative and municipal district.
