= October 1919 =

Month in 1919

<<	October 1919					>>
Su	Mo	Tu	We	Th	Fr	Sa
			1	2	3	4
5	6	7	8	9	10	11
12	13	14	15	16	17	18
19	20	21	22	23	24	25
26	27	28	29	30	31

The following events occurred in October 1919:

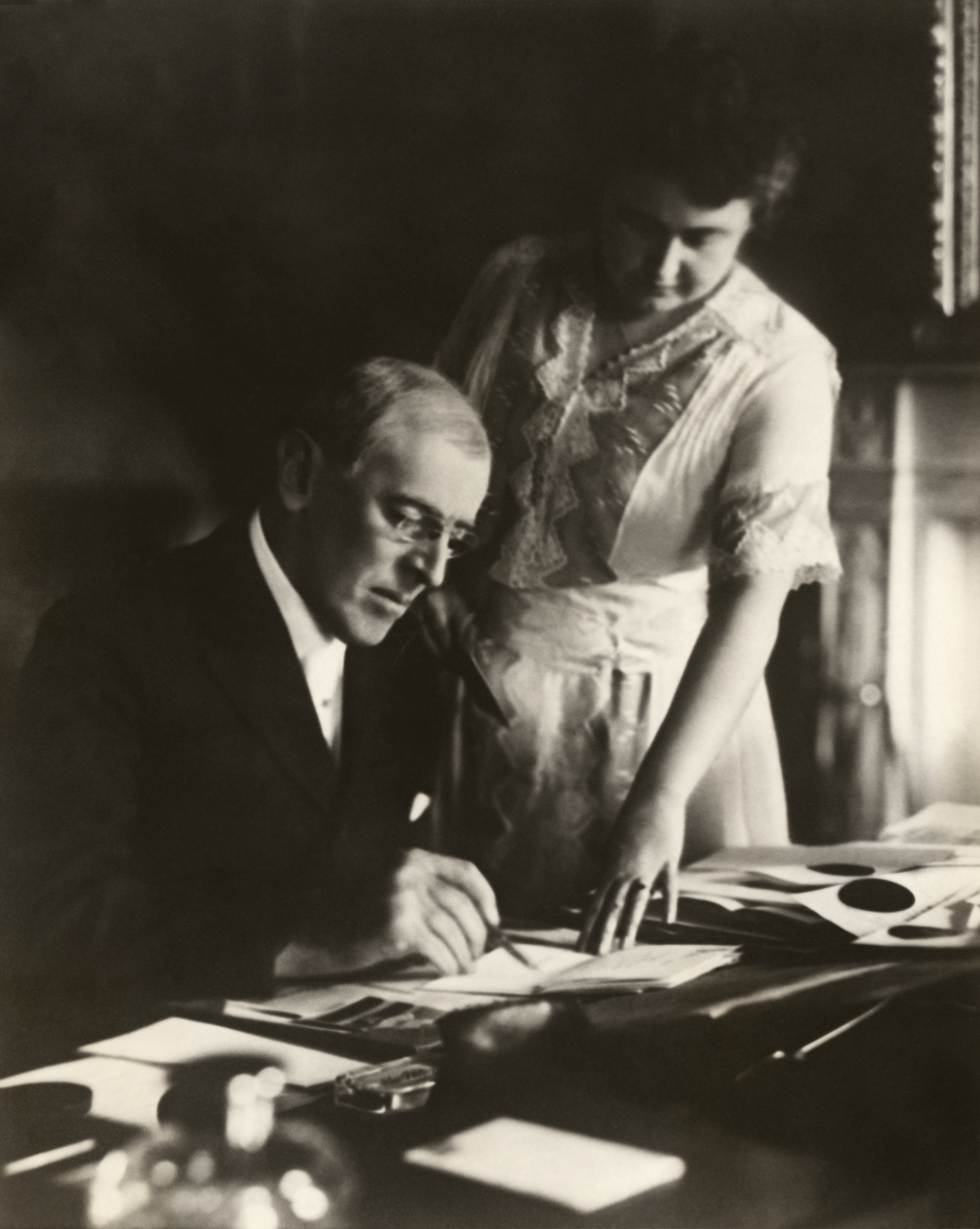
U.S. President Woodrow Wilson's first posed photograph after his stroke, with First Lady Edith Wilson holding a document steady while he signs.

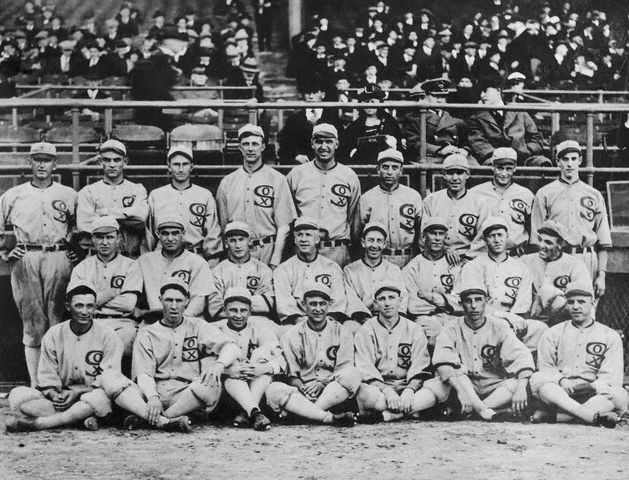
Team photo of the Chicago White Sox at the 1919 World Series. Several players were alleged to have intentionally thrown the series.

== October 1, 1919 (Wednesday) ==
- Red Summer – A race riot broke out in Baltimore when soldiers from Fort Meade started harassing and then attacking blacks in their neighborhoods. Local police intervened and after considerable fights were able to arrest six soldiers.
- The World Series began with the Chicago White Sox competing against the Cincinnati Reds. Rumors were already circulating that the game was fixed, with the odds against the Reds falling rapidly. Over the next four games, eight White Sox players were alleged to have made intentional errors during the games to fall behind the Reds in the series.
- The 24th Fighter Squadron of the United States Army Air Service was disbanded, but would be mobilized again for World War II.
- The Women's Royal Naval Service was disbanded. It would be revived again in 1939 at the start of World War II.
- The experimental radio station WWV began broadcasting near Fort Collins, Colorado.
- Australian Aircraft & Engineering was established in Sydney to make domestic aircraft for Australia.
- The Religious of Jesus and Mary order established the all-girls school Convent of Jesus and Mary in Delhi.
- The International Bible Students Association began publishing the bi-monthly religious magazine The Golden Age (later renamed Awake! in 1946).
- Army officer Wilford Fawcett was given permission from Stars and Stripes to publish a humor magazine called Captain Billy's Whiz Bang, leading to the establishment of Fawcett Publications and eventually Fawcett Comics, the first superhero comic books.
- Sports clubs were established in the following cities:
  - Klepp in Klepp Municipality, Norway with sections for football, handball, and gymnastics
  - Polonia in Środa Wielkopolska, Poland with sections for football, field hockey, handball and tennis.
- Born:
  - William E. DePuy, American army officer, first commander of the United States Army Training and Doctrine Command, two-time recipient of the Distinguished Service Cross, five Distinguished Service Medals, three Silver Stars, and the Legion of Merit; in Jamestown, North Dakota, United States (d. 1992)
  - Majrooh Sultanpuri, Indian composer, known for film scores including Friendship and The One Who Wins is The King; as Asrar ul Hassan Khan, in Sultanpur, Uttar Pradesh, British India (present-day India) (d. 2000)
- Died: Princess Charlotte of Prussia, 59, German noble, wife to Bernhard III, daughter to Frederick III; died of a heart attack (b. 1860)

== October 2, 1919 (Thursday) ==
- U.S. President Woodrow Wilson suffered a serious stroke at the age of 62, rendering him an invalid for the remainder of his life. However, his inner circle, led by the First Lady Edith Wilson and chief physician Cary T. Grayson, kept the general public in the dark about Wilson's health until February. Even then, Wilson's presidency continued for another year with Edith Wilson acting as a shadow steward of the executive branch.
- The North Shore Country Day School held its first day of classes in Winnetka, Illinois.
- English golfer Abe Mitchell won the 12th News of the World Match Play, defeating Scottish golfer George Duncan by one stroke at the Walton Heath Golf Club in Surrey, England.
- The People's Paper, a Dutch morning edition, was first published and now has a nation-wide circulation of 250,000.
- Born: Shirley Clarke, American filmmaker, known for her independent short films and documentaries including The Connection, The Cool World and Portrait of Jason, recipient of the Academy Award for Best Documentary Feature Film for Robert Frost: A Lover's Quarrel with the World, co-founder of The Film-Makers' Cooperative; as Shirley Brimberg, in New York City, United States (d. 1997)
- Died: Victorino de la Plaza, 78, Argentinian state leader, 18th President of Argentina (b. 1840)

== October 3, 1919 (Friday) ==
- American diplomat Henry Morgenthau Sr. released a report concerning the treatment of Jewish people in the Second Polish Republic, including accounts of the Pinsk massacre committed by the Polish Army on April 5.
- The Department of Island Territories was established by the New Zealand Government to oversee the Pacific Islands of Samoa, Niue, Tokelau and the Cook Islands. James Allen was appointed as the first minister for the department.
- The UCLA Bruins football team played their first game with Fred Cozens as coach.
- The Bowling Green Falcons football team played their first game, beating the Toledo Rockets football team 6-0 and starting an ongoing rivalry between Bowling Green State University and University of Toledo.
- Born:
  - James M. Buchanan, American economist, recipient of the Nobel Memorial Prize in Economic Sciences for his work on public choice theory, co-author of The Calculus of Consent; in Murfreesboro, Tennessee, United States (d. 2013)
  - Jack Waring, English rugby player, wing and centre for St Helens, Featherstone Rovers, and Warrington Wolves from 1939 to 1949, and the England national rugby league team in 1940; in Prescot, England (d. 2004)
- Died: Alfred Baumgarten, 76, German-Canadian business leader, president of the St. Lawrence Sugar Refinery in Montreal, governor of the Montreal General Hospital (b. 1842)

== October 4, 1919 (Saturday) ==
- American pilot Rudolph Schroeder, flying a Packard aircraft, achieved a new altitude world record of 9,622 meters (31,568 feet).
- Pope Benedict established the Territorial Prelate of Acre and Purus, named after the Acre River and Purus River of the Amazon. It eventually became the Roman Catholic Diocese of Rio Branco in 1986.
- The Australian comedy The Sentimental Bloke premiered in Melbourne.
- The French communist newspaper The Worker of Lot-et-Garonne was first published in Agen, France.

== October 5, 1919 (Sunday) ==
- A strike by railway workers in the United Kingdom ended with a new agreement signed between the rail companies and the National Union of Railwaymen.
- Born: Donald Pleasence, English actor, best known as Samuel Loomis in the Halloween horror film series, Ernst Stavro Blofeld in You Only Live Twice, and roles in The Great Escape, THX 1138, and Escape from New York; in Worksop, England (d. 1995)
- Died:
  - Townsend F. Dodd, 33, American air force officer, first commissioned officer of the American Expeditionary Forces, recipient of the Distinguished Service Medal; killed in a plane crash (b. 1886)
  - Wen Qimei, 52, Chinese matriarch, mother to Mao Zedong; died of lymphoma (b. 1867)

== October 6, 1919 (Monday) ==
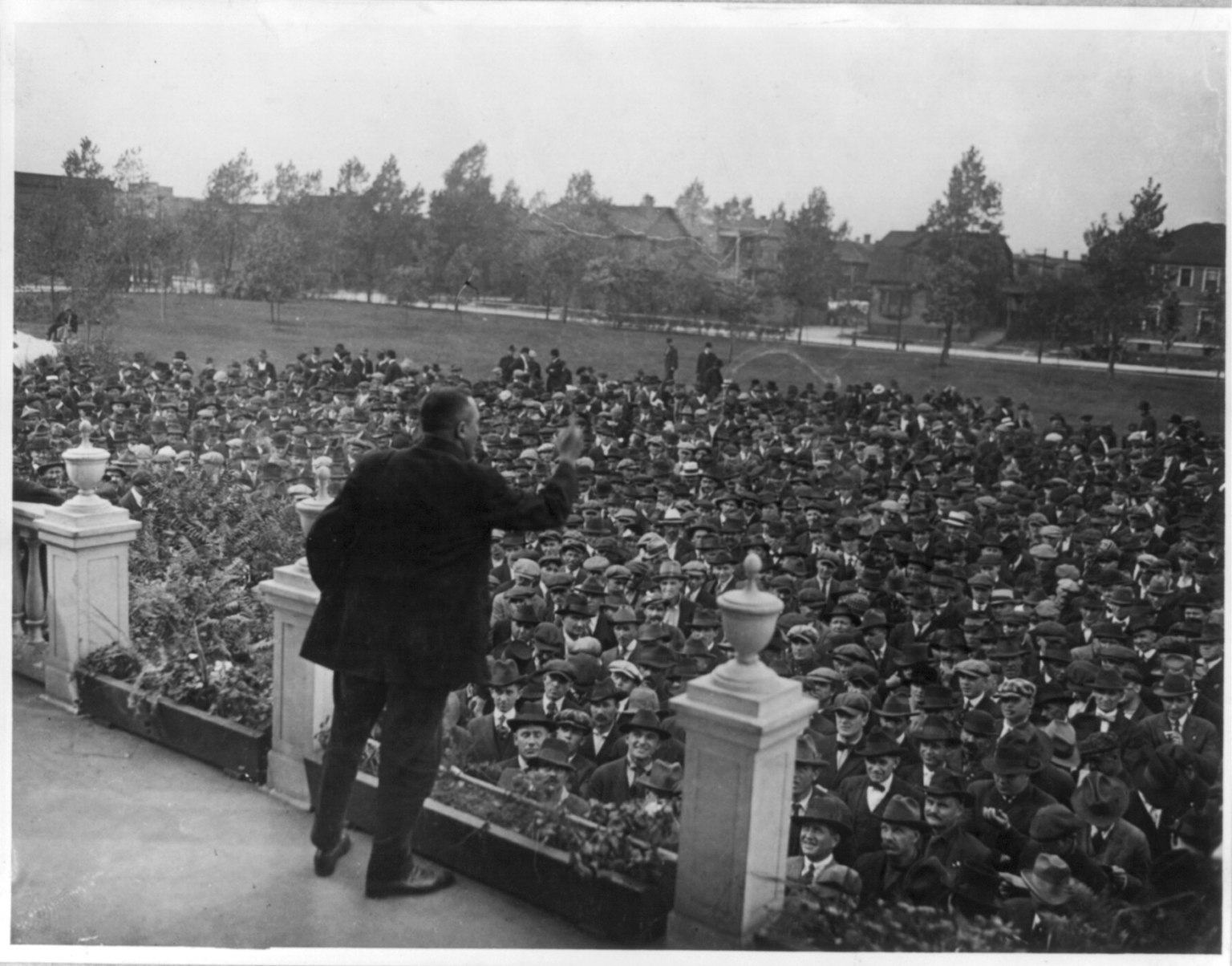
A labor leader rallies striking steelworkers in Gary, Indiana.

- Some 200 to 300 rebels that were against the United States occupation of Haiti attacked American marines in Port-au-Prince, but were destroyed by gunfire from the marines and Haitian militia.
- Escalating disorder during the steel workers strike in Gary, Indiana led to the United States Army entering the city to restore order.
- About 62% of voters in Norway approved maintaining a partial prohibition on alcoholic spirits from 1917 during a referendum.
- French pianist Alfred Cortot co-founded the École Normale de Musique de Paris.
- The bedroom farce The Girl in the Limousine, written by Wilson Collison and Avery Hopwood, premiered at the Eltinge 42nd Street Theatre in New York City with a successful run of 137 performances.
- Born:
  - Abe Saffron, Australian gangster, key figure in the Sydney underworld; in Annandale, New South Wales, Australia (d. 2006)
  - Tommy Lawton, English football player, forward for various clubs including Notts County from 1936 to 1956, and the England national football team from 1938 to 1948; in Farnworth, England (d. 1996)
- Died:
  - John Cameron, 73, Canadian politician, member of Edmonton Town Council from 1892 to 1896, developer of the Edmonton Public School Board; died of heart failure (b. 1846)
  - Ricardo Palma, 86, Peruvian writer, author of Peruvian Traditions (b. 1833)

== October 7, 1919 (Tuesday) ==
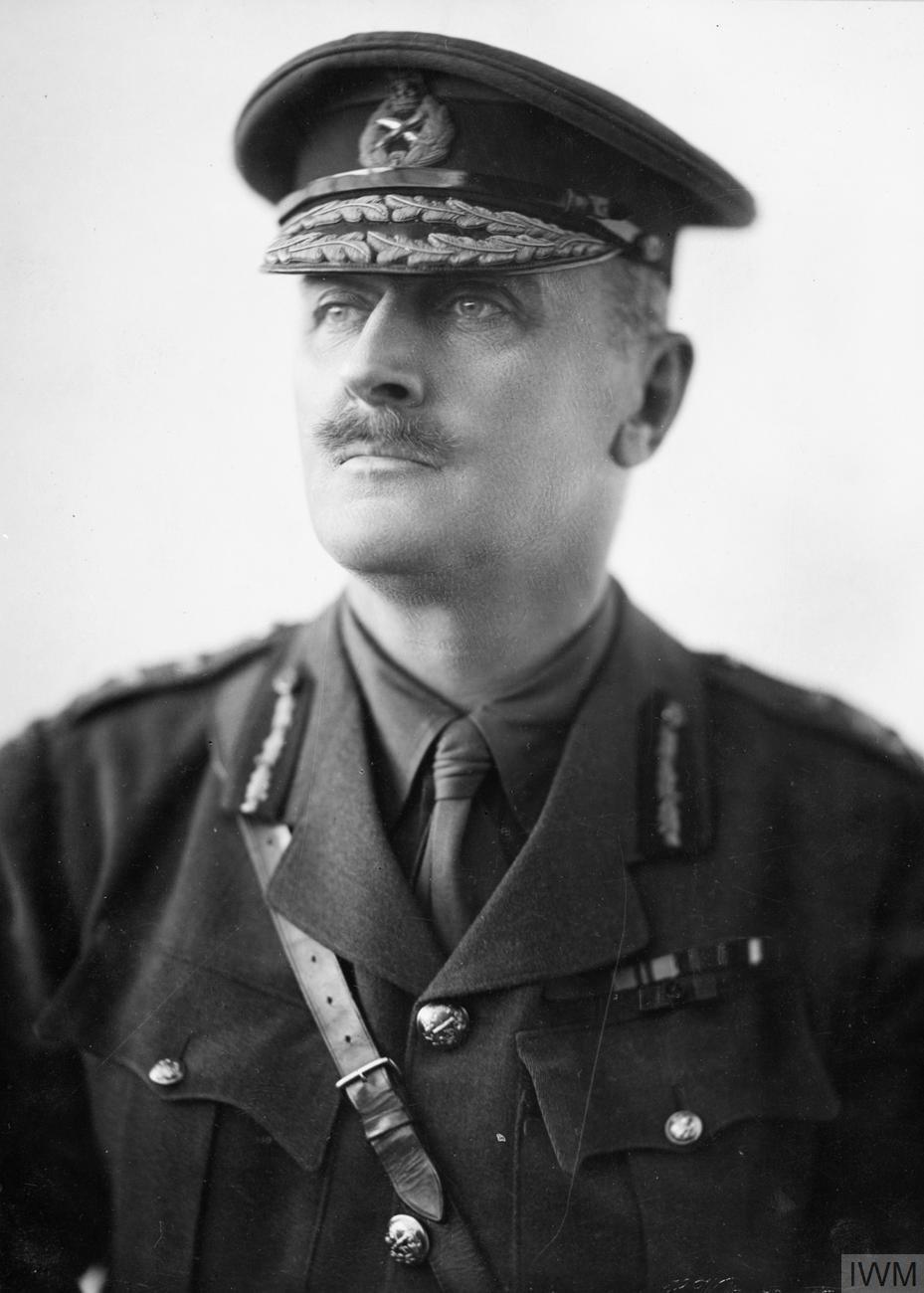
Field Marshal Edmund Allenby

- A group of Dutch businessmen led by Frits Fentener van Vlissingen formed the airline KLM with aviator Albert Plesman as its director. It remains the oldest airline still flying under its original name.
- Field Marshal Edmund Allenby was awarded the noble title of Viscount for his service for the British Army in the Middle East during World War I.
- American playwright Alice Gerstenberg premiered her satirical play Fourteen in San Francisco.
- Born:
  - Henriette Avram, American computer programmer, developer of the MARC standards; as Henriette Regina Davidson, in New York City, United States (d. 2006)
  - Erik Elmsäter, Swedish athlete, silver medalist in the 1948 Summer Olympics; as Fritz Erik Elmsäter, in Stockholm, Sweden (d. 2006)
  - Zelman Cowen, Australian state leader, 19th Governor-General of Australia; in Melbourne, Australia (d. 2011)
  - Annemarie Renger, German politician, 5th President of the Bundestag and first woman to hold that office; in Leipzig, Weimar Republic (present-day Germany) (d. 2008)
- Died: Alfred Deakin, 63, Australian state leader, 2nd Prime Minister of Australia; died of meningoencephalitis (b. 1856)

== October 8, 1919 (Wednesday) ==
- A U.S. Marine unit attempted to capture Haitian rebel leader Charlemagne Péralte who organized the attack on Port-au-Prince at this camp. Around 30 rebels were killed but Péralte managed to escape. He was eventually caught and killed on November 1.
- The Essex Royal Horse Artillery of the British Army was disbanded in Cairo.
- Sturt defeated North Adelaide 3.5 (23) to 2.6 (18) in front of a crowd of 35,000 at the Adelaide Oval in North Adelaide, Australia to win the South Australian Football League Grand Final.
- The Northern Ontario Hockey Association was established as the governing body of minor and junior league hockey in northern Ontario.
- The Cathedral of Saint Catharine of Siena was established in Allentown, Pennsylvania.
- Born:
  - Kiichi Miyazawa, Japanese state leader, 49th Prime Minister of Japan; in Fukuyama, Hiroshima, Empire of Japan (present-day Japan) (d. 2007)
  - Teruo Nakamura, Taiwanese-Japanese soldier, last known Japanese holdout after the surrender of Japan in 1945, arrested in Jakarta in 1974; as Attun Palalin, in Toran, Taitō Prefecture, Taiwan, Empire of Japan (present-day Chenggong, Taitung, Taiwan) (d. 1979)
- Died: Carlos Meléndez, 58, Salvadoran state leader, 24th President of El Salvador (b. 1861)

== October 9, 1919 (Thursday) ==
- The Cincinnati Reds won the World Series, five games to three, over the Chicago White Sox. However, rumors persisted and later confirmed that eight White Sox members intentionally threw games in exchange for gambling proceeds.

== October 10, 1919 (Friday) ==
- Estonia adopted radical land reform, nationalizing 97% of agrarian lands that mostly belonged to the Baltic Germans.
- Chinese revolutionary leader Sun Yat-sen reorganized the Kuomintang (Nationalist Party of China) after it had been shut down six years earlier by President Yuan Shikai.
- Trade union Sindicatos Libres was established in Barcelona.
- The League of Communist Youth of Yugoslavia was established in Zagreb.
- German composer Richard Strauss premiered his opera The Woman without a Shadow at the Vienna State Opera in Vienna. With contributions from Austrian poet Hugo von Hofmannsthal, the opera borrows fairy tale elements from Arabian Nights, Grimms' Fairy Tales, and Goethe's Faust and has often been compared to Mozart's Magic Flute. Initial public reception was unenthusiastic but the opera eventually became part of German canon.
- Born: Edgar Laprade, Canadian hockey player, centre for the New York Rangers from 1945 to 1955; in Mine Centre, Ontario, Canada (d. 2014)

== October 11, 1919 (Saturday) ==
- Orel–Kursk operation – The 13th and 14th Red Armies began their first successful counteroffensive against the White Army in the cities of Orel, Kursk, and Tula, Russia.
- American passenger ship American Legion was launched by New York Shipbuilding Corporation in Camden, New Jersey. It later became an important troopship during World War II.
- Collingwood defeated the Richmond 11.12 (78) 7.11 (53) in front of a crowd of over 45,000 spectators at the Melbourne Cricket Ground to win their fifth Victorian Football League Grand Final.
- The final football match between the United States Naval Academy's Midshipmen and the Johns Hopkins University's Blue Jays in Annapolis, Maryland, with the Midshipmen shutting out the Blue Jays 66-0 and ending the long-running series started in 1882 with a 9–3 record for the naval academy.
- The Polish Athletic Association was established governing body of all sports athletics organizations in Poland.
- Born:
  - Art Blakey, American jazz musician, drummer and bandleader for The Jazz Messengers; as Arthur Blakey, in Pittsburgh, United States (d. 1990)
  - Jean Vander Pyl, American voice actor, best known as the voice of Wilma Flintstone and Pebbles Flintstone in The Flintstones, and Rosie the Robot in The Jetsons; in Philadelphia, United States (d. 1999)
- Died: Karl Adolph Gjellerup, 62, Danish writer, developed the Modern Breakthrough that promoted naturalism in northern Europe, recipient of the Nobel Prize in Literature (b. 1857)

== October 12, 1919 (Sunday) ==
- A mutiny broke out among the Royal Navy fleet at Port Edgar, Scotland that had been set to be deployed to the Baltic and assist the White Russian forces in the Russian Civil War. Some 150 sailors left their posts and prevented the fleet from leaving port. Some 50 sailors then marched to the main government office at Whitehall in London with a list of demands on improving conditions among the fleet. 96 sailors and officers were arrested when the mutiny ended.
- Football club Odd Grenland defeated Frigg Oslo 1–0 to win the 18th Norwegian Football Cup in front of 10,000 spectators in Larvik, Norway.
- Camera manufacturer the Olympus Corporation was established in Tokyo as a manufacturer of scientific instruments.
- Born:
  - Doris Miller, American navy sailor, first African American to receive the Navy Cross for manning anti-aircraft guns on the USS West Virginia during the attack on Pearl Harbor; in Waco, Texas, United States (d. 1943, killed in action)
  - Vijaya Raje Scindia, Indian noble, consort to Jiwajirao Scindia, last Maharaja of Gwalior, India; as Lekha Divyeshwari Devi, in Sagar, British India (present-day India) (d. 2001)

== October 13, 1919 (Monday) ==
- Russian Civil War – The 8th and 13th Red Armies launched a counteroffensive against the White Army starting with an initial clash at the village of Moskovskoye south of Moscow.
- The Paris Convention was signed by 26 nations, establishing each country's sovereignty over its airspace. The agreement would take effect in 1922.
- The Leeds City club of the Football League Second Division was expelled amid financial irregularities.
- The Sedan railway line opened to the public, connecting the Monarto South railway station to Sedan, Australia.
- Born:
  - Delia Garcés, Argentine actress, noted female lead during the Golden Age of Argentine Cinema in the 1930s and 1940s; as Delia Amadora García Gerboles, in Buenos Aires, Argentina (d. 2001)
  - Jackie Ronne, American explorer, first woman to be part on an expedition team to Antarctica, co-discoverer of the Filchner–Ronne Ice Shelf; as Edith Jackie Ronne, in Baltimore, United States (d. 2009)

== October 14, 1919 (Tuesday) ==
- The Berkshire Royal Horse Artillery was temporarily disbanded in Cairo.
- The Wahl Clipper Corporation was established in Sterling, Illinois where it began manufacturing electric razor and grooming products.
- Born: Edward L. Feightner, American naval officer, commander of VFA-11 during the 1950s, recipient of four Distinguished Flying Crosses, two Legion of Merit, twelve Air Medals, and the Congressional Gold Medal; in Lima, Ohio, United States (d. 2020)
- Died:
  - Simon Hugh Holmes, 88, Canadian politician, 4th Premier of Nova Scotia (b. 1831)
  - Richardson Clover, 73, American naval officer, commander of the USS Bancroft during the Spanish–American War (b. 1846)

== October 15, 1919 (Wednesday) ==
- The Western India Automobile Association was established in Bombay.
- P. G. Wodehouse published his comic novel A Damsel in Distress through Barrie & Jenkins after it was serialized through The Saturday Evening Post earlier in the year.
- Born: Edwin Charles Tubb, British science fiction writer, best known for his Dumarest saga; in London, England (d. 2010)

== October 16, 1919 (Thursday) ==
- Adolf Hitler gave his first speech for the German Workers' Party during a political meeting at the Hofbräukeller restaurant in Munich.
- Flinders Chase National Park was established on Kangaroo Island, South Australia as a protected area. It became a national park in 1972, the second largest in Australia.
- The historic Condado Vanderbilt Hotel, built by Frederick William Vanderbilt, opened in San Juan, Puerto Rico.
- Ripley's Believe It or Not! first appeared as a cartoon in The New York Globe.
- Born:
  - Kathleen Winsor, American writer, author of Forever Amber; in Olivia, Minnesota, United States (d. 2003)
  - José Antonio Muñiz, Puerto Rican air force officer, co-founder of the Puerto Rico Air National Guard, recipient of the Air Medal and Soldier's Medal; in Ponce, Puerto Rico (d. 1960, killed in a plane crash)
- Died: Charles Harford Lloyd, 70, English composer, known for his chamber and organ compositions for Anglican church music (b. 1849)

== October 17, 1919 (Friday) ==
SMS Kaiser Franz Joseph I

- The White Russian Volunteer Army began the last of its pogroms against Jewish communities around Kiev with the village Ivankiv, Ukraine. Over three days, insurgents murdered 14 people, wounded another nine, and sexually assaulted 15 women and girls.
- United States Attorney General A. Mitchell Palmer appeared before the Senate to explain what was a perceived lack of progress on combating radicalism in the United States. Palmer answered that the U.S. Justice Department had amassed 60,000 names and were close to making arrests.
- Former Austro-Hungarian cruiser SMS Kaiser Franz Joseph I sank in a storm off the coast of Yugoslavia.
- General Electric established RCA using acquired assets from the Marconi Wireless Telegraph Company of America and recruited Marconi executive David Sarnoff as one of the new corporate leaders. Sarnoff would later be a key figure in developing NBC and RKO Pictures.
- King Alfonso inaugurated the new metro system in Madrid, with Line 1 running for 3.48 kilometres (2.16 mi) with eight stops including Bilbao, Chamberí, Cuatro Caminos, Gran Vía, Iglesia, Ríos Rosas, Sol, and Tribunal. On its official first day of operation two days later, it ran 390 trains carrying 56,220 passengers. Ticket fares for the first day totaled 8,433 pesetas.
- Frank Conrad began broadcasting an experimental radio broadcast with the call sign 8XK at 7750 Penn Avenue, in Pittsburgh. A year later, Conrad was able to form a public radio station called KDKA.
- The football club Leeds United was established but could not start playing in the league until the 1920–21 season as Port Vale had taken over the defunct Leeds City place in the English Football League.
- Born:
  - Violet Milstead, Canadian aviator, first female bush pilot and member of the Air Transport Auxiliary during World War II, recipient of the Order of Canada; in Toronto, Ontario, Canada (d. 2014)
  - Zhao Ziyang, Chinese state leader, 3rd Premier of the People's Republic of China; as Zhao Xiuye, in Hua County, Republic of China (present-day China) (d. 2005)
- Died: James Wolfe Murray, 66, British army officer, Chief of the General Staff from 1914 to 1915, recipient of the Order of the Bath for action during the Second Boer War (b. 1853)

== October 18, 1919 (Saturday) ==
- Australian Prime Minister Billy Hughes appointed judge Adrian Knox as Chief Justice of Australia.
- The Australian Imperial Force cricket tour started in South Africa against the South African Cricket Association the first cricket match played in the country since World War I. The Australian team won the match by two wickets.
- Sports and football clubs were established in the following cities:
  - Racing de Ferrol in Ferrol, Spain
  - Sports club Hindú in Don Torcuato, Argentina, which became well known for its rugby football team in the Unión de Rugby de Buenos Aires
- Born:
  - Pierre Trudeau, Canadian state leader, 15th Prime Minister of Canada, father of Justin Trudeau; as Joseph Philippe Pierre Yves Elliott Trudeau, in Outremont, Quebec, Canada (d. 2000)
  - Anita O'Day, American jazz singer, known for her collaborations with big band leaders Gene Krupa, Woody Herman, and Stan Kenton; as Anita Belle Colton, in Kansas City, Missouri, United States (d. 2006)
  - Williamson A. Sangma, Indian politician, first governor of Meghalaya, India; in Baghmara, British India (present-day India) (d. 1990)
  - George E. P. Box, British mathematician, leading developer of modern statistics; in Gravesend, England (d. 2013)
- Died:
  - William Waldorf Astor, 71, American business leader and philanthropist, supporter of the Hospital for Sick Children in London, and Oxford and Cambridge Universities, member of the Astor family; died of heart failure (b. 1848)
  - John Coles, 86, English business leader, chair of the East and West India Docks in London (b. 1833)

== October 19, 1919 (Sunday) ==
- Russian Civil War – The Red Army cavalry defeated its White Army counterpart at the village of Moskovskoye and pushed them to the village of Khrenovoe near the city of Voronezh, Russia.
- A force of 4,000 White Russian soldiers stationed in the Transbaikal region east of Lake Baikal in Russia held off a month-long assault by 2,000 Soviet partisans, inflicting some 500 casualties while losing 185 of their own men.
- Football clubs were established in the following cities:
  - Angers in Angers, France as a Ligue 1 team
  - Baník Prievidza in Prievidza, Slovakia

Born: Owen Filer, Welsh centenarian

== October 20, 1919 (Monday) ==
- Russian Civil War – A month-long offensive against the White Russians by the Insurgent Army under command of Nestor Makhno in Ukraine ended when they captured Ekaterinoslav on the Dnieper River. In all, the army inflicted 7,000 casualties and forced the surviving White troops to the port of Taganrog. The offensive helped contribute to the collapse of the White Russian advance on Moscow.
- Orel–Kursk operation – The Red Army captured the city of Kromy and advanced on Orel, Russia.
- Ernest Charles Drury of the United Farmers of Ontario won a majority in the Ontario provincial election, defeating the Conservative Party led by William Howard Hearst to form the 15th Government of Ontario. A referendum was also held to repeal prohibition of alcohol, with the majority voting against repeal.
- A tunnel collapse at the Levant Mine and Beam Engine in Cornwall, England killed 31 miners.
- French pilot Bernard de Romanet, flying a Nieuport-Delage airplane, achieved a new world speed record of 268.79 km/h (167.02 mph).
- The University of Science and Technology was established in Kraków, Poland.
- The School of Automotive Trades was established in Flint, Michigan to train students seeking careers in the auto industry. It was later acquired by General Motors in 1926. After the institute split from GM on 1982, it was renamed Kettering University (after auto inventor Charles F. Kettering) in 1998.
- Publishing house Duckworth Books released the novel Night and Day by Virginia Woolf.
- Football club Ceahlăul was established in Piatra Neamț, Romania.
- Born: Matthew Sands, American physicist, member of the Manhattan Project, co-author of The Feynman Lectures on Physics; in Oxford, Massachusetts, United States (d. 2014)
- Died: Walter Brack, German swimmer, gold and silver medalist at the 1904 Summer Olympics (b. 1880)

== October 21, 1919 (Tuesday) ==
- The first attempt to make a flight from England and Australia through a competition for a £A10,000 prize by the Australian government was made by pilot Captain George Campbell Matthews of the Australian Flying Corps with Sergeant Thomas D. Kay as his mechanic in a Sopwith Wallaby. Bad luck plagued the inaugural trip with bad weather delaying flights from Cologne and Vienna, and both men being detained as suspected Bolsheviks in Belgrade. Engine problems at Constantinople (now Istanbul) and more bad weather at Aleppo caused further delays. The flight competition was abandoned in April 1920 when the plane crashed in Bali where Matthews was slightly injured.
- British composer Frederick Delius premiered his last opera Fennimore and Gerda at the Frankfurt Opera House. It had intended to premier in 1910 at the Cologne Opera but World War I prevented its release.
- Erich von Stroheim directed and starred in the film Blind Husbands, released through Universal Pictures. The film was based on Stronheim's own short story The Pinnacle.
- Died: John Brown, 76, American indigenous leader, last chief of the Seminole Nation of Oklahoma (b. 1842)

== October 22, 1919 (Wednesday) ==
- The last official elections were held in the Ottoman Empire before it officially dissolved.
- United States Congress passed an act that allowed permits to be granted for private companies and individuals surveying for underground water in Nevada.
- The church and parish of María Auxiliadora was established in Montevideo.
- Born:
  - Doris Lessing, British writer, recipient of the Nobel Prize in Literature for her novels including The Grass Is Singing, The Golden Notebook and The Good Terrorist; as Doris May Tayler, in Kermanshah, Persia (present-day Iran) (d. 2013)
  - Morris Janowitz, American sociologist, developed military sociology; in Paterson, New Jersey, United States (d. 1988)
- Died: John Cyril Porte, 35, Irish-British aviator, developer of the flying boat at the Seaplane Experimental Station in Felixstowe, England; died of tuberculosis (b. 1884)

== October 23, 1919 (Thursday) ==
- The Detroit Symphony Orchestra provided the opening performance for the new Orchestra Hall in Detroit.
- The sports club Lunds was established in Lund, Sweden.

== October 24, 1919 (Friday) ==
- Russian Civil War – The 8th Army forced the White Russians out of Voronezh, Russia.
- Italian nationalist leader Gabriele D'Annunzio published an editorial in the Corriere della Sera in which he coined the term "mutilated victory" when referring to the broken Treaty of London of 1915. The broken treaty fueled the rhetoric of irredentists and nationalists in Italian politics.
- King Gustaf established the Royal Swedish Academy of Engineering Sciences in Stockholm.
- The Capitol Theatre in New York City became one of the largest cinemas in the world with 4,000 seats.

== October 25, 1919 (Saturday) ==
- Ohio State defeats Michigan in Ann Arbor, Michigan 13-3 for the first time in the rivalry's history during their 16th meeting.
- The Medical Women's International Association was established during an international female doctors conference in New York City.
- Garelli Motorcycles was established in Milan, where it became known for its champion Grand Prix motorcycles.
- The Ise Railway was extended in the Mie Prefecture, Japan, with stations Miyamado and Shiohama serving the line.
- Born:
  - Norman A. Erbe, American politician, 35th Governor of Iowa; in Boone, Iowa, United States (d. 2000)
  - Phạm Văn Đổng, Vietnamese army officer, military governor of Saigon during the Vietnam War, recipient of the Imperial Order of the Dragon of Annam, National Order of Vietnam, and Gallantry Cross; in Sơn Tây, French Indochina (present-day Vietnam) (d. 2008)
  - Beate Uhse-Rotermund, German aviator and entrepreneur, sole female stunt pilot in Germany in the 1930s, founder of Beate Uhse, the first retail "sex shop" company to sell adult entertainment products; as Beate Köstlin, in Cranz, East Prussia (present-day Zelenogradsk, Russia) (d. 2001)
- Died: William Kidston, 70, Australian politician, 17th Premier of Queensland (b. 1849)

== October 26, 1919 (Sunday) ==
- General elections were held in Luxembourg, following changes to the constitution earlier in the year to allow universal suffrage and proportional representation. This allowed the Party of the Right led by Émile Reuter to retain dominance of the government. Women participated in their first elections and were allowed to run for office, resulting in Marguerite Thomas-Clement being elected as the first woman parliamentarian.
- The Free Democratic Party of Switzerland won a majority of the seats in the National Council during the federal election in Switzerland.
- Russian Civil War – The 33rd Rifle Division of the Red Army captured Liksi, Russia and forced the White Russians over the Don River.
- Roscoe Arbuckle and Buster Keaton starred in their second hit comedy short The Hayseed.
- Born: A set of fraternal twins were born to the Pahlavi royal family in Tehran, Mohammad and Ashraf. Mohammad would grow to become Mohammad Reza Pahlavi, the last Shah of Iran, while his twin sister Ashraf Pahlavi played a key role in helping her brother gain power during the 1953 Iranian coup d'état.
- Born:
  - Edward Brooke, American politician, U.S. Senator from Massachusetts from 1967 to 1979, first African American elected to the United States Senate; in Washington, D.C., United States (d. 2015)
  - Jacob Pressman, American religious leader and academic, co-founder of the American Jewish University; in Philadelphia, United States (d. 2015)
- Died:
  - Akashi Motojiro, 55, Japanese army officer and state leader, 7th Governor-General of Taiwan (b. 1864)
  - Rachel Foster Avery, 60, American activist, secretary for the National American Woman Suffrage Association and close collaborator with Susan B. Anthony (b. 1858)

== October 27, 1919 (Monday) ==
- Orel–Kursk operation – The Red Army captured the city of Kromy, Russia.
- Axeman of New Orleans – Mike Pepitone was the final victim of the New Orleans ax attacks that started in 1918. His wife found his body in his bedroom just as a large, ax-welding man was fleeing the scene. Unfortunately, his wife was unable to provide a clear description of the killer. No further break-ins and attacks with an ax were reported after that night. The attacks and murders remain unsolved.
- A week long memorial for the late U.S. President Theodore Roosevelt culminated on what would have been his 61st birthday. The activities lead to establishing the Theodore Roosevelt Association the following year.
- British composer Edward Elgar premiered Cello Concerto in London, with Felix Salmond performing. The concert famously went ahead with inadequate rehearsal time, because musician Albert Coates was also conducting the rest of the programme.
- Born:
  - Tim Babcock, American politician, 16th Governor of Montana; in Littlefork, Minnesota, United States (d. 2015)
  - James Joseph Magennis, British naval officer, member of Operation Struggle during World War II, recipient of the Victoria Cross; in Belfast, Ireland (present-day Northern Ireland) (d. 1986)
  - Costin Murgescu, Romanian economist, promoter and eventually skeptic of Marxian economics, one of the players in setting up the Romanian revolution in 1989; as Constantin Ion Murgescu, in Râmnicu Sărat, Kingdom of Romania (present-day Romania) (d. 1989)

== October 28, 1919 (Tuesday) ==
- The 1919 peace treaty with Germany received royal assent, confirming Australia's membership as a sovereign nation in the new League of Nations, and indicating Australia's independence from the United Kingdom.
- The United States Congress passed the Volstead Act, over U.S. President Woodrow Wilson's veto. Prohibition went into effect on January 16, 1920, under the provisions of the 18th Amendment.
- Honduras held general elections, with Rafael López Gutiérrez of the Liberal Party of Honduras winning the presidency with 81% of the vote.
- The International Congress of Working Women was formed at a conference led by labor leader Margaret Dreier Robins in Washington, D.C., with over 200 delegates in attendance to discuss international workforce issues for women.
- Australia was entrusted to govern the Pacific island of Nauru.
- The first radio program was broadcast from the telegraph station at the Petřín lookout tower in Prague on the first anniversary of the establishment of independent Czechoslovakia.
- British journalist Arthur Ransome left Russia with his future wife Evgenia Petrovna Shelepina (previously Leon Trotsky's secretary) while carrying a diplomatic message for Estonia.

== October 29, 1919 (Wednesday) ==
- Women in New Zealand were allowed to stand for election into parliament. Rosetta Baume, Aileen Cooke, and Ellen Melville ran as the first female candidates, though none were elected.
- The first conference of the International Labour Organization was held at the Pan American Union Building in Washington, D.C. with French socialist leader Albert Thomas as its first director-general. Six international labour conventions were adopted including hours of work in industry, unemployment, maternity protection, night work for women, night work for young people in industry, and minimum age for work.
- The newspaper Alþýðublaðið was published as the mouthpiece for the Social Democratic Party in Iceland.
- Born:
  - Ralph Cheli, American air force officer, commander of the 405th Bombardment Squadron during World War II, recipient of the Medal of Honor, Air Medal and Distinguished Flying Cross; in San Francisco, United States (d. 1944, executed)
  - John K. Beling, American naval officer, commander of the USS Forrestal and USS Alstede, recipient of the Legion of Merit and Distinguished Flying Cross; in New York City, United States (d. 2010)
- Died:
  - Soyen Shaku, 59, Japanese clergy, first Zen Buddhist master to teach in the United States (b. 1860)
  - Albert Benjamin Simpson, 75, Canadian religious leader, founder of the Christian and Missionary Alliance (b. 1843)

== October 30, 1919 (Thursday) ==
- The 19th Royal Horse Artillery Brigade was disbanded in Cairo.
- The churches and parishes of Cristo de Toledo, Nuestra Señora de los Dolores, Nuestra Señora del Sagrado Corazón, San Miguel Garicoits, and Santuario Nacional del Corazón de Jesús were established in Montevideo.
- Born: Hermann Buchner, Austrian air force officer, commander of Jagdgeschwader 7 for the Luftwaffe during World War II, recipient of the Knight's Cross of the Iron Cross; in Salzburg, First Austrian Republic (present-day Austria) (d. 2005)
- Died: Ella Wheeler Wilcox, 68, American poet, known for poetry collections including Poems of Passion (b. 1850)

== October 31, 1919 (Friday) ==
- Red Summer – A race riot broke out in Corbin, Kentucky, when a vigilante mob rounded up 200 blacks and loaded them onto train cars out of town, following a mugging of a white man who identified the assailants as black men.
- The Augusta Southern Railroad in Georgia was bought out by Georgia and Florida Railroad.
- Born:
  - George R. Caron, American air force officer, tail gunner for the Enola Gay; in New York City, United States (d. 1995)
  - Alastair Hetherington, British journalist, editor for The Guardian from 1953 to 1975; as Hector Alastair Hetherington, in Glamorgan, Wales (d. 1999)
