= November 1919 =

Month in 1919

<<	November 1919					>>
Su	Mo	Tu	We	Th	Fr	Sa
						1
2	3	4	5	6	7	8
9	10	11	12	13	14	15
16	17	18	19	20	21	22
23	24	25	26	27	28	29
30

The following events occurred in November 1919:

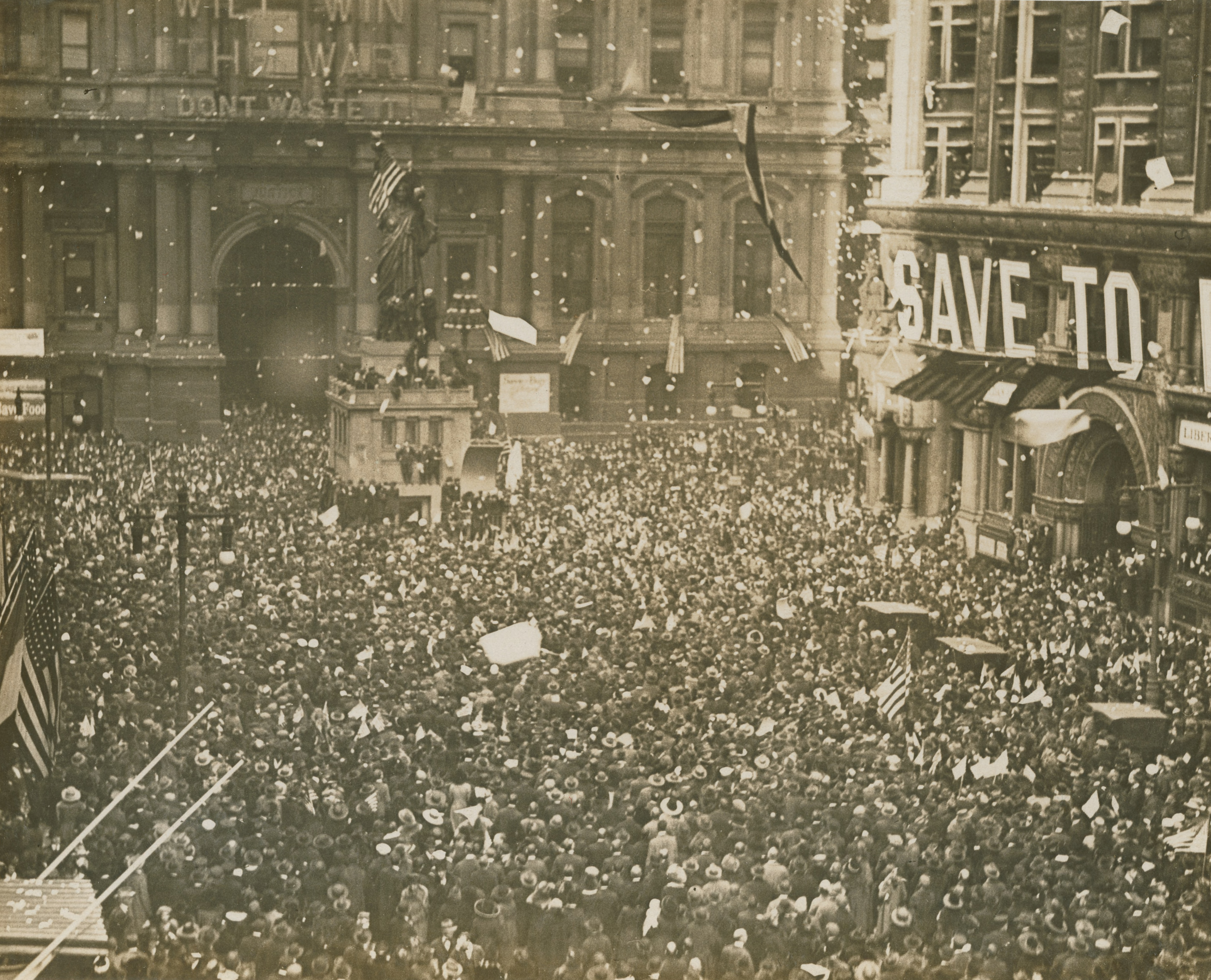
The first Armistice Day ceremonies are held around the world on November 11; here a crowd gathers for the ceremony in Philadelphia.

== November 1, 1919 (Saturday) ==
- The California State Senate unanimously voted in favor of the Nineteenth Amendment to the United States Constitution and the California State Assembly approved it with a vote of 73 for and 2 against, becoming the 18th state to ratify it.
- The United Mine Workers of America under John L. Lewis voted to strike in the United States.
- A collision between two trains near Vigerslev, Denmark killed 40 passengers and injured another 60 people.
- Haitian rebel leader Charlemagne Péralte was shot dead when his camp was ambushed by U.S. Marines under command of Sergeant Herman H. Hanneken. His body was photographed and distributed across Haiti to discourage further rebellion.
- The British government established the Government Communications Headquarters for intelligence and security for the United Kingdom.
- Electric motor manufacturer Pelger (later Combimac) was founded in Rotterdam.
- The University of Fine Arts was established in Poznań, Poland.
- The Royal Air Force College Cranwell was established at RAF Cranwell in England as a military academy for Royal Air Force officers.
- Bulimba Memorial Park was established in Bulimba, Queensland, Australia to commemorate local servicemen who participated in World War I.
- The Melbourne & Metropolitan Tramways Board was established to manage the Melbourne tram network until it merged into the Metropolitan Transit Authority in 1983.
- The Virginia Tech Regimental Band debuted the unofficial fight song of Virginia Tech, "Tech Triumph", during a football game against Washington and Lee University.
- Born:
  - Ted Shearer, Jamaican-American cartoonist, creator of Quincy, first comic strip to feature a leading African-American character; as Thaddeus Shearer, in May Pen, Jamaica (d. 1992)
  - Rajko Tomović, Serbian medical researcher, known for his research into the use of robotics and computer systems in medical treatment, including the computer system CER-10 and the multifunctional hand prosthesis; in Baja, Hungary (d. 2001)

== November 2, 1919 (Sunday) ==
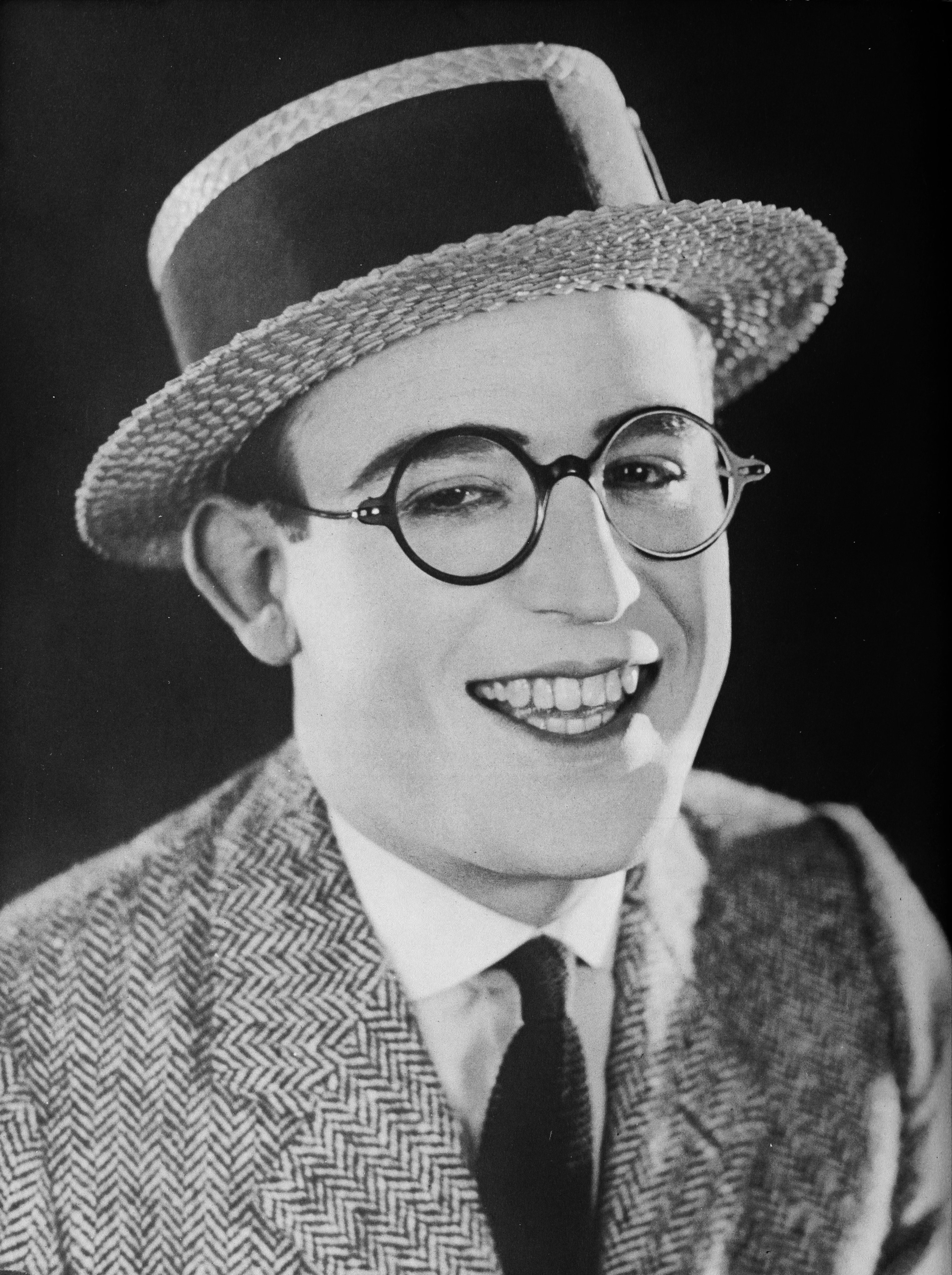
Film star Harold Lloyd

- Red Summer – A white mob lynched African-American Paul Jones in Macon, Georgia after he was accused of attacking a local white woman.
- The 20th Royal Horse Artillery Brigade was disbanded in Cairo.
- The German Christian Social People's Party was established during a national party conference in Prague.
- The French Confederation of Christian Workers was established for trade unions that follow Christian socialism.
- The Pacific Central Station opened in Vancouver. It was designated a Heritage Railway Site in 1991.
- Italian cyclist Costante Girardengo won the 15th edition of the Giro di Lombardia cycle race in Milan, completing the 256 km course with a time of 9 hours, 42 minutes.
- Harold Lloyd debuted his trademark "glasses" character in the film comedy Bumping into Broadway, following it up with Captain Kidd's Kids later that month. A copy of the film is preserved with the UCLA Film and Television Archive.
- Born: Louis Edward Curdes, American air force officer, commander of the 95th Fighter Squadron and 4th Fighter Squadron during World War II, two-time recipient of the Distinguished Flying Cross; in Fort Wayne, Indiana, United States (d. 1995)

== November 3, 1919 (Monday) ==
- Russian Civil War – The 8th and 13th Red Armies captured the town of Livny in its campaign against the White Army.
- An alliance between Richard Squires of the Liberal Reform Party and William Coaker of the Fishermen's Protective Union helped secure a majority of the seats 24th General Assembly of Dominion of Newfoundland during the general election.
- The Richmond County Courthouse opened on Staten Island, New York.
- Sports club Universitatea Cluj was established Cluj-Napoca, Romania and its best known for its football team in the second tier of the Romanian football league system.
- Born: Ludovic Kennedy, British journalist, known for his investigation into the Lindbergh kidnapping and convictions of Timothy Evans and Derek Bentley that resulted in them being overturned, and helping abolish the death penalty in the United Kingdom; in Edinburgh, Scotland (b. 2009)
- Died: Terauchi Masatake, 67, Japanese state leader, 9th Prime Minister of Japan (b. 1852)

== November 4, 1919 (Tuesday) ==
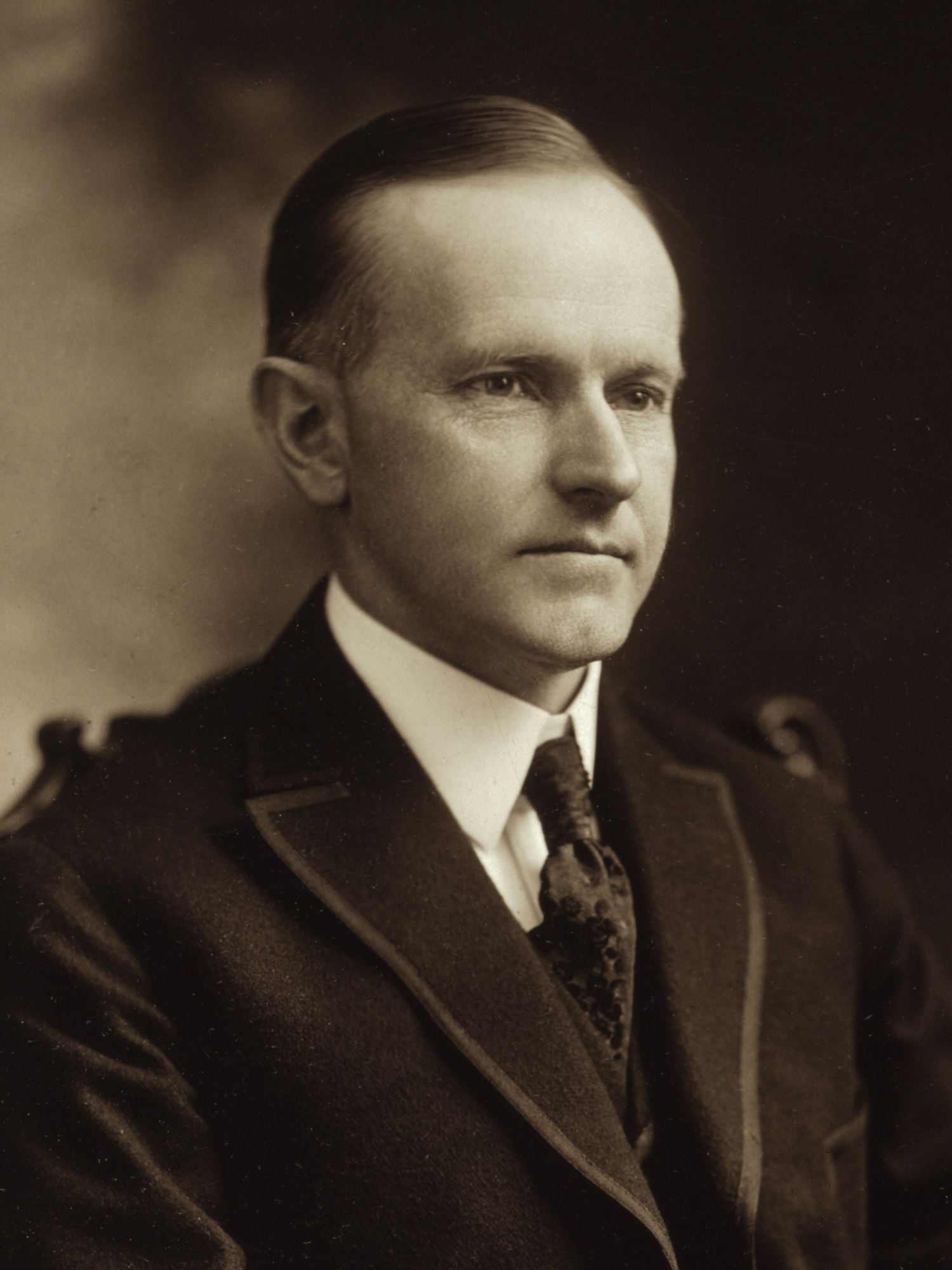
State governor Calvin Coolidge

- The Irish Committee of the British Cabinet settled on a policy of creating two Home Rule parliaments in Ireland – one in Dublin and one in Belfast – with a Council of Ireland to provide a framework for possible unity.
- The United States held elections were held in six states, with the following results:
  - Republican Edwin P. Morrow was elected 40th Governor of Kentucky, defeating Democrat incumbent James D. Black with 53% of the vote.
  - Democrat Albert Ritchie was elected 49th Governor of Maryland with barely half of the vote against Republican challenger Harry Nice.
  - Republican Calvin Coolidge retained his seat as Governor of Massachusetts, defeating Democratic challenger Richard H. Long with 60% of the vote.
  - Democrat Lee M. Russell was elected in a landslide as the 40th Governor of Mississippi.
  - Democrat Edward I. Edwards defeated Republican incumbent Newton A.K. Bugbee to become the 37th Governor of New Jersey with just under half of the vote.
  - James John Thomas defeated incumbent George J. Karb during city elections to become the 61st mayor of Columbus, Ohio.
- The Maine Senate ratified the 19th Amendment.
- The Australian film The Sentimental Bloke went into wide release, based on the popular verse poem The Songs of a Sentimental Bloke by C. J. Dennis. Directed by Raymond Longford and starring Arthur Tauchert in the title role, it became a hit in Australia and New Zealand despite having trouble finding distribution for a full year.
- The original Mercy Hospital opened in Nampa, Idaho. It moved to a larger building in 1967 and the original grounds were added to the National Register of Historic Places in 2014. Recent fire and damage forced the building to be demolished in 2016.
- Born:
  - Martin Balsam, American actor, known for roles in 12 Angry Men, Psycho, and Murder on the Orient Express, recipient of the Academy Award for Best Supporting Actor for A Thousand Clowns; in New York City, United States (d. 1996)
  - Eric Thompson, British racing driver, third-place finisher in the 1951 24 Hours of Le Mans and 1952 British Grand Prix; in Ditton Hill, Surbiton, London, England (d. 2015)
  - William E. Barber, American marine officer, commander of 2nd Battalion, 7th Marines during the Korean War, Medal of Honor for action at the Battle of Chosin Reservoir, recipient of the Silver Star and Legion of Merit; in Dehart, Kentucky, United States (d. 2002)
  - Joel Broyhill, American politician, U.S. Representative of Virginia from 1953 to 1974; in Hopewell, Virginia, United States (d. 2006)
  - Patrick Langford, Canadian air force officer, member of the No. 16 Operational Training Unit during World War II, member of the escape team from the German POW camp Stalag Luft III; in Edmonton, Canada (d. 1944, executed)
- Died: Sophia Tolstaya, 75, Russian writer, wife to Leo Tolstoy, author of My Life, Sofia Andreevna Tolstaya (b. 1844)

== November 5, 1919 (Wednesday) ==
- The Maine House of Representatives ratified the 19th Amendment, making it the 19th state to approve ratification.
- The Teaching Institute of the Red Army was established in Moscow.
- Born:
  - Myron Floren, American musician, best known as the accordionist on The Lawrence Welk Show; in Roslyn, South Dakota, United States (d. 2005)
  - Eddie Flynn, Irish football player, goalkeeper for various clubs including Drumcondra from 1938 to 1953; in Corduff, Ireland (d. 2002)

== November 6, 1919 (Thursday) ==
- Independent candidates won a majority of the seats in the House of Keys during elections in the Isle of Man.
- Radio station PCGG in The Hague became the first sustained radio broadcasting station in Europe and the first to provide entertainment for the general audience.
- Born:
  - Aftab Ghulam Nabi Kazi, Pakistani public servant, financial adviser for the Muhammad Zia-ul-Haq and Benazir Bhutto administrations; in Sindh, British India (present-day Pakistan) (d. 2016)
  - Lou Rymkus, American football player, tackle for the Cleveland Browns from 1946 to 1951, coach of the Baltimore Colts and Super Bowl V champion in 1970; in Royalton, Illinois, United States (d. 1998)

== November 7, 1919 (Friday) ==
- The first Palmer Raid in the United States was conducted on the second anniversary of the Russian Revolution. Federal agents under orders of United States Attorney General A. Mitchell Palmer raided the offices of the Union of Russian Workers in 12 cities, with around 250 arrests made.
- Inspired by Cape Town's daily Noon Gun Three Minute Pause, King George instituted two minutes of silence in the United Kingdom, following a suggestion by James Percy FitzPatrick, to be observed annually at the eleventh Hour of the eleventh Day of the eleventh Month.
- Died: Hugo Haase, 56, German politician, co-chair of the Council of the People's Deputies during the German Revolution; assassinated (b. 1863)

== November 8, 1919 (Saturday) ==
- The Romanian National Party won a majority of the seats in the Chamber of Deputies and the Senate during general elections in Romania, in part by running unopposed in Transylvania.
- The Military Academy for Commanding Officers of the Red Army was established in Petrograd.
- Born:
  - Cy Grant, Guyanese musician and actor, noted for his collaboration with the British variety television program Tonight and science fiction series Captain Scarlet and the Mysterons; as Cyril Ewart Lionel Grant, in Beterverwagting, British Guiana (present-day Guyana) (d. 2010)
  - Herbert S. Gutowsky, American chemist, developed nuclear magnetic resonance methods for research into molecules; in Bridgman, Michigan, United States (d. 2000)
  - Philip J. Klass, American journalist, known for his skeptical investigation in UFOs; in Des Moines, Iowa, United States (d. 2005)

== November 9, 1919 (Sunday) ==
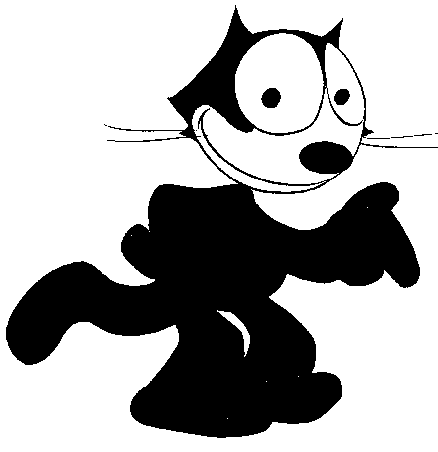
Felix the Cat debuts

- The Communist Party of Denmark was established.
- Felix the Cat appeared in Feline Follies, marking the first cartoon character to become popular.
- Born: Jerry Priddy, American baseball player, second baseman for the New York Yankees, Washington Senators, St. Louis Browns, Detroit Tigers from 1942 to 1953, 1941 World Series champion; as Gerald Edward Priddy, in Los Angeles, United States (d. 1980)
- Died:
  - Edgar Samuel Paxson, 67, American painter, best known for his portraits of Native Americans in the United States including the Battle of the Little Bighorn (b. 1852)
  - Walter Weyl, 46, American writer, leading promoter of progressivism in the United States, co-editor of The New Republic, author of The New Democracy; died of throat cancer (b. 1873)
  - Liborio Zerda, 85, Colombian physician, known for his research into the Muisca indigenous culture in Colombia (b. 1834)

== November 10, 1919 (Monday) ==
- The Supreme Court of the United States upheld the conviction of Jacob Abrams for inciting resistance to the war effort against Soviet Russia.
- The first national convention of the American Legion was held in Minneapolis where it was agreed the organization would be strictly non-partisan.
- The Air Force Institute of Technology was established in Dayton, Ohio as a graduate school for American air force officers.
- The Blériot-SPAD S.27 aircraft made its first test flight and would be used for air mail service between Paris and London.
- Born:
  - Mikhail Kalashnikov, Russian engineer, inventor of the AK-47 assault rifle and PK machine gun; in Kurya, Russian SFSR (present-day Russia) (d. 2013)
  - Moïse Tshombe, Congolese state leader, 5th Prime Minister of the Democratic Republic of the Congo; in Musumba, Belgian Congo (present-day Democratic Republic of the Congo) (d. 1969)
  - Michael Strank, Czech-American marine, member of the 2nd Battalion, 28th Marines during World War II, one of the six marines photographed in the Raising the Flag on Iwo Jima; as Mykhal Strenk, in Jarabina, Czechoslovakia (present-day Slovakia) (d. 1945, killed in action during the Battle of Iwo Jima)
  - Siegfried Freytag, German air force officer, commander of Jagdgeschwader 77 for the Luftwaffe during World War II, recipient of the Knight's Cross of the Iron Cross; in Danzig-Langfuhr, Weimar Republic (present-day Wrzeszcz, Poland) (d. 2003)
  - Steve Pisanos, Greek-American air force officer, commander of the 4th Fighter Group during World War II, recipient of five Distinguished Flying Crosses, three Legion of Merits, and eleven Air Medals; as Spiros Pisanos, in Athens, Kingdom of Greece (present-day Greece) (d. 2016)

== November 11, 1919 (Tuesday) ==
- The first Armistice Day was observed at Buckingham Palace in London with a military ceremony that included a two-minute silence at 1100 hours for all servicemen in the British Empire who died during World War I. The same day, U.S. President Woodrow Wilson released a proclamation asking Americans to observe two minutes of silence for American servicemen who died while overseas in the war effort. In time, the day evolved into Remembrance Day for much of the British Commonwealth to include those who died while serving in World War II and the Korean War as well as more recent conflicts. In the United States, the day is observed as Veterans Day to include World War II, the Korean War, the Vietnam War, as well as other recent conflicts.
- Veterans with the American Legion and workers with the Industrial Workers of the World clashed in Centralia, Washington following a parade commemorating the first anniversary of Armistice Day. The violent riot, dubbed the Centralia massacre, resulted in six deaths. Five involved Legion members including Warren Grimm, a celebrated veteran, who was shot by an unknown assailant. The sixth casualty was union member Wesley Everest, who was lynched that evening from the jail house for shooting and wounding another Legion member earlier that day.
- Red Summer – A white mob lynched African-American Jordan Jameson in Magnolia, Arkansas, after he had allegedly shot dead a local sheriff.
- The Union Bank of India was established in Bombay.
- Hart House, a center for students, opened at the University of Toronto.
- The Irish Bulletin was first published as the official newspaper of the Irish Republic, with Desmond FitzGerald as the editor.

== November 12, 1919 (Wednesday) ==
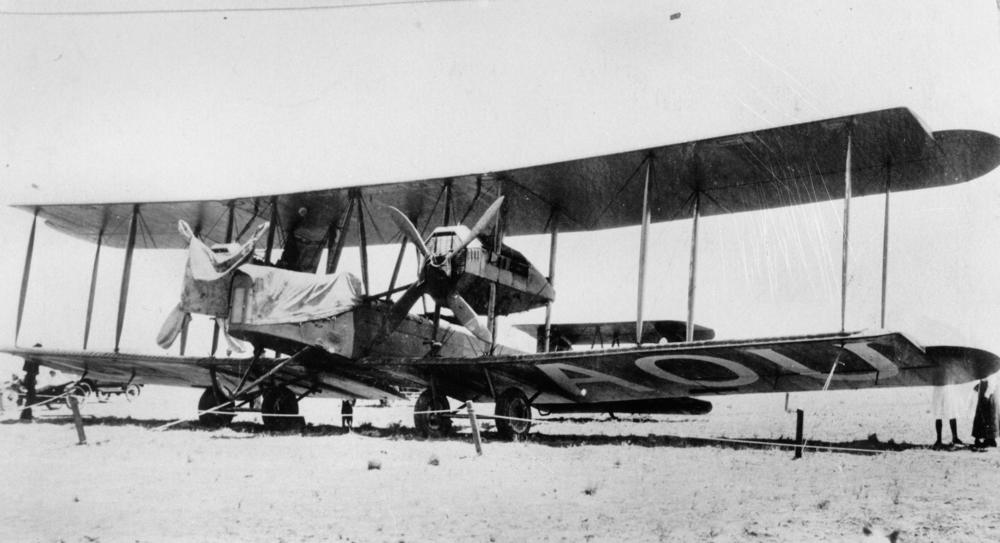
The Vickers Vimy bomber used to successfully fly from England to Australia.

- The second attempt to fly from England and Australia was made by Captain Ross Macpherson Smith of the Australian Flying Corps with his brother Lieutenant Keith Macpherson Smith as co-pilot, along with two mechanics, in a converted Vickers Vimy bomber. They would complete the flight in just under a month to win the prize competition. Both brothers received knighthoods for their efforts.
- The stage comedy Wedding Bells by Edward Salisbury Field debuted on Broadway and ran for 168 performances.

== November 13, 1919 (Thursday) ==
- Red Summer – A race riot broke out in Wilmington, Delaware after a mob tried to lynch three black men charged with the shooting of two police officers. After learning the prisoners were transferred out of state, a mob of 300 whites descended on a black neighborhood where clashes resulted in the shooting of a black resident. City police were able to stop the rioting from escalating further.
- An Alliance Seabird airplane piloted by Lieutenant Roger Douglas with navigator Lieutenant J.S.L. Ross crashed shortly after takeoff from Hounslow Heath Aerodrome in England while attempting a flight from England to Australia during a competition for the Australian Government prize of £10,000. Both men were killed and the Alliance Aeroplane Company that built the aircraft folded in 1920.

== November 14, 1919 (Friday) ==
- Russian Civil War – The White Russian Siberian Army under command of General Vladimir Kappel began its 2000-kilometer winter retreat from Omsk, Russia across Siberia to Chita. Kappel died midway through the march along with thousands of his men, with his successor Sergey Voytsekhovsky leading the survivors to eventual safety by the following March.
- The Royal Air Force disbanded squadron No. 17 in Constantinople (now Istanbul).
- The Sigma Delta Pi honor society was established for Spanish-speaking students at the University of California, Berkeley.
- Died: Henry Lee Higginson, 84, American philanthropist, founder of the Boston Symphony Orchestra (b. 1834)

== November 15, 1919 (Saturday) ==
- The Home Rule Party of Iceland retained a majority of the parliament seats during parliamentary elections.
- The construction of the San Diego and Arizona Railway was completed at a cost of $18 million.
- Born: Joseph Wapner, American judge and television personality, best known as the first judge in the television reality series The People's Court; in Los Angeles, United States (d. 2017)
- Died: Alfred Werner, 52, German chemist, recipient of the Nobel Prize in Chemistry for the development of coordination complex chemistry; died of arteriosclerosis (b. 1866)

== November 16, 1919 (Sunday) ==
- Russian Civil War – The 8th and 13th Red Armies pushed White Russian forces out of the Voronezh, Russia to effectively end the Voronezh–Kastornoye operation.
- The general election in Italy resulted in the collapse of the Liberal Union, with Italian Socialist Party and Italian People's Party gaining many seats in the Chamber of Deputies.
- Belgium held the first general elections since 1914, with the Catholic Party retaining a majority in both the Chamber of Representatives and the Senate despite the Belgian Labour Party receiving the most votes for the Chamber. Voter turnout was close to 89%, due to universal suffrage being offered the first time in Belgian elections.
- The Taiwan Governor-General Railway opened new rail stations Xishi and Zhutian on the Pingtung line in Pingtung County, and Jiaoxi on the Yilan line in Yilan County, Taiwan.
- American actress Constance Talmadge became a star thanks to lead role in the film comedy A Virtuous Vamp, which was an adaptation of a play by Clyde Fitch. The film was selected for the National Film Registry in 2013.
- Born: Anatoly Dobrynin, Russian diplomat, Ambassador to the United States from 1962 to 1986; in Mozhaysk, Russian SFSR (present-day Russia) (d. 2010)

== November 17, 1919 (Monday) ==
- The Art Museum of Estonia was established at Kadriorg Palace in Tallinn, Estonia.

== November 18, 1919 (Tuesday) ==
- Orel–Kursk operation – The 13th and 14th Red Armies captured Kursk, Russia as the White forces retreated, effectively ending the month-long operation.
- The Broadway musical Irene, with music by Harry Tierney and starring Edith Day in the title role, premiered at the Vanderbilt Theatre in New York City and ran for 675 performances thanks to memorable hit songs such as "Alice Blue Gown".
- Born:
  - Andrée Borrel, French partisan fighter, member of the French Resistance and Special Operations Executive, recipient of the Croix de Guerre and Resistance Medal; in Becon les Bruyeres, France (d. 1944, executed)
  - Elizabeth Mahon, American baseball player, outfielder and second base for the All-American Girls Professional Baseball League from 1944 to 1952; in Greenville, South Carolina, United States (d. 2001)

== November 19, 1919 (Wednesday) ==
- The Treaty of Versailles failed a critical ratification vote in the United States Senate. It would never be ratified by the United States.
- Zion National Park was established near Springdale, Utah.
- The auto parts manufacturer Kayaba was established in Tokyo.
- The Catholic Church established the Apostolic Prefecture of Celebes from territory split off from the Apostolic Vicariate of Batavia in Celebes, Indonesia, eventually becoming the Roman Catholic Diocese of Manado in 1961.
- The Jamiat Ulema-e-Hind, or Organisation of Indian Islamic Scholars, was established in New Delhi.
- Journalist Constancio C. Vigil published the first edition of the weekly children's magazine Billiken in Buenos Aires, and remains the oldest Spanish-language magazine for young people.
- The newspaper Tauta was published as a mouthpiece for the Party of National Progress in Kaunas, Lithuania. It ran for 65 issues before folding in 1920.
- The student newspaper The Heights was first published at Boston College.
- American expatriate Sylvia Beach opened the Shakespeare and Company bookstore in Paris, where it became a major visiting stop for Parisian literary circle during the 1920s.
- Centrale Burgerlijke Ziekeninrichting Salemba, Weltevreden, Batavia, Indonesia began operations, providing healthcare services to the community of the city of Batavia—now known as Jakarta. The hospital now known as Rumah Sakit Umum Pusat Nasional Dr Cipto Mangunkusumo Jakarta, Indonesia.
- Born:
  - Alan Young, British-American actor, best known for 1950s variety television show The Alan Young Show, the 1960s television comedy Mister Ed, and his collaboration with Disney Films including the voice of Scrooge McDuck in Mickey's Christmas Carol; as Angus Young, in North Shields, England (d. 2016)
  - Gillo Pontecorvo, Italian film director, best known for his films The Battle of Algiers, Kapo, and Burn!; as Gilberto Pontecorvo, in Pisa, Kingdom of Italy (present-day Italy) (d. 2006)
  - Lolita Lebrón, Puerto Rican revolutionary leader, leader of the 1954 United States Capitol shooting; as Dolores Lebrón Sotomayor, in Lares, Puerto Rico (d. 2010)
  - Morris Kight, American activist, promoter of gay rights in the United States; in Comanche County, Texas, United States (d. 2003)
  - Margaret Whitlam, Australian social leader, wife to Australian Prime Minister Gough Whitlam; as Margaret Elaine Dovey, in Bondi, New South Wales, Australia (d. 2012)

== November 20, 1919 (Thursday) ==
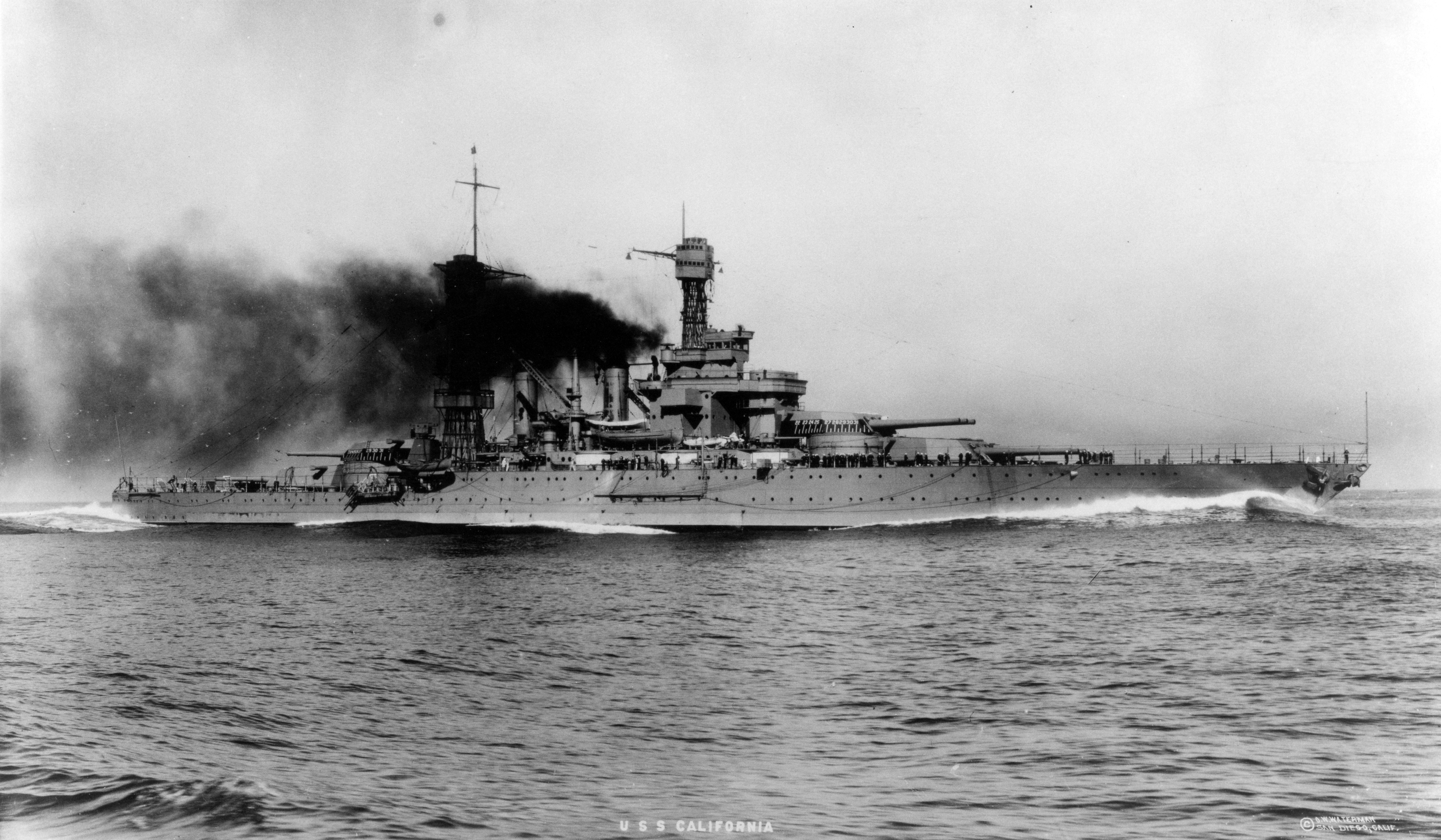
U.S. battleship California

- Lithuania legalized universal suffrage for all citizens over the age of 21 in accordance with its 1918 constitution.
- The Australian Government appealed directly to the Admiralty of the Royal Australian Navy of the decision by the Naval Board to convict five sailors for leading a mutiny on battlecruiser HMAS Australia while it was in Fremantle, Australia, deeming their sentences were too severe since the insubordination only caused a one-hour delay for the ship to leave port for Melbourne. Two member officers on the Naval Board resigned in protest for the government going over the Naval Board to the Admiralty when making the appeal, but all five convicted sailors were released within a month.
- U.S. Navy battleship California was launched from the Mare Island Naval Shipyard in Vallejo, California. It would play an important role the Pacific War during World War II.
- The Accrington Pals, formerly of Kitchener's Army for World War I, was disbanded in Accrington, England.
- A municipal airport opened at Tucson, Arizona, eventually becoming Tucson International Airport.
- Bandleader Ben Selvin released a recording of the song "Dardanella" by Fred Fisher through Victor Records. The song became a large hit, with some sales of the recording estimated at five million copies.
- Born:
  - Harold Bird-Wilson, British air force officer, commander of the No. 152 and No. 66 Squadrons during World War II, recipient of the Order of the British Empire, Distinguished Service Order, Distinguished Flying Cross, and Airman's Cross; in Prestatyn, Wales (d. 2000)
  - Tin Ka Ping, Chinese business leader and philanthropist, founder of Tin's Chemical Industrial Company and the Tin Ka Ping Foundation, recipient of the Order of the British Empire and Grand Bauhinia Medal; in Dabu County, Republic of China (present-day China) (d. 2018)

== November 21, 1919 (Friday) ==
- The third attempt to fly from England and Australia for a £A10,000 prize by the Australian government was made by Australian explorer Captain Hubert Wilkins (in place of Charles Kingsford Smith who had to drop out) with Lieutenant V. Rendle as pilot and two other crew in a Blackburn Kangaroo. However, the plane experienced engine problems throughout the flight and landed in France.
- The Provincial Christian-Socialist Party was formed in Košice, Slovakia through a merger of two Catholic associations from Košice and Bratislava, with the party's first convention held the following year.
- The transport company JVB was established in Fagernes, Norway.
- Born: Gert Fredriksson, Swedish canoeist, eight-time Olympic gold medalist at the 1948, 1952, 1956, and 1960 Summer Olympics; in Nyköping, Sweden (d. 2006)

== November 22, 1919 (Saturday) ==
- Four labor organizers were killed by a white paramilitary group during a labor dispute at the Great Southern Lumber Company in Bogalusa, Louisiana.
- A solar eclipse occurred that was observed over half of North America, much of South America, parts of Western Europe and a third of Africa.
- Born: Tony Reddin, Irish hurler, goalkeeper with Galway and Tipperary from 1941 to 1957; as Martin Charles Reddington, in County Galway, Ireland (d. 2015)
- Died: Francisco Moreno, 67, Argentinean explorer, best known for his exploration and development of the Patagonia region in southern Argentina (b. 1852)

== November 23, 1919 (Sunday) ==
- Born: P. F. Strawson, English philosopher, known for his work in analytic philosophy, author of The Bounds of Sense; as Peter Frederick Strawson, in Ealing, England (d. 2006)
- Died: Henry Gantt, 58, American engineer, creator of the Gantt chart (b. 1861)

== November 24, 1919 (Monday) ==
- Born: David Kossoff, English actor, best known for film roles in The Young Lovers, The Mouse That Roared, and The Mouse on the Moon; in Hackney, London, England (d. 2006)

== November 25, 1919 (Tuesday) ==
- Felipe Ángeles, one of the top generals for Pancho Villa, was sentenced to death for his opposition for the Venustiano Carranza government in Chihuahua City, Mexico.

== November 26, 1919 (Wednesday) ==
- Felipe Ángeles, former top general for Pancho Villa, was executed in front of the state penitentiary in Chihuahua City, Mexico.
- Born:
  - Ryszard Kaczorowski, Polish state leader, 6th President of Poland (in exile); in Białystok, Poland (d. 2010)
  - Frederik Pohl, American science fiction writer, best known for the Heechee series starting with Gateway; in New York City, United States (d. 2013)

== November 27, 1919 (Thursday) ==
- The Treaty of Neuilly-sur-Seine was signed between the Allies and Bulgaria.
- The National Democratic Hungarian-Szekler Party officially formed in Bucharest even though it had been active since early 1919, and winning seats in the general election earlier in November.
- Mormon president Heber J. Grant officially dedicated the opening of the Laie Hawaii Mormon Temple in Lāʻie, Hawaii.
- The fraternity Kappa Kappa Psi was founded at Oklahoma A&M College, with William A. Scroggs as the first president.
- Pentax was founded as Asahi, manufacturer of spectacle lens in Toshima, Japan. It expanded to other optical products such as binocular and camera lens in the 1930s. The company merged with the Hoya Corporation in 2006.

== November 28, 1919 (Friday) ==
- The dance and concert hall Hammersmith Palais opened in London, becoming a major jazz music venue starting with performances by the Original Dixieland Jazz Band.
- Sports organization Der Club an der Alster was established in Hamburg, where it became known for its tennis and field hockey programs.
- Born: Keith Miller, Australian cricketer, all-rounder for the Australia national cricket team from 1946 to 1956; in Sunshine, Victoria, Australia (d. 2004)

== November 29, 1919 (Saturday) ==
- The Great Theatre opened in Berlin.
- Born:
  - Pearl Primus, Trinidadian-American dancer and choreographer, best known for introducing African dance in the United States through the New Dance Group; in Port of Spain, Trinidad and Tobago (d. 1994)
  - Joe Weider, Canadian sports executive, co-founder of the International Fitness and Bodybuilding Federation, and the Mr. Olympia and Ms. Olympia competitions; in Montreal, Canada (d. 2013)

== November 30, 1919 (Sunday) ==
- Health officials officially declared the global Spanish flu pandemic over after new cases dropped off dramatically following November 11.
- The conservative National Bloc won the 53% of the vote in the first legislative elections since the end of World War I, the largest victory for the French conservative vote until 1968.
- Pope Benedict released an ecclesiastical letter titled Maximum illud (That Momentous) which identified the principles and priorities of the Catholic missions, one of the first of five letters concerning the Catholic Church's missionary work from 1919 to 1959.
- Busline CTM began operations in Casablanca, the oldest operating transport company in Morocco.
- Born: Milton A. Rothman, American physicist, co-founder of the Philadelphia Science Fiction Society; in Philadelphia, United States (d. 2001)
- Died: John T. Arundel, 78, English industrialist, developer of the mining industry on the Pacific Islands (b. 1841)
