= Maltesholm Castle =

Manor house in Scania, Sweden

- Maltesholms slott
- Kristianstad Municipality
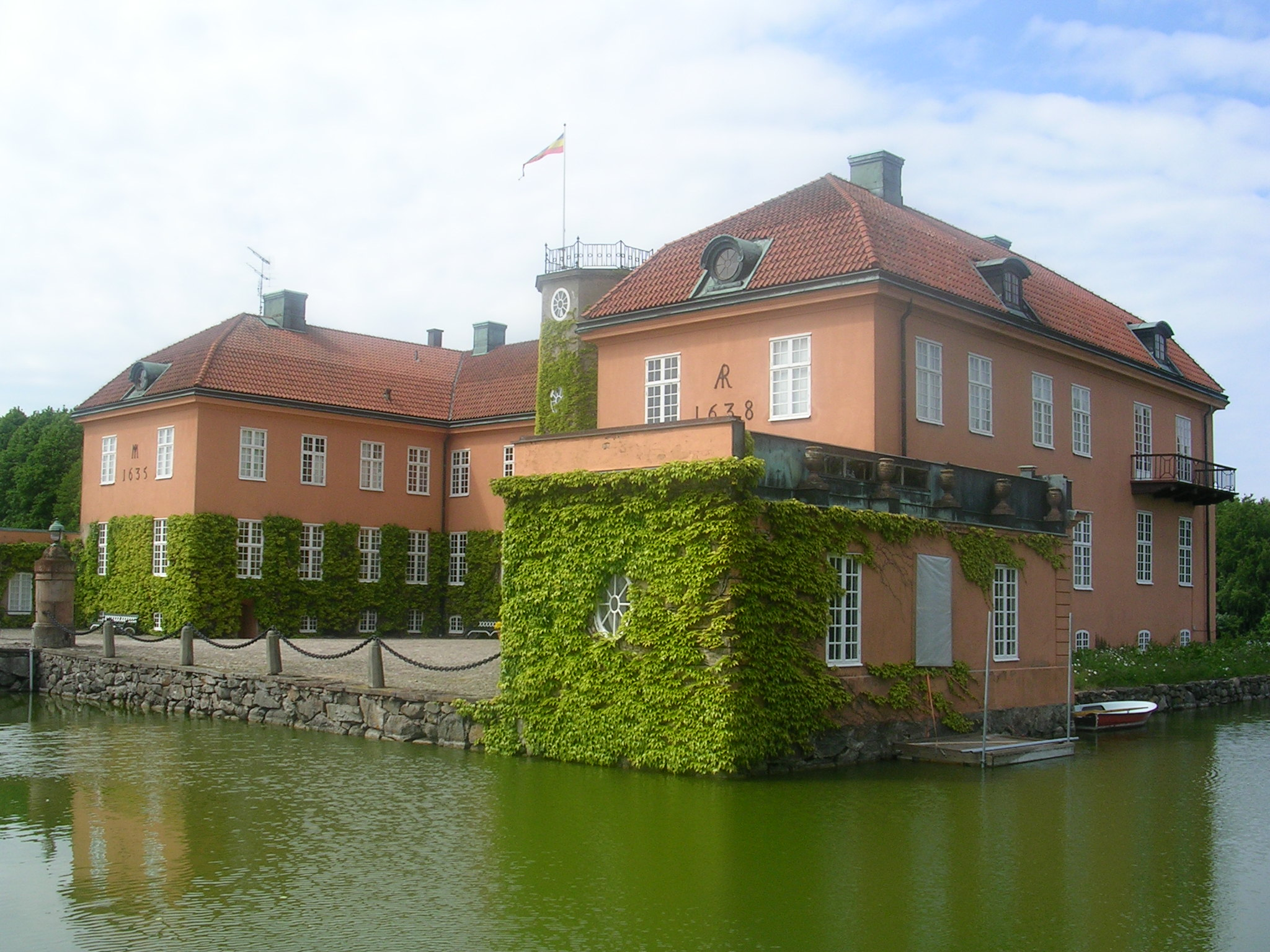
- Maltesholm Castle

Site information
- Type: Castle
- Open to the public: No

Location
- Scania, Sweden
- Location within Skåne Location within Sweden
- Coordinates: 55.9022°N 13.9809°E

Site history
- Built: 1780; 246 years ago

Maltesholm Castle (Swedish: Maltesholms slott) is a large manor house located at Sönnarslöv in Kristianstad Municipality in Scania, Sweden.

== History ==
The history of the estate goes back to the Middle Ages and it was owned by the Brahe family during the Danish rule of Scania. The castle was originally constructed between 1635 and 1638 by the high constable of Kristianstad, Malte Juel, (ca 1460–1507). Typical for its time, the castle was a Renaissance manor built in brick with three floors, a staircase tower with an elaborate spire, two crow-stepped gables and surrounded by a large moat.

During the life of Malte Ramel (1684–1752) the domains were greatly expanded. Malte Ramel was one of the richest men in Scania of the time, holding tile to the estates at Löberöd, Västerstad, Hviderup and Sireköpinge as well as Maltesholm.

His son Hans Ramel (1724-1799) began reconstructing the castle according to the style of the late 18th century. It was completed in 1780 in the style of Swedish classical palace; the only remains of the Renaissance castle are the moat and the year "1680" marked on the facade. Hans Ramel also constructed a 1.3 kilometres (0.81 mi) long stone road leading up to the Mansion through the undulating landscape. The road had to be even and it took almost 50 years to complete.

In 1800 the castle passed to Axel Gabriel De la Gardie (1772-1838), governor of Kristianstad County, who was married to Christina Gustava Ramel (1783-1819) and remained in the De la Gardie family ownership for over 100 years. In 1933, the estate passed by inheritance to the baronial family Palmstierna. The estate has been passed down for generations and is now the private residence of the Baron Palmstierna.

== Gardens ==
In the renaissance garden stands a douglas fir which measures 35 metres (115 ft) tall and is over 200 years old. There is also a gazebo by the classical Swedish architect Carl Hårleman (1700–1753). The beautiful garden is open to the public.

== Östra Sönnarslöv Church ==
A few kilometers southeast of the estate is Östra Sönnarslöv Church (Östra Sönnarslövs kyrka) of Degeberga-Everöd parish in the Diocese of Lund. The oldest parts of the church date from the 12th century. It is decorated with frescoes commonly attributed to Nils Håkansson (Vittskövlemästaren) and were made during the latter part of the 15th century, probably in the 1460s. Ramel crypt contains three stone sarcophagi with the ashes of Malte Ramel and both his wives.

== Other sources ==
- (in Swedish) Maltesholms slott
