= Alice Gerstenberg =

American dramatist

Alice Erya Gerstenberg
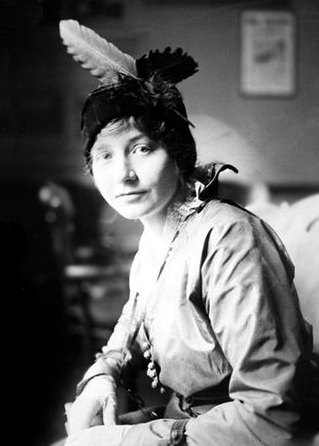
- Born: Alice Erya Gerstenberg; August 2, 1885; Chicago, Illinois
- Died: July 28, 1972 (aged 86); Chicago, Illinois
- Education: Bryn Mawr College
- Occupations: Playwright; novelist; actress
- Awards: Chicago Foundation for Literature Award (1938)

Alice Erya Gerstenberg (August 2, 1885 – July 28, 1972) was an American playwright, actress, and activist best known for her experimental, feminist drama and her involvement with the Little Theatre Movement in Chicago.

== Early life ==
Gerstenberg was born in Chicago, Illinois, the only child of Julia and Erich Gerstenberg, a successful grain merchant. Gerstenberg's grandfather was a founder and member of the Chicago Board of Trade in 1848, a position Gerstenberg's father inherited later. The Gerstenbergs enjoyed a higher standard of living than most middle-class families in Chicago at the time.

Gerstenberg had ample travel experiences and social indulgences including commercial theater. She attended a private school in Chicago and graduated from Bryn Mawr College in 1907. After college, she spent some time in New York watching the rehearsals of David Belasco and taking classes at Anna Morgan's studio in 1908.

== Career ==
After living in New York for a period, Gerstenberg returned to Chicago, where she continued to write plays; became involved with the Little Theatre movement, supported her parents, and exercised a strong feminist dedication to bringing non-commercial theater to new playwrights, children, and Chicagoans. Her previous involvement with the theater during her childhood, the plays she wrote at college, as well as the time spent in New York led her to continue writing plays for the rest of her life, working occasionally as an actress, and maintaining an activist role in the theater. Overtones has continued to be produced since its publication in 1913. In the 1950's Alice was credited with portraying a subconscious self on stage in a theatrical manner.

=== Themes and plays ===
Alice Gerstenberg wrote her first full length play The Conscience of Sarah Platt. In 1912, her comedy Captain Jack was performed by students of the Academy of Dramatic Arts in New York. That same year, her novel Unquenched Fire was printed. In 1915, Gerstenberg wrote an adaptation of Lewis Carroll's Alice in Wonderland that later became popular with little theaters across the country. At this time, Gerstenberg also wrote Overtones, a one-act play, her second stage play, and her most frequently performed and printed, which was first produced in November 1915 by the Washington Square Players at the Bandbox Theater in New York. It has been anthologized alongside Susan Glaspell’s Trifles as classic examples of modern one-act plays by women involved in the little theater movement. The play, which combines experimental form with conventional dramatic conflict, enjoyed many productions due to its innovative use of the split subject, a technique Eugene O'Neill would later use in his play Strange Interlude. Gerstenberg continued to write many one-act plays early on in her career, many of which were performed by regional or little theaters in and around Chicago. The majority of these plays demonstrate her feminist tendencies – critiquing the social roles and decision which constrained women of the time.

Gerstenberg collaborated with another Chicago local woman named Herma Naomi Clark in writing a drama titled "When Chicago Was Young." The play was presented at the Goodman Theater for three weeks in 1933. It has since been rewritten under the title "Port of Chicago." Clark and Gerstenberg also co-wrote a one-act play for women entitled "Shall Women Vote?," which is considered a manuscript/speech and now belongs to the Chicago History Museum. Gerstenberg continued to write plays throughout her life, later on publishing several radio plays as well as several commissioned dramatizations of children's stories. In 1921 Gerstenberg published a compilation of plays titled Ten-One Act Plays that includes her popular piece Overtones As well as Four Plays for Four Women published a few years later in 1924.

=== Regional theater and the Little Theater Movement ===
Gerstenberg played a crucial role in the foundation and success of several theater companies as well as the Little Theater Movement in Chicago. In 1921, she founded the Junior League Children's Theater in Chicago; in 1922 she founded the Playwrights Theater; and she supported an amateur theater company that was eventually named for her at its foundation in 1955.

Gerstenberg was one of a handful of women invited to speak at the National Drama Council and National Theatre Conference. In 1936 she was an invited speaker at three AETA conferences and she won the Chicago Foundation for Literature Award in 1938.

Gerstenberg had many opportunities to move to New York, but instead chose to remain in Chicago.

== Plays and novels ==
Plays

- A Small World (1908)
- Overtones (1913), one-act edition
- Alice in Wonderland (1915), dramatization of Lewis Carroll's Alice's Adventures in Wonderland and Through the Looking Glass
- The Buffer (1916)
- Beyond (1917)
- Hearts (1917)
- Attuned (1918)
- The Unseen (1918)
- Illuminati in Drama Libre (1919)
- He Said and She Said (1919) - One-act comedy of gossip.
- Fourteen (1920)
- Ten One-Act Plays (1921)
- The Pot Boiler or The Dress Rehearsal (1923)
- Four Plays for Women (1924)
- Mah-Johngg (1924)
- Their Husband (1924)
- Ever Young (1924)
- Seaweed (1924)
- At the Club (1925)
- The Land of "Don’t Want To" (1928), dramatization of Lilian Bell's children's story

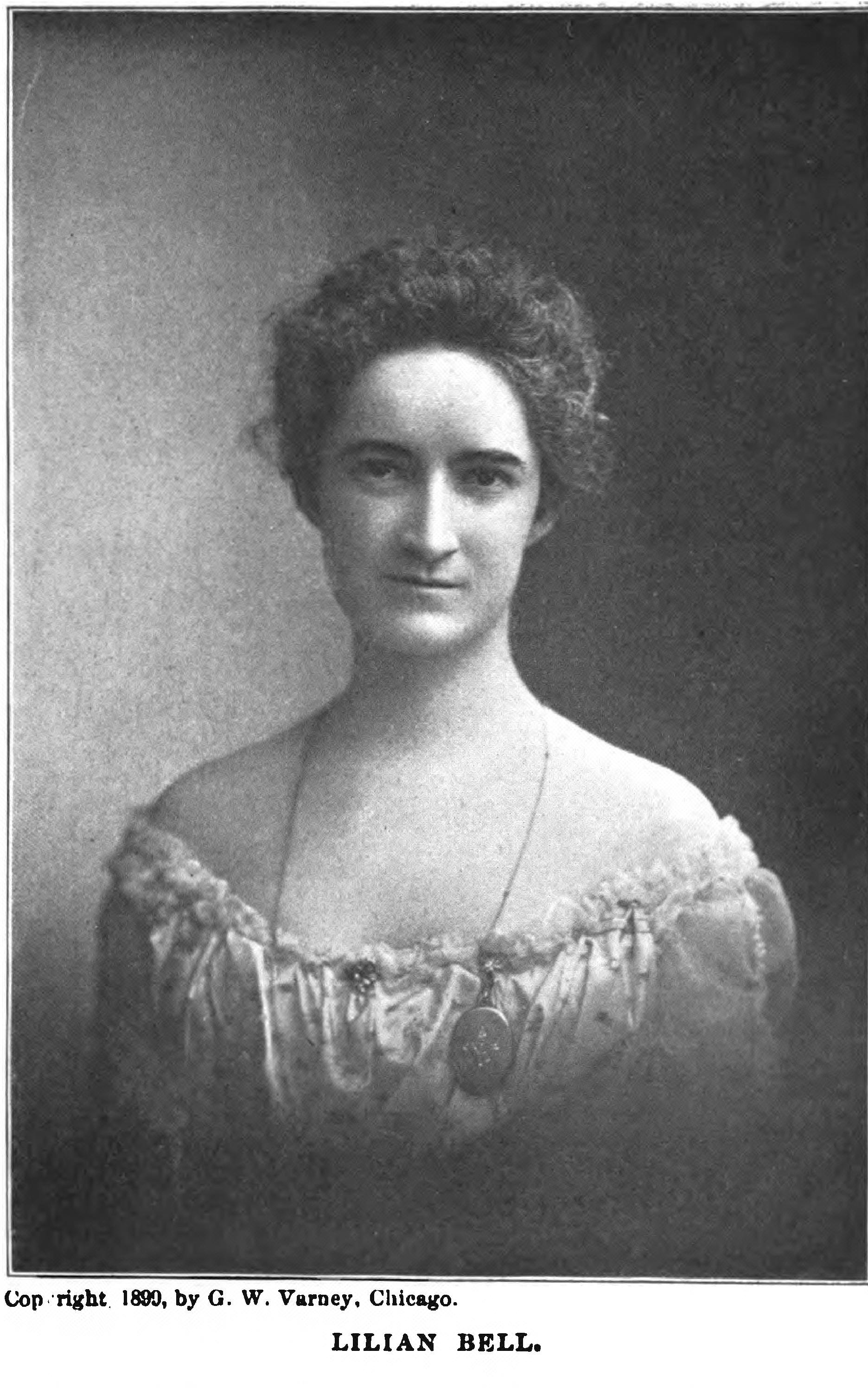
Lilian Bell

- Overtones (1929), three act edition
- Comedies All (1930)
- The Water Babies (1930), dramatization of Charles Kingsley's work
- Sentience (1933)
- Glee Plays the Game (1934)
- Within the Hour (1934)
- Across the River (1939), radio play
- Lake Front (1939), radio play
- Time for Romance (1940)
- Got Your Number (1942, unpublished)
- ‘’Victory Belles ‘’ (play) 1944)
- On the Beam (1963, unpublished)
- Time for Living (1969)
- Concordia (Unpublished, n.d.)
- Port of Chicago (Unpublished, n.d.)
- The Hourglass (n.d.)

Novels

- Unquenched Fire (1912)
- The Conscience of Sarah Platt (1915)

== Legacy ==
Gerstenberg's play Overtones, her most frequently performed and printed work, was adapted into the chamber opera The Clever Artifice of Harriet and Margaret in 2013 by composer-librettist Leanna Kirchoff. The opera won the National Opera Association's 2014-2016 Chamber Opera Composition Competition, and was given its professional premiere by Really Spicy Opera at the Minnesota Fringe Festival in 2015. The opera was later staged by the National Opera Association and Gateway Opera in 2016.
