= Sophia Tolstaya =

Russian diarist and copyist (1844–1919)

- Софья Толстая
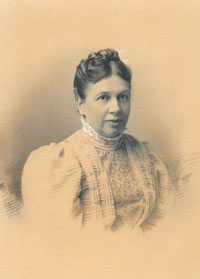
- Born: Sophia Andreyevna Behrs; 22 August 1844; Pokrovskoye-Streshnevo, Russia
- Died: 4 November 1919 (aged 75); Yasnaya Polyana, Russia
- Other names: Sophia Tolstoy, Sonya Tolstoy, Sofia Tolstoy
- Occupations: Diarist; copyist
- Spouse: Leo Tolstoy (m. 1862; died 1910)
- Children: 13

Countess Sophia Andreyevna Tolstaya (Note: In this name that follows East Slavic naming customs, the patronymic is Andreyevna and the family name is Tolstaya.) (Note: Russian: Софья Андреевна Толстая, IPA: [ˈsofʲjə ɐnˈdrʲe(j)ɪvnə tɐlˈstəjə].) (née Behrs; (Note: Russian: Берс, IPA: [bʲers].) 3 September [O.S. 22 August] 1844 – 4 November 1919), sometimes anglicised as Sofia Tolstoy, Sophia Tolstoy, and Sonya Tolstoy, was a Russian diarist, and the wife of writer Leo Tolstoy.

== Biography ==
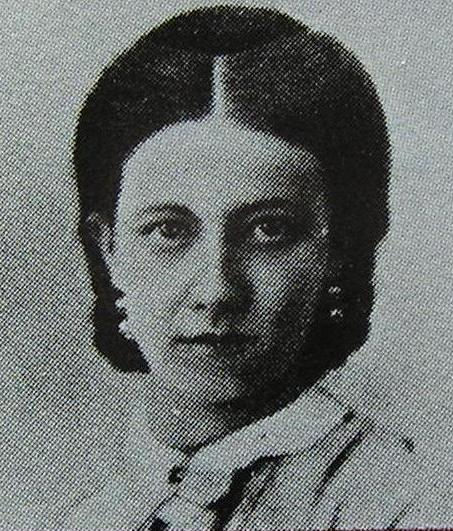
Countess Sophia Andreyevna Tolstaya in 1862

Sophia Behrs was one of three daughters of a Baltic-German, Dr. Andrey Evstafievich Behrs (1808–1868), Imperial court physician, and his Russian wife, Liubov Alexandrovna Islavinа (1826–1886). The Behrs family entered the hereditary Russian nobility through Sophia's father, whose service as an Imperial Court Physician earned him the civilian rank of State Councillor under the Table of Ranks. The family enjoyed high social standing in Moscow; her father's position granted them a residence inside the Moscow Kremlin, where they hosted a prominent cultural salon frequented by the members of the Russian aristocracy and intelligentsia.

Her maternal great-grandfather, Count Pyotr Zavadovsky, was the first Minister of education in Russia's history and a favourite of Catherine the Great. Sophia had been acquainted with her future husband, Leo Tolstoy, from childhood; he was 16 years her senior and had befriended her mother when he was a boy. On 17 September 1862, when Sophia was 18 years old, the couple became formally engaged after Tolstoy gave Sophia a written proposal of marriage, marrying a week later in Moscow. At the time of their marriage, Leo Tolstoy was well known as a novelist following the publication of The Cossacks. On the eve of their wedding, Tolstoy gave Sophia his diaries that detailed his sexual relations with female servants. (In Anna Karenina, 34-year-old Konstantin Levin, a semi-autobiographical character, behaves similarly, asking his 19-year-old fiancée Kitty to read his diaries and learn of his past transgressions.) The diaries included the fact that Tolstoy had fathered a child by a woman who remained on the Yasnaya Polyana estate.

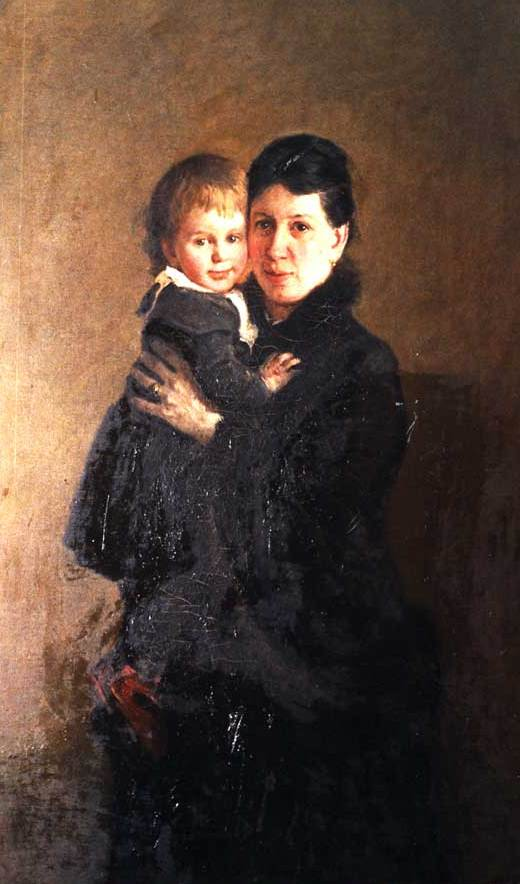
Sophia Tolstaya and daughter Alexandra Tolstaya

Tolstaya was pregnant 16 times; three of her pregnancies ended in miscarriages. The Tolstoys had 13 children, eight of whom survived childhood. With the growing interest of her husband in spiritual matters, Tolstaya took over the running of the family estate. Sophia acted as copyist of War and Peace, copying and editing the manuscript seven times from beginning to end at home at night by candlelight after the children and servants had gone to bed, using an inkwell pen and sometimes requiring a magnifying glass to read her husband's notes.

In 1887, Tolstaya regained interest in the relatively new art of photography, which she had learned at age 16. She took over 1,000 photographs that documented her life and the decline of the Russian Empire. She was a diarist and recorded her life with Leo Tolstoy in a series of diaries which were published in English translation in the 1980s. Tolstaya wrote her memoirs as well, which she titled My Life.

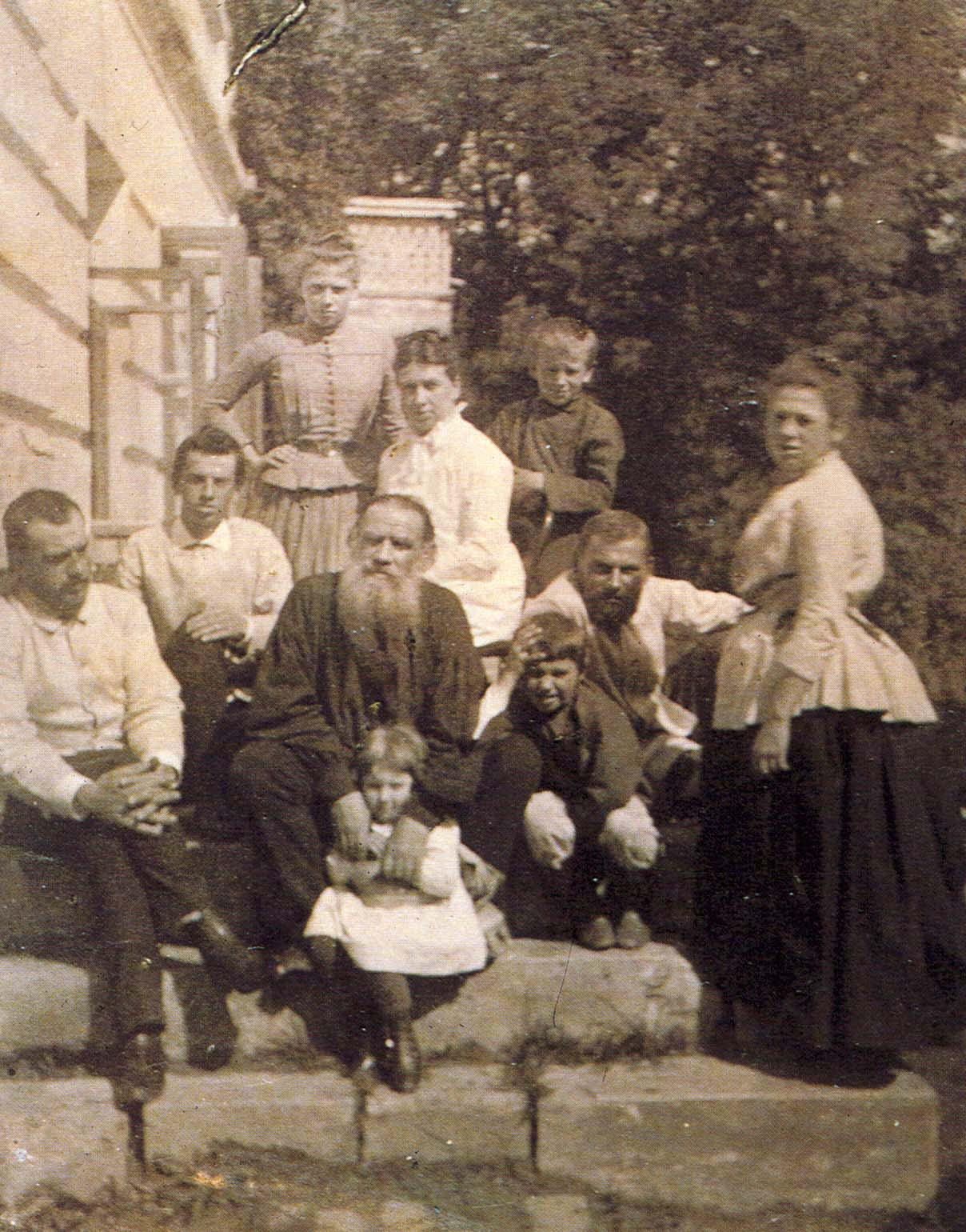
Family of Leo Tolstoy, Yasnaya Polyana, 1887

The marriage of Tolstaya and Leo Tolstoy is considered one of the famously unhappy marriages of literary history. Their children took sides in the marital discord. Their daughter Alexandra supported her father, whereas their son Leo Junior favoured his mother. Tolstaya struggled with her husband's increasing devotion to spiritual matters and his neglect of their family life. The couple argued over Tolstoy's desire to give away all his private property. In 1910, at the age of 82, Leo Tolstoy abruptly left Sophia, accompanied by their daughter Alexandra and his doctor, Dushan Makovicki (Dušan Makovický). Leo left out of anger after he overheard Sophia searching his study for his will, which she was concerned he wanted to change. He died 10 days later in the hamlet of Astapavo. Sophia was kept away from him (as depicted in the film The Last Station). Following the death of her husband, Sophia continued to live in Yasnaya Polyana and survived the Russian Revolution in relative peace. She died on 4 November 1919.

== Controversy related to Leo Tolstoy's The Kreutzer Sonata ==
In 1889, Leo Tolstoy published his book The Kreutzer Sonata. The book advocated sexual abstinence. Its narrator murders his wife in a fit of jealousy. Although quickly banned from publication by censorship, the novel had been assumed in the Russian society to be describing the unhappy marriage of Leo Tolstoy and Tolstaya, which greatly offended Tolstaya. Tolstaya wrote two novellas as a response to The Kreutzer Sonata, which both remained unpublished until 2000. The two novellas are Whose Fault? written between 1891 and 1894 and Song Without Words written in 1898. In both, the character of the husband is portrayed as a man insensitive to the needs of his wife. Despite her objections to The Kreutzer Sonata, Tolstaya helped lift the ban on the publication of the novel. She obtained an audience with Tsar Alexander III in 1891, who accepted that the novel be included in a broader publication of Leo Tolstoy's books.

== In popular culture ==
Tolstaya was portrayed by Helen Mirren in the 2009 movie The Last Station, based on the 1990 biographical novel of the same name by Jay Parini, and Leo Tolstoy was portrayed by Christopher Plummer. Both actors were nominated for Academy Awards in their respective categories. Her life was also serialised in August 2010 by BBC's Radio 4 with the title A Simple Life. In 2022, Tolstaya was the main character of the film A Couple by Frederick Wiseman. French actress Nathalie Boutefeu is cast as Tolstaya in the film, which consists of monologues based on Tolstaya's diaries.

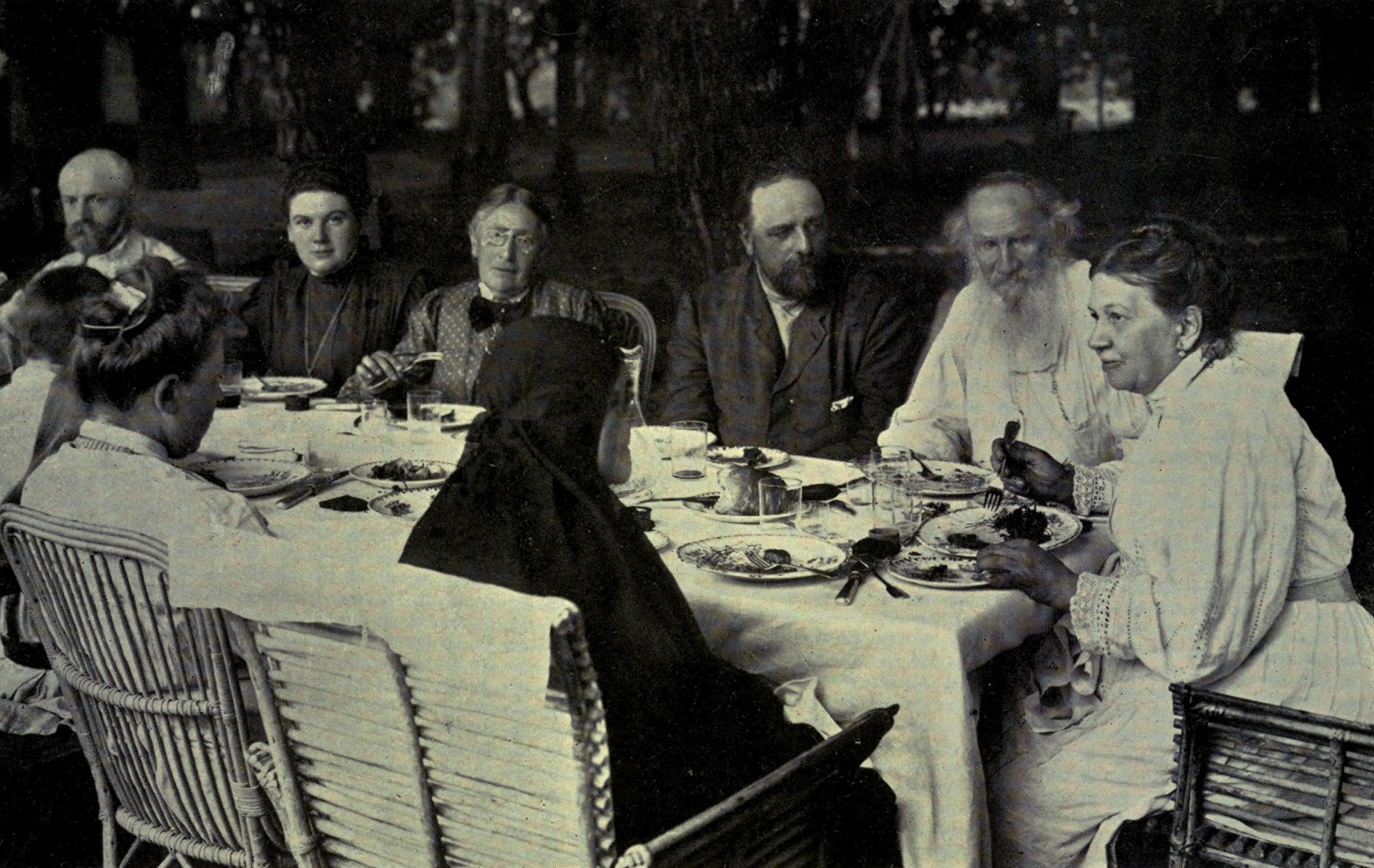
The family circle at Yasnaya Polyana (c. 1905).

== Works ==
Many of Tolstaya's works were published postmortem, long after being written. This is because Tolstaya was critical of Leo Tolstoy in her writing and the Russian authorities did not want the status of the famous author tarnished. Some of her literary work was published more than a century after she wrote it.

=== List of publications ===
- The Countess Tolstoy's Later Diary 1891-1897 London, Victor Gollancz, 1929; translated by Alexander Werth
- Autobiography of Sophie Andreevna Tolstoi online at archive.org
- The Memoirs of Sofia Tolstoy, which she titled My Life – at University of Ottawa Press
- Whose Fault? (Russian: Чья вина?), Oktyabr 1994/10, 6-59. German Translation: Eine Frage der Schuld, Zürich 2008. English translation: Sophia Tolstoy's rebuttal of her husband Leo's accusations, The Edwin Mellen Press, New York 2010
- Song without Words (Russian: Песня без слов), unpublished in Russia. German Translation: Lied ohne Worte, Zürich 2010.
- Michael Katz (ed. and trans.), The Kreutzer Sonata Variations (New Haven: Yale University Press, 2014). Includes Tolstaya's "Whose Fault?" and "Song Without Words" as well as excerpts from her diary and My Life. Leo Tolstoy's story "The Kreutzer Sonata," Leo and Sofia's son Lev Lvovich Tolstoy's story "Chopin's Prelude," and other related writings by Leo, Lev Lvovich, and the Tolstoys' daughter Alexandra Lvovna appear in the same volume.
- Cathy Porter (trans.), The Diaries of Sophia Tolstoy (London: HarperCollins, 2010).
