= Tin Ka Ping Foundation =

Chinese charitable organization

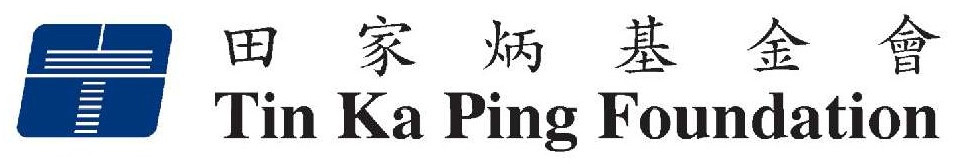

The Tin Ka Ping Foundation is a non-profit charitable organisation founded in 1982 by Dr. Tin Ka Ping in Hong Kong. It has supported more than a thousand charitable projects in Hong Kong, Mainland China, and Taiwan, encompassing areas such as education, medical, hygiene, entertainment, infrastructures, culture and social welfare. Donations made by the Foundation have exceeded a billion Hong Kong dollars and hundreds of facilities and buildings.

In Hong Kong, the foundation has made numerous generous donations to fund scholarships, research grants and building improvements to tertiary institutions. More than 20 primary and secondary schools, kindergartens and elderly and youth care centres are named after Dr. Tin.

In Mainland China, the foundation has provided funding to more than 90 tertiary institutions, 166 secondary schools, more than 40 primary schools and kindergartens, about 20 colleges, over 1650 suburban libraries and around 30 hospitals and sanatoria across 34 provinces, municipalities and autonomous regions.

In addition, "Tin Ka Ping Foundation" has contributed 29 hospitals, 130 bridges and roads, and 200 other livelihood projects.

Founder Tin Ka-ping died in July 2018 at age 99 at his home in Hong Kong. He was awarded an MBE in 1996 by Queen Elizabeth II, and the Grand Bauhinia Medal in 2010.

== Mission ==
In 2009, the foundation" was re-organized by developing a new mission. The objectives of the Foundation are to comfort the elderly and assist the young, to build schools and promote education in enhancing and promoting culture, to contribute to the welfare of fellow-citizens, and to contribute to the community and the country.

== History ==
- In 1982, the founder of "Tin Ka Ping Foundation" has registered "TKP Foundation" as a non-profit charitable organisation, donating in charitable projects, especially in the area of education. It is managed by Dr. Tin Ka Ping and his companies without raising fund from any third party.
- In 1983, "Po Leung Kuk Tin Ka Ping Kindergarten" was established as the first school named after "Tin Ka Ping" .
- In 1984, "Guangdong Province Da Bu County Tin Ka Ping No.1 Secondary School" was established.
- In 1987, donation was contributed to build "Yan Oi Tong Tin Ka Ping Secondary School".
- In 1994, with Hong Kong SAR Government's approval, the Foundation was able to run a new school, named "Tin Ka Ping Secondary School" in Fanling, Hong Kong.
- In 2001, Tin sold his home in Kowloon Tong for HK$56 million to provide more funding for the foundation.
- In 2009, Dr. Tin donated Tins Centre, which consists of four industrial buildings, to "Tin Ka Ping Foundation". He invited the heads/presidents of nine universities in Hong Kong together with community leaders in the society to participate in the governance of the Foundation without the control of Tin's family members, hence enabling the Foundation to become a public non-profit charitable organisation.
- In 2011, Tin earmarked a further $257 million of his assets for future projects of the foundation.
- In 2012, the 30th anniversary of the foundation was celebrated with The Hong Kong Institute of Education. The Foundation invited university presidents from Mainland China, Taiwan, and Hong Kong, scholars, and project leaders in Tin Ka Ping schools to map out a blueprint for the development of education.

== Schools and Colleges ==
- Hong Kong
- Tin Ka Ping Secondary School
- Yan Oi Tong Tin Ka Ping Secondary School
- Yan Oi Tong Tin Ka Ping Primary School
- Po Leung Kuk Tin Ka Ping Primary School
- Po Leung Kuk Tin Ka Ping Millennium Primary School
- The Salvation Army Tin Ka Ping School
- China
- list of Tin Ka Ping Secondary Schools
- Taiwan
- National Chiao Tung University, Tin Ka-Ping Photonic Building
- National Taiwan Normal University, Tin Ka Ping Academy
- Macau
  - University of Macau, Tin Ka Ping Institute of Educational Research
