= My Life, Sofia Andreevna Tolstaya =

Published memoirs of Sofia Tolstaya

My Life is the published memoirs of Sofia Andreevna Tolstaya (Sofia Tolstaya), the wife of Leo Tolstoy. Her manuscript lay dormant for almost a century.

Historically, little attention has been paid to Sofia who, acting in the capacity of literary assistant, translator, transcriber, and editor, played an important role in the development of her husband's career.

Tolstaya's story takes us from her childhood through the early years of her marriage, the writing of War and Peace and Anna Karenina and into the first year of the twentieth century. She paints an intimate and honest portrait of her husband's character, providing new details about his life to which she alone was privy. She offers a better understanding of Tolstoy's character, his qualities and failings as a husband and a father, and forms a picture of the quintessential Tolstoyan character which underlies his fiction.

My Life also reveals that Tolstaya was an accomplished author in her own right—as well as a translator, amateur artist, musician, photographer, and businesswoman—a rarity in the largely male-dominated world of the time. She was actively involved in the relief efforts for the 1891–92 famine and the emigration of the Doukhobors in 1899. She was a prolific correspondent, in touch with many prominent figures in Russian and Western society. Guests in her home ranged from peasants to princes, from anarchists to artists, from composers to philosophers. Her descriptions of these personalities read as a chronicle of the times, affording a unique portrait of late-19th- and early-20th-century Russian society, ranging from peasants to the Tsar himself.

My Life is the most important primary document about Tolstoy to be published in many years and a unique and intimate portrait of one of the greatest literary minds of all time.
