= Lilian Bell =

American novelist, travel writer

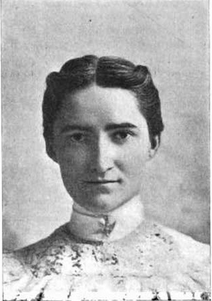
- Born: Lilian Lida Bell; 1867; Chicago, Illinois, U.S.
- Died: 1929 (aged 61–62)
- Occupations: Novelist, travel writer
- Spouse: Arthur Hoyt Bogue (m. 1900)
- Writing career
- Pen name: Mrs. Arthur Hoyt Bogue
- Language: English

Signature
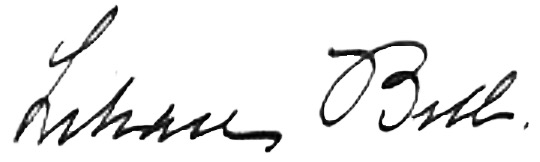

Lilian Lida Bell (pen name, Mrs. Arthur Hoyt Bogue; 1867–1929) was an American novelist and travel writer. Her works included At Home with Jardines, Hope Loring, Abroad with the Jimmies, The Interference of Patricia, A Book of Girls, and The Lilian Bell Birthday Book. In addition to her novels, Bell was a travel writer.

== Early years ==
Lilian Lida Bell was born in Chicago, Illinois in 1867, but she was brought up in Atlanta, Georgia. She graduated from Dearborn Seminary, Chicago. Her father, Maj. William W. Bell, served during the American Civil War, and so did her grandfather, Gen. Joseph Warren Bell, who, though a Southerner, sold and freed his slaves before the war, brought his family North, and organized the 13th Illinois Cavalry. Among the Virginian patriots at the time of the American Revolution was her great-great-grandfather, Captain Thomas Bell.

She began writing when only a child of eight, and kept it up until, at 15, it occurred to her to have something published. Her first attempts were all successful, and encouraged by this fact, she wrote freely for several years. On being questioned by a judicious literary friend, and telling him that all of her work found a ready acceptance, he exclaimed: "The very worst thing that could happen to a girl like you!" Much puzzled, she pondered over this extraordinary statement, until, divining his meaning, she stopped all of her newspaper work, — no small sacrifice to a young girl, whose delight in her own income was only natural, — and began to study style, to read, to write, to work with only that end in view.

== Career ==
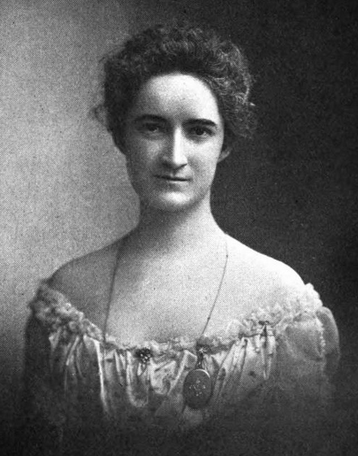
Photo of Bell (1902)

Her first book of fiction was "The Love Affairs of an Old Maid", which captured the reading world. Shortly after its appearance, she received by express a beautiful marquise ring, consisting of a gorgeous sapphire surrounded by diamonds. The only inscription upon it was " To the Author of 'The Love Affairs of an Old Maid.'" It had been sent to her publishers, and by them forwarded to her, and she never learned who was the generous donor.

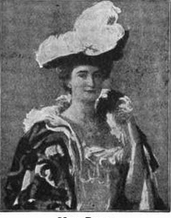
Photo of Bell (1905)

Her mother was her severest critic and her greatest help. Bell attributed the gentle criticism of the public largely to the fact of her mother's unfailing good taste and remorseless critical sense in going over her manuscripts, and was very grateful to the mother for the patience required in this trying ordeal. She said of her: "She is descended not only from the Puritans, but straight from Plymouth Rock." When asked if she did not dread the launching of her new book, "The Under Side of Things," Bell replied: "What have I to fear from the public? Mamma has read it." That she is one of the most successful women writers of the day was demonstrated by the instant acceptance of everything she offered, both in the U.S. and in England. Her English publishers cabled their acceptance of her new book before they had read the manuscript.

Bell went to Europe for the purpose of "copy," and thereafter wrote, The Expatriates (1902), a story of the American colony in Paris—of the life where the Faubourg Saint-Germain and the Arc de Triomphe meet. Bell understood types, although at times she was prone to exaggeration. She also saw clearly through patriotic eyes the faults of her own countrymen and countrywomen, and wrote of them with frankness. With an appreciation of what is dramatic material, Bell seized upon the notorious fire at the Bazar de la Charité for the opening chapter of her story. This may have been the first time that the frightful catastrophe of the Rue Jean-Goujon was brought into fiction; and in The Expatriates, the event and the grim irony attendant upon it were treated with tragic power.

== Personal life ==
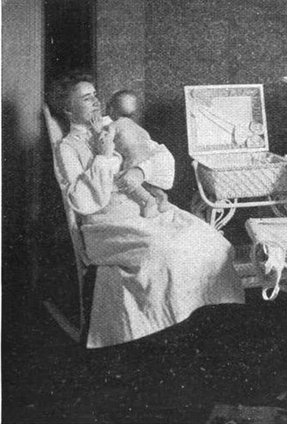
Photo of Bell with daughter (1904)

In May 1900, she married Arthur Hoyt Bogue of Chicago, and they resided in Applethorpe, Tarrytown-on-Hudson, New York. Bell had a deeply religious side to her nature, and was a devout church-goer. She loved to study moral philosophy, of which she said: "I crave the Bible just as keenly as I crave to dance, and I could get along without the latter much better than I could without the former." The daily reading of the Bible was a life habit.

== Selected works ==
- The love affairs of an old maid, 1893
- A little sister to the wilderness, 1895
- The under side of things : a novel, 1896
- From a Girl's Point of View, 1897
- The instinct of step-fatherhood, 1898
- As seen by me, 1900
- The golden ship and other tales, 1900
- Sir John and the American girl, 1901
- Abroad with the Jimmies, 1902
- The Expatriates. A novel, 1902
- The interference of Patricia, 1903
- A book of girls, 1903
- Hope Loring, 1904
- Why men remain bachelors : and other luxuries, 1906
- Carolina Lee, 1906
- The concentrations of Bee, 1909
- Angela's quest, 1910
- The runaway equator : and the strange adventures of a little boy in pursuit of it, 1911
- The Story of the Christmas Ship, 1915
- About Miss Mattie Morningglory, 1916
- The land of Don't-want-to, a play in three acts, 1928
