= Sireköpinge Church =

Medieval Lutheran church in Scania, Sweden

Coordinates: 55°55′40″N 12°59′42″E

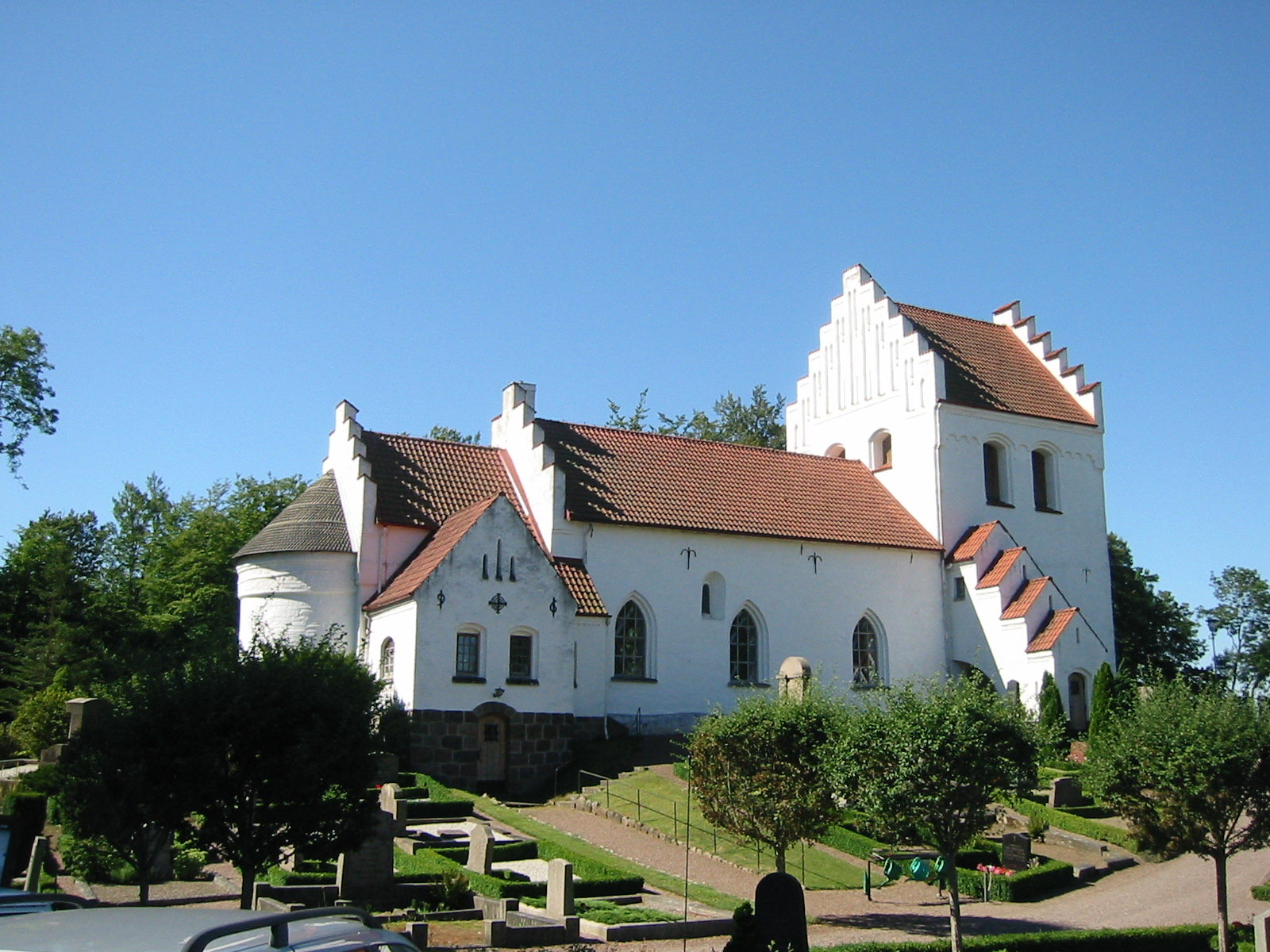
Sireköpinge Church, external view

Sireköpinge Church (Swedish: Sireköpinge kyrka) is a medieval Lutheran church east of Landskrona in the province of Scania, Sweden. It belongs to the Diocese of Lund.

== History and architecture ==
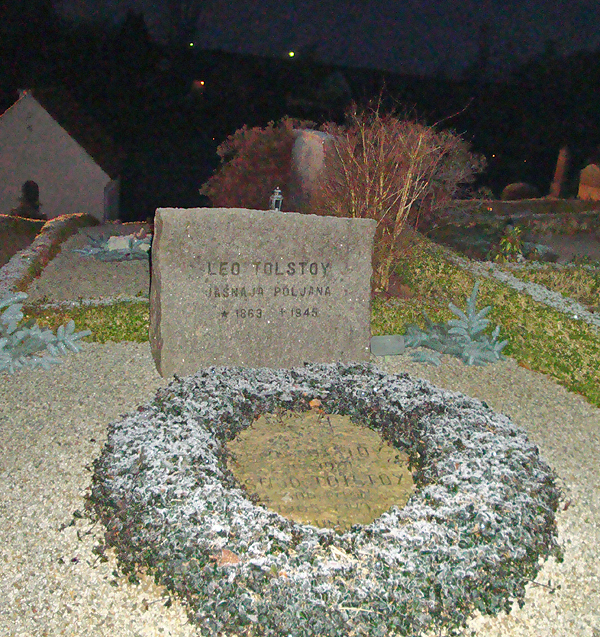
The grave of Lev Lvovich Tolstoy in the church cemetery

Sireköpinge Church is one of the oldest in the province of Scania. Its oldest parts, the apse and choir, were built during the later part of the 12th century, by the Order of Saint John and dedicated to the Order's patron saint. The nave was rebuilt during the 15th century into its present shape. During the same century, the original wooden ceiling was also replaced with the current, star-shaped vaults. The lower parts of the tower were furthermore added during the 15th century, but proved too weak to support a tower. A wooden spire was instead built on the tower at a later point, and only during a renovation of the church in 1915–17 was the tower raised to its current height. The sacristy of the church was also built during the same time, and serves as a support for the northern wall of the choir. The church was renovated again in 1991.

The building material of the church is mainly grey sandstone, used exclusively in the choir and apse. In the nave, blocks of sandstone have been mixed with blocks of granite. The church exterior is whitewashed, and the tower and other gables decorated with crow-stepped gables.

Internally, the church is decorated with fragmentary Romanesque murals, as well as better-preserved murals dating from the 14th century. The murals, which depict saints, the four evangelists and the devil, are located mainly in the choir. They were restored during the 1991 renovation. Among the furnishings, a decorated iron chandelier dates from the 14th century; it is one of only four chandeliers of its kind in Sweden. The chandelier was exhibited at the International Exposition of 1867 in Paris as well as at the Baltic Exhibition of 1914 in Malmö. The crucifix of the church is a copy of the original (13th century) which is now in the Lund University Historical Museum in Lund.

In the church cemetery lies the grave of Lev Lvovich Tolstoy, the son of Russian writer Leo Tolstoy.
