= Tin Ka Ping =

Hong Kong-Chinese businessman and philanthropist

The Honourable Tin Ka Ping GBM MBE
- 田家炳
- Born: 20 November 1919; Dabu, Guangdong, China
- Died: 10 July 2018 (aged 98); Hong Kong, China
- Other name: Tian Jiabing
- Occupations: Businessman, philanthropist
- Title: Founder of Tin's Chemical Industry Company and Tin Ka Ping Foundation

Chinese name
- Chinese: 田家炳
Transcriptions
Standard Mandarin
- Hanyu Pinyin: Tián Jiābǐng
- Wade–Giles: T'ien Chia-ping
Yue: Cantonese
- Yale Romanization: Tin^{4} Gaa^{1}bing2

Tin Ka Ping GBM MBE (Chinese: 田家炳; 20 November 1919 – 10 July 2018), also known as K. P. Tin or Tian Jiabing, was a Hong Kong businessman and philanthropist. He was the founder and chairman of Tin's Chemical Industrial Company and the Tin Ka Ping Foundation.

Tin donated billions of Hong Kong dollars and funded hundreds of schools, dozens of hospitals, and thousands of rural libraries throughout China. He was awarded numerous honours for his philanthropy, including the Order of the British Empire by Queen Elizabeth II, the Grand Bauhinia Medal by the Hong Kong government, a Gold Plate on Contribution to Public Welfare by President Lee Teng-hui of Taiwan, honorary citizenships by more than 80 cities, and honorary doctorate degrees by over ten universities. Chinese astronomers named the asteroid 2886 Tinkaping after him, and his childhood home in Dabu County is protected as a heritage site.

== Early life ==
Tin Ka Ping was born in 1919 in a wealthy Hakka Dabu County, Meizhou, China. He was the only son of his father, a businessman who ran a grocery store and a kiln.

== Business career ==
When his father died in 1935, Tin was forced to quit school at the age of 15 to run the family business. He went to Vietnam in 1937 to export the porcelain clay which Dabu is famous for, and soon controlled 60% of Dabu's export business. However, the Second Sino-Japanese War broke out, and in June 1939 the Imperial Japanese Army occupied Shantou, the main port in eastern Guangdong, blocking the export route from Dabu.

Tin moved to Indonesia in 1939 to join his cousin and helped run the latter's metal factory. After the Surrender of Japan in 1945, he founded a factory in Jakarta to process the abundant supply of local rubber, and later expanded the business with a second factory. In 1956, he started the first plastic film factory in Indonesia.

Because of government policies that discriminated against Chinese Indonesians, in 1959 he left Indonesia for Hong Kong. He built a factory in Tuen Mun District making plastics and artificial leather, and his Tin’s Chemical Industrial Company became a leader in Hong Kong's chemical industry. He later opened a second factory and owned several industrial buildings. With China's reform and opening in the 1980s, Tin joined many other Hong Kong companies to open factories in the mainland. He opened his first mainland factory in Humen, Dongguan, and gradually grew the business.

== Philanthropy ==
Tin was involved in philanthropy since the 1960s and 1970s, when he served as a director of Hong Kong's three largest charities at the time: Pok Oi Hospital, Tung Wah Group of Hospitals, and Yan Oi Tong.

In 1982, he donated more than a billion Hong Kong dollars, which was about 80% of his wealth, to establish the Tin Ka Ping Foundation, dedicated to making donations in education, medical care, transportation, and other public facilities. In 2009, he transferred the rest of his assets into the foundation, and retired from its active management.

Having been forced to quit school in his childhood, Tin dedicated much of his resources to funding education. Since the 1980s, Tin made donations to 93 universities, 166 secondary schools, 41 elementary schools, and 19 specialized schools and kindergartens. He also funded 1,800 libraries in rural schools, 29 hospitals, and 130 bridges and roads. There are schools bearing his name in every province, municipality, and autonomous region in China, and he has been honoured as the "Father of a hundred schools" (百校之父). He also sponsored schools in Taiwan, Singapore and the United States.

Tin's businesses and foundation suffered massive losses during the 1997 Asian financial crisis. To help fund his foundation, in 2001 he sold his house in Kowloon Tong that he and his wife had lived in for 37 years, and rented a 1,300-square-foot (120 m^{2}) apartment. He donated the entire proceeds of HK$56 million to more than 20 secondary schools. It was seen as an "incredible" decision by Hong Kong media.

== Honours and awards ==
Tin had received numerous honours and awards in Hong Kong, China, Taiwan, and Britain, for his contributions to public welfare. He was awarded the British Empire Medal in 1982, the Order of the British Empire by Queen Elizabeth II in 1996, and the Grand Bauhinia Medal in 2010 by the Hong Kong government. Taiwanese President Lee Teng-hui presented him a Gold Plate on Contribution to Public Welfare in 1988. He was named the "Star of Education" by the Hong Kong Loving Hearts Campaign. In 1994, the Purple Mountain Observatory named the asteroid 2886 Tinkaping after him. He was an honorary citizen of more than 80 cities and counties in China, and was awarded the honorary doctorate by more than 10 universities in China, Hong Kong, and Taiwan.

Tin's former home, the Gong Chen Building located in Yintan Village, Gaopo Town, is now protected as a heritage site by the government of Dabu County. It has opened as a museum honouring Tin Ka Ping.

== Personal life and death ==
Tin was married to Fong Wai-ying. They had more than 20 children, grandchildren, and great-grandchildren. With the belief that it was "better to bequeath virtue rather than wealth to one's children", Tin donated the vast majority of his assets to his charitable foundation.

In 2013, when he was 94, Tin was baptised and became a Christian.

Tin died on 10 July 2018 in Hong Kong, at the age of 98.
