= Lev Lvovich Tolstoy =

Russian writer

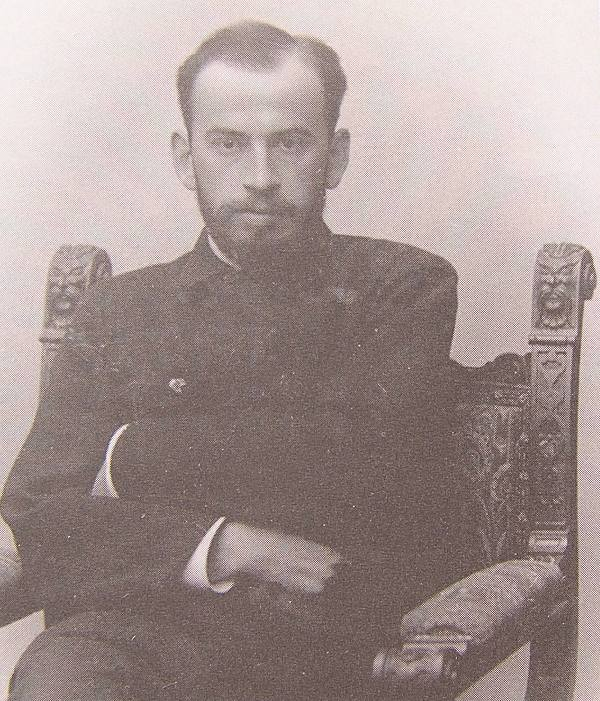
Lev Lvovich Tolstoy

Count Lev Lvovich Tolstoy (Russian: Лев Львович Толстой; 1 June (Old style: 20 May) 1869 – 18 October 1945) was a Russian writer, and the fourth child and third son of Leo Tolstoy.

Lev Lvovich, whom his father once called "Leo Tolstoy, Junior" was a fairly well known and respected belletristic author and playwright in pre-Revolutionary Russia. Although he had enjoyed good relations with his parents, by the 1890s Lev Lvovich had come to doubt his father's religious and moral teachings, eventually becoming an ardent monarchist and Russian patriot.

While living in exile after the Russian Revolution in Sweden, he became a vocal and sometimes harsh critic of his father's teachings. He continued to write there, but also received attention as an artist and sculptor: he participated in numerous exhibits, where his busts of his father, Benito Mussolini, and Herbert Hoover brought renown.

He died in Helsingborg, Sweden on 18 October 1945. He is buried in the cemetery of Sireköpinge Church.
