= Le Travailleur de Lot-et-Garonne =

- Type: Weekly newspaper
- Founded: October 4, 1919
- Political alignment: Communist
- Language: French language
- Headquarters: Agen

Le Travailleur de Lot-et-Garonne ('The Worker of Lot-et-Garonne') is a communist weekly newspaper published from Agen, France. The first issue of Le Travailleur de Lot-et-Garonne was published on October 4, 1919. The newspaper, then an organ of the local socialists of Agen under the leadership of Renaud Jean, survived its initial period by enlisting 500 subscribers (mainly railway workers).
