= Fourteen (play) =

- Written by: Alice Gerstenberg, 1919
- Characters: Dunham; Mrs. Pringle; Elaine
- Setting: The dining room of a New York residence

Premiere
- Date premiered: 1919
- Place premiered: Arthur Maitland's Theatre, San Francisco

Fourteen is a play by Alice Gerstenberg. The play was originally published in the February 1920 issue of The Drama magazine. It is now a public domain work and may be performed without royalties.

== Production ==
This one-act social satire was first performed October 7, 1919 at the Maitland Playhouse, 332 Stockton Street, San Francisco, on a bill with three other one-act plays. The San Francisco Chronicle remarked that it "gayly lampoons the question of dinner entertainments". Arthur Maitland's company had just moved into a new 200-seat theater from its previous incarnation as the St. Francis Little Theatre Club in the Colonial Ballroom of the St. Francis Hotel.

== Characters ==
- Mrs. Horace Pringle, a woman of fashion.
- Elaine, her debutante daughter.
- Dunham, the butler or maid.

== Synopsis ==
Mrs. Pringle is preparing to host a dinner party to introduce her daughter, Elaine, to the city's most eligible bachelor, Oliver Farnsworth. Illness and a blizzard force some guests to cancel and the three characters are compelled to try to salvage the evening and the dinner-table layout.

== Reception ==
Writing in The Drama magazine, J. Vandervoort Sloan described Gerstenberg as "a progressive young playwright, possibly the best-known and most widely be-played by amateur groups in America" and Fourteen as belonging "in the 'a' class of her plays". A reviewer for the American Library Association called it an "exemplary social farce".

The play was among those "unqualifiedly recommended" for high-school productions in front of "mixed audiences" by a New Jersey public school drama adviser in 1923. The adviser described it as "portraying the contretemps of a dinner party".

The play has continued to appeal to theater companies and audiences, with several modern productions. Reviewing a 2007 production in the New York Times, Anne Midgette described Fourteen as delightfully dated.
