= Battle of Port-au-Prince (1919) =

Battle during the Banana Wars

- Part of the United States occupation of Haiti, Second Caco War, Banana Wars
Date	6–7 October 1919
Location	Port-au-Prince, Haiti 18.533°N 72.333°W
Result	American-Haitian government victory

Belligerents
United States (Haiti) Haitian government	(Haiti) Cacos

Commanders and leaders
(United States) Kemp Christian	(Haiti) Charlemagne Péralte

Strength
Unknown	200–300 rebels "a number of Port-au-Prince sympathisers"

Casualties and losses
Unknown, likely low casualties	30+ killed 20 horses captured 1 field gun captured

The Battle of Port-au-Prince took place on either the 6 or 7 October 1919 when Haitian rebels, known as Cacos, attacked the capital of Haiti during the Second Caco War and the American occupation of Haiti.

The assault began at 4:00 a.m., with between 200 and 300 Cacos, armed with "swords, machetes, and pikes" and commanded by Charlemagne Masséna Péralte, entering the city from the North, only to be met by fearsome rifle and machine gun fire from the American Marines and Haitian gendarmes garrisoning the city. The latter were ready for the attack, since Péralte had "sent an advance warning to the British embassy." The defenders counterattacked and, within two minutes, the Caco raid disintegrated.

On 8 October, Lieutenant Kemp C. Christian, leading 12 Haitian gendarmes, captured Péralte's base camp, killing 30 Caco rebels and capturing 20 horses, some rifles and swords, and a field gun (Péralte's only one). The rebel leader managed to escape.
