= Arthur Goss =

Canadian photographer

Arthur Scott Goss
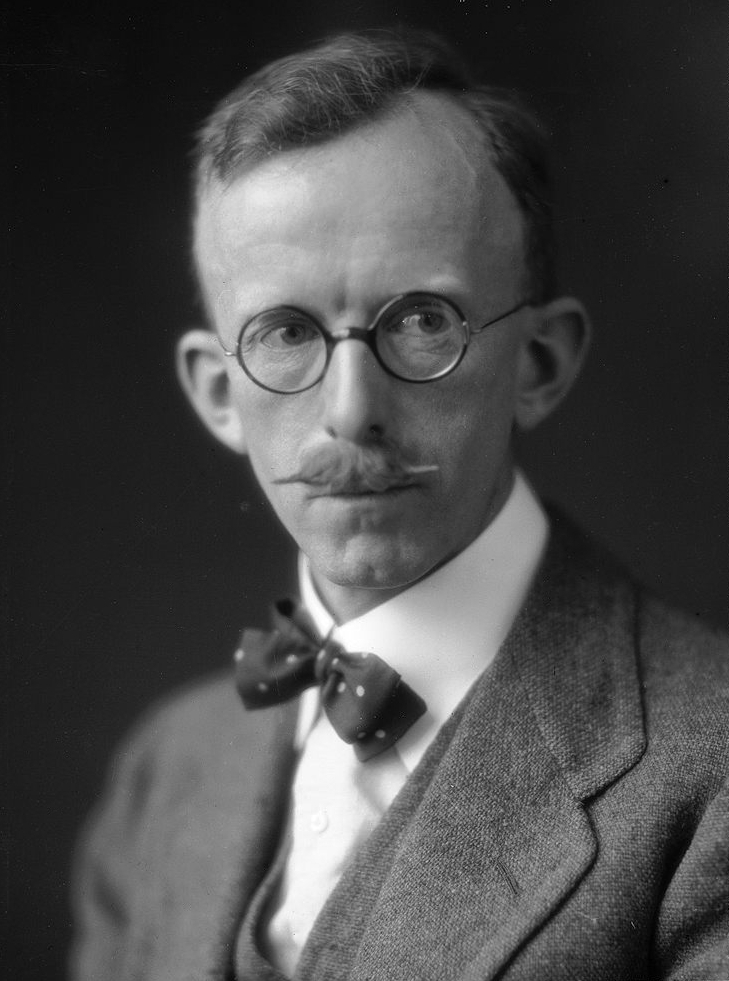
- Arthur Scott Goss, Toronto′s first official photographer
- Born: March 4, 1881; London, Ontario, Canada
- Died: June 1, 1940 (aged 59); Toronto, Ontario, Canada
- Other name: Arthur S. Goss
- Occupation: photographer
- Spouse: Ethel Ross Munro Goss
- Children: Enid, John, and Mary

Arthur S. Goss, also known as William Arthur Scott Goss (1881-1940) was the City of Toronto's first official photographer.

== Early life ==
William Arthur Scott Goss was born in London, Ontario on 4 March 1881, moving to Toronto in 1883, where his father, John Goss, worked in the newspaper and publishing industries. When his father died, Goss, age 10, began work as an office boy in the city engineer's office. He was promoted to clerk of street repairs in 1899 and worked as a clerk and a draughtsman for nearly twenty years. Then, in 1911, he was promoted to head of the photography and blueprinting section and became the city of Toronto's first official photographer.

== Professional life ==
Working until his death in 1940, Goss made photographs for a range of municipal departments. Some of his best-known images were taken for the Works and Health Departments. For the Works Department, he photographed street cleaning, the construction of new roads, and major infrastructure projects, such as the city's new hydroelectric system and the Bloor Viaduct. His photographs of street grading and widening, bridge, underpass, and sewer construction, street cleaning, and garbage disposal were used as records to assist with the routine business of the Works Department, which, at the time, was focused on improving the physical environment of the city.

Medical Health Officer Dr. Charles Hastings enlisted Goss's help in his crusade to improve public health. Goss photographed unsanitary and overcrowded conditions for the Health Department, and Hastings used Goss's photographs as evidence in his 1911 report on slum conditions. Many of Goss's photographs for the Health Department were never published, but were used internally to identify problems, to track the progress of particular projects, or to report on new technologies and methods for carrying out the Department's work. With Goss as the city photographer, photographs quickly became an important resource in many aspects of Toronto's municipal government.

== Artistic interests ==
Goss was a member of the Toronto Camera Club and active within the pictorialist movement. The artist intended to help create a national network of photographers, and was also associated with the Arts and Letters Club, with which he staged a number of exhibitions in the 1910s. Modeled after the Group of Seven, Goss hoped to develop distinctly Canadian style within global photography. Though the Arts and Letters Club was ultimately unable to achieve a similar level of fame, it managed to connect leading figures in Canadian Art including A.Y. Jackson, F.H. Varley, and Harold Mortimer-Lamb.

He explored customary pictorialist subject matter, such as portraits and landscapes, and experimented with the characteristic soft-focus style of pictorialism. Like others associated with the movement, Goss aimed to produce aesthetically pleasing images and viewed his artistic practice as a form of personal expression. He organized exhibitions of art photography and won awards for his own photographs, which were shown at exhibitions in Canada and England.

== Legacy ==
There are approximately 26,000 negatives in the Arthur Goss collection at the City of Toronto Archives. These negatives were found in the attic of old City Hall and were catalogued by city archivists in the 1960s.

Canadian writer Michael Ondaatje relied on Goss′s photographs when researching his novel In the Skin of a Lion about the immigrant and working class experience in early 20th Century Toronto. Ondaatje decided to include Goss as a character in this novel. Following the interest in Goss, following the publication of Ondaatje′s novel, the City of Toronto Archives developed a special lecture and tour, tailored for students, addressing the role of Goss′s photos in Ondaatje's book.

Goss's duties included providing a visual record of the health and social problems posed by urban poverty. Scholars have compared Goss's photographs of urban poverty to those of Jacob A. Riis and Lewis W. Hine.

Decades after his death, his work is celebrated, in several books collecting his photographs, and in magazine profiles.
