= R. C. Harris Water Treatment Plant =

Building in Toronto, Ontario, Canada

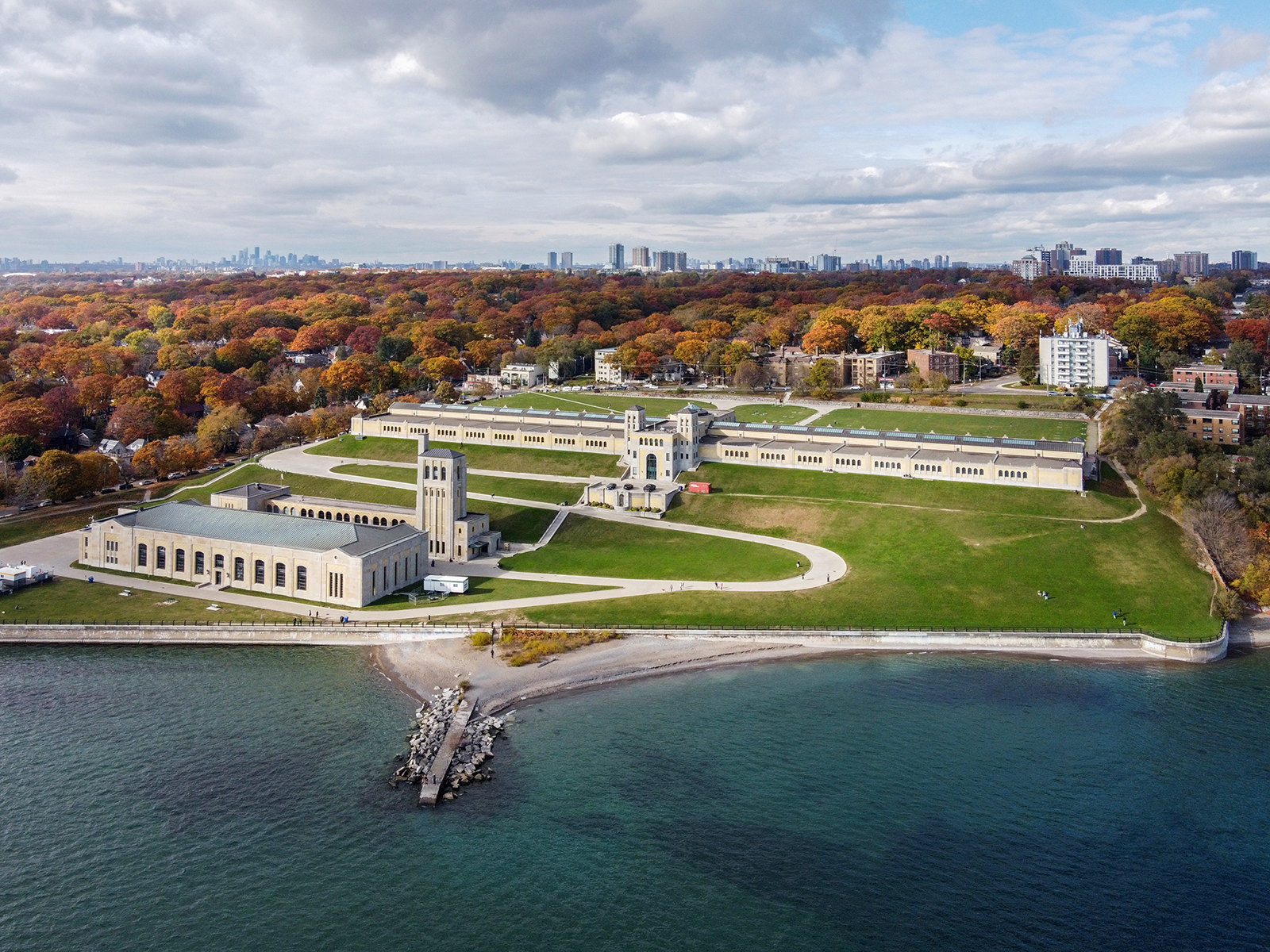
- Exterior of the building

General information
- Status: Operational
- Location: 2701 Queen Street East, Toronto, Ontario, Canada
- Coordinates: 43.673222°N 79.278819°W
- Named for: R. C. Harris
- Construction started: 1932
- Opened: November 1, 1941; 85 years ago

Ontario Heritage Act
- Designated: 1998

The R. C. Harris Water Treatment Plant in Toronto, Ontario, Canada, is both a crucial piece of infrastructure and an architecturally acclaimed historic building named after the longtime commissioner of Toronto's public works Roland Caldwell Harris. The plant's architect was Thomas Canfield Pomphrey with engineers H.G. Acres and William Gore. It is located in the east of the city at the eastern end of Queen Street and at the foot of Victoria Park Avenue along the shore of Lake Ontario in the Beaches in the city of Toronto, and the Birch Cliff neighbourhood of Scarborough.

It has been the location for a number of film productions, including Strange Brew (1983) with Rick Moranis and Dave Thomas.

== Roland Caldwell Harris ==
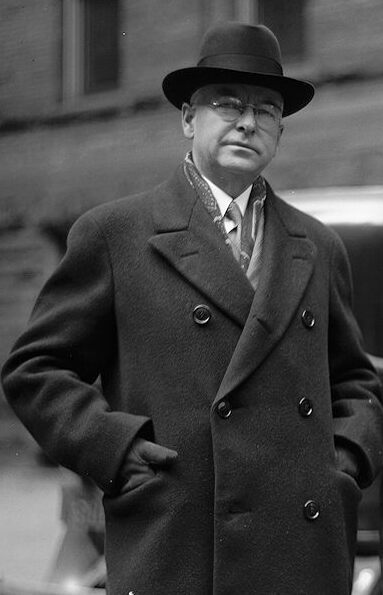
R.C. Harris in 1933

Harris was born in Lansing on May 26, 1875, in what is now North York, Ontario, but grew up in Toronto. As Public Works Commissioner from 1912 to 1945, Harris was involved in such projects as:

- Crawford Street Bridge, 1914-1915, with design heavily influenced by Harris
- Prince Edward Viaduct, opened in 1918, which included his idea to add a deck under the bridge allowing for the Bloor Danforth line to be built decades later.
- Mount Pleasant bridge as part of the extension of Mount Pleasant Road north to Lawrence Avenue East in 1934.
- expansion of the streetcar network of the Toronto Civic Railways from 1912 to 1915.
- Waterfront Railway Viaduct built from 1925 to 1934 to bring rail lines into Union Station.
- extension of University Avenue south of Queen Street West to Front Street in 1931.

Harris died on September 3, 1945. His son Lieutenant Colonel Roland Allen Harris was a member of the Queen's Own Rifles. Harris is buried in family plot at St. John's Norway Cemetery.

== Site history ==
=== Victoria Park ===
The land was once owned by Peter Patterson and was a popular spot for picnickers who nicknamed it "Yellowbanks" for the colour of the bluffs In 1878, Patterson leased the property to businessmen John Irwin, Bob Davies, and P.G. Close who hired John Boyle to develop and operate it as an amusement park. Buildings were erected and landscaping was done in time for it to open on June 8, 1878 as Victoria Park. Initially, the park was only accessible by water and a wharf was built to allow for steamships to bring picnickers from the Toronto Harbour at the foot of Yonge Street. The six-hectare park included a beach, with boating and canoe rentals, picnic shelters, a dance pavilion, restaurant, and an observation tower. Thomas Davies bought the park in 1886 and by 1894 the Toronto Railway Company extended streetcar lines to the park, allowing for ferry service to be discontinued. In 1899, the Toronto Railway Company took over the lease allowing it to continue as a trolley park along with nearby Munro Park which the TRC also operated. In 1906, the park was purchased by Henry Eckardt in a foreclosure sale after Davies had been unable to keep up the mortgage payments. Eckardt closed the park in 1906, the same year that nearby Munro Park closed. The traditions of both continued at Scarboro Beach Amusement Park which opened in 1907 and operated until 1925.

Victoria Park Avenue is named after the amusement park.

From 1912 to 1932 part of the property was used for Victoria Park Forest School during the summer. The T. Eaton Company also used the property for a summer camp for boys from 1917 until 1927. In 1927, the City of Toronto purchased the property for $370,000 in order to build the R.C. Harris Water Treatment Plant.

=== Water treatment plant ===
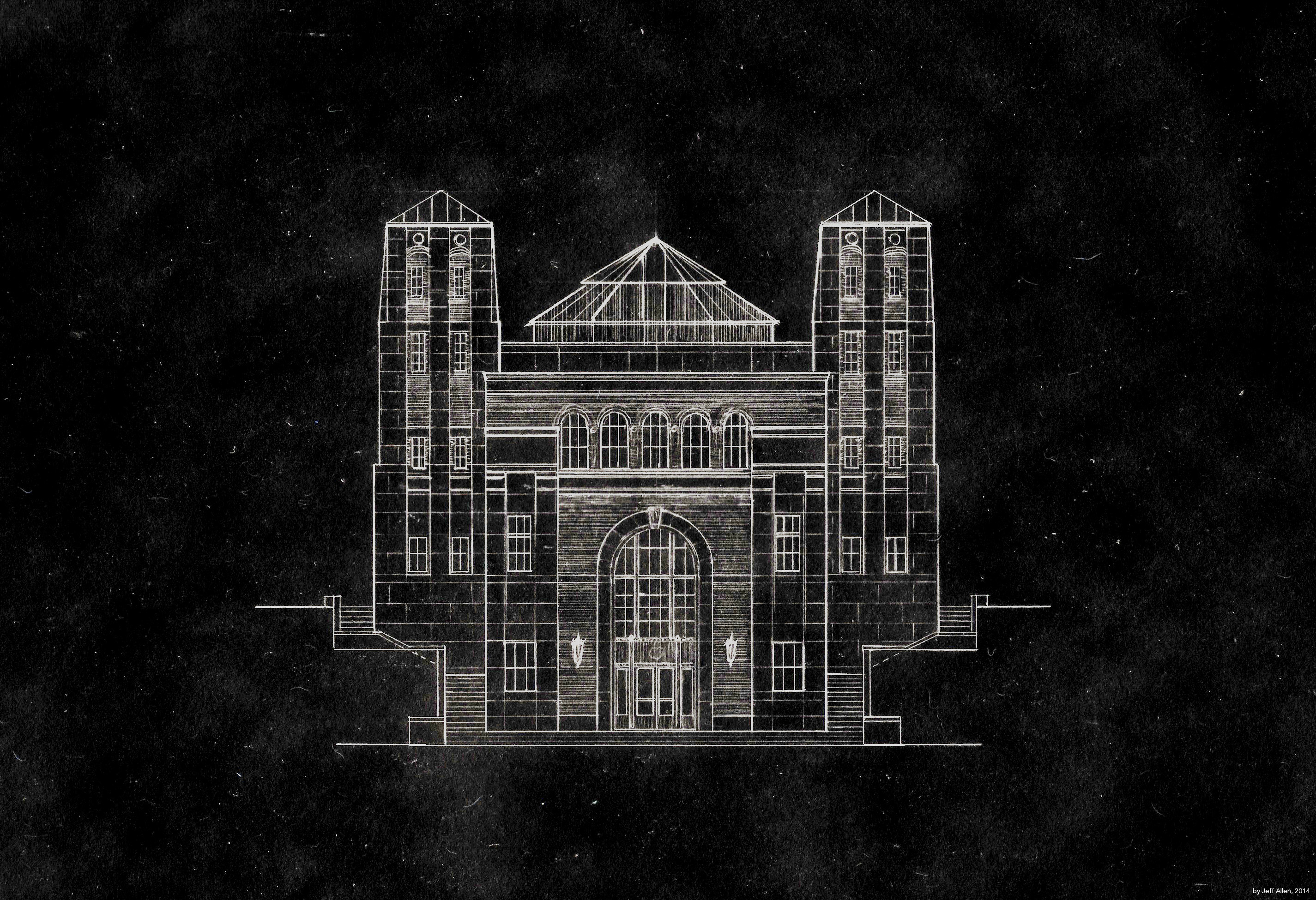
RC Harris Water Treatment Plant - Filtration Building - South Elevation

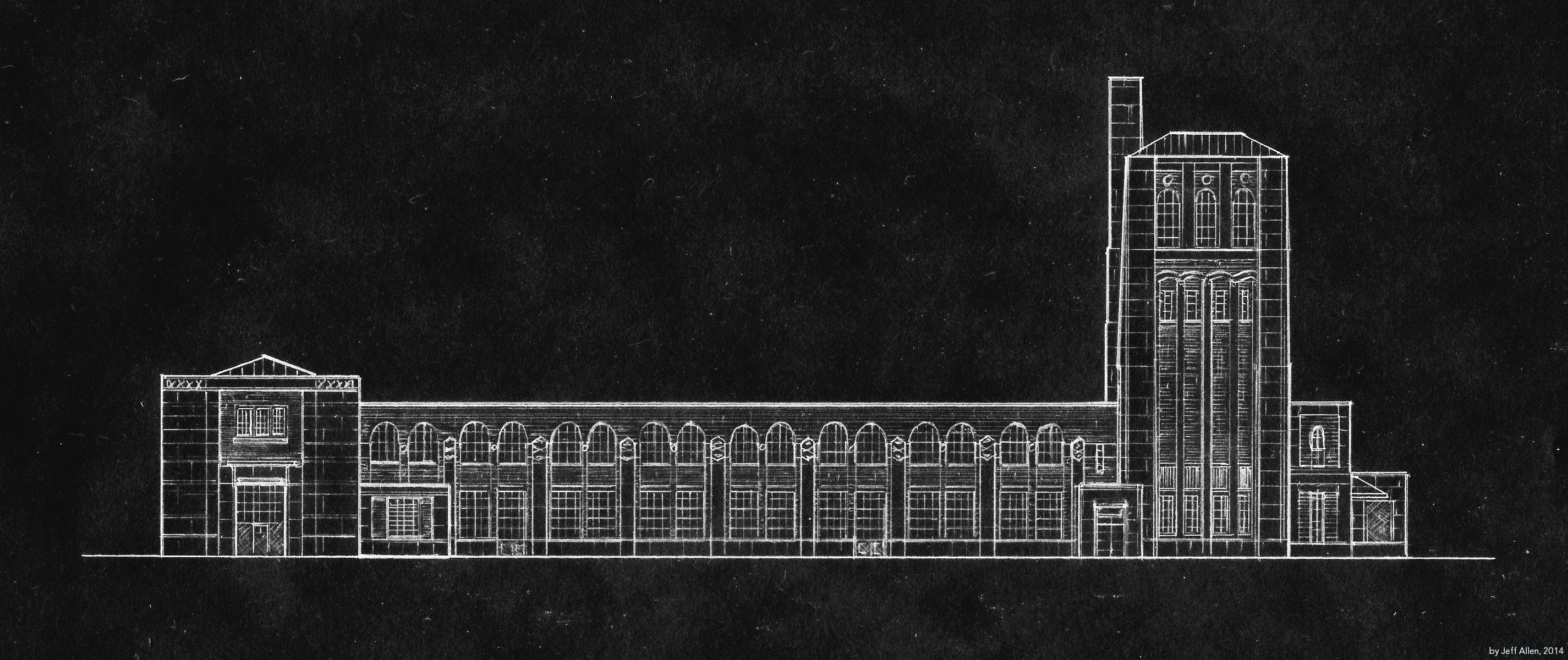
R.C. Harris Water Treatment Plant - Service Building - South Elevation

With an early 20th-century Toronto plagued with water shortages and unclean drinking water, public health advocates such as George Nasmith and Toronto's Medical Officer of Health, Charles Hastings, campaigned for a modern water purification system.

Construction for a water treatment plant began on the site in 1932 and the building became operational on November 1, 1941. The building, unlike most modern engineering structures, was also created to make an architectural statement. Fashioned in the Art Deco style, the cathedral-like structure remains one of Toronto's most admired buildings. It is, however, little known to outsiders. The interiors are just as opulent with marble entryways and vast halls filled with pools of water and filtration equipment. The plant has thus earned the nickname The Palace of Purification.

In 1992, the R. C. Harris Water Treatment Plant was named a national historic civil engineering site by the Canadian Society for Civil Engineering. It was designated under the Ontario Heritage Act in 1998. The plant appeared on a stamp issued by Canada Post in 2011, in a series showcasing five notable Art Deco buildings in Canada.

== Use ==
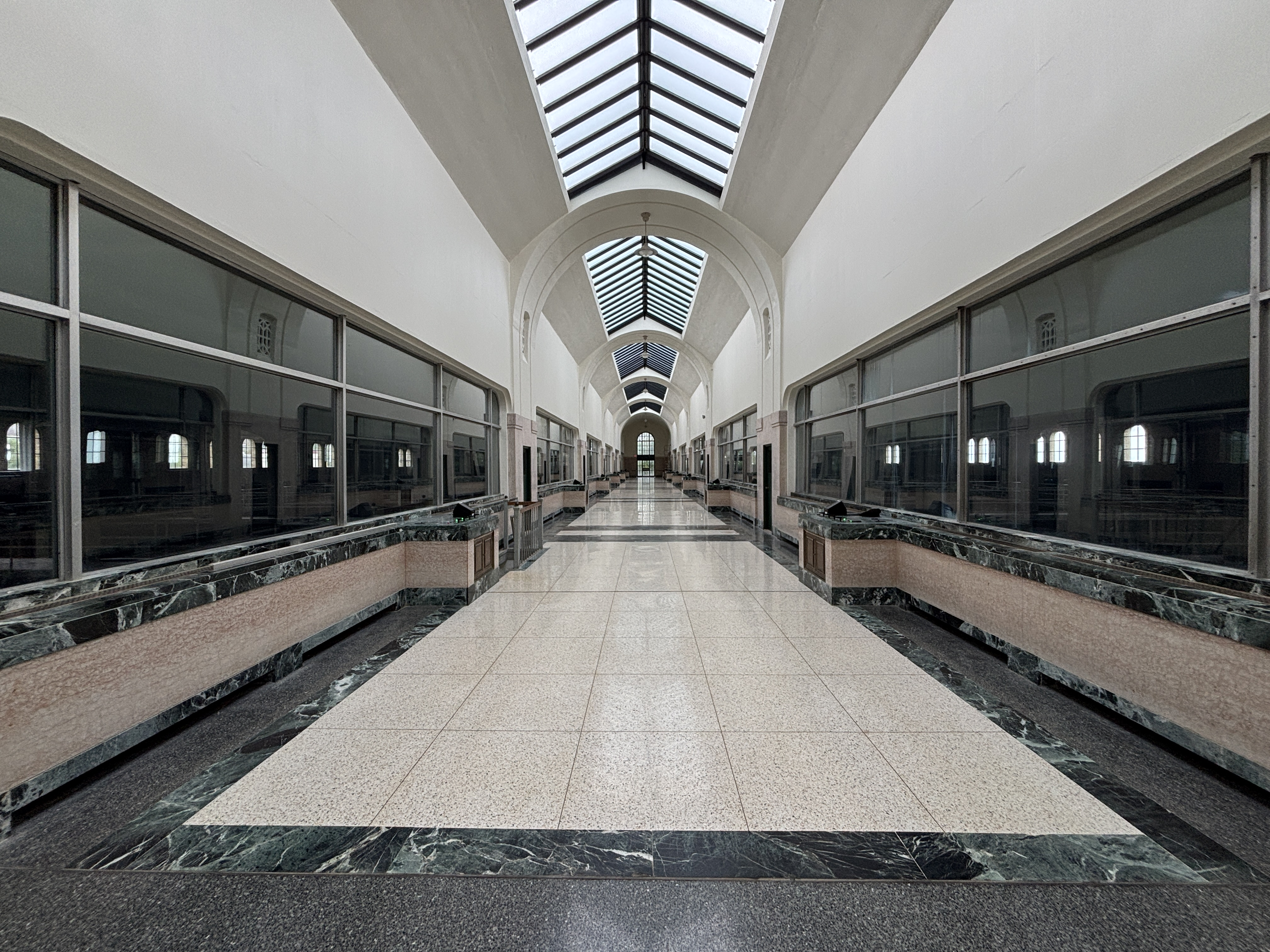
Filtration Building access

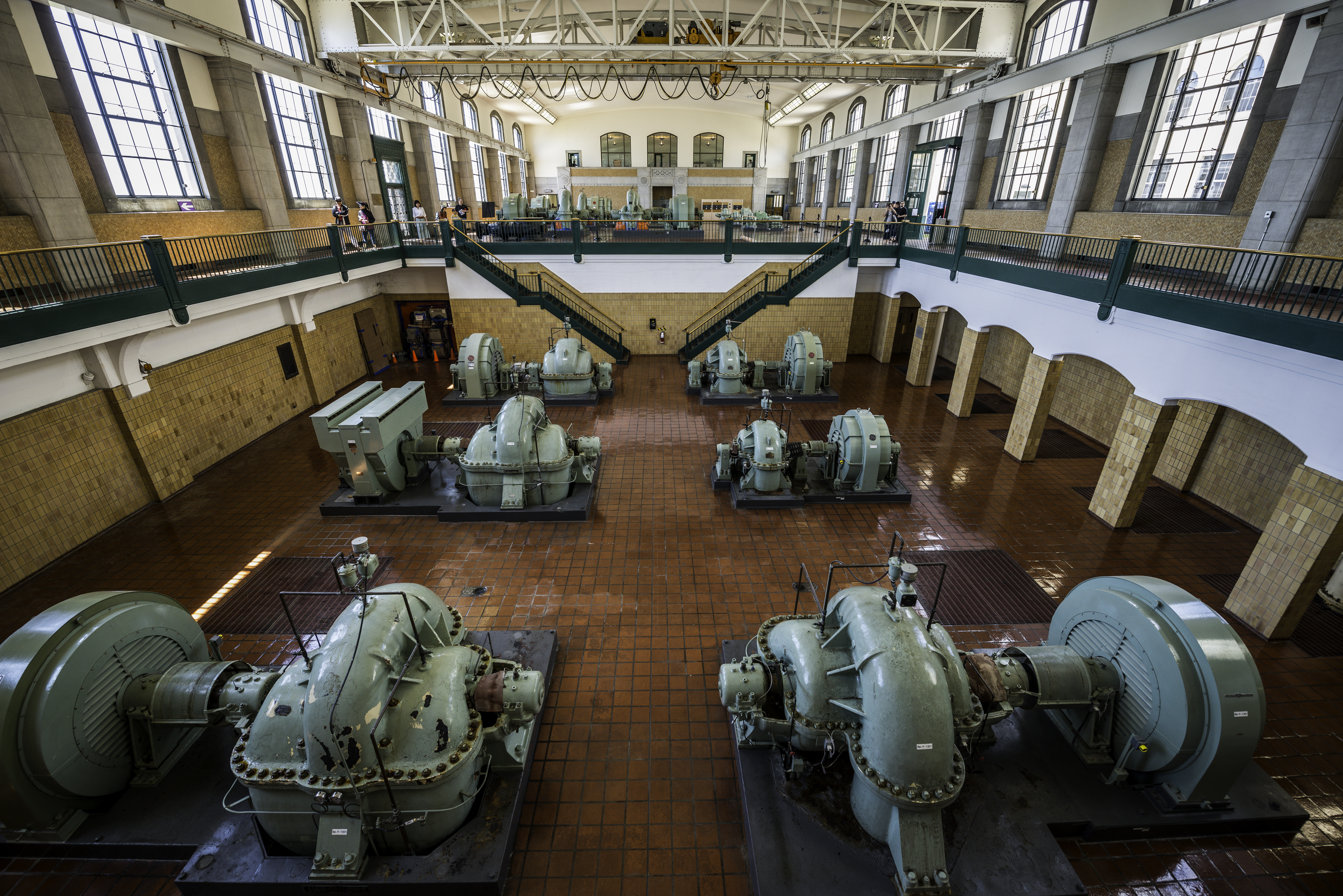
Water pumps at the treatment plant

Despite its age, the plant is still fully functional, providing approximately 30% of Toronto's water supply. The intakes are located over 2.6 kilometres (1.6 mi) from shore in 15 metres (49 ft) of water, running through two pipes under the bed of the lake. Water is also chlorinated in the plant and then pumped to various reservoirs throughout the City of Toronto and York Region.

== Access ==
The facility grounds have been made available to the public. Despite some concerns of vulnerability to an attack on the water supply since the September 11 attacks, the grounds have remained open to the public, but security has been increased. In the summer of 2007, construction began on the installation of an underground Residual Management Facility allowing processed waste to be removed before discharging into the lake. This construction has since been completed.

== In popular culture ==
The R. C. Harris Water Treatment Plant has been used in dozens of films and television series as a prison, clinic, or headquarters.

- The building of the plant is vividly recounted in Michael Ondaatje's In the Skin of a Lion.
- The headquarters of "The Man" in the 2002 comedy Undercover Brother.
- A prison in the 1998 comedy Half Baked.
- An asylum in the 1995 horror film In the Mouth of Madness.
- "The Centre," a nefarious think tank in the television series The Pretender.
- Base of operations for Genomex, an antagonistic corporation in the television series Mutant X.
- The Royal Canadian Institute for the Mentally Insane (next door to Elsinore Brewery) in the 1983 film Strange Brew.
- The Henry Ford Centre for the Criminally Insane, as seen in Robocop: The Series.
- The Langstaff Maximum Security Prison, as seen in Flashpoint in the episode Just a Man.
- The Mellonville Maximum Security Prison, as seen in an SCTV episode (1982).
- A prison in the Psi Factor: Chronicles of the Paranormal episode "Solitary Confinement."
- "Lake District Federal Prison" in Between in the episode School's Out.
- A prison building in the Conviction episode "A Different Kind of Death."
- A prison in the closing scenes of The Big Heist, when Donald Sutherland's character enters to serve a 20-year sentence.
- "Ekart County Jail" in the 2015 movie Regression.
- "U.N. Penitentiary Chesapeake Conservancy Zone" in the 2020 season of The Expanse.
- A Children’s Hospital in Guillermo Del Toro’s 1997 film Mimic.
- Medidas City, a location on the planet Qresh, in the television series Killjoys.
- The office of Richard Jenkins' character, Ezra Grindle, a factory executive with a dark past, in Guillermo Del Toro’s Nightmare Alley.
- Women's Prison in Mayor of Kingstown
- Music video for "When You Know Someone" by the band Valley
