= In the Skin of a Lion =

1987 novel by Michael Ondaatje

- First edition
- Author: Michael Ondaatje
- Language: English
- Genre: Fiction, Historical Fiction
- Publisher: McClelland and Stewart
- Publication date: 1987
- Publication place: Canada
- Media type: Print
- Pages: 243
- Awards: Governor General's Award (nominated), Trillium Book Award, Toronto Book Award, Toronto Arts Award
- ISBN: 0394563638
- OCLC: 16089069

In the Skin of a Lion is a novel by Canadian–Sri Lankan writer Michael Ondaatje published in 1987 by McClelland and Stewart. The novel fictionalizes the lives of the immigrants who played a large role in the building of the city of Toronto in the early 1900s, but whose contributions never became part of the city's official history.

Ondaatje illuminates the investment of these settlers in Canada, through their labour, while they remain outsiders to mainstream society. The novel began as a story about the 1919 disappearance of the Canadian theater magnate Ambrose Small, but Ondaatje decided to expand the story "to create a panoramic vision of the modern immigrant experience". In doing so, Ondaatje touched upon a number of flashpoints in early 20th century Canadian history, including the Toronto Police Department's Red Squad raids and the murder of Finnish labour organizers Viljo Rosvall and Janne Voutilainen. As he wrote, Ondaatje studied the archival collections of the City of Toronto as well as local newspapers. The narrative revolves around the construction of two Toronto landmarks: the Bloor Street Viaduct and the R. C. Harris Water Treatment Plant. The novel's title is taken from a line in The Epic of Gilgamesh, following the death of Enkidu: "I will let my hair grow long for your sake, I will wander through the wilderness in the skin of a lion."

The book was nominated for the Governor General's Award for English Language Fiction in 1987. Ondaatje's more famous 1992 novel, The English Patient, is, in part, a sequel to In the Skin of a Lion, continuing the characters of Hana and Caravaggio as well as revealing the fate of this novel's main character, Patrick Lewis.

== Plot summary ==
=== Book One ===
==== Little Seeds ====
The first chapter, "Little Seeds," describes the growing years of the main character, Patrick Lewis, providing causation for his subsequent actions in the novel. As a young boy in Depot Creek, Ontario, Patrick watches the loggers arrive in town in the winter, work in the mills in the other seasons, and skate on the frozen river. Patrick's father, Hazen Lewis, becomes a dynamiter and is meticulous when washing his clothes each evening to remove remnants of explosives on his apparel. These elements form the foundation of the subsequent narrative: Depot Creek, the loggers skating, learning about dynamite, etc.

==== The Bridge ====
"The Bridge" deals with the construction of the Bloor Street Viaduct, which will link eastern Toronto with the centre of the city and will carry traffic, water and electricity across the Don Valley. R.C. Harris, the city's Commissioner of Public Works often visits the bridge at night. One night, five nuns wander onto the unfinished bridge and one falls off. Nicholas Temelcoff, a Macedonian immigrant worker on the bridge, saves the nun who fell off the bridge, dislocating his arm. The nun, already missing her veil, tears her habit to make him a sling. Later, at a bar, he offers her brandy, compliments, and a new lease on life. Temelcoff is a silent man who struggles with English yet they are able to transcend their social and language barriers through the commonality of their scars— his from work, hers from being "always unlucky." This moment is the beginning of the nun's eventual transformation into the character Alice. He eventually falls asleep and wakes to find a doctor treating his arm and the nun gone.

==== The Searcher ====
As a young man, Patrick leaves the profession that killed his father and sets out to find the vanished millionaire Ambrose Small. This leads him to Small's mistress Clara Dickens and to a relationship with her. Eventually, Patrick loses interest in finding Small, hoping only to remove Clara from Small. Clara tells Patrick that she will leave him to go after Small and warns him not to follow her. Patrick is broken-hearted. Three years later, Clara's friend Alice unexpectedly arrives and tells Patrick that Clara's mother might know where Clara is. Patrick sets out to search for Clara. On meeting Clara's mother, Patrick learns that Clara and Small are living in his old hometown. Patrick finds Small living in a house owned by a timber company, and Small attempts to set him on fire—once by dropping kerosene on him and then by throwing a Molotov cocktail. Patrick escapes to his hotel room and is visited by Clara, who dresses his wounds and has sex with him before returning to Small.

=== Book Two ===
==== Palace of Purification ====
In 1930, Patrick is working as a dynamiter on a tunnel under Lake Ontario, a project of Commissioner Rowland Harris. Patrick rents an apartment in a Macedonian neighborhood. He is accepted into the neighborhood and is invited by Kosta, a fellow dynamiter, to a gathering at the Waterworks—a place where various nationalities gather for secret political discussions and entertainment. Patrick witnesses a performance in which an actor repeatedly smashes her hand against the stage and rushes forward to help her. He recognizes her as Alice Gull. His act of helping her turns out to be part of the show. Patrick visits Alice and learns about Hana, her nine-year-old daughter. Patrick and Alice become lovers. Patrick finds work in a leather company through Alice's friends and meets Nicholas Temelcoff, now a baker. On studying the bridge, Patrick learns about the nun that had fallen off, whose body was never found. He makes the connection after talking with Temelcoff and promises to look after Hana.

==== Remorse ====
Patrick travels by train, north of Huntsville, then takes a steamer to a Muskoka hotel frequented by the rich. He burns down the hotel, then escapes on a small boat, traveling to the next island, where he meets the blind Elizabeth. We learn that Alice has died suddenly and that Patrick committed the arson out of anger. Patrick swims out to a boat, knowing he will be caught by the authorities.

=== Book Three ===
==== Caravaggio ====
In the Kingston Penitentiary, Patrick and two other prisoners, Buck and Caravaggio, are painting the roof. Patrick and Buck paint Caravaggio in the blue of the roof so he can hide and escape. He steals new clothes and changes his dressing. Jumping a milk train, he makes his way north toward cottage country. He has a scar from an attack from which Patrick saved him by yelling out a square dance call. Caravaggio recalls his first robbery, in the course of which he broke his ankle while retrieving a painting, so he had hidden in a mushroom factory where a young woman named Giannetta helped him recover, with whom he had escaped by dressing as a woman. Caravaggio enters the cottage of a woman whom he met on the lake and calls his wife to let her know he's all right. After talking to the cottage owner, he returns to his brother-in-law's house, reuniting with Giannetta.

==== Maritime Theatre ====
Four years later, Patrick is released from prison and meets Temelcoff at the Geranium Bakery. Hana, now sixteen, has been living with Temelcoff's family. Patrick takes responsibility for Hana. One night, she wakes him to say that Clara Dickens has called. She tells him that Small is dead and asks him to pick her up from Marmora.

Realizing that the water supply is vulnerable to being cut off or poisoned, Harris installs guards at the Waterworks, which he built. Caravaggio introduces Patrick to his wife. They fraternize at a party for the rich, then steal a multimillion-dollar yacht from a couple they chloroform. Patrick intends to blow up the Filtration Plant with dynamite and Caravaggio's help. Patrick enters the plant through the water intake. He places dynamite about the plant testing facility and carries the detonating box to Harris' office, where he accuses Harris of exploiting the workers and ignoring their plight. Patrick tells Harris how Alice Gull was killed and we learn that she accidentally picked up the wrong satchel, containing a bomb. Exhausted, Patrick falls asleep, and in the morning Harris asks the police to defuse the bombs and bring a nurse for Patrick.

Patrick awakes and goes with Hana to retrieve Clara. At Hana's urging, Patrick tells her about Clara. Patrick asks Hana to drive to Marmora. The book ends with "'Lights' he said."

== Analysis ==
This novel is categorized thematically as post-colonial, as it is largely concerned with the native cultures and languages of immigrants in Canada. Additionally, the structure of the novel may be described as postmodern in that Ondaatje uses the integration of different voices, images, and re-organization of time to tell these stories.

Watson and McLeod note the use of a "searcher-figure" in Patrick, and by extension the narrator of the story, who act as observers finding "'truths'" in order to construct a cohesive history representative of all the parts that created it.

Devi draws on Ondaatje's use of converging narratives to uncover the vastly different experiences of immigrants in Canada, and symbolize the overarching issue of how their unofficial history is erased from the official histories.

Scholar Tessa Wotherspoon provides a feminist animal studies analysis of the novel, arguing it explores the parallel exploitation of masculine labour and non-human animals in early 20th-century Toronto. The reading highlights the multispecies nature of industrial work, where men and animals (cattle, mules, pit horses) jointly endure dangerous, violent labour for projects like Commissioner Harris's waterworks. This interpretation contends the novel subverts dominant Western masculinity. Characters like Patrick Lewis and Nicholas Temelcoff begin with isolated, risk-taking masculinity defined by their work. Their relationships with women and growing sensitivity to animal suffering, however, transform their gender performance. A key symbolic moment occurs in the leather tannery, where dyers leap into vats with animal skins, a scene read as a visual "merging of two oppressed groups."

== Themes and motifs ==
The novel's title is taken from a line in The Epic of Gilgamesh, following the death of Enkidu. It is located in the epigraph as "I will let my hair grow long for your sake, I will wander through the wilderness in the skin of a lion," echoing the theme of converging voices re-telling history. Diogenes is quoted at the climax of the third act, "[i]n a rich man's house there is nowhere to spit except in his face." Earlier in the third act, the character Caravaggio is described as keeping a dog to assist him in his burglaries because he does not trust anyone else. Throughout the book, light (from a lantern, flaming cattails and other sources) and darkness plays heavily in the context of the main characters and development of the plot, i.e., illumination of the Finnish loggers, moonlight, when Caravaggio is learning to become a thief in total darkness, Patrick's removal of the lamp when breaking into the water plant, the lights being turned off during the final dialogue between Patrick and Harris. The color blue is also mentioned often, especially during Caravaggio's escape from prison to help him camouflage himself against the blue prison roof. The idea of demarcation is emphasized by Caravaggio to Patrick.

== Awards and recognition ==
=== Literary awards ===
- Nominated for the 1987 Governor General's Award for English Language Fiction.
- Won the 1987 Trillium Book Award
- Won the 1988 Toronto Book Award
- Won the Toronto Arts Award

=== Other recognition ===
- Won the 2002 Canada Reads competition, championed by Steven Page.
- The City of Toronto Archives prepared a special tour of its collection of historic photos, taken by Arthur Goss, tailored for students reading In the Skin of a Lion, as Ondaatje's research for the novel was influenced by studying the photos.
- In 2009, a passage from "The Bridge" was placed at the Bloor Street Viaduct in Toronto, becoming the inaugural "bookmark" for Project Bookmark Canada, and marking the beginning of Canada's literary trail.

== See also ==
- Sleeping Dogs Lie
- The English Patient
