= F. W. Micklethwaite =

Canadian photographer (1849-1925)

Frank William Micklethwaite
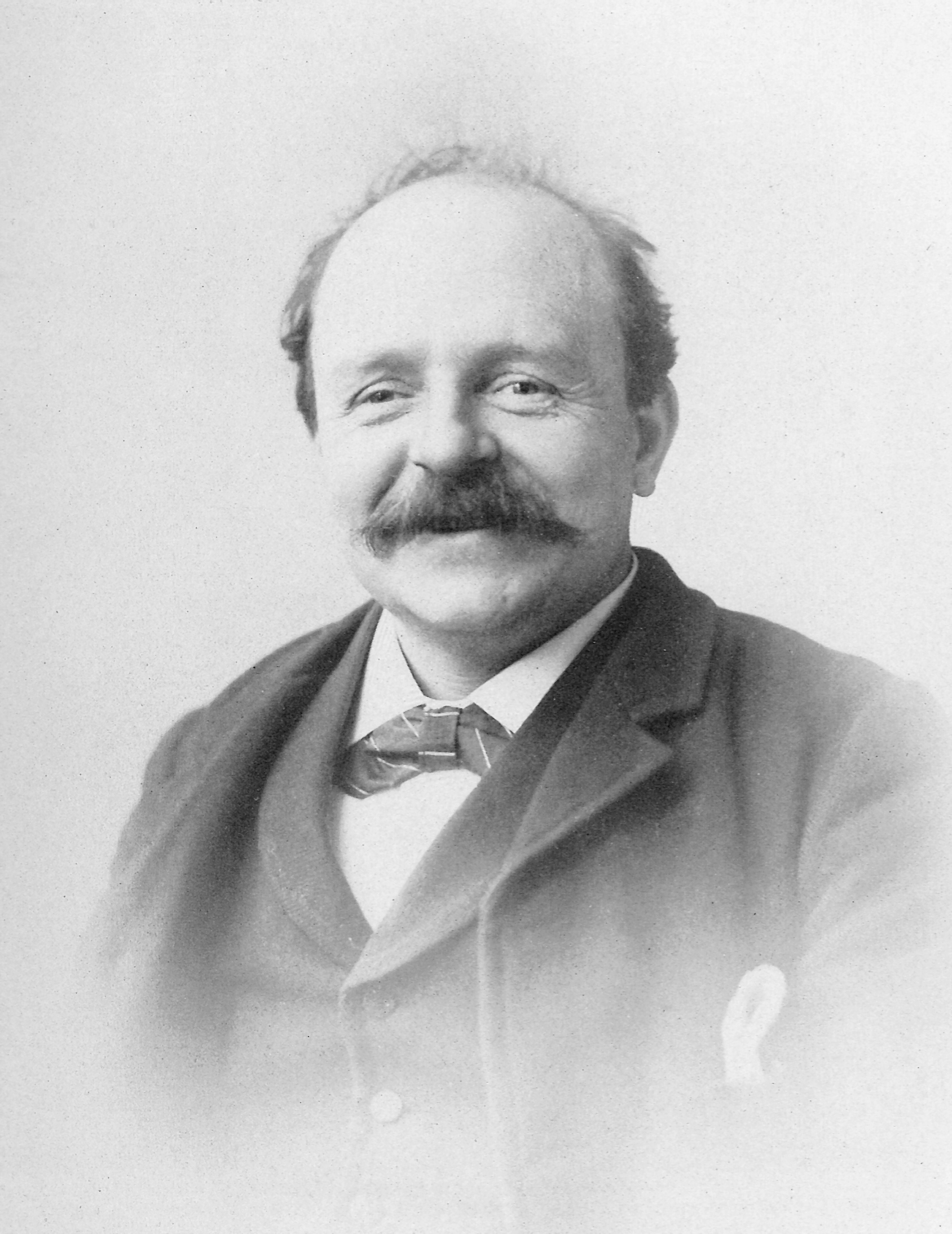
- Born: 13 March 1849; Ashton-under-Lyne, Lancashire, England
- Died: 5 December 1925 (aged 76); Toronto, Ontario, Canada
- Resting place: Mount Pleasant Cemetery, Toronto
- Occupation: Photographer
- Employer: Self-employed
- Spouse: Ruth Micklethwaite
- Children: 3

Frank William Micklethwaite (1849–1925) was a Canadian photographer, professionally known as F. W. Micklethwaite, whose photographs of Toronto and the Muskoka area form an important and unique photographic record of the province of Ontario's history in the late 19th century and early 20th century. Micklethwaite specialized in outside views and landscapes, as well as architectural and commercial photography, and he was one of Toronto's best known photographers.

== Background ==
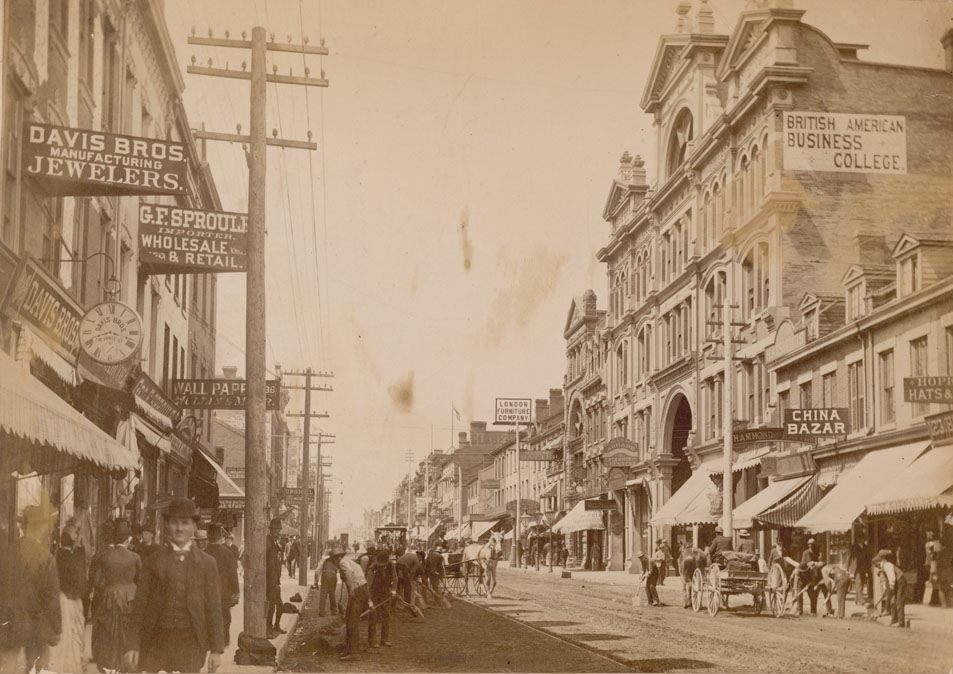
Photograph of Yonge Street by F.W. Micklethwaite, circa 1885

Micklethwaite was born in Ashton-under-Lyne, Lancashire, England, on 13 March 1849. His family moved to Ireland in the 1850s, where his father, William Barton Micklethwaite, practiced photography in Newry, County Down. The younger Micklethwaite studied photography while in Ireland, and emigrated to Toronto around 1875. After working for three years as a proof reader for The Mail newspaper, he opened a commercial photography business at 22 Queen Street West in 1878. He later opened a studio, the location of which changed frequently until he established it at 243 Yonge Street in 1910. Micklethwaite also took up residence in Port Sandfield each summertime, and he took thousands of photographs of the Muskoka lakes area and wealthy cottagers.

In addition to his private clients, Micklethwaite was also commissioned by the Engineer's Department of the City of Toronto government from approximately 1891 to 1895 to take photographs of public works and their construction. As such, Micklethwaite is credited with many early images of public infrastructure in Toronto.

== Death and legacy ==
Micklethwaite died on 5 December 1925, and he was buried in Mount Pleasant Cemetery next to his wife, Ruth. The photography business was willed to Micklethwaite's eldest son Fred. Fred Micklethwaite continued the family business until 1941, passing it on to his son, John Harold Micklethwaite, the fourth generation of Micklethwaite in the photography business. John was a commercial photographer in Toronto until his own death in 1983.

Many of F.W. Micklethwaite's photographs are held by the Library and Archives of Canada and the City of Toronto Archives. The Public Archives of Canada, the predecessor institution to the Library and Archives of Canada, held an exhibit of Micklethwaite's work in 1978, and a volume of his Muskoka photographs was published in 1993.
