= Chewitt Building =

Coordinates: 43.6478°N 79.3830°W

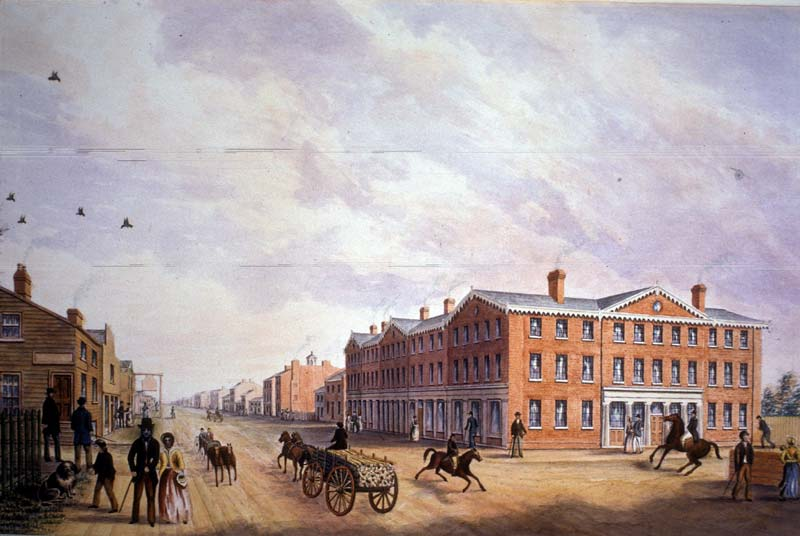
Chewitt Building c1833

The Chewitt Building was a former multi-use commercial building located on the southeast corner of King and York Streets in Toronto, Ontario, Canada. It was designed by Toronto-based architect John G. Howard, who moved his offices to the building after its completion in 1833. It was demolished in 1857 as part of the building of the Rossin House Hotel. The Toronto-Dominion Centre occupies most of the site after 1969 and the corner served as parking until it was infilled by the Standard Life Centre (121 King Street West) in 1984.

The building was a major commercial center, housing a wide variety of business offices. The ground floor held the British Coffee House, which mirrored the commercial coffee houses of London, providing a meeting placed for new business ventures. It was here on 29 July 1834 that the first meeting was held to discuss the building of what became the Northern Railway of Canada, the first railway in Upper Canada. The House was forced to close in 1837 as it was believed to be a major meeting point for members of the Upper Canada Rebellion.
