= Armstrong, Beere and Hime panorama =

The Armstrong, Beere and Hime panorama is an almost complete panorama of the city of Toronto taken in 1856–1857 by the firm Armstrong, Beere and Hime. They are the earliest known photographs of the city of Toronto, and create an almost complete record of the city at that time. A fictionalized history of the photographs and their story plays a central role in Michael Redhill's Consolation.

They were created by the firm Armstrong, Beere and Hime under contract from the city of Toronto. In 1857 the British Colonial Office was deciding which city should be made the capital of The Canadas. As part of their bid, the city of Toronto elected to present a set of photographs of the city to the authorities in London. The city paid Armstrong, Beere and Hime £60 to create four copies of 25 pictures. The panoramic images were taken from the roof of the Rossin House Hotel, at the southeast corner of King and York streets.

Toronto's bid to become the capital failed, and the photographs were lost and forgotten. They were rediscovered on October 9, 1979, when archivist Joan Schwartz located them when looking through records at the Colonial Office Library (original negatives were transferred to the Library of the Foreign and Commonwealth Office and Records, which are now on permanent loan at King’s College London). Subsequently, a second set of the pictures was found in Ottawa at the Library and Archives of Canada.

A set of modern duplicates, reproduced from copy negatives, was presented to the City of Toronto as a Sesquicentennial (150th anniversary) gift from the British government in 1984. These are housed in the City of Toronto Archives.

== The images ==
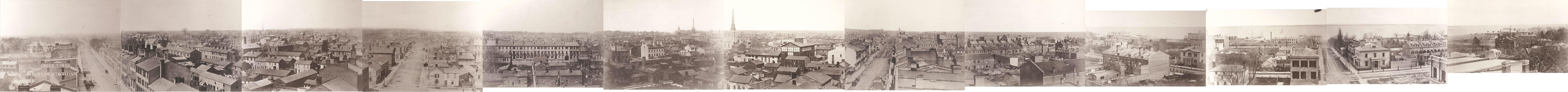
The panorama images linked together.

There were 25 pictures taken in total. 13 make up the almost complete panorama of the city, others were taken of various prominent buildings.

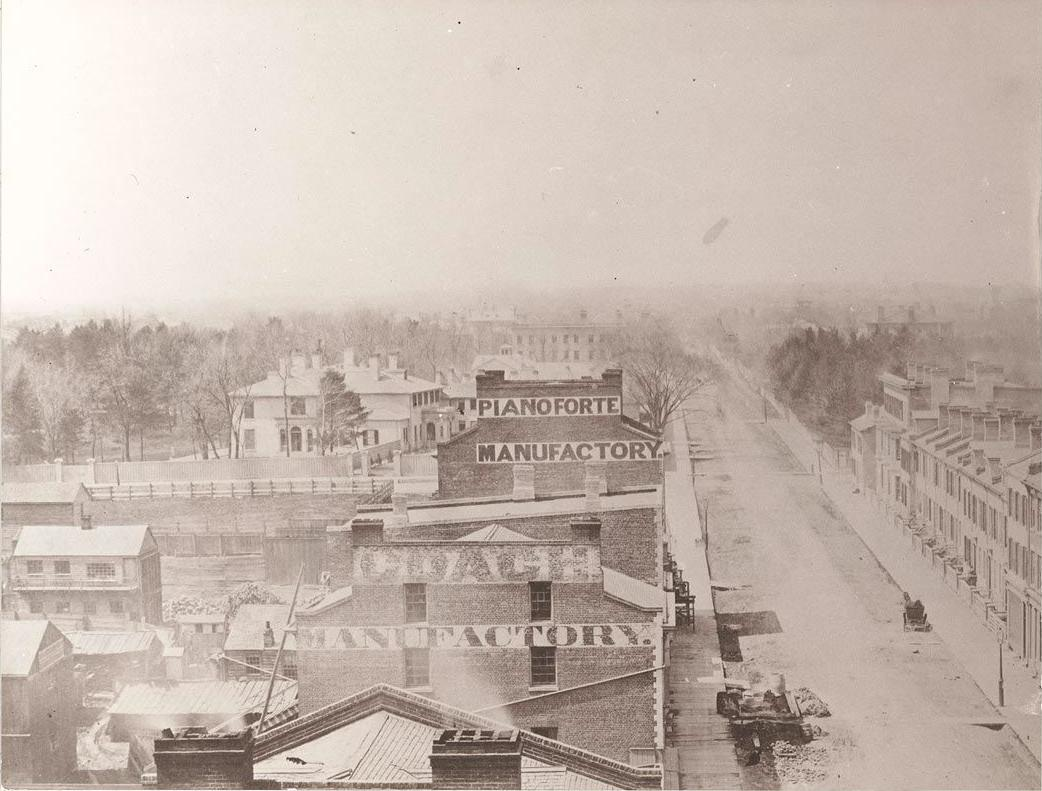
Looking west down King Street West Government House can be seen on the south side of the street

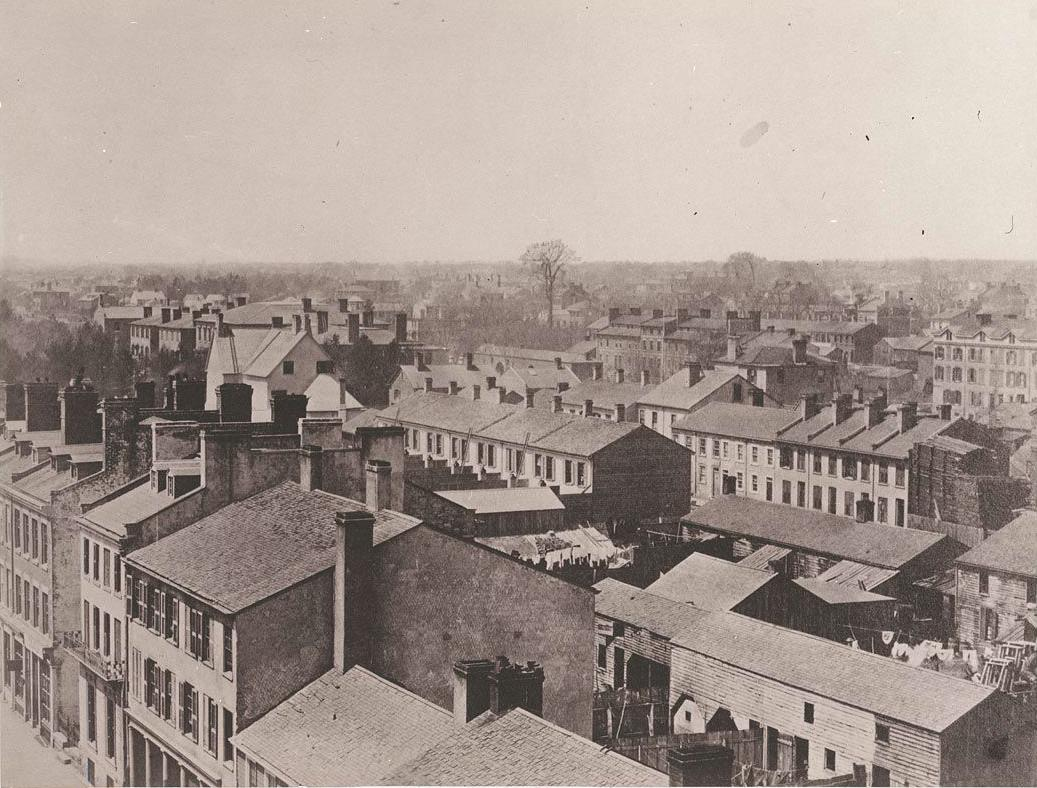
Looking west north west

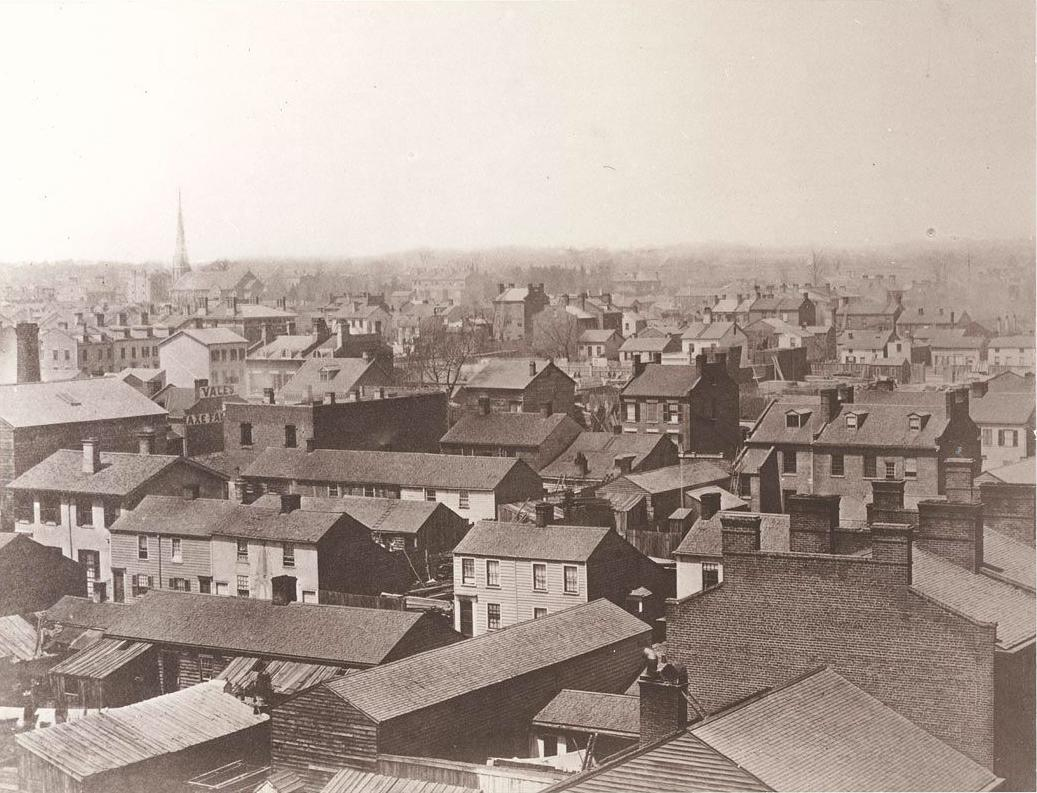
Looking north north west

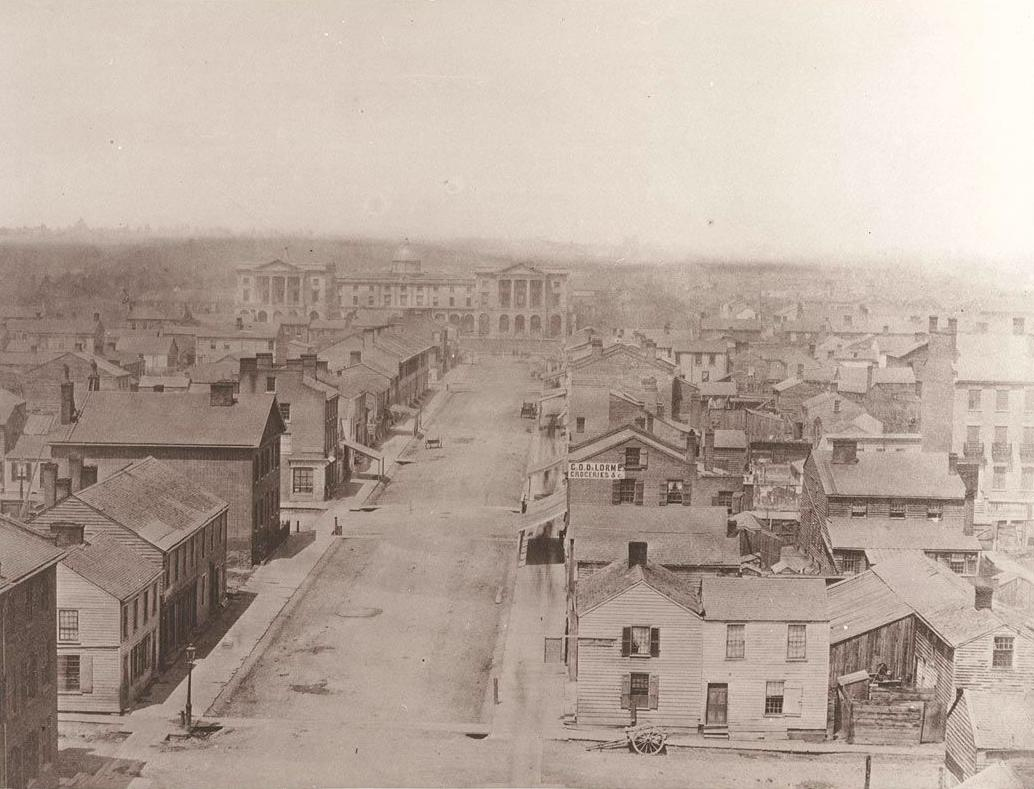
Looking north up York Street. Osgoode Hall is visible at the end of the street

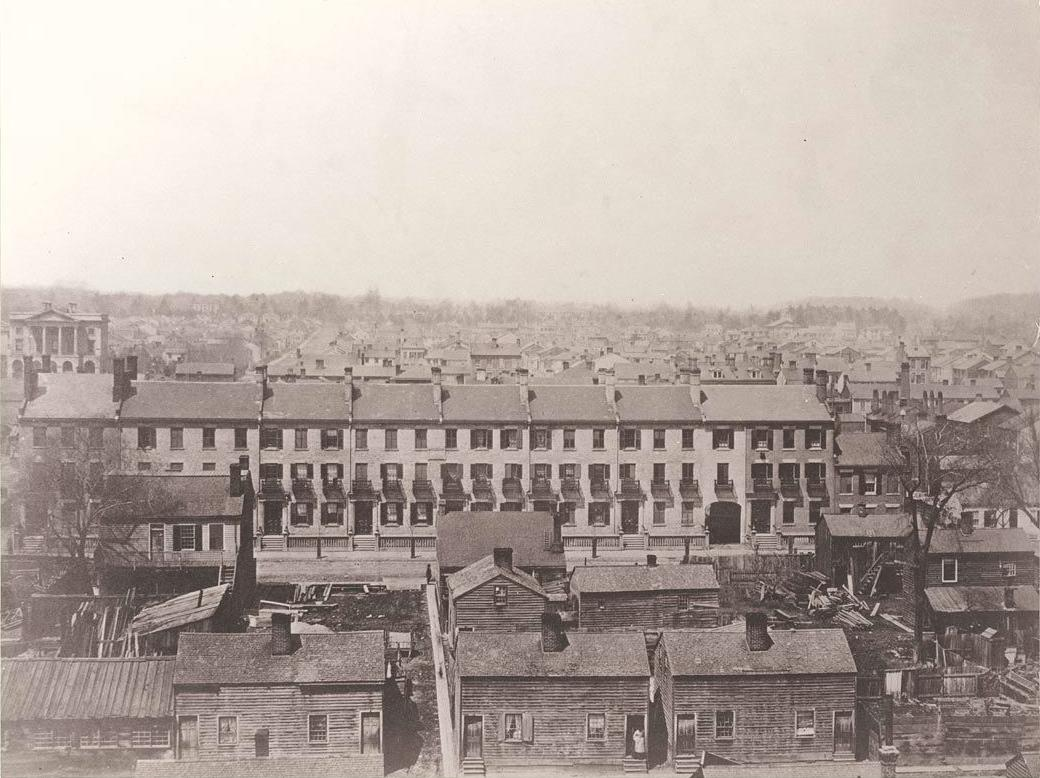
Looking north north east

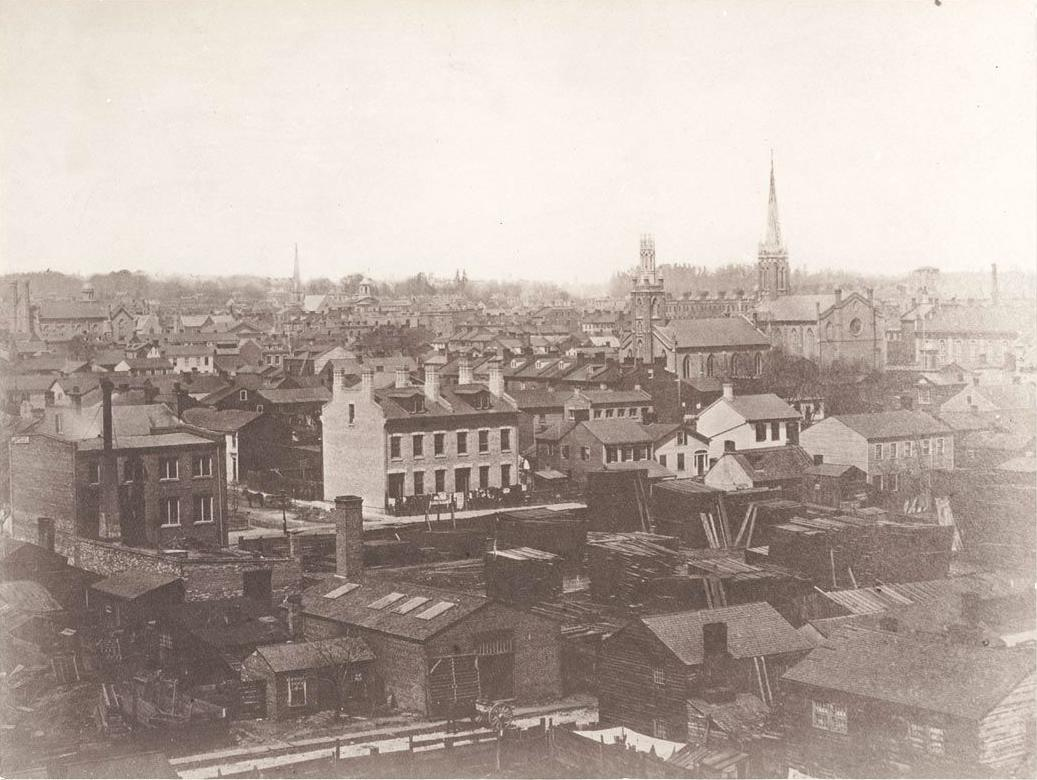
Looking north east. On the left hand edge one can see the Church of the Holy Trinity and in the centre can be seen the spire of the Toronto Normal School. Further to the right are group of churches, one which is Knox Presbyterian (photo)

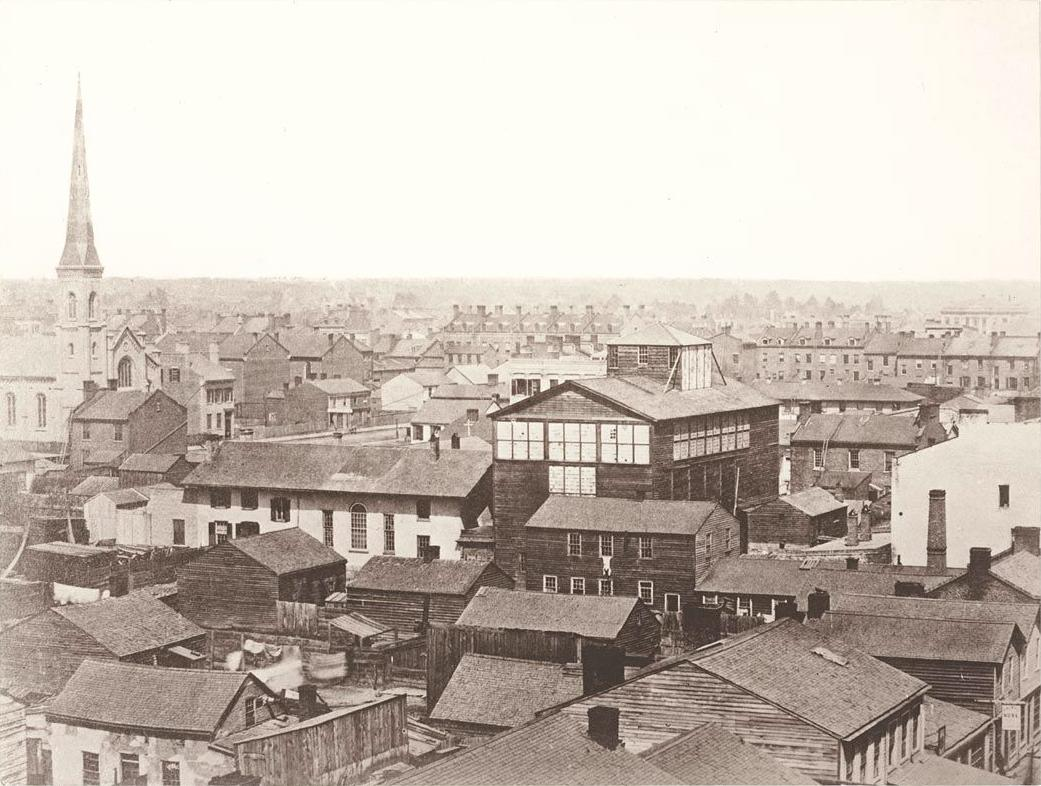
Looking east north east.

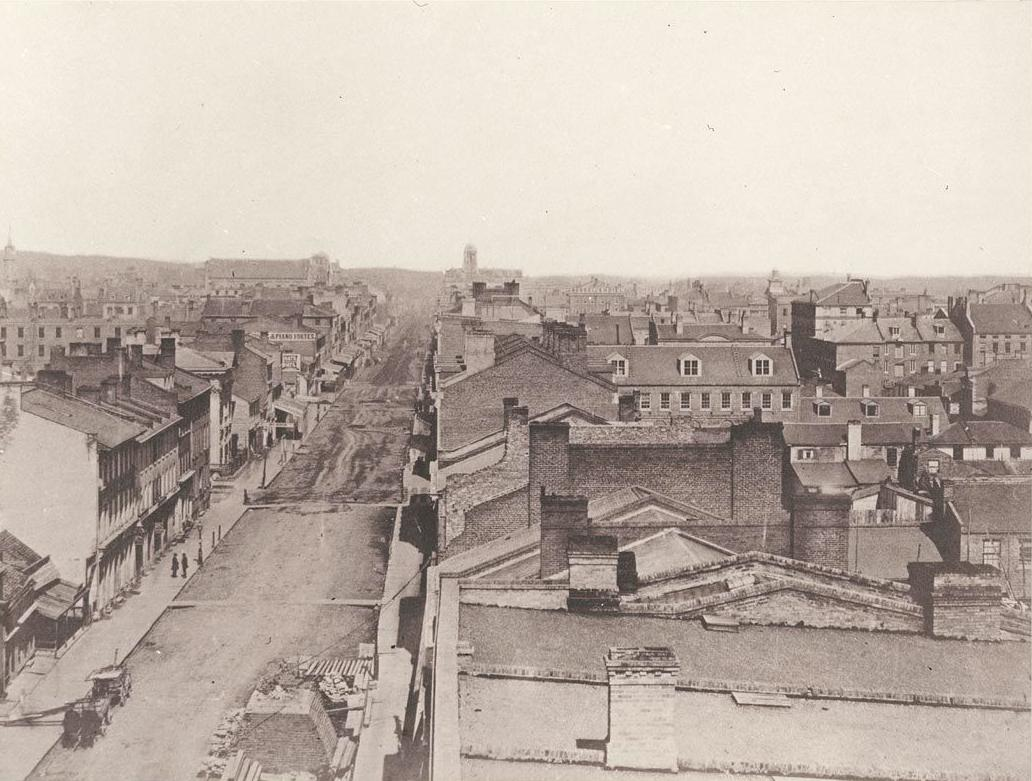
Looking east along King Street. On the north side of the street can be seen St. James Cathedral, which at that point did not have a spire. Across the street one can see St. Lawrence Hall

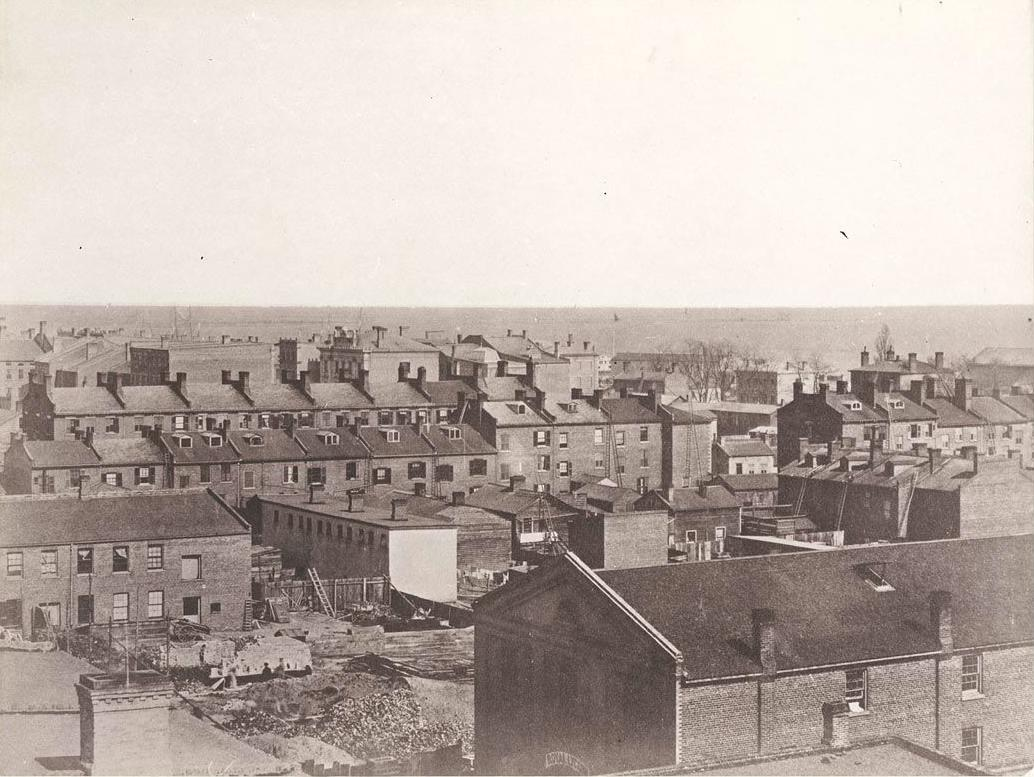
Looking east south east.

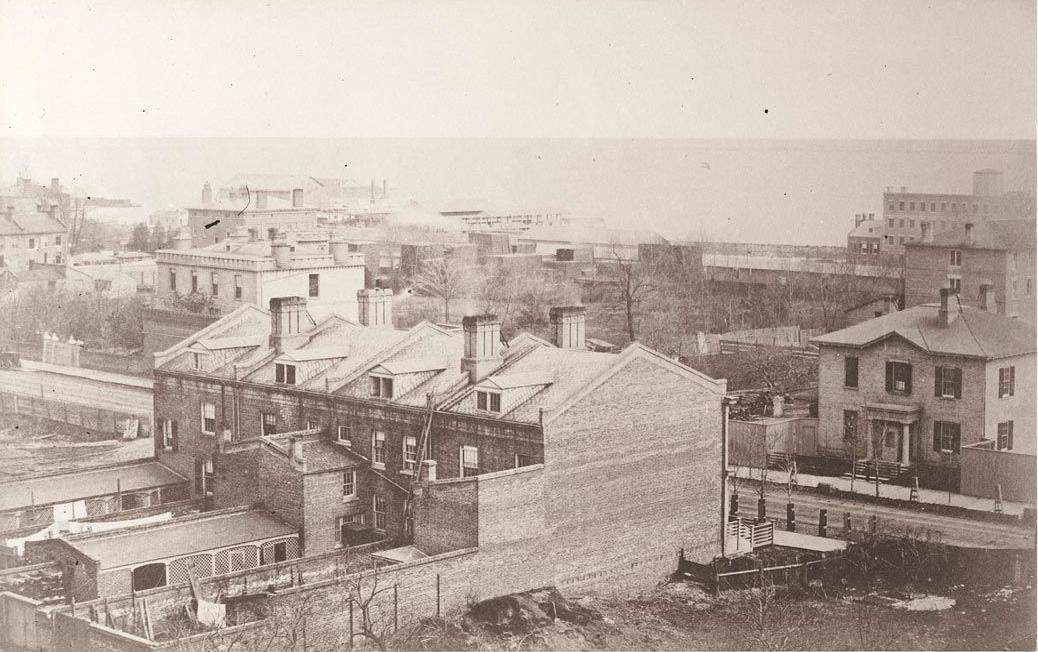
Looking south south east.

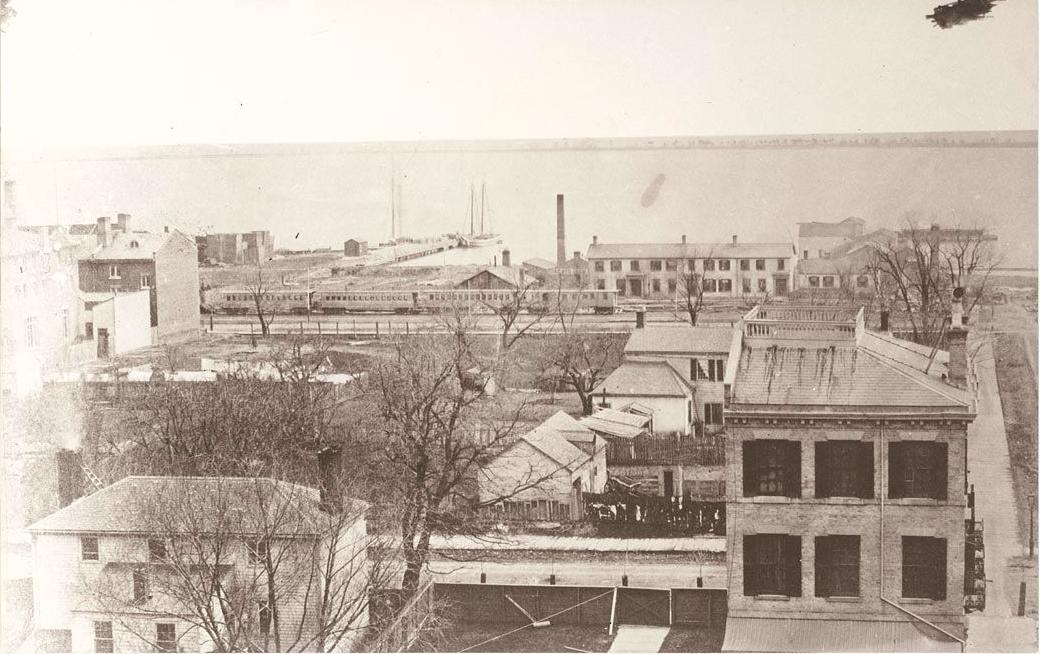
Looking south towards the Toronto Harbour. A train can be seen along the railway

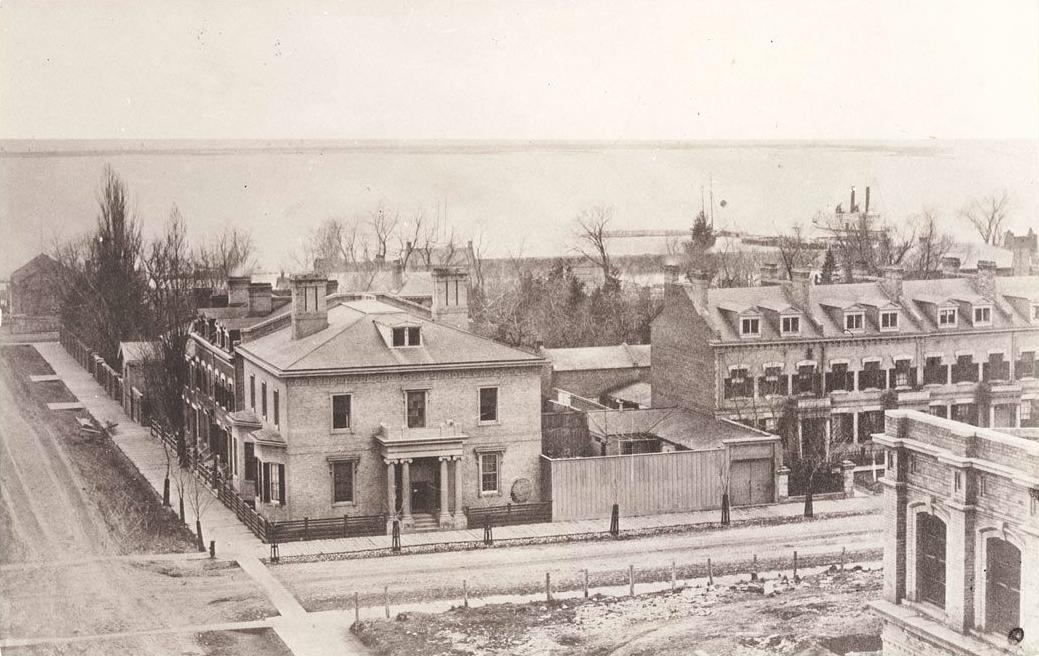
Looking south south west.

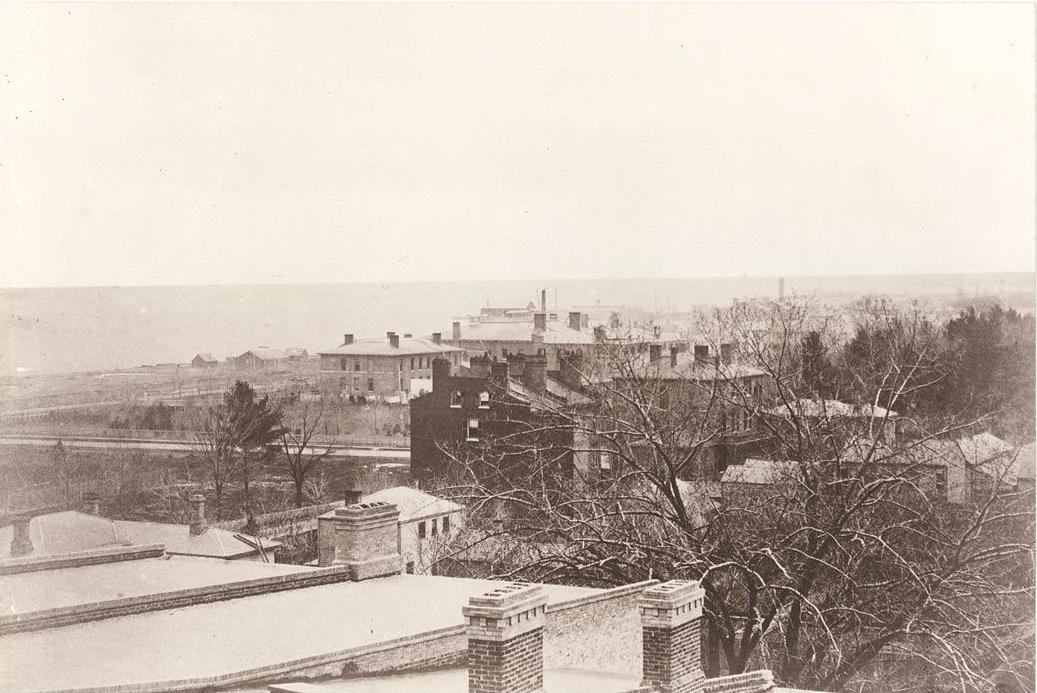
Looking south west. What was then the Provincial Parliament can be seen.

== See also ==
- Edwin Whitefield's 1854 lithograph of Toronto
