= Thomas Canfield Pomphrey =

Scottish architect

- Born: November 29, 1881
- Died: March 8, 1966 (aged 84)
- Education: Hamilton Academy Glasgow School of Art
- Occupation: Architect

Thomas Canfield Pomphrey (29 November 1881 – 8 March 1966) was a Scottish architect.

== Family ==
Thomas Canfield Pomphrey was born in Wishaw, Scotland, to parents Marion and William Pomphrey. His father worked as a printer and stationer.

== Education and career ==
Pomphrey was a pupil at Hamilton Academy, and later a student of architecture at The Glasgow School of Art in 1903 & 1904, after which he trained under Alexander Cullen, the Glaswegian architect. He left Scotland in 1906, emigrating to Toronto, Canada. He worked for a number of firms, including the architects John Lyle, and Darling & Pearson.

He moved to New York in 1909, where he was employed by Clinton & Russell, and took evening classes at Henry Hornbostel's workshop. Pomphrey returned to Toronto in 1912.”

Following his military service during the first world war, he worked as a staff architect for Gore, Naismith and Storrie. In 1924, in collaboration with William Ferguson, the pair won the competition for the Great War Cenotaph in Toronto.

Other notable designs include the Victoria Park filtration plant (unofficial name for R.C. Harris Water Treatment Plant from 1932-1945), the portal and valve house at St Clair Reservoir, and the Parkdale Pumping Station (designed 1938 and built in the 1950s). Over this project Pomphrey had considerable influence. The brainchild of Toronto's Commissioner of Works, Ronald Caldwell Harris, the Toronto Water Works Extension Project (TWWE) was Harris's grand vision of a Toronto water supply system "set within beautiful public parks and linked to a grand system of boulevards and bridges encircling the city." When detailed work began in 1927 R. C. Harris insisted on overseeing every stage of the process. It was his review of the preliminary drawings for the filtration plant at Victoria Park that provoked a strong letter criticising the quality of architectural expression. "The buildings as shown on the perspective sketch appear to me to be plain and unattractive". It was this letter that led the engineering firm Gore, Naismith & Storrie to work with their staff architect, Thomas Canfield Pomphrey, for a substantial time on a large ink-and-wash rendering of the building. It was this drawing that helped to set the vision of the project, and gave Pomphrey a position of power and influence with the Commissioner R. C. Harris.

In 1931, Pomphrey became a member of the Ontario Association of Architects.

Pomphrey is listed on the Glasgow School of Art's World War One Roll of Honour.

== Military service ==
Pomphrey fought in the First World War as a member of the Canadian Overseas Expeditionary Forces, retiring in July 1947, after which he returned to Scotland. In June 1916, he suffered an extensive injury to his right shoulder from a shell fragment, which also broke his right hand. As a result, he spent a year in various hospitals in France, England and Scotland, and had to re-learn to draw, using only one hand. Pomphrey did well to recover his career but he did move out of high architecture to work where engineering was usually more important.

Pomphrey took his Oath of Service in Toronto on 5 April 1915. He served with the 35th Battalion. By 1917, he was a Corporal with the 14th Battalion. His service number was 404427. According to medical records, he received a gunshot wound to the right axilla near Ypres on 3 June 1916 and was first treated in late 1916. This wound left him with a 25% limitation in elevation of the arm and most muscles in his hand atrophied. He was recommended to be returned invalid to Canada; this was accepted 16 April 1917. He was discharged on 30 May 1918; his final pay cheque was in the amount of $88.40. He was single at the time of his military service and was noted to have a "very good character and conduct" while in the service. At time of discharge, he was serving with the 1st Quebec Regiment of the 35th Battalion.

Prior to enlisting, he was earning $1500 yearly as an architect, being self-employed and working for Darling and Pearson.
