= Rossin House Hotel =

Former hotel in downtown Toronto

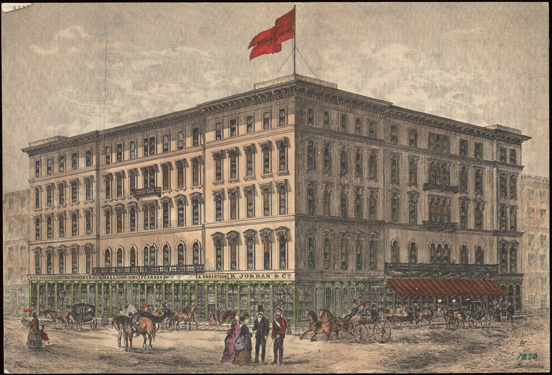
- Rossin House Hotel, 1870

General information
- Status: Demolished
- Type: Hotel
- Location: King Street East & York Street, Toronto, Ontario, Canada
- Coordinates: 43.6478°N 79.3830°W
- Completed: 1857
- Opened: 1857
- Renovated: 1863
- Demolished: 1969

Technical details
- Floor count: 5

Rossin House Hotel was a mid-19th century hotel located at the southeast corner of King Street and York Street in Toronto, Canada. The original structure was built in 1856-1857 (corner was occupied by Chewitt Building) and was destroyed by a fire and re-built in 1863. It was one of the city's pre-eminent hotels, with one 1866 guide claiming, "What the Fifth Avenue Hotel is to New York, and the Windsor is to Montreal, so the celebrated Rossin House is to Toronto."

The five-storey hotel was renamed the Prince George Hotel in 1909 after the future monarch, George V. It was demolished in 1969 to make way for the architect Mies van der Rohe's Toronto-Dominion Centre, with the corner being further developed in 1984 for The Standard Life Centre.

== Upscale ==
While it is always difficult to define what exactly constitutes "upscale", a surviving dinner menu from Friday, April 9, 1869, with its wine list, provides a valuable insight and is striking when it is considered that only 50 years earlier, Toronto was a muddy imperial backwater. The list includes a selection of Bordeaux "claret" wines, such as a "Barton & Gestier Château Margaux 1847" at $3 a bottle (approximately equivalent to $80 today). Champagnes included Moët et Chandon's "Green Seal" (aka "Grand Imperial") for $2.50, which was considered an example of "the best of the best"; for comparison, Moët et Chandon premium Dom Pérignon Champagne retailed in 2008 for approximately $220 CDN.

== Notes ==
The famous 1856–57 panorama photos of Toronto by Armstrong, Beere & Hime – some of the earliest known photos of the city – were taken from the roof of the Rossin House. These photos include views of Toronto's harbour, its early railways, Osgoode Hall, its street and typical architecture of the day – a must-see for those curious about Toronto's history.

== Popular culture ==
Josef Gungl wrote a piano piece entitled the "Rossin House Gallop".
