= George Monro (politician) =

Businessman and political figure in Canada West

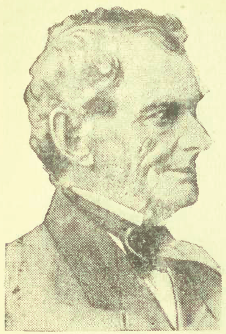

6th Mayor of Toronto
- In office 1841–1841
- Preceded by: John Powell
- Succeeded by: Henry Sherwood

Personal details
- Born: 1801 Scotland
- Died: January 5, 1878 (aged 76–77) Toronto, Ontario
- Spouse(s): Christine Fisher, m. 1822
- Relations: John Monro, brother
- Children: Two sons (including George Monro b. 1831) and four daughters (including Amy Gordon Monro)
- Occupation: Merchant

George Monro (1801 – January 5, 1878) was a businessman and political figure in Upper Canada/Canada West. He was also a member of the Orange Order in Canada.

He was born in Scotland in 1801 and came to Niagara in Upper Canada with his parents. In 1814, he moved to York (Toronto) and entered the grocery business with his brother John Monro; he later struck out on his own sometime around 1824, becoming an importer and wholesaler. His business was regarded as one of the grandest mercantile businesses in town. The business was located on King Street and the building doubled as a residence and store. In 1830 he was one of the founding directors of the Home District Savings Bank of Toronto along with notable local figures like William Warren Baldwin, Jesse Ketchum and A.T. Wood.

He was elected to city council for St. Lawrence’s Ward in 1834 and served as mayor in 1841. He served as a captain in the local militia during the Upper Canada Rebellion. Monro ran unsuccessfully for the legislative assembly in the same year. In 1844, he was defeated by James Edward Small in the 3rd riding of York for the 2nd Parliament of the Province of Canada but was declared elected when Small was disqualified. He was defeated in the next general election in 1848 and he retired from business around 1856.

He died in Toronto in 1878.

== Munro Park ==
George Monro's farm, Painted Post Farm, was a 25 acre property in The Beaches. Part of the property was leased out to the Toronto Railway Company by the Monro family following the ex-Mayor's death and turned into an amusement park that existed from 1896 to 1906. The park was named after Monro despite his name being misspelled and was run by Toronto Railway Company, which also operated the nearby Victoria Park, as a trolley park until the lease expired and the Monro family decided to sell the land to property developers to build a new residential subdivision.

The amusement park included a Ferris wheel, dance pavilion, merry-go-round, outdoor motion picture shows, performances including acrobats, animal acts including an ostrich farm, comedians, magicians, and musical performers. Acts from Britain and the United States were booked including minstrel shows, vaudeville shows, and operas.

The site has since become a residential area and areas along the lake are now part of the Beaches Park. One of the neighbourhood's streets, Munro Park Avenue, is named after the amusement park. It was one of three east end amusement parks, nearby Victoria Park also closed in 1906. Scarboro Beach Amusement Park opened in 1907 and operated until 1925.

== Personal ==
Monro's grandson Neville Fisher Monro married Ethel Muriel Gooderham, great-grand-daughter of Gooderham and Worts's William Gooderham Sr.
