= Augustus Bridle =

British home child and founder of The Arts and Letters Club of Toronto

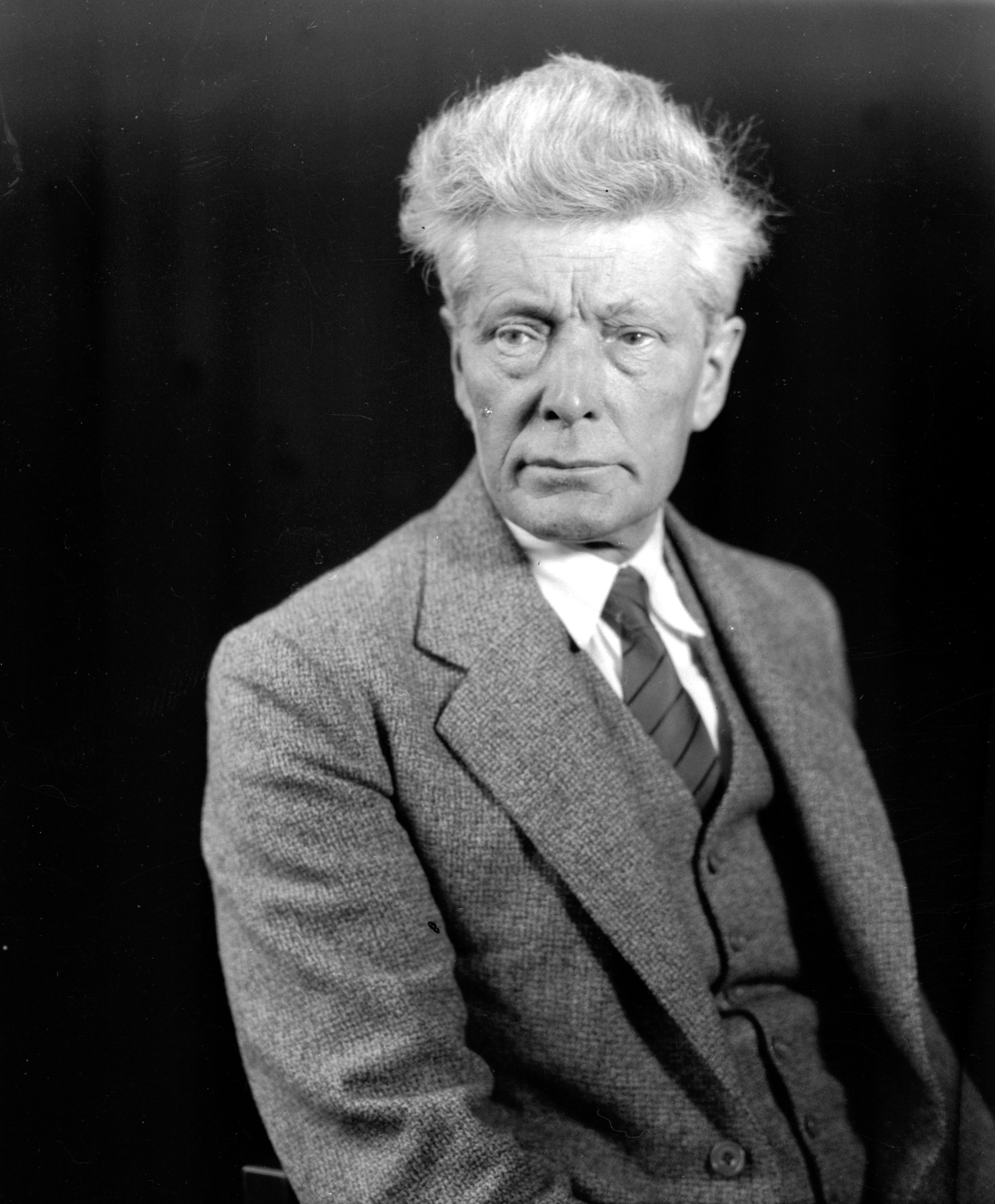
- Portrait taken in 1929, from the M.O. Hammond fonds held at the Archives of Ontario.
- Born: Augustus John Bridle; 4 March 1868; Cann, Dorset, England
- Died: 21 December 1952 (aged 84); Toronto, Ontario, Canada
- Occupations: Writer, critic, editor
- Known for: Founder of The Arts and Letters Club of Toronto
- Children: 3, including Paul Augustus Bridle

Augustus Bridle (4 March 1868 – 21 December 1952) was a Canadian journalist and author.

== Biography ==
Bridle was born in the village of Cann in southern England. He was part of the British home child program and was sent to Canada in 1878 by National Children's Home (now known as Action for Children). After working on Ontario farms as a young boy, he went on to study at the University of Toronto, where he graduated with a gold medal in classics.

He began his career in journalism with the Edmonton Bulletin while living at Edmonton, Alberta from 1900 to 1901. He returned to Ontario in 1901, where he continued in newspaper work as a writer, first for the Stratford Herald and later for the Toronto News. In 1908 he became the associate editor of the Canadian Courier, a national weekly magazine published in Toronto, continuing in this position until 1916 when he became editor. He later joined the staff of the Toronto Daily Star in 1922, and served the newspaper for 30 years as music critic, book reviewer, and film and drama editor.

In 1908, he became the founding member of The Arts and Letters Club of Toronto, which was noted as being a meeting place for the members of the Group of Seven.

Bridle was the author of several books, including A Backwoods Christmas (Toronto 1910), Sons of Canada (Toronto 1916), Masques of Ottawa (Toronto 1921), Hansen: A Novel of Canadianization (Toronto 1924), and The Story of the Club (Toronto 1945).

== Works ==
- A Backwoods Christmas, (1910)
- Sons Of Canada, (1916)
- The Masques Of Ottawa, (1921) [written as: Domino]
- Hansen: A Novel Of Canadianization, (1924)
- The Story Of The Club, (1945) (Arts and Letters Club of Toronto)
- The Old 24th Of May
