= Arts and Letters Club of Toronto =

The Arts and Letters Club of Toronto
- Founded: 1908; 118 years ago
- Type: Private members' club
- Location(s): 14 Elm Street Toronto, Ontario, Canada
- Website: artsandlettersclub.ca

The Arts and Letters Club of Toronto is a private members' club in Toronto, Ontario, which brings together writers, architects, musicians, painters, graphic artists, actors and others working in or with a love of the arts and letters. It was founded in 1908 as a gentlemen's club, but women have been members since 1985 and now make up half of the club.

== History and background ==
The club was founded in 1908 by journalist Augustus Bridle, who arranged a first meeting on 23 March 1908. At a meeting on 14 May the motion to give the club its name was moved by E. Wyly Grier; The Globe reported "it is the intention of the members of the club to seek among themselves a genial companionship, and to increase sympathy between the various branches of the arts." The first official meeting of the club was in late October 1908.

Events moved from place to place until late 1909, when the club moved to its first home at 42 King St. East, above the Brown Betty Tea Rooms. In 1910 it moved to 57 Adelaide St. East, on the second floor of the County of York Courthouse. In 1920 it moved to its present quarters at St. George's Hall at 14 Elm Street, which it rented until 1986 when it bought the building.

== St. George's Hall ==
St. George's Hall
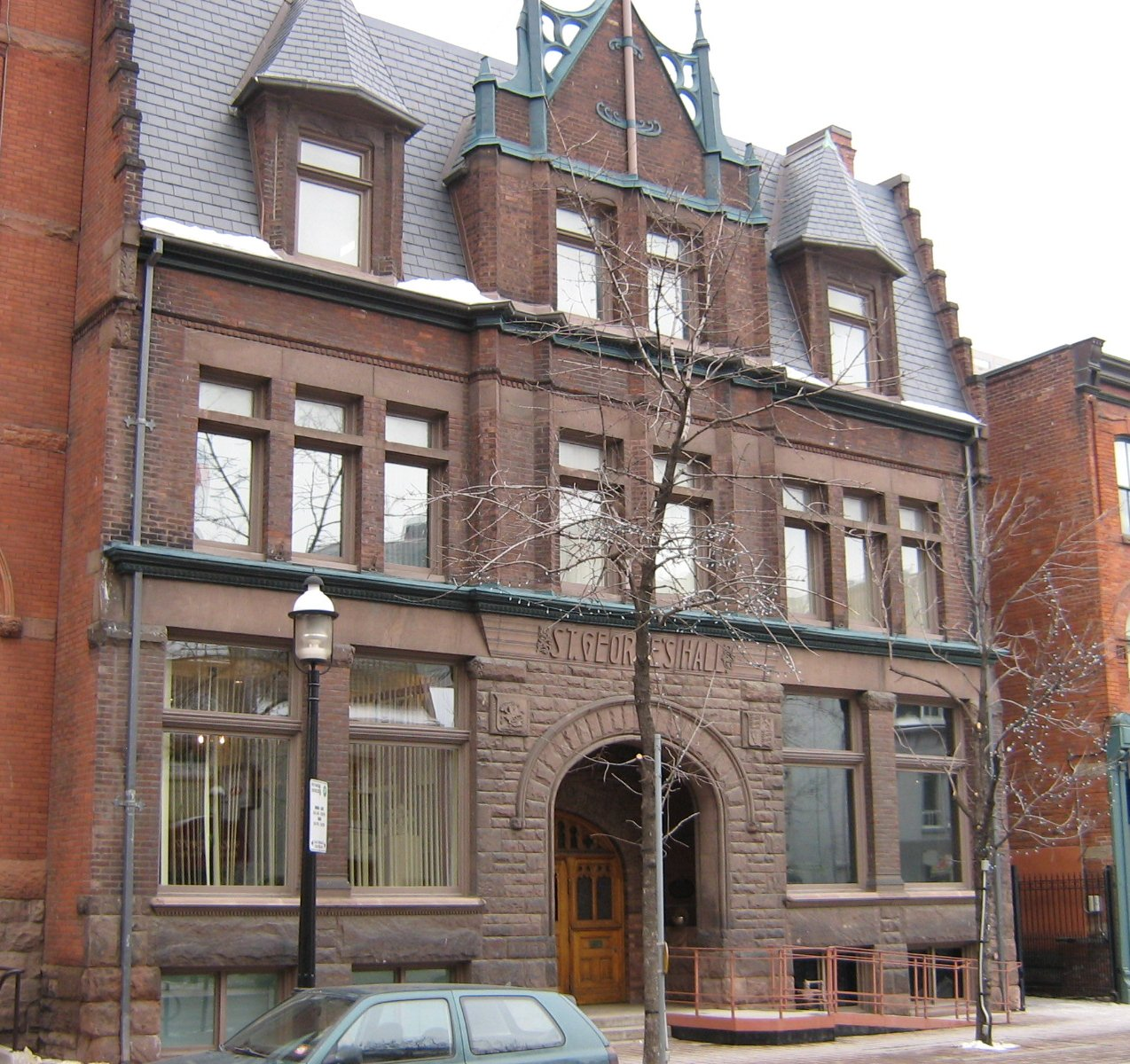
- Front of the building in 2007
- Interactive map of St. George's Hall
- Location: 14 Elm Street; Toronto, Ontario, Canada

History
- Built: 1891
- Built for: St. George’s Society
- Original use: Settlement house

Site notes
- Architect(s): Edwards & Webster (1891), Sproatt & Rolph (1920 alterations)
- Current use: Private club (since 1920)
- Owner: The Arts and Letters Club of Toronto

National Historic Site of Canada
- Designated: 2007

Ontario Heritage Act
- Designated: 1975

The club is located in a historic building (known as St. George's Hall) at 14 Elm Street in downtown Toronto. It is protected under Part IV of the Ontario Heritage Act, designated by the City of Toronto since 1975. In 2007 its premises were designated a National Historic Site of Canada. It is open to the public most Fridays from 4 to 7 and during Doors Open Toronto.

The building has been described as "an eclectic blend of architectural styles popular at the end of the nineteenth century, combining elements of Romanesque, Flemish, and medieval architecture." When the club moved to the building in 1920 it made numerous renovations, including new windows and a large stone fireplace in the neo-Gothic Great Hall. It now has a lounge, two meeting rooms, library, art studio, and a two-story Great Hall for concerts, plays, lectures and meals.

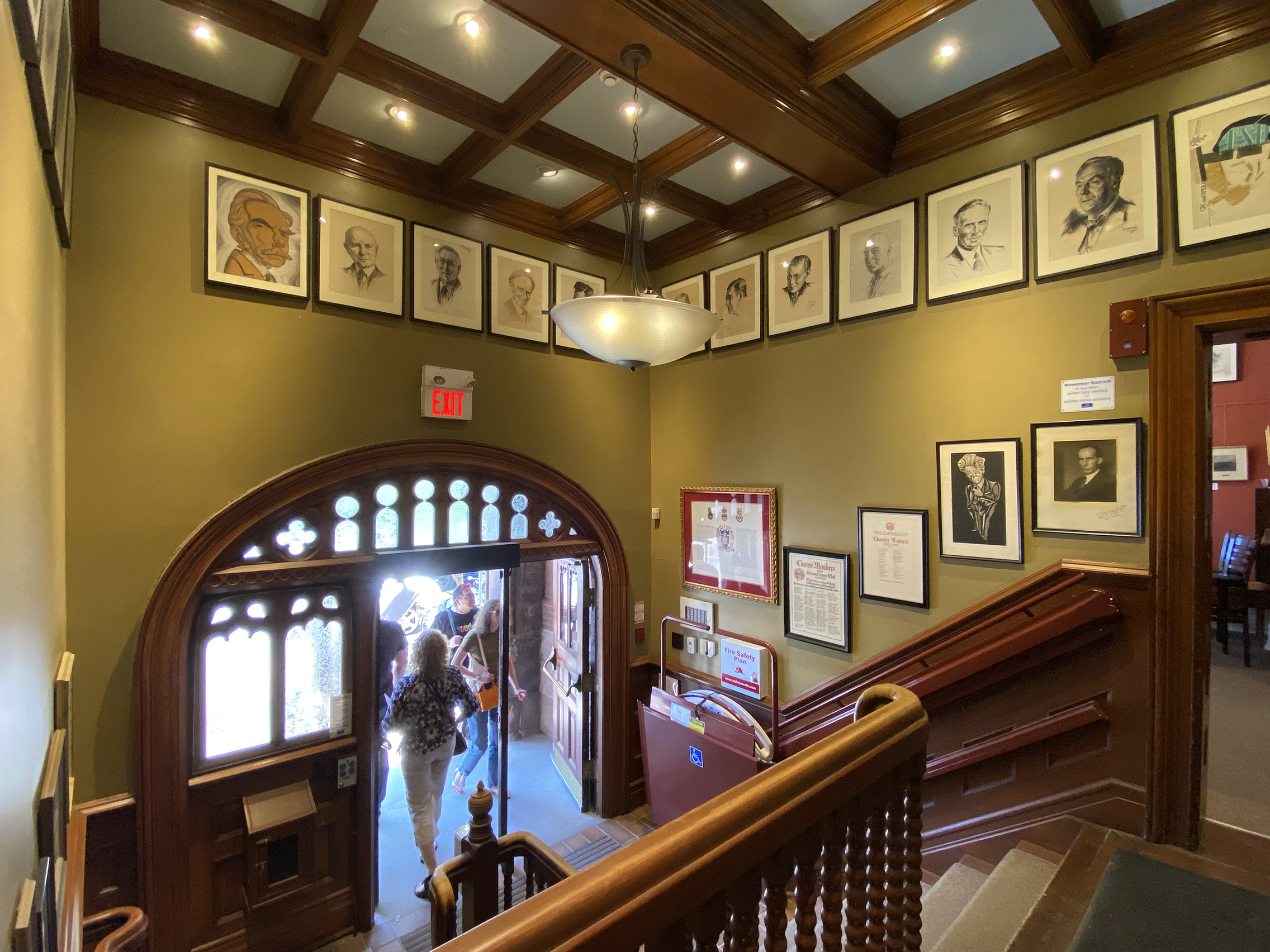
Entrance foyer

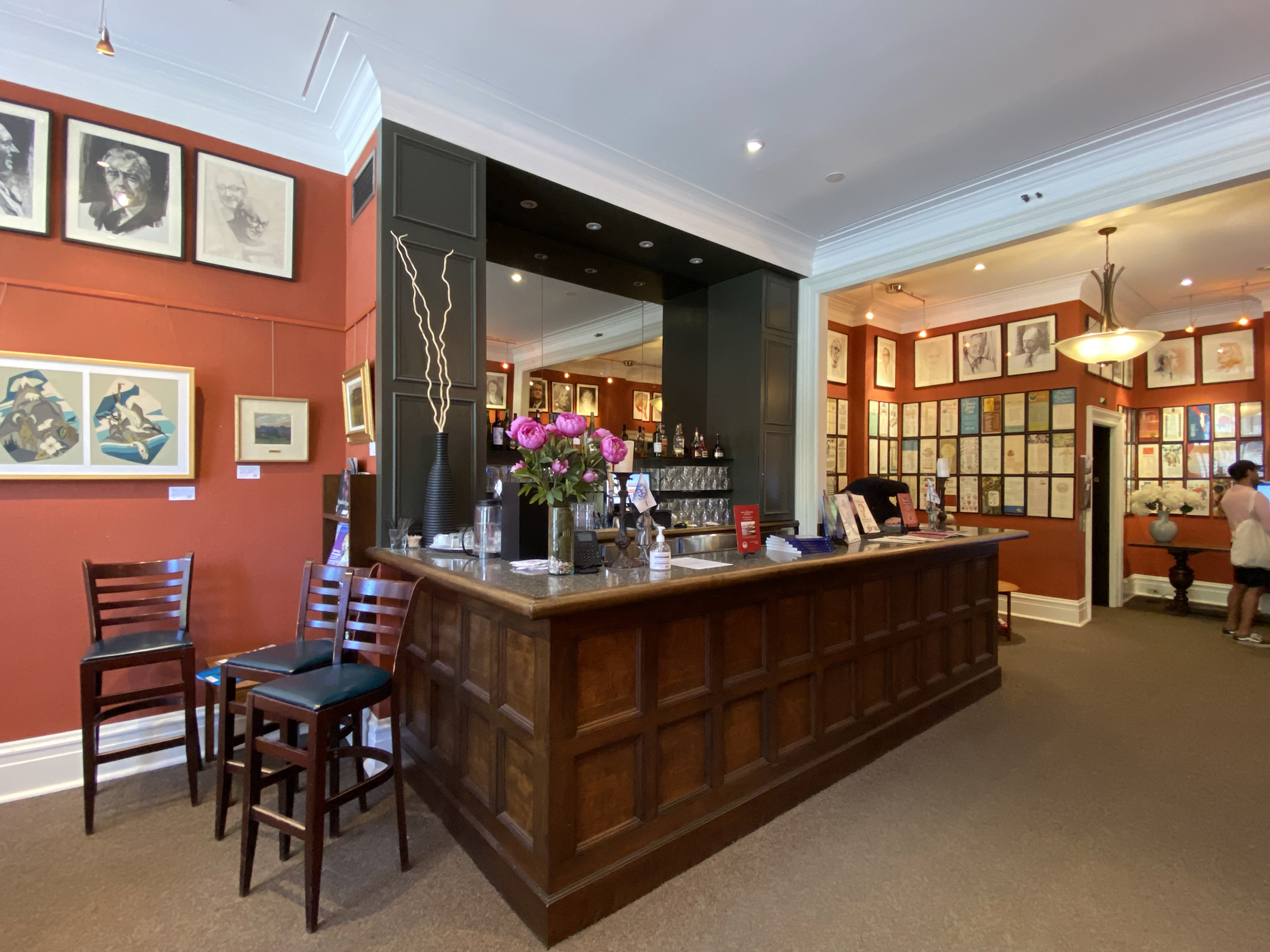
Bar on the main floor

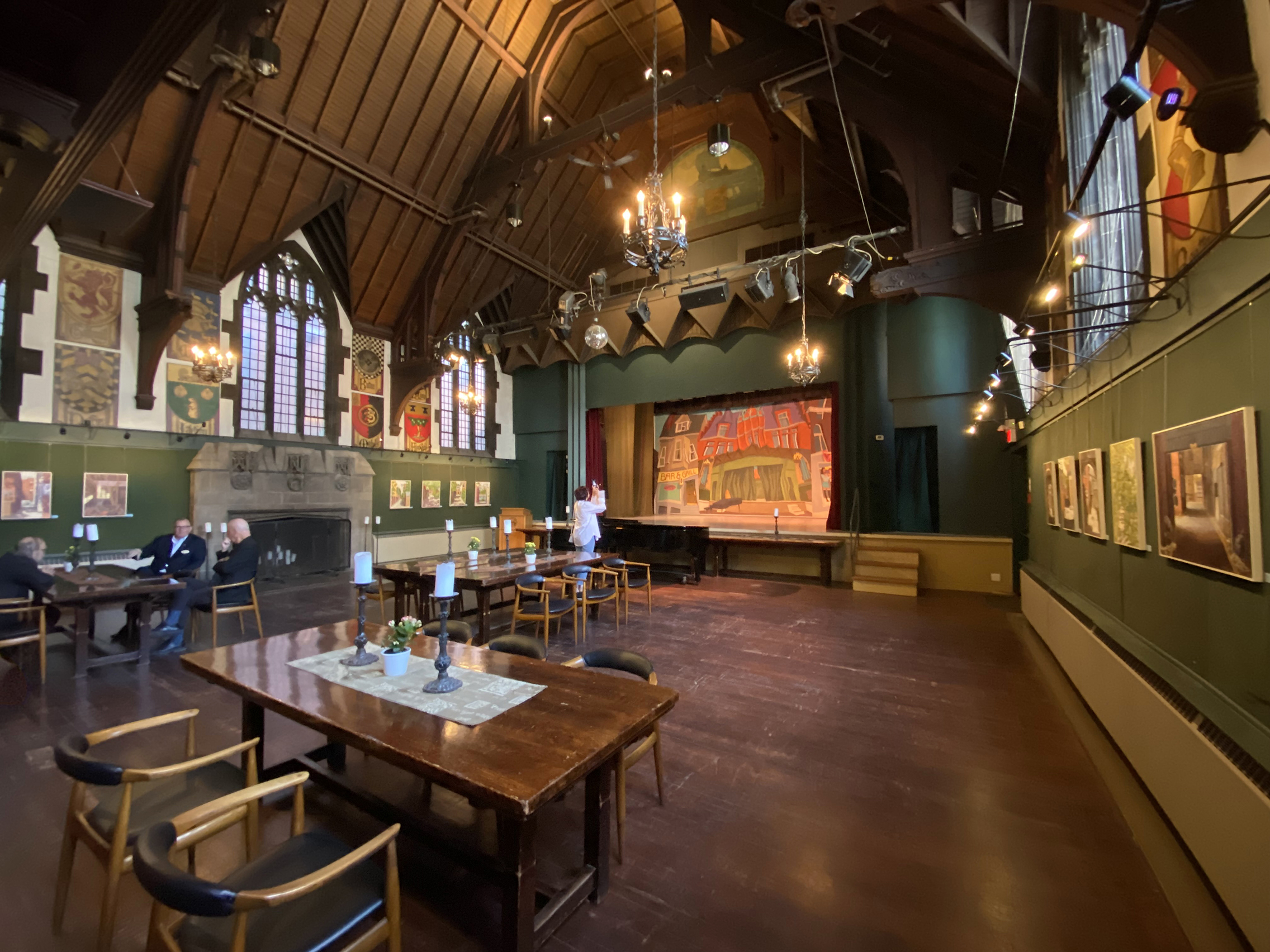
Great Hall

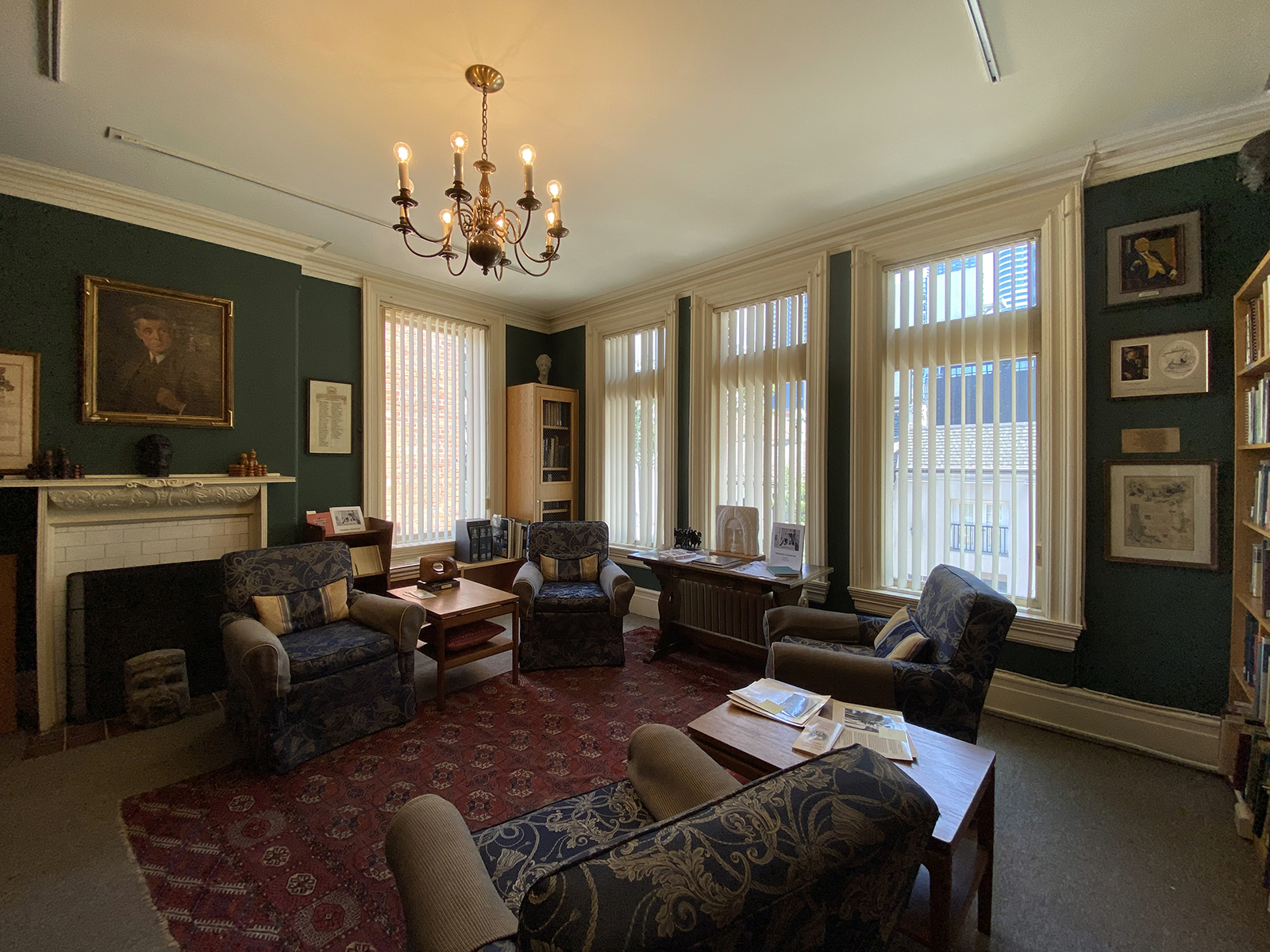
Reading Room

== Cultural influence ==
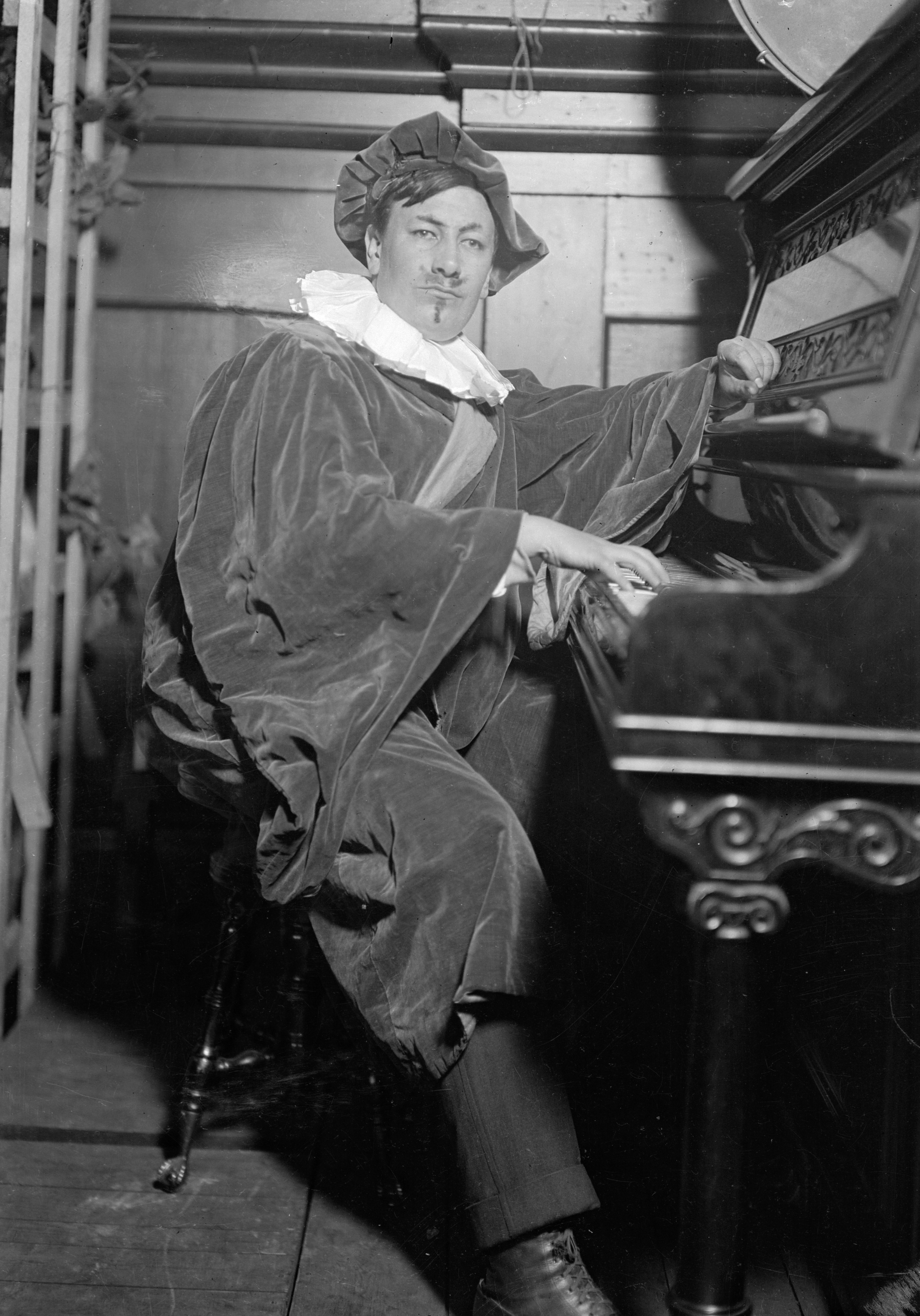
“Beaupre's Tableau” at the Arts and Letters Club, Toronto, taken in November 1913, from the M.O. Hammond fonds held at the Archives of Ontario.

The club has been an important part of Canadian cultural life since its founding, and "many of the key figures in a number of the arts organizations being created in the first half of the twentieth century in Toronto were members of the Club."

When Rupert Brooke visited Toronto in 1913, Edmund Morris brought him to lunch at the club, "five years old and the centre of Canadian literary and cultural life. The nucleus that would form the Group of Seven met in the club's rooms."

Founding member Roy Mitchell staged a number of theatrical productions at the club between 1911 and 1915 that "introduced skeptical Toronto audience to the principles of theatrical modernism.". In 1919 he worked with fellow member Vincent Massey on the creation of the Hart House Theatre and became its first artistic director.

In the 1920s the club "helped draw together Toronto's artistic and intellectual community; it was favoured by journalists, poets, musicians and bookmen, as well as by the Group of Seven and other artists." In 1927 it hosted a show of work by Bertram Brooker that was the first solo exhibition of abstract art in Canada.

In the 1940s members of the club played a role in the creation of the Canadian Arts Council, which in 1958 became the Canadian Conference of the Arts. John Coulter instigated an advisory council on government support for the arts at the club in 1943, and in April 1944 he, Herman Voaden and others went to Ottawa to meet with James Gray Turgeon, chair of the House of Commons Special Committee on Reconstruction and Re-establishment. In June a group of members represented the club and went to Ottawa with fifteen other arts organizations to lobby the government. As a result, in December 1945 the Canadian Arts Council was formed, with Voaden as its first president. Involvement with Canadian arts policy continued when in 1949 Vincent Massey chaired the Massey Commission, which led to the creation of the Canada Council in 1957 when he was Governor-General. Club member Claude Bissell was its second chair.

== Theosophy ==
In the club's early years several members were Theosophists, such as Albert E. S. Smythe (first president of the Toronto Theosophical Society), Lawren Harris (who later wrote articles such as "Theosophy and Art") and Roy Mitchell (whose books include Theosophy in Action). Mitchell staged plays at the Club with the Arts and Letters Players (and later at Hart House Theatre and in New York) that were informed by his Theosophist views. Early productions at the club "reveal the influence of Theosophical ideas upon formal experimentation—as well as a pervasive sense of fun and an interdisciplinary approach to the performing arts."

Connections continued with other members through the years. Artist Eric Aldwinckle was "active in the Theosophical Society" as of 1942 and in 1950 published Two Fables with the Theosophical Press.

== Members ==
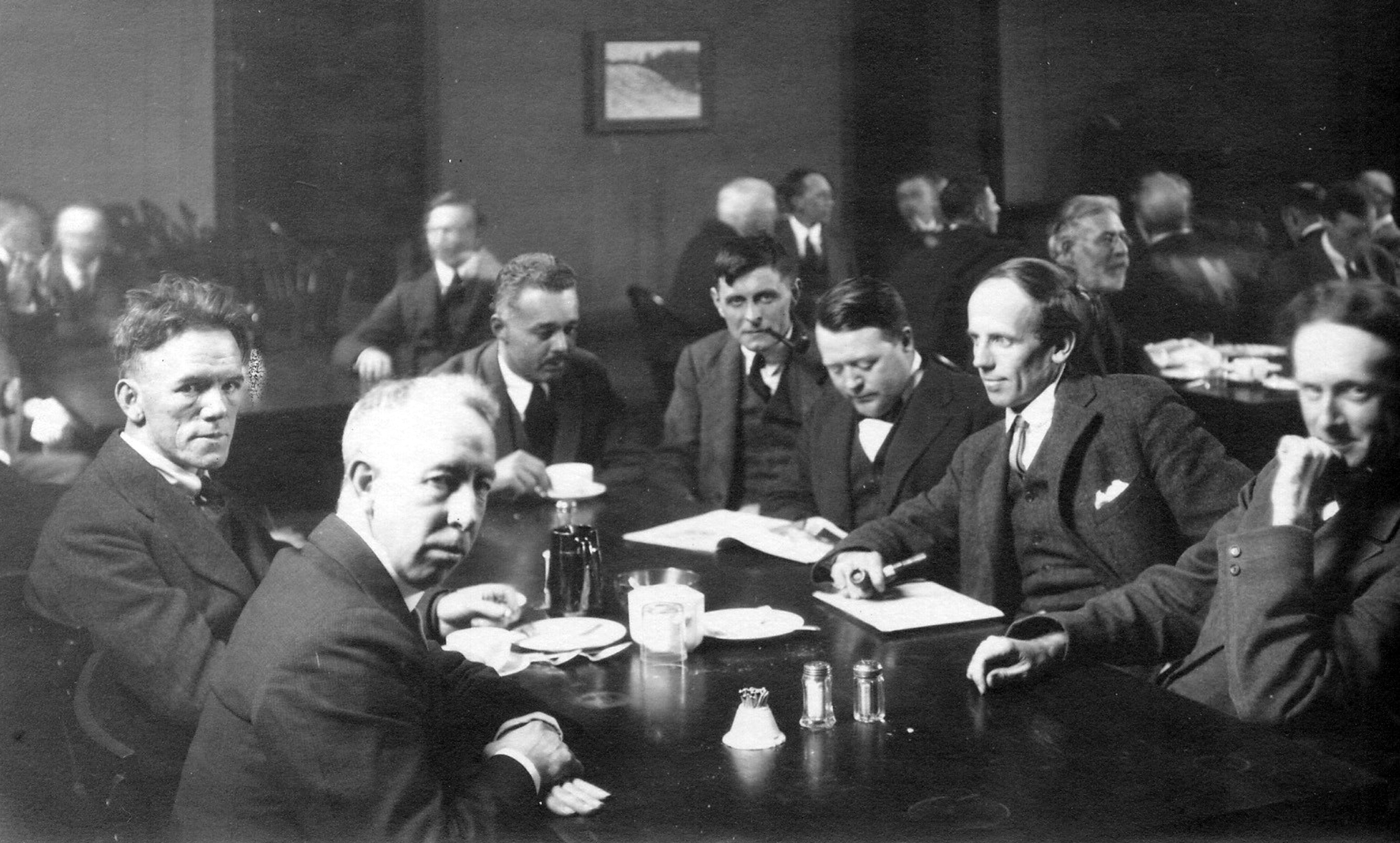
Arthur Goss photo of the Group of Seven at the club. From left: Varley, Jackson, Harris, friend Barker Fairley, Johnston, Lismer, MacDonald. Missing: Carmichael.

Aside from the Group of Seven and others mentioned above, well-known members of the club include Hector Charlesworth, Robertson Davies, M. O. Hammond, George Locke, Charles William Jefferys, Mavor Moore and Owen Staples.

Since its founding, two club members have become Nobel laureates (Frederick Banting, "one of Canada's most accomplished amateur painters," and John Macleod), six have been knighted (including Banting and MacMillan) and, since 1967, more than 150 have been named to the Order of Canada, including Betty Oliphant, Joyce Wieland and Ezra Schabas.

== Events ==
The club's artistic life revolves around its "LAMPS" disciplines: Literature, Architecture, Music, Painting, and Stage (originally Sculpture). These are very broadly defined and include photography, all performing arts, screenwriting, urban planning and other related fields. The Club welcomes both professional members, whose careers have been associated with one or more of these, and non-professional members, who appreciate and support the arts. Events offered by the Club include meals followed by a concert or a speaker, stage performances, studio painting sessions with models, film showings, monthly art exhibitions, and meetings of groups interested in photography, writing and poetry.

The annual Boar's Head Dinner is believed to be the oldest event of its kind in North America, and the Club's constitution is unique in that every year it is sung at the annual general meeting to music specially composed by Healey Willan.

== Archives ==
The club's archives contains a wide variety of original material documenting membership and activities since its founding. The archives are open to scholars, historians, and other researchers. Thirty-four boxes of documents dating back to the founding of the club are stored at the Thomas Fisher Rare Book Library.

== See also ==
- List of gentlemen's clubs in Canada
