= John Powell (Canadian politician) =

Canadian politician (1809–1881)

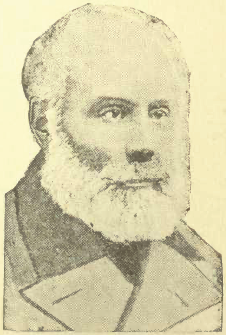

5th Mayor of Toronto
- In office 1838–1840
- Preceded by: George Gurnett
- Succeeded by: George Monro

Personal details
- Born: June 19, 1809 Niagara, Upper Canada
- Died: February 24, 1881 (aged 71) Lincoln County, Ontario

John Powell (June 19, 1809 – February 24, 1881) was a Canadian politician who served as mayor of Toronto and played an important role in the Upper Canada Rebellion. Powell was a member of the "Family Compact," the small group of elite families that controlled the politics of Upper Canada in the first half of the nineteenth century. His father, Captain John Powell, was the son-in-law of General Æneas Shaw and his grandfather was Chief Justice William Dummer Powell. He was also a member of the Orange Order in Canada.

== Background ==
A lawyer by training, in the 1837 elections Powell was elected alderman for St. Andrew's Ward, which then covered the area between King and Queen Streets west of Yonge and east of Bathurst. When former mayor William Lyon Mackenzie attempted to foment a rebellion against the Compact and Governor Sir Francis Bond Head, Powell became an important member of the forces opposing him.

On the night of December 4, Powell and companion Archibald Macdonald left the central part of town to investigate the reports of rebel activities to the north. Unbeknownst to them the rebels had captured a local armoury and were based at Montgomery's Tavern, preparing to march south. Powell and Macdonald were captured by a rebel patrol, led by Mackenzie himself. However, before they could be brought to the rebel headquarters Powell pulled a hidden pistol from his coat. He killed one of his captors, Captain Anthony Anderson, and made good his escape. He shot point blank at Mackenzie but the pistol misfired and the rebel leader was unharmed. Powell returned to town and warned the government forces about the rebel preparations. This advance warning played an important role in the eventual defeat of the rebellion.

Powell was proclaimed a hero for his actions and was unanimously elected as mayor by the city council at the end of the year. Powell served three years as mayor of the city. His main preoccupation was security, organizing local militias in each ward and expanding the small police force to help suppress future disorder. After his time as mayor, he served one more year on city council before retiring from local politics. In 1844 he left Toronto to become registrar of Lincoln County and he resided there until his death in 1881.
