= City of Toronto Archives =

Municipal archives for Toronto, Ontario, Canada

- Municipal wordmark

Division overview
- Formed: 1960
- Headquarters: 255 Spadina Road Toronto, Ontario M5R 2V3
- Division executive: Evan Alexiou, Toronto City Archivist
- Parent division: Toronto City Clerk's Office
- Website: Official website

The City of Toronto Archives is the municipal archives for the City of Toronto, Ontario, Canada. It holds records created by the municipal government and its amalgamated former municipalities from 1792 to the present day, as well as non-government records created by private groups and individuals. There are also over one million photographs of Toronto within its collection, with over 50,000 available to view on its website.

== Collection ==
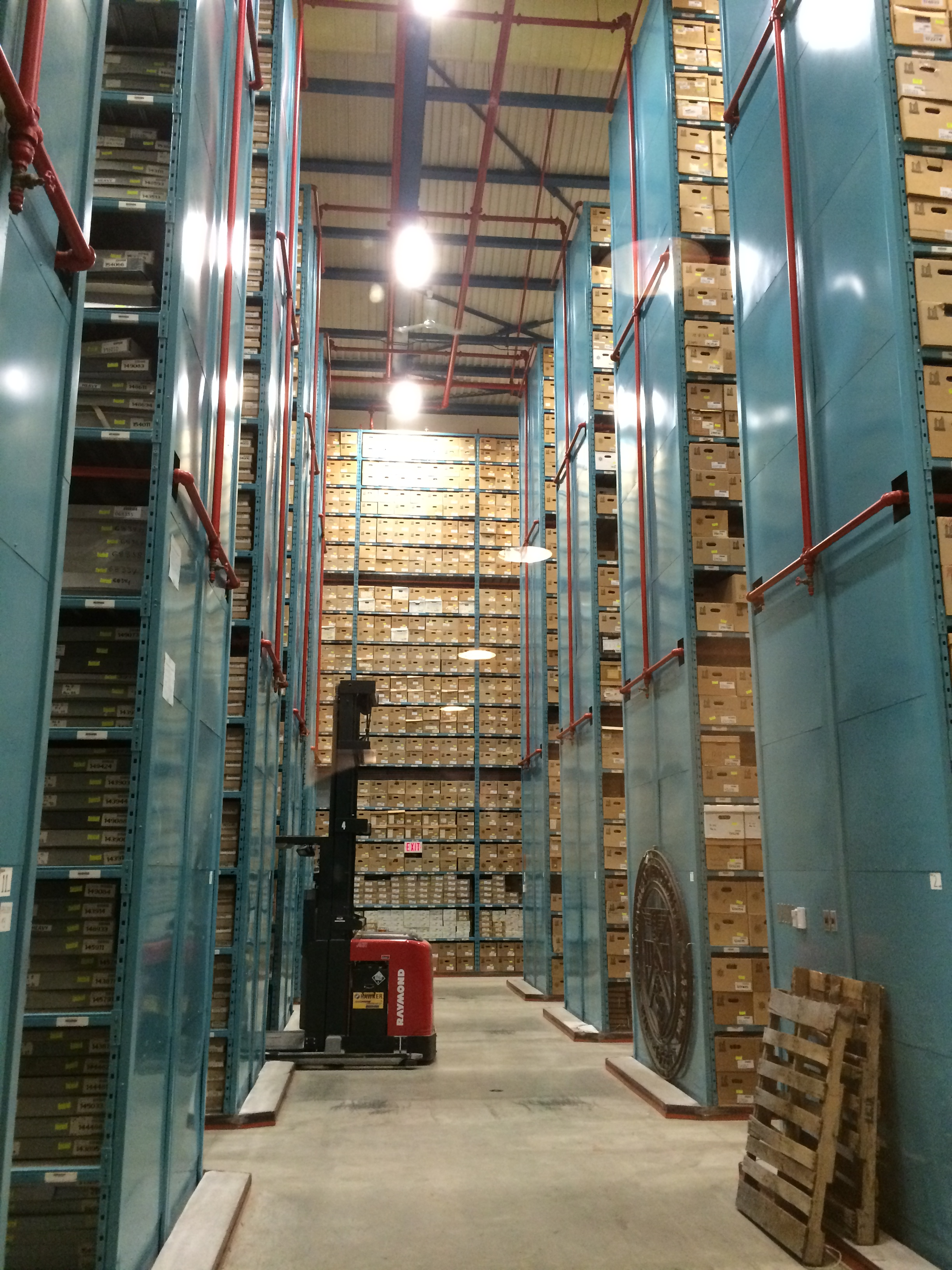
A portion of the City of Toronto Archives holdings

The oldest record in the Archives is a map of Toronto Harbour dated 1792, and the newest one is a DVD of the previous month's Toronto City Council meeting. Of the 1.2 million photographs within the Toronto Archives collection, the oldest are a set of twenty-five prints of the city taken in 1856-57 by the firm of photographers, Armstrong, Beere and Hime. These are the earliest known photographs of Toronto. Other important photographic collections are the William James collection, the Alexander Galbraith collection and the F. W. Micklethwaite collection, The Globe and Mail collection (1922–56), as well as over 100,000 photographs taken by city photographers.

== Building ==
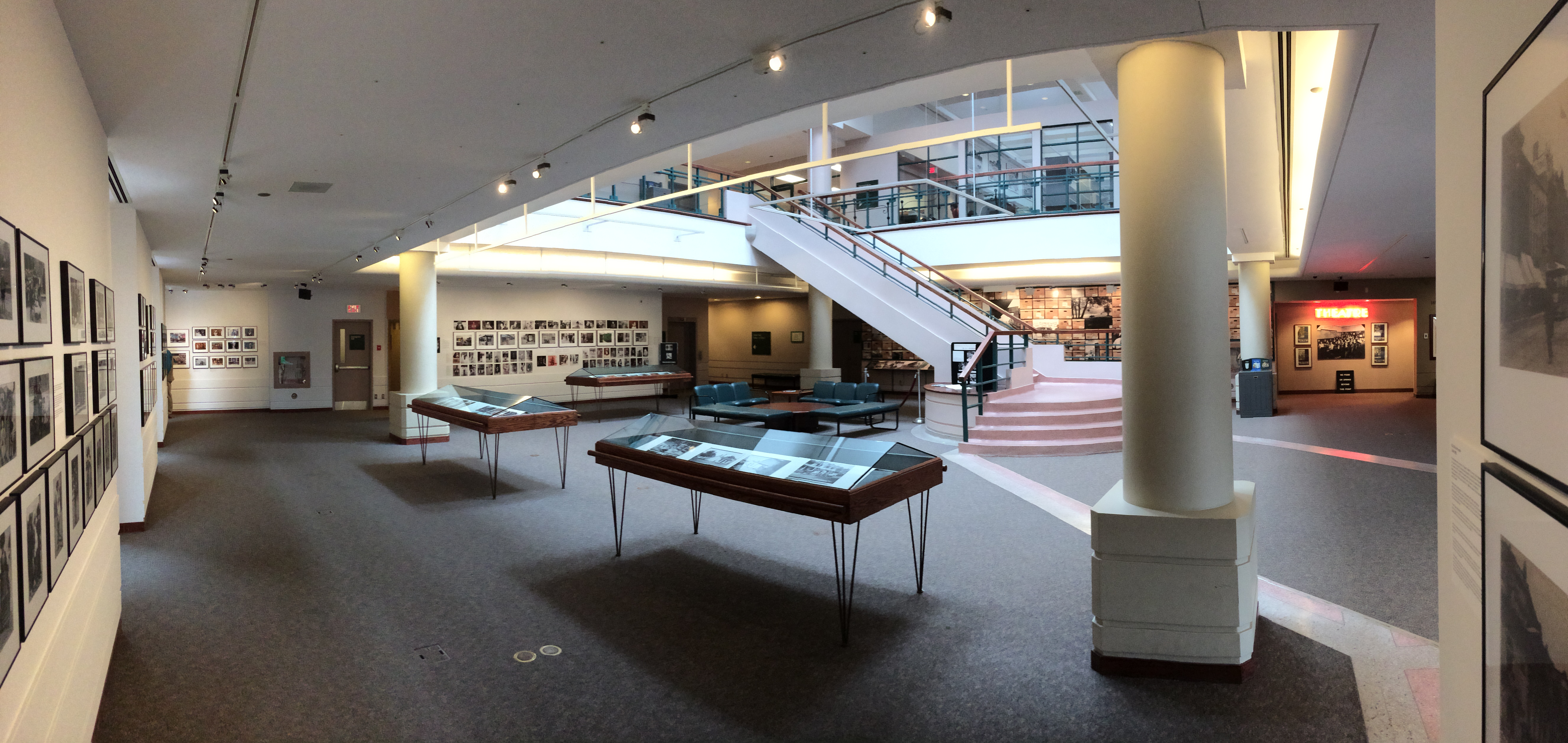
City of Toronto Archives building, main floor

The present archives building was opened in 1992. It was designed by the architectural firm of Zeidler Roberts, who also designed the Toronto Eaton Centre, as a state-of-the-art purpose-built archives building incorporating a climate controlled records, a central atrium and exhibition area; a 60-seat lecture room and a Research Hall.

The original purpose of the building was to hold the records of the government of Metropolitan Toronto. Since amalgamation in 1998, documents from the other six constituent municipalities have been housed there. Prior to amalgamation, the archives were held in the respective city halls.
