= Charles Hastings (Canadian physician) =

Canadian obstetrician and public health pioneer

Charles John Colwell Orr Hastings (23 August 1858 in Markham Township, United Province of Canada – 17 January 1931 in Toronto) was an obstetrician and public health pioneer.

== Biography ==
Raised on a farm in Markham Township just north of Toronto, Hastings received an M.D. from Victoria University, Toronto in 1885 and, in 1886, became a licentiate of the King and Queen’s College of Physicians in Ireland, followed by further studies in Edinburgh and London. He was born August 23, 1858.

== Career ==
Hastings lost his daughter to typhoid because of contaminated milk. At that time, Toronto also had no sewage treatment, and used unchlorinated water from Lake Ontario. In middle age, Hastings switched from a normal career in obstetrics to an outstanding one in public health.

As Toronto's Medical Officer of Health (1910–29) Hastings crusaded to make Toronto the first city in Canada to pasteurize milk. (Note: Denmark instituted compulsory pasteurization in 1898 in an effort to limit the spread of tubercular disease.) He introduced a safe water supply, eliminated privies, helped establish the public-health nursing system, medical and dental inspection in public schools, neighborhood baby clinics, childhood immunizations, and health inspections for homes and restaurants. The improvements lowered Toronto's death rate from communicable diseases from 15.3 per 1000 in 1909 to 10.3 per 1000 in 1925.

== Recognition ==
Hastings became president of the Canadian Public Health Association in 1916 and the American Public Health Association in 1918.

A 193-unit housing cooperative on Elm St., the Charles Hastings Housing Cooperative, was named in Dr. Hastings' honour in 1984. The coop cites his belief that "the foundations for good community health were good housing, clean air and good nutrition".

The Charles Hastings Lecture, an annual public lecture on the social determinants of health honouring Dr. Hastings' legacy, was inaugurated in 2008 by the Toronto Medical Officer of Health, on the following basis: "Dr. Hastings transformed the practice of public health in Toronto. He introduced a safe water supply, initiated childhood immunization, established the public health nursing system, and instituted health inspections of restaurants. By 1922, under his leadership, Toronto had the lowest death rate of any large North American city."
