= December 1919 =

Month in 1919

<<	December 1919					>>
Su	Mo	Tu	We	Th	Fr	Sa
	1	2	3	4	5	6
7	8	9	10	11	12	13
14	15	16	17	18	19	20
21	22	23	24	25	26	27
28	29	30	31

The following events occurred in December 1919:

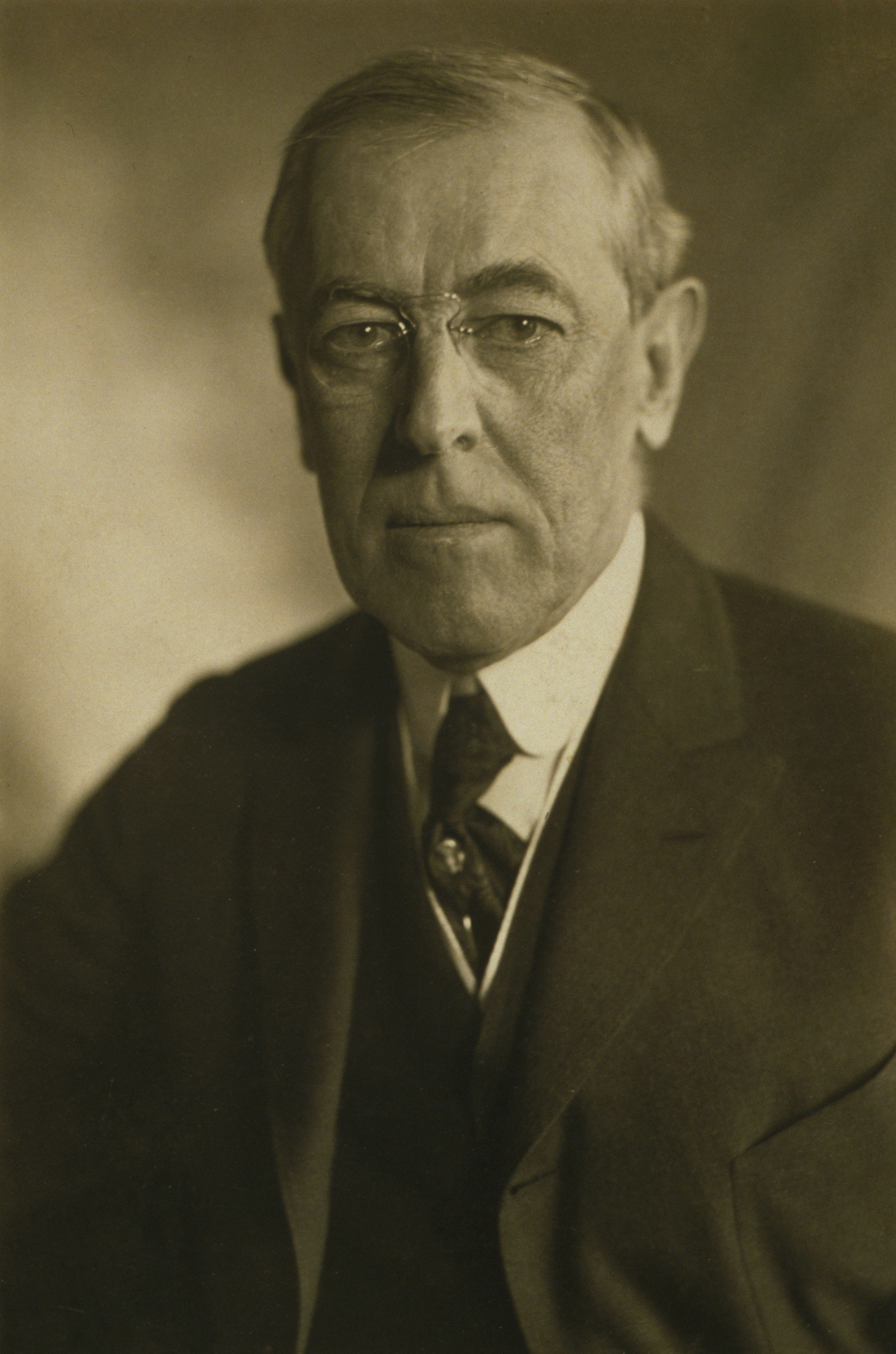
U.S. President Woodrow Wilson receives the Nobel Peace Prize.

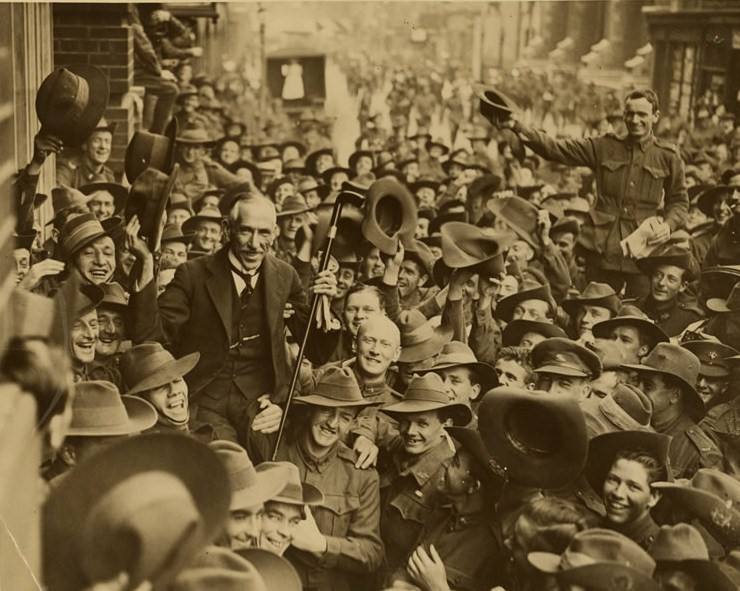
Incumbent Billy Hughes wins the Australian federal election.

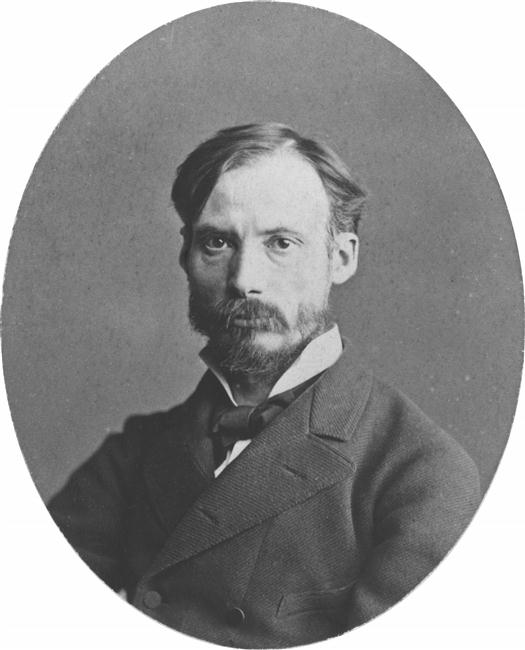
French artist Pierre-Auguste Renoir, who lead the Impressionism movement, dies in France.

== December 1, 1919 (Monday) ==
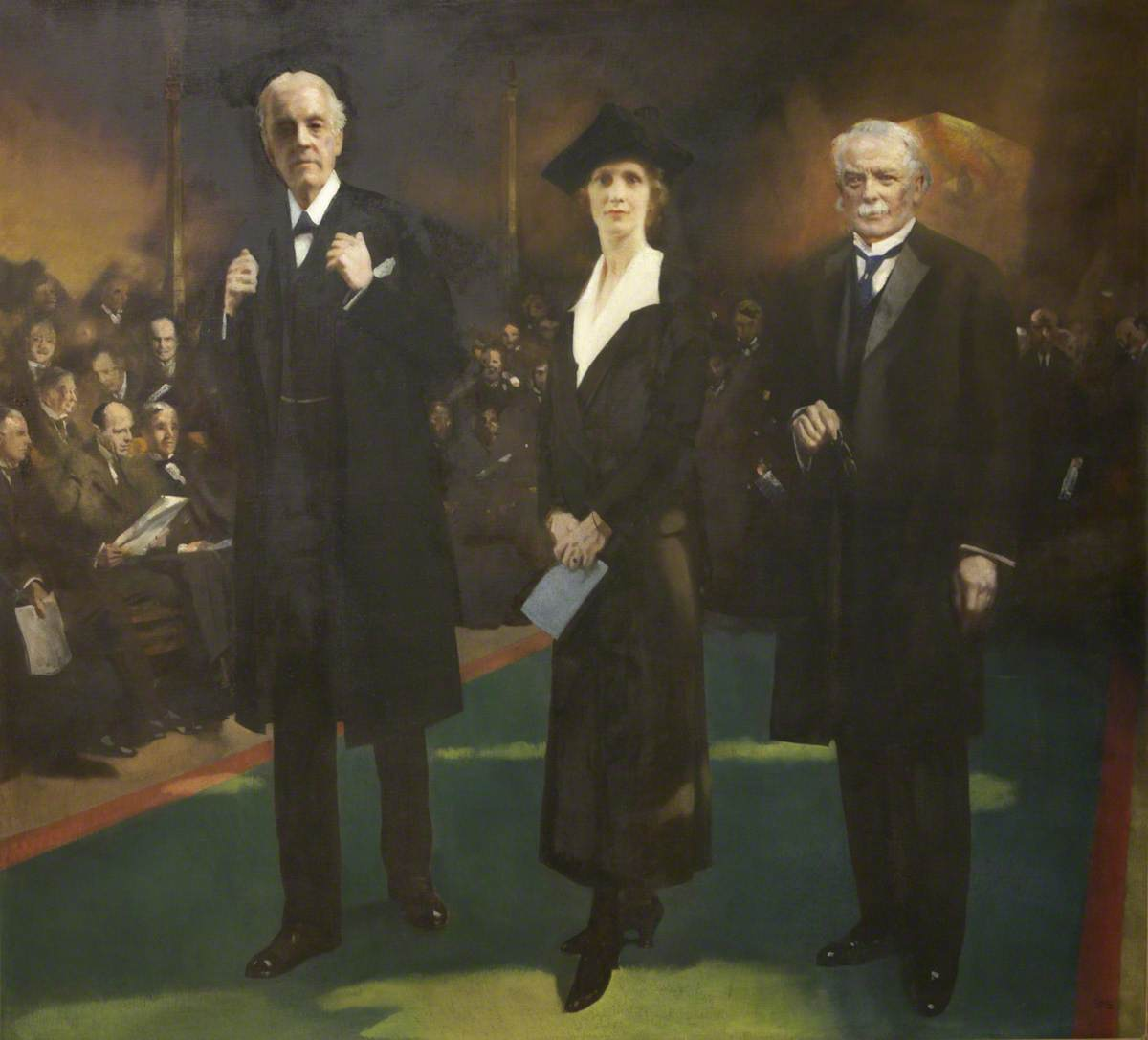
Charles Sims, Introduction of Lady Astor as the First Woman MP, c. 1919, The Box, Plymouth

- Russian Civil War – The Red Army captured Semipalatinsk, Kazakhstan, frustrating the chances of the Orenburg Independent Army under Alexander Dutov from joining up with the main White Army force under Vladimir Kappel who were retreating into Siberia.
- Nancy Astor became the first woman to take her seat in the House of Commons of the United Kingdom, having been the second woman elected to a Member of Parliament seat on November 28. Constance Markievicz was the first woman elected to Parliament in 1918.
- The first cabinet of the Alexandru Vaida-Voevod administration was formed in Romania.
- The first passenger train of the San Diego and Arizona Railway arrived in San Diego from El Centro, California, for the official line opening ceremony.
- The Canadian Railway War Board was reorganized as the Railway Association of Canada.
- Aircraft manufacturer Wright-Martin changed its name to Wright Aeronautical after partner Glenn L. Martin resigned from the company.
- The Kentucky Christian University was established in Grayson, Kentucky as the Christian Normal Institute.
- The first public radio station in North America began broadcasting in Montreal.
- King George of the United Kingdom, on advice from Canadian Prime Minister Robert Borden, established the Memorial Cross which was presented to widows and mothers of Canadians who were killed while serving in World War I. It is now awarded to spouses and families of members of the Canadian Armed Forces who died during peacekeeping or other international operations.
- The Portuguese language newspaper Diário de Noite began publication in Panjim, India, and served the city until it ceased operations in 1967.
- The El Dorado Times daily newspaper began publication in El Dorado, Kansas.
- The football club Vallentuna was established in Vallentuna, Sweden.

== December 2, 1919 (Tuesday) ==
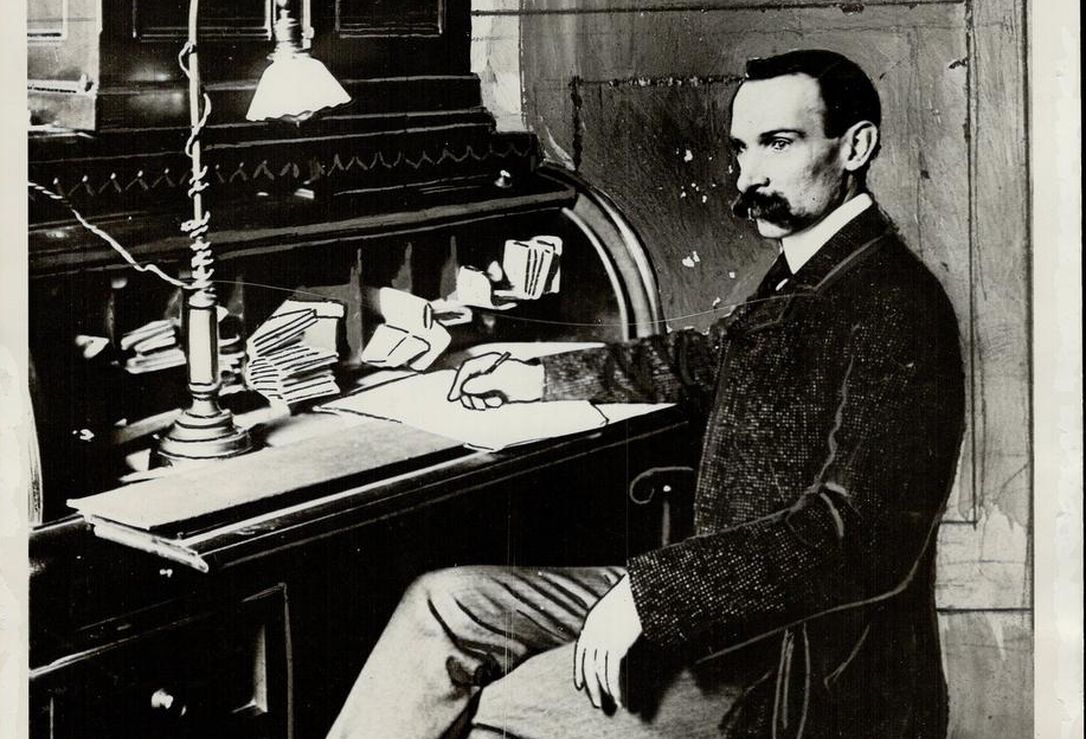
Theater magnate Ambrose Small disppears under mysterious circumstances.

- Canadian theater magnate Ambrose Small disappeared following a meeting with his lawyer F. W. M. Flock in Small's office at the Grand Opera House in Toronto. Flock was discussing Small's sale of all of his theater holdings for CA$1.7 million the previous day. Flick was the last person to see Small when he left the office at 5:30 p.m. Small had been known to disappear for weeks on end but by January Flick and Small's wife grew concerned about his long absence and reported him missing to police. There was no indication of kidnapping or robbery, or evidence of Small taking any money with him. Despite a $50,000 reward made out for information on Small's whereabouts, the reward went unclaimed. Despite numerous leads and theories, Small's disappearance was never solved. He was declared dead in 1924.
- The National Library of Lithuania was established in Kaunas.
- Born: Norma Miller, American dancer, leading promoter of the Lindy Hop, member of the Whitey's Lindy Hoppers; in New York City, United States (d. 2019)
- Died:
  - Henry Clay Frick, 69, American industrialist, chairman of the Carnegie Steel Company, one of the architects of the formation of U.S. Steel (b. 1849)
  - Evelyn Wood, 81, British army officer, noted commander in the Third Anglo-Ashanti War, Anglo-Zulu War, and First Boer War, recipient of the Victoria Cross for action during the Indian Rebellion of 1857 (b. 1838)

== December 3, 1919 (Wednesday) ==
- The Quebec Bridge opened to rail traffic crossing the St. Lawrence River after almost two decades of construction that cost over $23 million and 88 lives. It is 987 meters (3,238 ft) long, incorporating the longest cantilever bridge span in the world at 549 meters (1,801 ft).
- Died: Pierre-Auguste Renoir, 78, French artist, leading developer of Impressionism, best known works included Bal du moulin de la Galette and Luncheon of the Boating Party (b. 1841)

== December 4, 1919 (Thursday) ==
- Australian Royal Air Force officers Captain Cedric Howell and Lieutenant George Henry Fraser left London in a Martinsyde aircraft as part of the competition to complete the England to Australia flight. However, poor weather forced them to land their aircraft in Dijon, France. They managed to get to Italy a few days later before attempting to reach Africa by way of Crete.
- The French Opera House in New Orleans was destroyed by fire.
- The Handley Page Type W aircraft was test flown after making its debut at the Paris Air Show.
- Born:
  - Inder Kumar Gujral, Indian state leader, 12th Prime Minister of India; in Jhelum, British India (present-day Pakistan) (d. 2012)
  - Lawrence Stone, English historian, leading expert on the English Civil War; in Epsom, England (d. 1999)

== December 5, 1919 (Friday) ==
- The White counter-revolutionary Regional Government of Northwest Russia was dissolved in Estonia following their defeat by the Red Army.
- Avianca was founded as the Sociedad Colombo-Alemana de Transporte Aéreo in Barranquilla, Colombia. From 2007 it will be the oldest operating airline in the Americas.
- The Uetsu Main Line was extended in the Yamagata Prefecture, Japan, with stations Mototate and Yuza serving the line. As well, the Echigo rail line was extended in the Niigata Prefecture with stations Kirihara serving the line.
- Born: Alun Gwynne Jones, British politician, cabinet minister for the Harold Wilson administration; in Monmouthshire, Wales (d. 2020)

== December 6, 1919 (Saturday) ==
- António José de Almeida was elected the sixth President of Portugal, defeating rival Manuel Teixeira Gomes with 73% of the vote in the presidential election.
- The Sich Riflemen who fought on behalf of the Ukrainian People's Republic were formally dissolved.
- Born:
  - Paul de Man, Belgian literary critic, proponent of deconstruction in literature; as Paul Adolph Michel Deman, in Antwerp, Belgium (d. 1983)
  - Jimmy Bivins, American boxer, winner of close to 90 heavyweight fights without ever given a chance to compete for the world title; as James Bivins, in Dry Branch, Georgia, United States (d. 2012)

== December 7, 1919 (Sunday) ==
- Julio Acosta García was elected President of Costa Rica with 89% of the vote, while his Constitutional Party took the parliament with nearly three-quarters of the vote in the general election.
- The Independence Museum of Azerbaijan was established in Baku.
- Born:
  - Charles McGee, American air force officer, member of the 332nd Fighter Group or Tuskegee Airmen during World War II, recipient of 25 Air Medals, three Distinguished Flying Crosses, and two Legion of Merit; in Cleveland, United States (d. 2022)
  - Wilfred Arthur, Australian air force officer, commander of the No. 75 Squadron and No. 81 Wing during World War II, recipient of the Distinguished Service Order and Distinguished Flying Cross; in Sydney, Australia (d. 2000)

== December 8, 1919 (Monday) ==
- The third attempt to fly from England to Australia for a £A10,000 prize by the Australian government ended in failure when Australian explorer Captain Hubert Wilkins and his crew crashed landed their Blackburn Kangaroo aircraft in front of a mental hospital at Suda Bay, Crete.
- Incumbent Joseph Clarke was reelected mayor during municipal elections in Edmonton.
- Weslaco, Texas was established when surveyed properties were put up for sale from $50 to $400 per lot. Many buyers were required to camp on the lot for a full day during the sale. Three cars were also given away as a promotion for sales.
- Born:
  - Mieczysław Weinberg, Polish composer, known for works including operas The Passenger; in Warsaw, Second Polish Republic (present-day Poland) (d. 1996)
  - Peter Tali Coleman, Samoan state leader, first native of Samoa to be Governor of American Samoa; in Pago Pago, American Samoa, (d. 1997)

== December 9, 1919 (Tuesday) ==
- The Minority Treaty was signed at Paris, with Romania pledging to grant full citizenship and equal rights to its Jewish residents.
- Born: William Lipscomb, American chemist, recipient for the Nobel Prize in Chemistry for research into nuclear magnetic resonance and the element boron; in Cleveland, United States (d. 2011)

== December 10, 1919 (Wednesday) ==
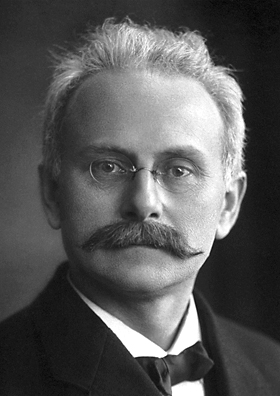
Johannes Stark

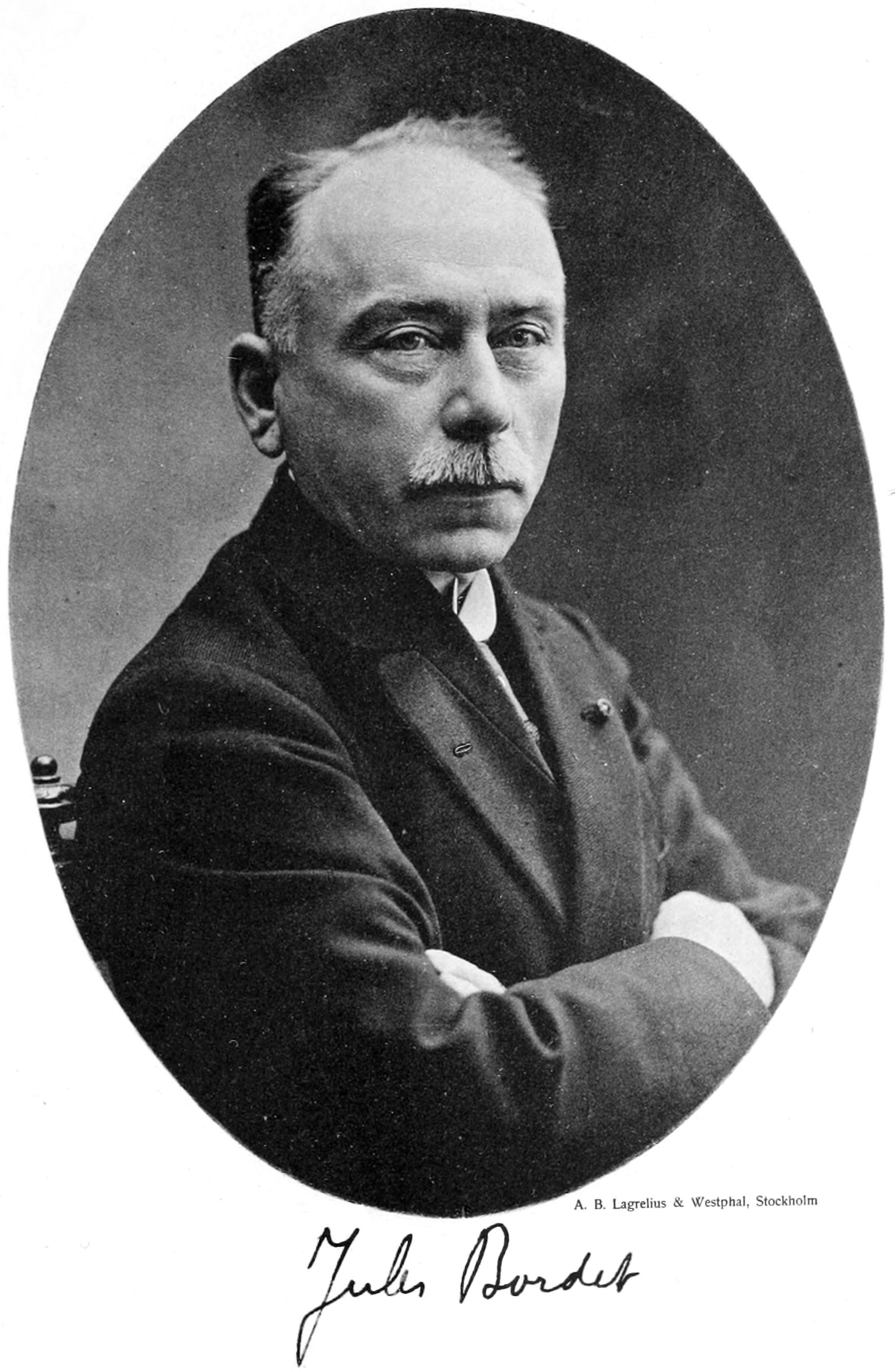
Jules Bordet

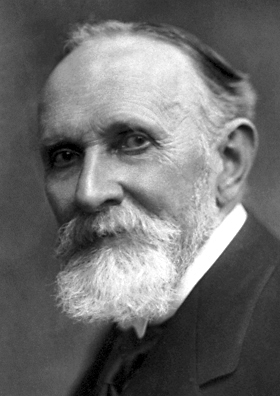
Carl Spitteler

- U.S. President Woodrow Wilson was awarded the Nobel Peace Prize for leading the Paris Peace Conference and brokering the Treaty of Versailles. Other recipients of the Nobel Prize included Johannes Stark for the Nobel Prize in Physics for his contributions into atomic physics, Jules Bordet for the Nobel Prize in Physiology or Medicine for his research into bacteria and immunity, and Carl Spitteler for Nobel Prize in Literature for his contributions to epic poetry.
- Russian Civil War – The first attempt by the 12th Red Army to recapture Kiev from the White Russians failed, forcing the army back across the Dnieper River. The same day, Red Army forces captured Barnaul, Kazakhstan, completely cutting off the Orenburg Independent Army from the main White Army retreat into Siberia forcing them south to Semirechye, Kazakhstan.
- Australian Flying Corps officers and brothers Captain Ross and Lieutenant Keith Macpherson Smith landed their Vickers Vimy bomber in Darwin, Australia to complete the flight from England and Australia. They flew a total 17,911 kilometres (11,123 mi) in 135 hours 55 minutes (131.8 km/h or 81.9 mph). Their crew won the £A10,000 prize offered by the Australian government and received knighthoods for their flight accomplishment.
- Australian Royal Air Force officers Captain Cedric Howell and Lieutenant George Henry Fraser diverted their flight from Crete due to stormy conditions during their flight from England to Australia. They attempted to land at Corfu but crashed into the Mediterranean Sea short of the coast where both men drowned. Howell's body was recovered the following day but Fraser's body was never found.
- The United States House Committee on Oversight and Reform allocated US$1.4 million of US$3 million requested by Second Assistant United States Postmaster General Otto Praeger to set up airmail routes between New York City and other major U.S. cities, with the goal to create a transcontinental route to San Francisco.
- Born:
  - Alexander Courage, American composer, best known for the original theme for the Star Trek television series; in Philadelphia, United States (d. 2008)
  - Jean Lee, Australian criminal, last woman to be executed in Australia; as Marjorie Jean Maude Wright, in Dubbo, New South Wales, Australia (d. 1951)
  - Harrison A. Williams, American politician, United States Representative and United States Senator from New Jersey; in Plainfield, New Jersey, United States (d. 2001)

== December 11, 1919 (Thursday) ==
- The Ceylon National Congress was established to advocate independence from British rule.
- Georgian composer Victor Dolidze premiered his comic opera Keto and Kote in Tbilisi.
- The Boll Weevil Monument was unveiled in Enterprise, Alabama.
- The journalistic honor society Alpha Phi Gamma was established as Phi Alpha Gamma at Ohio Northern University before changing its name in 1923 it avoid confusion with another Phi Alpha Gamma society. It merged with Pi Delta Epsilon to form the Society for Collegiate Journalists in 1975.
- Born: Paavo Aaltonen, Finnish gymnast, three-time gold medalist at the 1948 Summer Olympics; in Kemi, Finland (d. 1962)

== December 12, 1919 (Friday) ==
- The Scotts Bluff National Monument was established in Scotts Bluff County, Nebraska along the North Platte River.
- Imperial College London established its own rowing club in Putney, London, England.
- Born: Dan DeCarlo, American comic book artist, best known for his work with Archie Comics, co-creator of Sabrina the Teenage Witch and Josie and the Pussycats; in New Rochelle, New York, United States (d. 2001)

== December 13, 1919 (Saturday) ==
- Russian Civil War – The Red Army took Karkaralinsk, Kazakhstan, forcing the Orenburg Independent Army to march 600 km to Semirechye. During the march, it was estimated half of the 20,000 involved died from starvation, exposure, or typhus.
- Australia held a referendum on extending legislative powers in relation to the economy and to monopolies. Both referendums were defeated.
- The National Hockey League approved the sale of the Toronto Arenas for $5,000 to Charles Querrie, however former owner Eddie Livingstone did not receive any of the money (it was rumored NHL president Frank Calder pocketed it instead).
- Italian composer Pietro Mascagni premiered his opera Sì at the Teatro Quirino in Rome.
- Born: Hans-Joachim Marseille, German air force officer, commander of Jagdgeschwader 52 and 27 for the Luftwaffe during World War II, recipient of the Knight's Cross of the Iron Cross and Gold Medal of Military Valor; in Berlin, Weimar Republic (present-day Germany) (d. 1942, killed in action)

== December 14, 1919 (Sunday) ==
- The cartoon character Felix the Cat, created by Otto Messmer for the Paramount Studios, was first identified by that name with the release of Messmer's third animated short, The Adventures of Felix. He had been referred to as "Master Tom" in the first two of 's short films, Feline Follies (November 9) and Musical News (November 16).
- The football club Tord was established in Jönköping, Sweden.
- Born: Jigme Palden Dorji, the first Prime Minister of Bhutan (from 1952 to 1964); in Kalimpong, Bengal Province, British India (present-day India) (b. 1964)

== December 15, 1919 (Monday) ==
- Russian Civil War – The 12th Red Army forced the White Russian Army in Kiev from their defensive positions on the Dnieper River as it started to freeze, capturing key bridges the following day and forcing the opposing side to retreat from the city.
- Meat rationing ended in the United Kingdom.
- The Swiss airline Ad Astra Aero was founded in Zürich.
- A fire destroyed the factory owned by the B.N. Morris Canoe Company in Veazie, Maine, effectively putting the canoe manufacturer out of business.
- Born: Max Yasgur, American farmer, best known for donating the 600 acres of his dairy farm in Bethel, New York to host the Woodstock music festival in 1969; in New York City, United States (d. 1973)

== December 16, 1919 (Tuesday) ==
- Russian Civil War – The 12th Red Army reoccupied Kiev that had been taken by the White Army back in August. The White Army began their retreat to the Black Sea.
- Incumbent William Massey of the Reform Party won the general election in New Zealand with more than a third of the vote against rivals Joseph Ward of the New Zealand Liberal Party and Harry Holland of the New Zealand Labour Party. It was also the first time women could run for office in the country, with Ellen Melville, Rosetta Baume, and Aileen Garmson all running but failing to win their seats.
- New Zealand aviator George Bolt made the first airmail flight in New Zealand, completing a round-trip from Auckland to Dargaville on the same day for a total distance of approximately 320 kilometres (200 mi).
- Construction of the Imperial Japanese Navy aircraft carrier Hōshō began, the second ever to be designed and built.
- The German War Graves Commission was established in Kassel, Germany to look after the sites for the dead from World War I.
- Died:
  - Julia Lermontova, 72, Russian chemist, first woman in Russia to receive a doctorate in chemistry (b. 1846)
  - Luigi Illica, 62, Italian composer, known for his collaborations with Giacomo Puccini (b. 1857)

== December 17, 1919 (Wednesday) ==
- French army officer Maurice Pellé became the first Chief of the General Staff for the Czechoslovak Army. A second French army officer Eugène Mittelhauser succeeded in the position and it was until 1926 before Jan Syrový became the first native Czech to serve in the role.
- The Kazakh language newspaper Sovereign Kazakhstan began publication in Kazakhstan.
- Born: Es'kia Mphahlele, South African writer, author of Down Second Avenue and The African Image; as Ezekiel Mphahlele, in Marabastad, Pretoria, Union of South Africa (present-day South Africa) (d. 2008)

== December 18, 1919 (Thursday) ==
- Methodist pastor Will W. Alexander established the Commission on Interracial Cooperation in Atlanta to address racial relationships and conflict in the United States following the racial violence from the Red Summer.
- British aviator John Alcock died from injuries he received after he crashed the Vickers Viking aircraft he was flying in heavy fog during a test flight at Cottévrard, France.
- Cole Porter married Linda Lee Thomas in a civil ceremony at Paris city hall. Despite Porter being gay, the two had a loving marriage that lasted until Lee's death in 1954.

== December 19, 1919 (Friday) ==
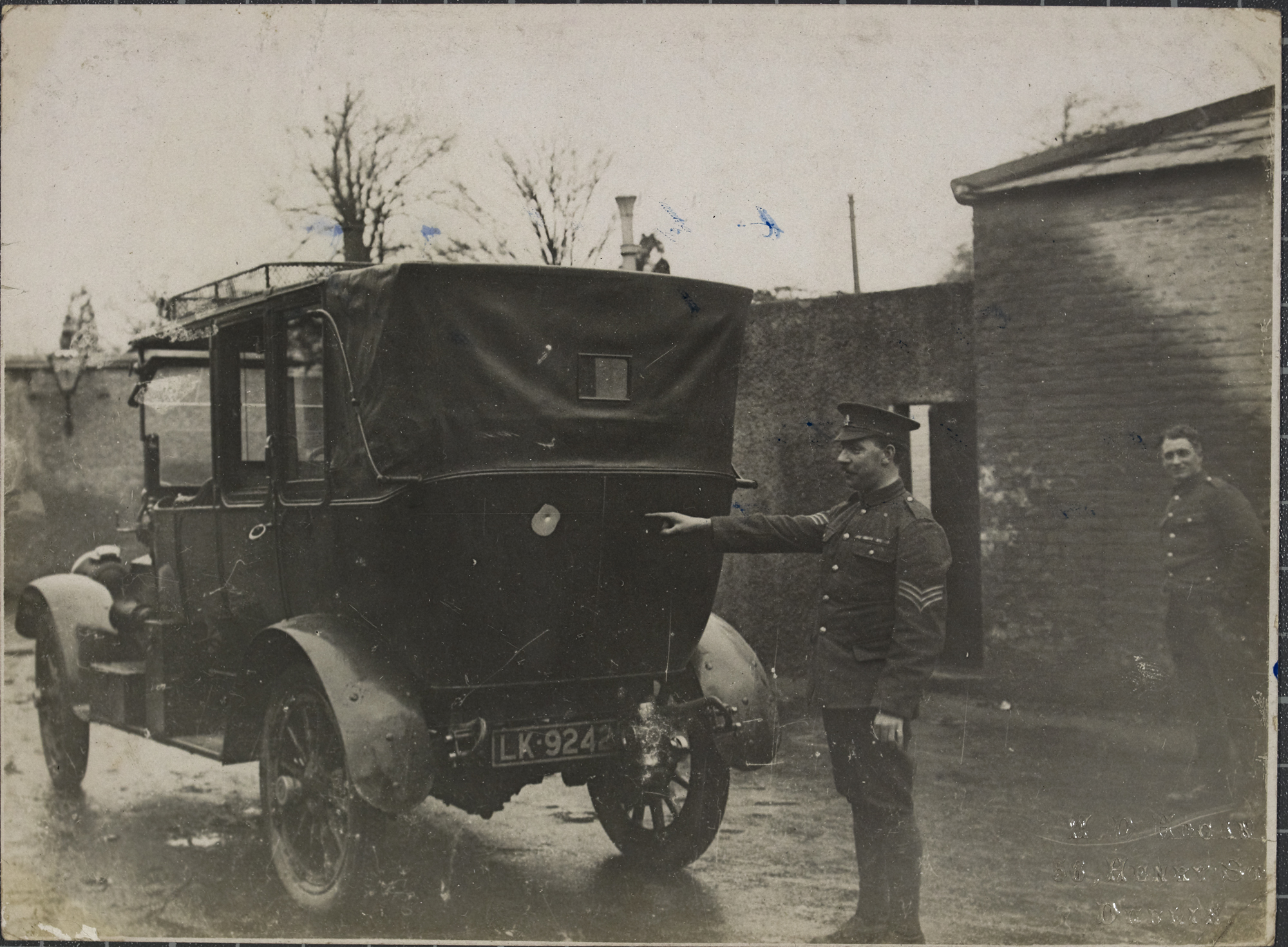
A police constable points out the bullet hole that was made when Lord Lieutenant of Ireland John French's convoy was attacked.

- Incumbent Billy Hughes of the Nationalist Party defeated Frank Tudor of the Australian Labor Party in the Australian federal election despite it being a close race and his party dropping from 53 to 37 parliament seats.
- A train collision in Onawa, Maine killed 23 people.
- A British convoy escorting Lord Lieutenant of Ireland John French was ambushed by Irish Republican Army near Frenchpark, County Roscommon, Ireland. The first vehicle in the convoy carrying French broke through the blockade before the Irish volunteers could react, allowing the armed escort to return fire. Irish officer Martin Savage was killed in the firefight while compatriot Dan Breen was wounded.
- The Yucca House National Monument was established in Montezuma County, Colorado.
- The finance and insurance company American International Group (AIG) was established by Cornelius Vander Starr as American Asiatic Underwriters in Shanghai. It would expand over the next five years throughout Southeast Asia before opening a branch in the United States in 1926.
- The American Meteorological Society was established in Boston.
- The fraternity Alpha Zeta Omega was established at the Philadelphia College of Pharmacy and Science.
- The honor society Gamma Sigma Epsilon was established at Davidson College. It now has 16,000 members in about 80 chapters across the United States.
- The fictional characters Harold Hamgravy and Olive Oyl made their first appearance in the Thimble Theatre comic strip by E. C. Segar. The strip evolved into Popeye when Segar debuted the super-powered sailor in 1929.

== December 20, 1919 (Saturday) ==
- The Royal Australian Navy released five sailors from imprisonment who were convicted of mutiny while serving on the battlecruiser HMAS Australia in June following months of public and government pressure to commute their sentences.
- The Polish Football Association was established in Warsaw.
- Finnish filmmaker Erkki Karu established his production company Suomi-Filmi, leading to the start of the Golden Age of Finnish cinema.
- The Shire of Barron in Queensland, Australia was dissolved and split between the Shires of Cairns and Woothakata.
- The borough of Castle Shannon, Pennsylvania was established.
- Died: Philip Fysh, 84, Australian politician, 12th Premier of Tasmania (b. 1835)

== December 21, 1919 (Sunday) ==
- The United States deported 249 people deemed a security threat for their sympathetic communist or anarchist view to Russia on the USAT Buford, including Emma Goldman and Alexander Berkman.

== December 22, 1919 (Monday) ==
- A bill to reform governance in Ireland was introduced into the British House of Commons, with a proposal from the cabinet Irish committee to form two separate Irish parliaments in Dublin and Belfast respectively.
- The Toronto Arenas hockey club was renamed the Toronto St. Patricks, the precursor to the Toronto Maple Leafs.
- The honor society Theta Alpha Phi was established at Oklahoma A&M College.
- Died: Sarah Morgan Bryan Piatt, 83, American poet, known for her poetry collections including A Woman's Poems (b. 1836)

== December 23, 1919 (Tuesday) ==
- Royal assent was given by King George to the following legislation passed by the Parliament of the United Kingdom:
  - Government of India Act, which allowed British India to move closer to responsible government and eventual independence.
  - Aliens Restriction Act, which extended 1914 guidelines on dealing with enemy aliens following the end of World War I.
  - Church of England Assembly Act, which allowed the Church of England to submit legislation in the form of measures to Parliament.
  - Sex Disqualification Act which removed legal barriers for women entering secular public professions.
- The Central Armed Forces Museum opened in Moscow to commemorate the accomplishments of the Red Army.
- Born:
  - Kenneth M. Taylor, American air force officer, member of the 47th Fighter Squadron during the attack on Pearl Harbor, one of the two pilots (the other being George Welch) to get their planes in the air to fight off Japanese aircraft, recipient of the Distinguished Service Cross, Distinguished Service Medal, Air Medal and Legion of Merit; in Enid, Oklahoma, United States (d. 2006)
  - Peggy Fortnum, English artist, best known for her illustrations for the children's book series Paddington Bear; as Margaret Emily Noel Fortnum, in Harrow, London, England (d. 2016)

== December 24, 1919 (Wednesday) ==
- Alice H. Parker formally filed a patent for the modern central heating gas furnace, the first African American woman to do so.
- The Osaka North Harbour Company was established in Osaka to manage the lands and ports around the city's harbor, eventually evolving into the Sumitomo Corporation.

== December 25, 1919 (Thursday) ==
- The People's Freedom Union organized a march up Fifth Avenue in New York City to support persons imprisoned through the Espionage Act, followed by groups canvassing congregations attending Christmas church services to raise awareness. However, the New York City Police Department broke the up the march before this could occur.
- Cliftonhill opened in Coatbridge, Scotland with a home game between the Albion Rovers and St Mirren. The Rovers lost the opening match with a 2–0 score.
- Born: Naushad, Indian composer, best known for his film scores in Hindi films such as Rattan and Baiju the Insane, recipient of the Padma Bhushan; as Naushad Ali, in Lucknow, British India (present-day India) (d. 2006)

== December 26, 1919 (Friday) ==
- Babe Ruth was traded by the Boston Red Sox to the New York Yankees for $125,000, the largest sum ever paid for a player up to this point in time. However, the deal would not be publicly announced until January 6, 1920.

== December 27, 1919 (Saturday) ==
- The Free Workers' Union of Germany was established after the Free Association of German Trade Unions was reorganized during a three-day conference in Berlin involving 109 delegates representing 111,675 workers. Most of the communist members left to form the General Workers' Union of Germany the following February.
- The Boeing aircraft was used to run airmail service between Seattle and Vancouver.
- French composer Albert Wolff premiered his opera L'oiseau bleu, based on the play The Blue Bird by Maurice Maeterlinck, at the Metropolitan Opera in New York City with the playwright in attendance.
- The village of Coaldale, Alberta was established.
- Born: Charles Sweeney, American air force officer, commander of the bomber Bockscar which carried the atom bomb Fat Man that was dropped on Nagasaki, recipient of the Silver Star and Air Medal; in Lowell, Massachusetts, United States (d. 2004)

== December 28, 1919 (Sunday) ==
- The Shimotsuke Tramway was extended in the Tochigi Prefecture, Japan, with stations Fujiwara serving the line.

== December 29, 1919 (Monday) ==
- The American Meteorological Society, the first organization of weather forecasters and climate scientists, was organized by Charles F. Brooks at a meeting of the American Association for the Advancement of Science in St. Louis. It would be incorporated three weeks later on January 21, 1920.
- Born: Thomas W. Horton, New Zealand air force officer, commander of the No. 105 Squadron during World War II, recipient of the Distinguished Service Order and Distinguished Flying Cross, in Masterton, New Zealand (d. 2021)
- Died: William Osler, 70, Canadian physician, one of the founding professors at Johns Hopkins Hospital (b. 1849)

== December 30, 1919 (Tuesday) ==
- The Ontario Secondary School Teachers' Federation was established during a meeting of 62 representatives from various Ontario schools at 229 College Street in Toronto. It would have more than 1,000 members the following year from 14 districts.
- The Mineralogical Society of America was established in Chantilly, Virginia.
- Born: David Willcocks, British conductor, director of the Choir of King's College of Cambridge from 1957 to 1974, coauthor of Carols for Choirs; in Newquay, Cornwall, England (d. 2015)

== December 31, 1919 (Wednesday) ==
- Russian Civil War – Survivors of the march from Omsk, Russia in November arrived in Semirechye, Kazakhstan. About 20% of the 20,000 men at the start died during the march and 90% of the survivors were stricken with typhus. The force camped near the town until March before the pursuing Red Army forced them over the border into China.
- The National Bank of Georgia was established by the Georgian government.
- Colombian president Marco Fidel Suárez sanctioned the country's first aviation law which made the entire industry in Colombia subject to government regulations.
- The South African Irish Regiment for the South African Army was disbanded in Johannesburg, but would be reactivated in World War II.
- The Boden-Karlsborg Artillery Regiment of the Swedish Army was disbanded in Boden, Sweden.
- Born:
  - Tommy Byrne, American baseball player, pitcher for the New York Yankees from 1943 to 1957, two time World Series champion; in Baltimore, United States (d. 2007)
  - Recy Taylor, American activist, known for pursuing a case against the white men who sexually assaulted her in Alabama in 1944 that many credit for helping give birth to the civil rights movement; as Recy Corbitt, in Abbeville, Alabama, United States (d. 2017)
- Died: Andrew Miller, 62, American publisher, co-founder of Life magazine (b. 1857)
