= Kirihara =

Kirihara may refer to:

== People ==
- Izumi Kirihara, Japanese manga artist
- Mizuki Kirihara (fl. 2022–present), member of Japanese girl group Candy Tune

== Fictional characters ==
- Akaya Kirihara, in the manga and anime series The Prince of Tennis
- Misaki Kirihara, in the anime series Darker than Black
- Taizō Kirihara, in the anime series Code Geass

== Railway stations in Japan ==
- Kirihara Station (Niigata), station in Nagaoka, Niigata Prefecture, on the Echigo Line
- Kirihara Station (Nagano), station in Nagano, Nagano Prefecture, on the Nagano Line
