= Kirihara Station =

Kirihara Station is the name of two train stations in Japan:

- Kirihara Station (Nagano)
- Kirihara Station (Niigata)
