= List of Gamma Sigma Epsilon chapters =

Gamma Sigma Epsilon is an honor society in the field of chemistry. It was founded at Davidson College on December 19, 1919. In 1931 the Fraternity went co-educational and became an honor society. It has chartered 93 chapters. Active chapters are indicated in bold. Inactive chapters are indicated in italics.

Chapter	Charter date and range	Institution	Location	Status	Ref.
**Alpha Alpha**	December 19, 1919	Davidson College	Davidson, North Carolina	Active	
Alpha Beta	February 14, 1921 – 1951	North Carolina State University	Raleigh, North Carolina	Inactive	
Alpha Gamma	1926–1971	Wake Forest University	Winston-Salem, North Carolina	Inactive	
**Alpha Delta**	1999	Catawba College	Salisbury, North Carolina	Active	
Alpha Epsilon	2001–2006	University of North Carolina, Wilmington	Wilmington, North Carolina	Inactive	
**Alpha Zeta**	2004	University of North Carolina at Pembroke	Pembroke, North Carolina	Active	
**Alpha Eta**	2008	University of North Carolina at Chapel Hill	Chapel Hill, North Carolina	Active	
**Alpha Theta**	2010	Methodist University	Fayetteville, North Carolina	Active	
**Alpha Iota**	2013	Gardner–Webb University	Boiling Springs, North Carolina	Active	
**Alpha Kappa**	2024	Meredith College	Raleigh, North Carolina	Active	
Beta Alpha	December 16, 1921 – 1965	University of Florida	Gainesville, Florida	Inactive	
Beta Beta	1932–2011	Stetson University	DeLand, Florida	Inactive	
Beta Gamma	1939–1952	Florida State University	Tallahassee, Florida	Inactive	
**Beta Delta**	1992	Barry University	Miami Shores, Florida	Active	
**Beta Epsilon**	2001	Florida Southern College	Lakeland, Florida	Active	
**Beta Zeta**	2006	Jacksonville University	Jacksonville, Florida	Active	
Gamma Alpha	1923–1924	Johns Hopkins University	Baltimore, Maryland	Inactive	
**Gamma Beta**	2003	McDaniel College	Westminster, Maryland	Active	
**Gamma Gamma**	2005	Hood College	Frederick, Maryland	Active	
**Gamma Delta**	2007	Mount St. Mary's University	Emmitsburg, Maryland	Active	
**Gamma Epsilon**	2007	Frostburg State University	Frostburg, Maryland	Active	
**Gamma Zeta**	2009	Stevenson University	Baltimore County, Maryland	Active	
**Gamma Eta**	2010	Washington College	Chestertown, Maryland	Active	
**Gamma Theta**	2012	Notre Dame of Maryland University	Baltimore, Maryland	Active	
**Gamma Iota**	2013	Delaware State University	Dover, Delaware	Active	
Delta Alpha	1923–1933	Auburn University	Auburn, Alabama	Inactive	
**Delta Beta**	1924	University of Alabama	Tuscaloosa, Alabama	Active	
Delta Gamma	1999–2000	Talladega College	Talladega, Alabama	Inactive	
Epsilon Alpha	1927–1931	Washington and Lee University	Lexington, Virginia	Inactive	
Epsilon Beta	1948–2010	University of Richmond	Richmond, Virginia	Inactive	
Epsilon Gamma	1981–1994	College of William & Mary	Williamsburg, Virginia	Inactive	
**Epsilon Delta**	2008	Virginia Military Institute	Lexington, Virginia	Active	
**Epsilon Epsilon**	2008	Virginia Wesleyan College	Virginia Beach, Virginia	Active	
Zeta Alpha	1929–1968	Georgetown College	Georgetown, Kentucky	Inactive	
Zeta Beta	1998–2001	University of Kentucky	Lexington, Kentucky	Inactive	
**Zeta Gamma**	2005	University of the Cumberlands	Williamsburg, Kentucky	Active	
**Zeta Delta**	2005	Northern Kentucky University	Highland Heights, Kentucky	Active	
**Zeta Epsilon**	2007	Murray State University	Murray, Kentucky	Active	
Eta Alpha	1930–1931	Battle Creek College	Battle Creek, Michigan	Inactive	
**Eta Beta**	2002	Kettering University	Flint, Michigan	Active	
Theta Alpha	1932–1965	University of Wyoming	Laramie, Wyoming	Inactive	
**Iota Alpha**	1932	University of Tennessee at Chattanooga	Chattanooga, Tennessee	Active	
**Iota Beta**	2011	Rhodes College	Memphis, Tennessee	Active	
Kappa Alpha	1933–1965	St. Lawrence University	Canton, New York	Inactive	
Kappa Beta	1953–1960	Adelphi College	Garden City, New York	Inactive	
Kappa Gamma	1965–1990	Clarkson University	Potsdam, New York	Inactive	
**Kappa Delta**	1979	State University of New York at Potsdam	Potsdam, New York	Active	
**Kappa Epsilon**	1999	Mount Saint Mary College	Newburgh, New York	Active	
**Kappa Eta**	1999	College of Mount Saint Vincent	Riverdale, New York	Active	
**Kappa Zeta**	2003	State University of New York at Geneseo	Geneseo, New York	Active	
**Kappa Theta**	2005	Wagner College	Staten Island, New York	Active	
**Kappa Iota**	2005	United States Military Academy	West Point, New York	Active	
**Kappa Kappa**	2008	Niagara University	Lewiston, New York	Active	
**Kappa Lambda**	1999	Manhattan College	Bronx, New York City, New York	Active	
**Kappa Mu**	2010	St. Joseph's University	Brooklyn, New York	Active	
**Kappa Nu**	2010	Iona University	New Rochelle, New York	Active	
**Kappa Xi**	2013	Colgate University	Hamilton, New York	Active	
Lambda Alpha	1935–2003	Mississippi University for Women	Columbus, Mississippi	Inactive	
Lambda Beta	1937–1957	University of Mississippi	Oxford, Mississippi	Inactive	
Mu Alpha	1938–1960	Brenau College	Gainesville, Georgia	Inactive	
Mu Beta	1940–1986	University of Georgia	Athens, Georgia	Inactive	
**Mu Gamma**	1942	Mercer University	Macon, Georgia	Active	
**Mu Delta**	2012	Georgia Southern University–Armstrong Campus	Savannah, Georgia	Active	
Nu Alpha	1957–1996	Ouachita Baptist University	Arkadelphia, Arkansas	Inactive	
**Nu Beta**	2013	Cameron University	Lawton, Oklahoma	Active	
Xi Alpha	1961–1961	Sul Ross State College	Alpine, Texas	Inactive	
Xi Beta	1965–1985	McMurry College	Abilene, Texas	Inactive	
Xi Gamma	1970–1987	Angelo State University	San Angelo, Texas	Inactive	
**Xi Delta**	1972	Midwestern State University	Wichita Falls, Texas	Active	
Xi Epsilon	1981–2007	Stephen F. Austin State University	Nacogdoches, Texas	Inactive	
**Xi Zeta**	1998	University of Texas Permian Basin	Odessa, Texas	Active	
**Xi Eta**	2009	Our Lady of the Lake University	San Antonio, Texas	Active	
Omicron Alpha	1983–1999	Eastern Illinois University	Charleston, Illinois	Inactive	
**Pi Alpha**	1989	Bethany College	Bethany, West Virginia	Active	
**Pi Beta**	1998	Wheeling Jesuit College	Wheeling, West Virginia	Active	
**Pi Gamma**	2012	Ohio Northern University	Ada, Ohio	Active	
**Rho Alpha**	1996	Washington & Jefferson College	Washington, Pennsylvania	Active	
**Rho Beta**	2001	Villanova University	Villanova, Pennsylvania	Active	
**Rho Gamma**	2001	Gannon University	Erie, Pennsylvania	Active	
**Rho Delta**	2002	Lycoming College	Williamsport, Pennsylvania	Active	
**Rho Epsilon**	2004	Juniata College	Huntingdon, Pennsylvania	Active	
**Rho Zeta**	2004	Dickinson College	Carlisle, Pennsylvania	Active	
**Rho Eta**	2006	Elizabethtown College	Elizabethtown, Pennsylvania	Active	
**Rho Theta**	2009	University of Pittsburgh at Greensburg	Greensburg, Pennsylvania	Active	
**Rho Iota**	2007	Waynesburg University	Waynesburg, Pennsylvania	Active	
**Rho Kappa**	2007	Susquehanna University	Selinsgrove, Pennsylvania	Active	
Rho Lambda	2007–2010	Westminster College	New Wilmington, Pennsylvania	Inactive	
**Rho Mu**	2010	Cabrini University	Radnor Township, Pennsylvania	Active	
**Rho Nu**	2010	Saint Francis University	Loretto, Pennsylvania	Active	
**Rho Xi**	2011	Cedar Crest College	Allentown, Pennsylvania	Active	
**Rho Omicron**	2014	West Chester University	West Chester, Pennsylvania	Active	
**Rho Pi**	2015	Saint Vincent College	Latrobe, Pennsylvania	Active	
**Rho Rho**	2019	Lebanon Valley College	Annville Township, Pennsylvania	Active	
**Sigma Alpha**	1997	Georgian Court University	Lakewood Township, New Jersey	Active	
**Sigma Beta**	2003	The College of New Jersey	Ewing Township, New Jersey	Active	
**Sigma Gamma**	2009	Rider University	Lawrence Township, New Jersey	Active	
**Sigma Delta**	2010	New Jersey Institute of Technology	Newark, New Jersey	Active	
**Sigma Epsilon**	2011	Saint Peter's University	Jersey City, New Jersey	Active	
**Sigma Zeta**	2013	Saint Elizabeth University	Morris County, New Jersey	Active	
**Sigma Eta**	2013	Fairleigh Dickinson University	Madison, New Jersey	Active	
**Tau Alpha**	1999	Worcester State University	Worcester, Massachusetts	Active	
**Tau Beta**	2010	Sacred Heart University	Fairfield, Connecticut	Active	
**Tau Gamma**	2011	Emmanuel College	Boston, Massachusetts	Active	
**Tau Delta**	2014	Salem State University	Salem, Massachusetts	Active	
**Upsilon Alpha**	2002	Northwest Missouri State University	Maryville, Missouri	Active	
**Upsilon Beta**	2005	Central Methodist University	Fayette, Missouri	Active	
**Phi Alpha**	2003	University of Colorado Colorado Springs	Colorado Springs, Colorado	Active	
**Phi Beta**	2011	University of Colorado Denver	Denver, Colorado	Active	
Chi Alpha	2004–2011	Coker University	Hartsville, South Carolina	Inactive	
**Chi Beta**	2013	Coastal Carolina University	Conway, South Carolina	Active	
**Chi Gamma**	2013	Francis Marion University	Florence, South Carolina	Active	
**Chi Delta**	2018	Columbus State University	Columbus, Georgia	Active	
**Psi Alpha**	2007	Chaminade University of Honolulu	Honolulu, Hawaii	Active	
**Psi Beta**	2011	Dominican University of California	San Rafael, California	Active	
**Psi Gamma**	2022	Vanguard University	Costa Mesa, California	Active	
