= Orenburg Independent Army =

Military unit

- Оренбургская отдельная армия
- Active: 1918–1920
- Disbanded: March 1920
- Allegiance: White movement
- Size: 10,000
- Engagements: Russian Civil War; Spring offensive of the White Army; Eastern Front counteroffensive; Starving March

Commanders
- Notable commanders: Alexander Dutov

The Orenburg Independent Army (Russian: Оренбургская отдельная армия) was an anti-Bolshevik Army on the Eastern Front during the Russian Civil War.

== History ==
The Army was formed on 17 October 1918 from Orenburg Cossacks and others troops which rebelled against the Bolsheviks, under the command of Alexander Dutov. The army was subordinated to the Supreme Commander-in-chief appointed by the Provisional All-Russian Government, first Lieutenant General Vasily Boldyrev, and then Admiral Kolchak.

On 28 December the army was renamed the Orenburg Independent Army, consisting of:

- the 1st Orenburg Cossack Corps
- and 2nd Orenburg Cossack Corps,
- the 4th Orenburg Army,
- the consolidated Sterlitamak and Bashkirian (4 Infantry Regiments) Corps
- and the 1st Orenburg Cossack Plast Division.

The Army counted some 10,000 men.

== Operations ==
In 1918, the Army operated with varying success in the Southern Urals and northern regions of the Steppe region (now Kazakhstan), mainly against the 1st Red Army, defending the Orenburg Oblast. However, in late 1918/early 1919 serious setbacks occurred. In January the Army was forced to abandoned Orenburg and Orsk. The defeats can be explained primarily by fatigue, the unwillingness of a large part of the Cossacks to continue the war, the rise of pro-Soviet sentiment, desertion and even the changing to the Red side of entire units. This was largely the result of Bolshevik propaganda amongst the troops and in their rear.

When in the spring of 1919, Kolchak launched the Spring Offensive of the Russian Army (1919), he was supported in the South by the Army of Dutov. In April, the Orenburg Independent Army launched an offensive between the rivers Sakmara and Ural in the direction of Aktobe. She took Ilek, Orsk, and pushed back the Red Orenburg Group. She lay siege to Orenburg, but was unable to take the city and had to withdraw. The situation in the Army deteriorated and on 23 May 1919 she was reformed into a corps and together with the Southern Group of the Western Army recreated as a new Southern Army under command of Petr Belov. After new defeats, the remnants of her forces were included in the 3rd White Army.

The Army then participated in the failed June offensive on Orenburg, and from the end of July 1919 acted independently. In August it covered Bashkiria and the Orenburg region and held the Verkhneuralsky District, trying to keep in connection with the Ural Army. After the loss of Verkhneuralsk, she withdrew to the southeast and in September reached Petropavlovsk through the Turgay steppe. On September 21 a new Orenburg Army was created, again under command of Dutov.

By the end of October 1919, the Orenburg Army consisted of only 4,300 men, 16 machine guns, and 4 light weapons. During the winter 1919–20, she retreated to Semirechye in what is known as the Starving March, as half of the participants perished. There for a while, she acted together with the Army of Boris Annenkov. In March 1920 her remnants crossed the border into the Northwestern region of China.

== Commanders ==
- Alexander Dutov (17 October 1918 − 23 May 1919),
- Petr Belov (23 May 1919 − 21 September),
- Alexander Dutov (21 September 1919 – 16 October 1919).
