= Starving March =

Russian Civil War

The Starving March (Russian: Голодный поход) was the retreat of the Orenburg Independent Army under command of generals Alexander Dutov and Andrei Bakic in the winter of 1919–1920 from the area around Kokchetav over Sergiopol, through Kazakhstan towards Semirechye on the Kazakh-Chinese border.

== History ==
The retreat began on November 22, after the Red Army captured the city of Omsk. As the bulk of the White Army headed East in the Great Siberian Ice March towards Lake Baikal, the Orenburg Army took a slightly more South-Eastern direction through Kazakhstan towards Sergiopol.

On December 1, Red Army troops captured Semipalatinsk, and on December 10, Barnaul, thus cutting of the Army of Dutov from the main force of the White Army under Vladimir Kappel. The only way possible now, was to march south to the Semirechye, which was under control of Ataman Annenkov. On December 13 Karkaralinsk was taken by the Red Army and Dutov's troops departed from Sergiopol towards Semirechye and the Chinese border. This segment of the road (about 600 km) was the hardest, and many of the retreating Cossacks and refugees died of starvation and disease.

The troops retreated in the sparsely populated, barren terrain, and had to spend the night in the open air. They had to eat horses and camels. The local population couldn't sustain thousands of extra people. The mortality from cold, famine and typhoid grew. The seriously ill were left to die in settlements, for the deceased there was no time to bury them in the frozen ground. Long day marches allowed the bulk of the army to stay ahead of the enemy, but stragglers were often attacked and killed by Kazakhs.

The remains of the Orenburg Army reached Semirechye on December 31, 1919, and were met with hostility by Annenkov's Semirechye Cossacks. It is estimated that half of the 20,000 people that started the march died, and that 90% of the survivors were sick with various stages of typhus. The Orenburg Army camped in Semirechye until March. When the Red Army approached, they crossed the Chinese border between March and May 1920 together with the 4,000 Semirechye Cossacks, to be interned.

== See also ==
- Bibliography of the Russian Revolution and Civil War
- Outline of the Russian Revolution and Civil War
- Index of articles related to the Russian Revolution and Civil War
- The "Russian" Civil Wars, 1916–1926: Ten Years That Shook the World
- Russia in Flames: War, Revolution, Civil War, 1914–1921
- Russia in Revolution: An Empire in Crisis, 1890 to 1928
- Russia: Revolution and Civil War, 1917—1921
- The Russian Revolution: A New History
- Great Siberian Ice March
- Death March of the Ural Army
