= Disappearance of Ambrose Small =

1919 vanishing of the Canadian theater magnate

Ambrose Small
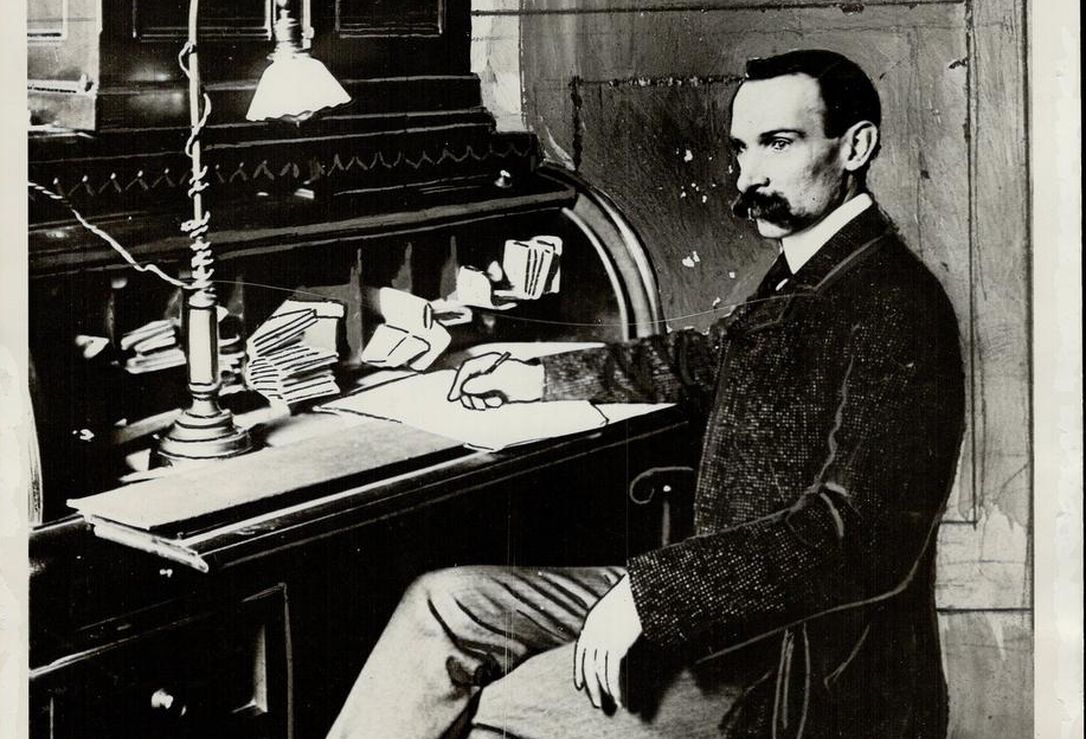
- Born: Peter Ambrose Joseph Small; January 11, 1866; Newmarket, Ontario
- Disappeared: December 2, 1919 (aged 53); Grand Opera House, Toronto, Ontario
- Status: Declared dead in absentia
- Occupation: Theatre magnate
- Spouse: Theresa Kormann (m. 1902)
- Parent(s): Daniel Small and Helen Brazell

Ambrose Joseph Small (January 11, 1866 – disappeared December 2, 1919) was a Canadian theatre magnate who owned several Ontario-based theatres including the Grand Opera House in Toronto, the Grand Opera House in Kingston, the Grand Theatre in London, and the Grand Theatre in Sudbury. The last known sighting of Small occurred the evening of December 2, 1919. He had been known to travel without notice, so his disappearance was not reported until early 1920. His body was never recovered.

Small's disappearance became a national news sensation. Various theories explaining Small's disappearance were publicly promoted, and the famed mystery writer Sir Arthur Conan Doyle was consulted, although he elected not to pursue the case.

== Early life ==
Peter Ambrose Joseph Small was born on January 11, 1866, in Newmarket, Ontario, to Daniel Francis Small, an innkeeper, and Helen (Ellen) Brazell, each twenty years old. He was baptized Roman Catholic on January 21, 1866. The Smalls were likely linked to the Brazill House (Hotel), which was established by Mary Brazell in Bond Head, Ontario.

The 1871 Canadian census places his address in Albion, Cardwell, Ontario, age 6. The 1881 Canadian census places his address in St. Andrew's Ward, Toronto, at age 15. The 1891 Canadian census places his address in St. Thomas's Ward, Toronto, age 25.

Small married Theresa Kormann on November 6, 1902, in Toronto.

== Disappearance ==
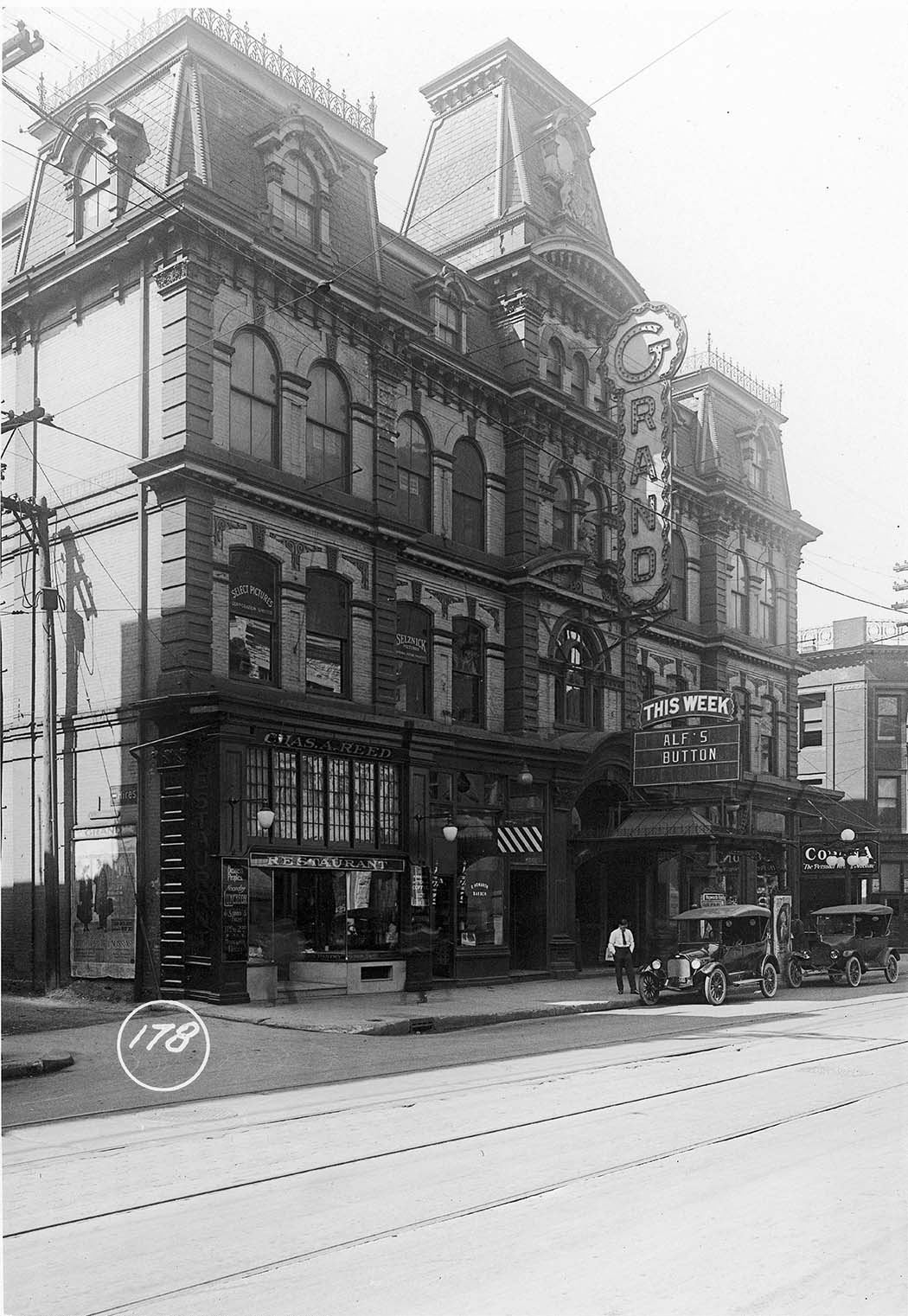
The Grand Opera House in Toronto, where Small was last seen

On December 1, 1919, Ambrose Small sold all his theatre holdings at a profit of CA$1.7 million. The following day he met with lawyer F. W. M. Flock in Small's office at the Grand Opera House. Flock left at 5:30 p.m. and was the last person to see Small.

That night, Small disappeared from his office. No one who testified for the police claimed to have seen him leave his office or in the Adelaide and Yonge Street area outside the building. A newsstand operator, Ralph Savein, claimed to have seen Small and had an altercation with him regarding the late shipment of that day's newspapers. At the time, however, this claim was discounted by the police, who considered it to be an attempt by Savein to gain fame from the case.

Small had no motive to disappear: the millionaire did not take money with him, nor was there any ransom note, let alone evidence of kidnapping. At 53, Small owned theatres in seven Ontario cities and was the controller of 62 other buildings, a self-made millionaire at the height of his career. Because Ambrose Small was known to disappear occasionally to womanize and carouse, his absence was not reported nor was it noted for several weeks. In January 1920, Small's attorney, F. W. M. Flock, along with Theresa Small, now alarmed by Small's lengthy absence, notified the local police. Theresa Small offered a $50,000 reward for information about her husband's disappearance and whereabouts if he was found alive, and $15,000 if dead. The reward went unclaimed.

== The investigation ==
=== Original leads ===
The police launched an extensive investigation. Small was officially declared dead in 1923. The case remained unsolved until being closed in 1960.

The week of his disappearance, Small's Opera House was playing Revelations of a Wife, a play that attracted full houses. Police analyzed the plot and its themes but found no leads. Small had not used this play to provide cryptic hints.

His wife Theresa suggested that Small had fallen into the hands of a "designing woman" but police found no candidates.

Along with his office, "Amby", as he was known locally, had a "private, secret room" with its own entrance. The room is said to have had a dual purpose: first and foremost, it was for the settling of gambling debts, and secondly, it was for Ambrose Small's many private liaisons with actresses and chorus girls, employees at his Ontario theatres. The room was scoured for leads but with no success.

Ambrose Small was not the only notable disappearance in December 1919. His former secretary, John (Jack) Doughty, had not been seen since December 2, 1919. The last sighting of Doughty in Canada was at a bank where he was observed cashing in CA$100,000 in bonds. He was eventually located in the United States and extradited back to Canada to stand trial. He was convicted only of the theft of the bonds. No evidence was ever found he was responsible or had any knowledge of the disappearance of his boss, Ambrose Small.

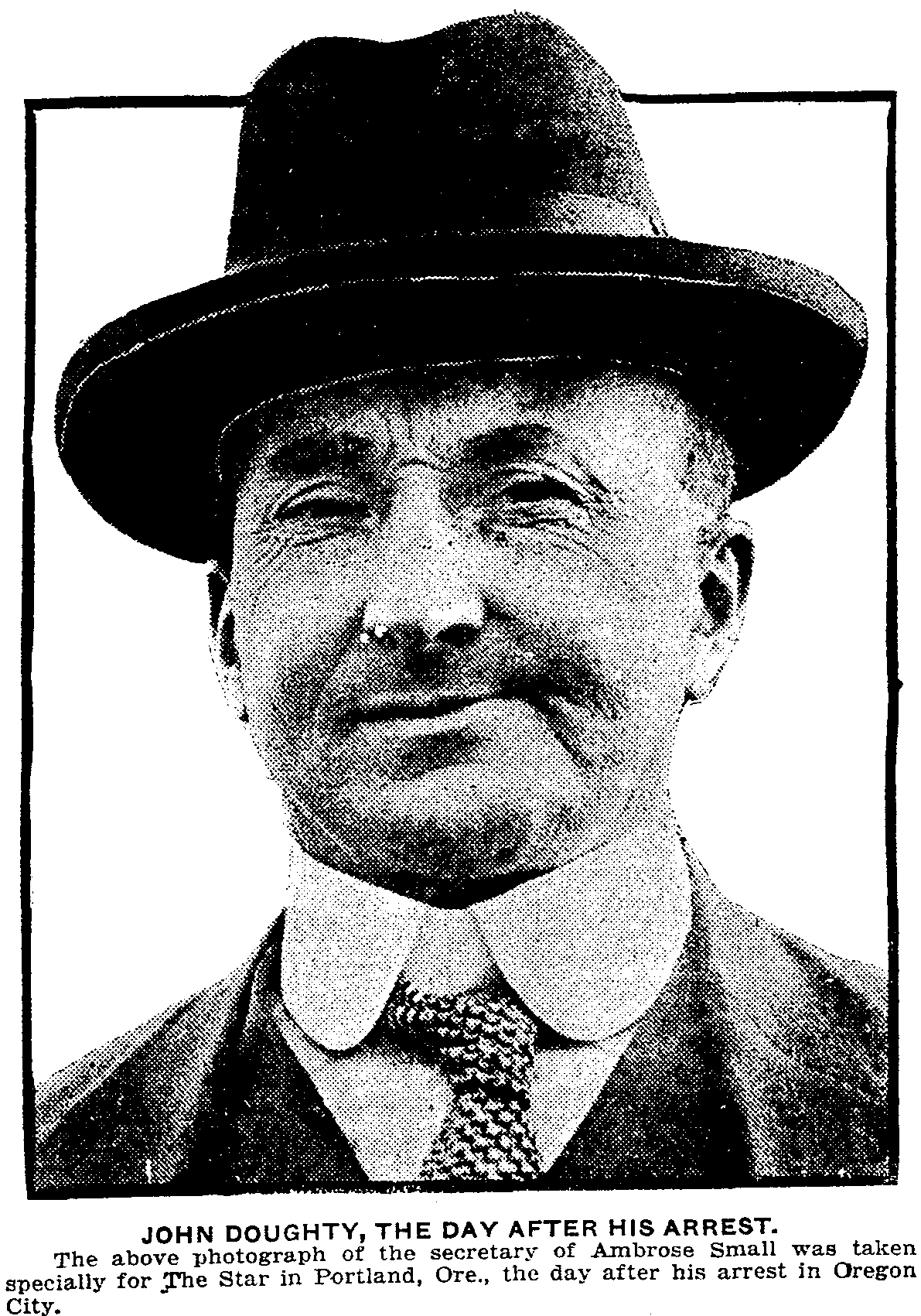
Photo of Jack Doughty, Ambrose's assistant

=== The 1921 Des Moines mystery man ===
Reported in several newspapers in 1921, a man was purportedly discovered in Iowa bearing resemblance to the missing man. Private detective John J. Brothy stated that the man, who he claimed was Small, was a "half-crazed cripple." He stated that he had been dropped off in Des Moines, Iowa, by an unidentified motorist who claimed he'd accidentally struck Small with his car, badly wounding him and that he hoped he'd receive the best medical care available.

Brothy claimed that the man had a gunshot wound in his neck, a serious concussion and both his legs had been severed from the knee down. He further stated that the man didn't speak for three weeks before finally breaking his silence, stating, "I am John Doughty. I came here from Omaha. That is all I remember." At this time however John "Jack" Doughty was incarcerated in Canada and had been for several months, meaning the crippled man could not have been him.

Brothy further claimed that he showed a photo of Ambrose Small to the man to which he responded by pointing at the photo and stating, quote "Yes, that is me." Brothy stated the man's facial characteristics were identical to the missing magnate's, however the mystery man weighed a significant amount more than Small had at his disappearance, having weighed only around 100 pounds.

Further reports state that the man was taken into custody by the P.I.(s), however the Des Moines police were quoted as being unaware of any of these actions and had not been contacted by the investigator(s).

It can be assumed that this lead turned out to be a dead end, as the case continued on long after this event.

=== 1936 Ontario Provincial Police re-investigation ===
In 1936 the case was re-investigated by the Ontario Provincial Police at the behest of the Attorney General. O.P.P. inspector Edward L. Hammond consulted with the original investigators from the Toronto police, obtained typed copies of their report and various other source documents, and re-interviewed some witnesses.

Hammond's conclusion, that Small was murdered in a plot of which his wife was the "prime mover," is in marked contrast to the Ontario government's public position that Mrs. Small (and hence also her large monetary bequest to the Catholic church) was beyond reproach. Hammond also strongly implies that the original chief investigator, Austin Mitchell of the Toronto Police, ignored or repressed evidence which would lead to Mrs. Small as a suspect.

=== The Reuter confession letter ===
Theresa Small died October 14, 1935, bequeathing the majority of her holdings to the Roman Catholic Church, valued at over 500,000 pounds. In June 1936, her remaining possessions were to be auctioned off. Ambrose Small's sister, Florence Small, presented a letter of confession from someone known only as "Reuter," who claimed to have been the murderer.

"Poor Ambrose was killed on December 2, 1919, and I know that part of his body, the trunk, was buried in the Rosedale ravine dump and other parts of the body were burned in the Grand Opera House furnace. You will be surprised, my dear Florence and Gertrude, to learn that I am more responsible for your brother's death. God forgive me. — Reuter."

The sale, however, continued, and the letter was published in several news publications worldwide, including the New York Daily News and the Portsmouth [UK] Evening News.

=== Sir Arthur Conan Doyle ===
Toronto reporters contacted Sir Arthur Conan Doyle about the case when the author was on a New York visit. Doyle politely ignored the case, but it produced the headline "Sherlock Holmes takes Small case under wing".

=== Charles Fort ===
American writer and researcher into anomalous phenomena Charles Fort wrote about the unexplained disappearances of Ambrose Small and Ambrose Bierce, and asked "Was somebody collecting Ambroses?"

== In popular culture ==
Small appears as a major character in the Michael Ondaatje novel In the Skin of a Lion. The events concerning him in the novel after his disappearance are fictitious.

Small appears as a real-life disappearance case in The Convict Lover by Canadian author Merilyn Simonds.

In 2019 a book by Toronto Star feature writer Katie Daubs, marking the 100th anniversary of Small's disappearance, was widely anticipated.

In 2019, the Grand Theatre in London, Ontario commissioned a play about the disappearance from Trina Davies. Grand Ghosts, a theatrical, vaudeville-influenced play, made its debut in October 2022.

== See also ==
- List of people who disappeared
