= Vassily Balabanov =

Russian politician

Vasily Vasilyevich Balabanov
- Born: 30 January 1873; Bakhmut, Russian Empire
- Died: 27 January 1947 (aged 73); Vancouver, Canada
- Occupation: politician

Vasily Vasilyevich Balabanov (Note: Variously transliterated, such as Vassily Vassilievich and Vasile Vasilivich) (Russian: Васи́лий Васи́льевич Балаба́нов; 30 January 1873 – 27 January 1947) was a former governor of Turkestan in Imperial Russia, a governor of Semirechye, an SR and a commissar of the Russian Provisional Government.

== Biography ==
Vasily Balabanov was the third of five children of Vasily Stepanovich Balabanov and Maria Muravskaya.

In 1892 he was married for the first time. In 1894 Balabanov graduated from Moscow University and returned to the family estate in Bakhmut. He was noted for being sympathetic to the peasants and helped modernize methods and improve conditions.

In 1905 he visited Asiatic Russia, impressed with the vastness and available land for the poor Russian peasants. He went to Moscow with his idea and came back with the backing of the government.

Balabanov received the title of 'Minister of Resettlement of Turkestan' and helped the new arrivals settle in the area.

His first wife died after 4 children (Galina, Sergey, Alexey and Klara) and Balabanov married Anastasia Kvasnicki from Odessa, the daughter of a Jewish merchant with whom he had three children, Vladimir, Basil and Taras.

In 1913 Balabanov was appointed governor-general of the Turkestan Province. He spent time with dignitaries, and had one of the few automobiles in this remote area. Although he didn't live in a palace, the official house was large and it had many staff in attendance.

With the start of World War I in 1914 the Tsar needed soldiers from the peasants and Balabanov had to balance this with keeping enough farmers in the fields to produce enough food for everyone. As a result few staff were available to take care of his offices and home. In 1915 his 18 year old nanny was pregnant and his wife left. His nanny Vera Afanaseva continued to care for his children who were not allowed to leave.

=== Russian Civil War ===
By 1919 the Russian Revolution had reached Turkestan. For many months there was fighting between the reds and whites, with one side taking a town only to be taken back a few days later. Balabanov spent a great deal of time working with Alexander Dutov and General Grigory Semyonov in diplomacy. One time Dutov sent Balabanov to convince Semyonov to join him in an attack. Semyonov claimed Balabanov was no longer the Governor because the government no longer gave support. Semyonov though wrote out appointments to Balabanov's three sons as Lieutenants.

Balabanov was imprisoned several times by the reds narrowly escaping with his life, once being freed by a newly made red who remembered his helpfulness, once survived because the man next to him was the one who got shot. Another time the reds broke into the government house, took all his valuables and destroyed anything else.

He refused the French offer of sanctuary but with the help of Dutov he escaped through the mountainous passes with his younger children, third wife, and trusted officers to China in 1920. One of the passes he had to pass was through a red blockade by walking quietly at night.

He settled in the border area for about 6 months helping the anti-Bolsheviks until an assassination attempt (a 10,000 ruble reward was posted for him) forced him to flee with his family overland to Hankou, passing through the Gobi Desert. However, Alexander Dutov was assassinated when he escaped to China.

At the time China did not recognize the Russian Soviet Federative Socialist Republic, and Balabanov being invited to China by the Governor of the nearest Province as an equal was supplied with a small stipend while in China to pay for expenses.

When he and his family had arrived in Hankou, after 6 months of hard travel, and he went to the best hotel in the city, he startled the hotel management by his appearance, with dirty furs and ragged clothing, they were almost kicked out of the hotel until Balabanov gave proof of his identity.

Balabanov and his family stayed in Hankou for 6 years before emigrating to Vancouver on the RMS Empress of Russia with the help of Western Missionaries in Shanghai.

He settled with his family (Clara, Basil, Taras, Galina and Olga) and lived on a farm in Richmond, Vancouver, and in Grand Forks, British Columbia.

In spite of his background Vasile spent the remainder of his life working as a labourer because he never learned to speak English. He died in 1947.
