= Alexander Dutov =

Russian Cossack ataman and lieutenant general (1879–1921)

Ataman Alexander Dutov
- Александр Ильич Дутов
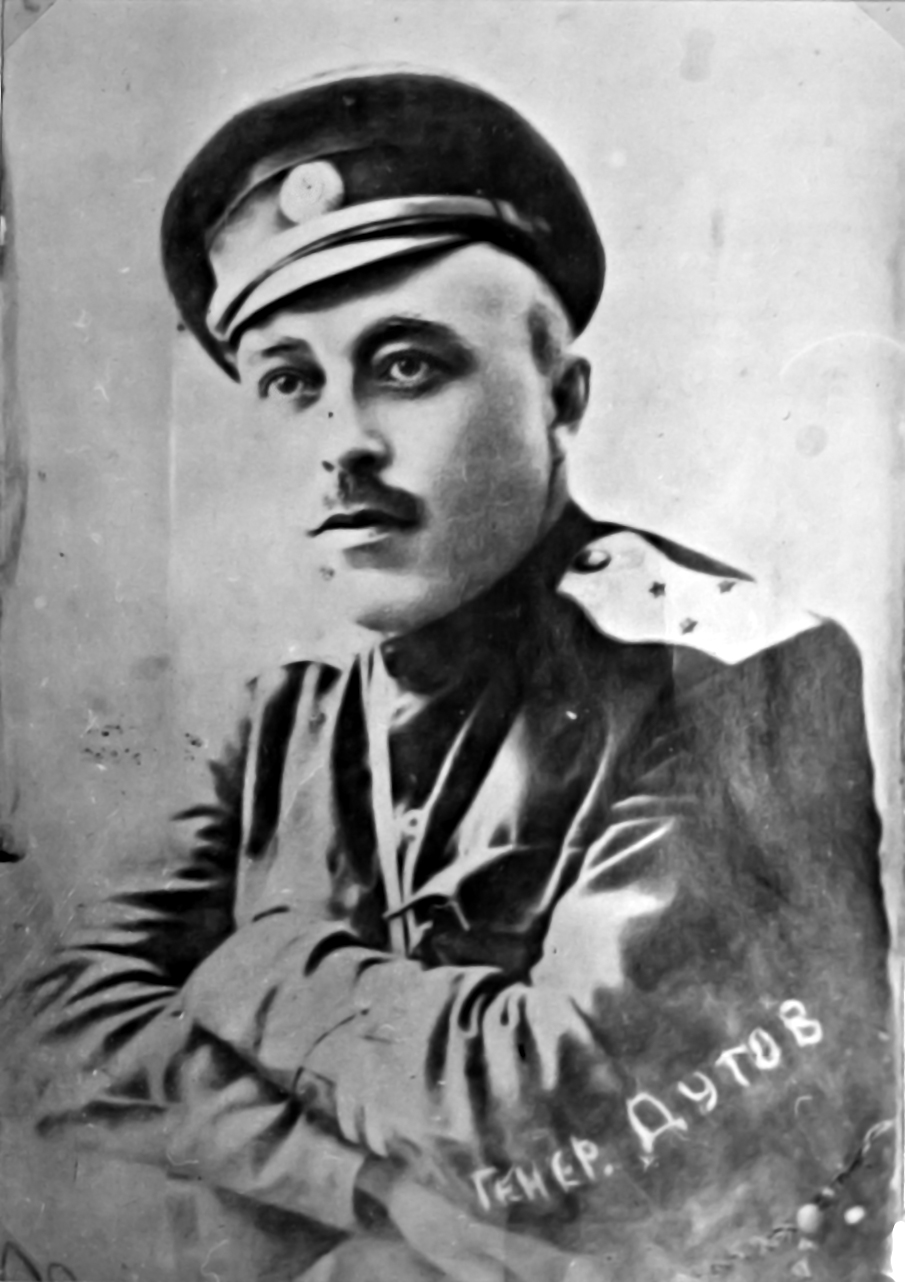
- Born: 17 August 1879; Kazalinsk, Syr-Darya Oblast, Russian Empire (now Kazaly, Kazakhstan)
- Died: 7 February 1921 (aged 41); Shuiding, Xinjiang, China
- Cause of death: Assassination by gunshot
- Military career
- Allegiance: Russian Empire; White movement
- Branch: Imperial Russian Army
- Service years: 1908–1921
- Rank: Lieutenant General
- Commands: Orenburg Cossacks; Orenburg Independent Army
- Conflicts: World War I; Russian Civil War; Starving March

Alexander Ilyich Dutov (Russian: Алекса́ндр Ильи́ч Ду́тов; 17 August [O.S. 5 August] 1879 – 7 February 1921) was a Russian Cossack ataman and lieutenant general who led the Orenburg Cossacks in a revolt against the Bolsheviks.

== Biography ==
Dutov was born in Kazalinsk in Syr-Darya Oblast (now Kazaly in Kazakhstan). He graduated from Nicholas Cavalry College and Nicholas Engineering College, now Military engineering-technical university (Russian Военный инженерно-технический университет), and General Staff Academy (1908). He was assistant commander of the Cossack regiment during World War I. After the February Revolution, Dutov was appointed head of the All-Russian Cossack Army Union, then chairman of the counterrevolutionary All-Russian Cossack Congress (June 1917), and then, in September 1917, Chief of the Army Administration and ataman of the Orenburg Cossack Army.

In November 1917, Dutov raised a revolt against the Red Army authorities in Orenburg. In June 1918, Dutov, with the help of the Czech Legion, organized a struggle for complete termination of the Soviet authority in the Urals. He was in charge of the Orenburg Independent Army in Aleksandr Kolchak's army.

In 1919, he tried to convince General Grigory Semyonov to join him as a stronger force to fight the Red Army. Semyonov refused despite a significant diplomatic effort from Governor Vasile Balabanov, claiming he was governor only since the provisional government in Saint Petersburg collapsed in the revolution.

On 9 May 1918, after Dutov captured Alexandrov Gay village, nearly 2,000 men of the Red Army were buried alive. More than 700 people from the village were executed. After capturing Troitsk, Orenburg, and other cities, a regime of terror was installed over 6,000 people, of whom 500 were killed just during interrogations. In Chelyabinsk, Dutov's men executed or deported to Siberian prisons over 9,000 people. In Troitsk, in the first weeks after the capture of the city, Dutov's men shot about 700 people. In Ileka they killed over 400. These mass executions were typical of Dutov's Cossack troops. Dutov's executive order of 4 August 1918, imposed the death penalty for evasion of military service and for even passive resistance to authorities on its territory. In one district of the Ural region in January 1918, Dutov's men killed over 1,000 people. On 3 April 1919, the Cossack warlord ordered his troops to shoot and take hostages for the slightest display of opposition. In the village of Sugar, Dutov's men burned down a hospital with hundreds of Red Army patients.

After his army's defeat by Red Army, Dutov led his Orenburg Army in the Starving March during the winter of 1919–1920 to Semirechye, and from there in March–May 1920 to China. At that time, General Dutov also helped a number of Russian leaders, including Vasile Balabanov, the administrator of Semirechye, to escape to China.

Dutov was assassinated in Suiding, China, by the Bolshevik agent Мahmud Khadzhamirov (Махмуд Хаджамиров) in February 1921.

== See also ==
- Russian Civil War
- White movement
