= Grand Opera House (Toronto) =

Theatre in Toronto, Canada

Coordinates: 43.6499°N 79.3796°W

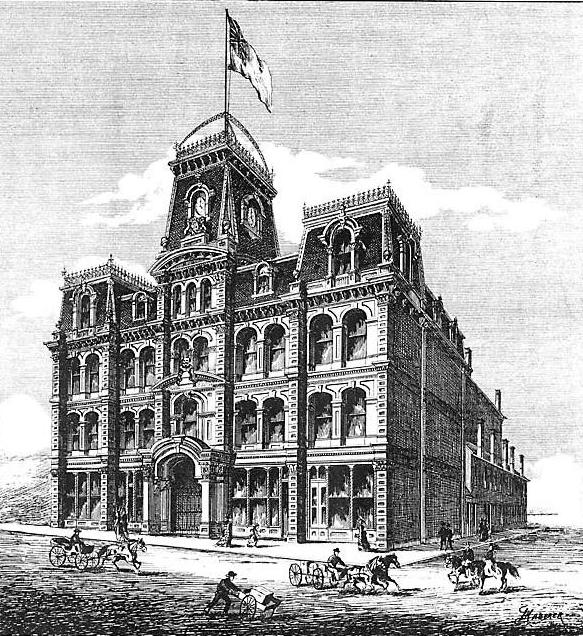
- The Grand Opera House, Toronto circa 1874
- Interactive map of Grand Opera House
- Location: 11 Adelaide Street West, Toronto, Ontario, Canada
- Capacity: 1,700

Construction
- Architect: Thomas R. Jackson

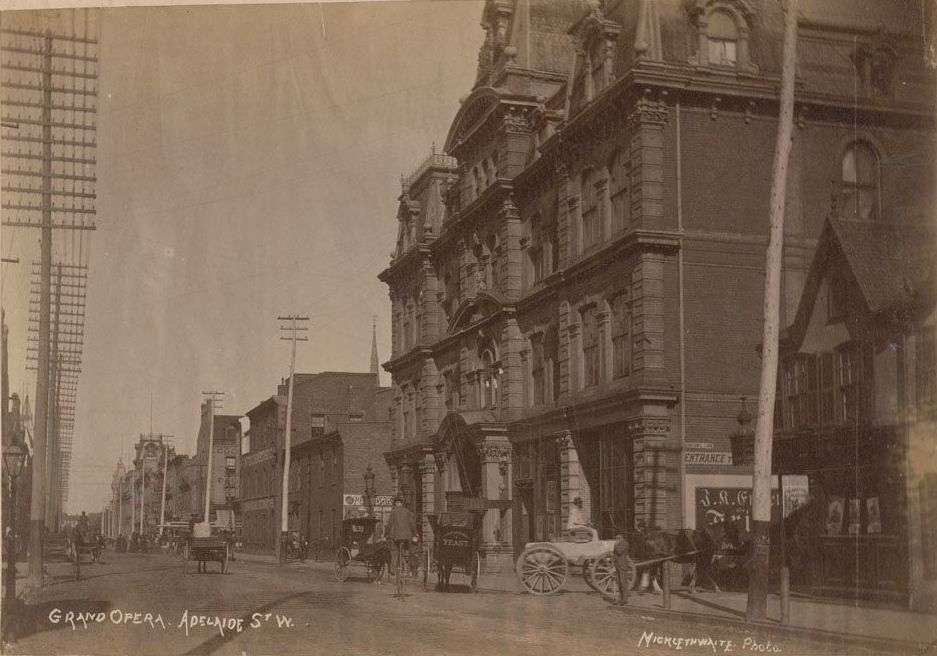
The Grand Opera House, circa 1885, by F.W. Micklethwaite

The Grand Opera House was an opera house, live theatre, and concert hall located in Toronto, Ontario, Canada. The theatre opened in 1874, and survived several fires before falling into decline in the 1920s due to competition and scandal, eventually being demolished in 1927.

== History ==
In the late 1860s and early 1879s, the Royal Lyceum was a success providing live theatre and opera, however it was limited to 700 seats, often limiting its profitability. A plan was made to build a new, larger, more modern live theatre. The Grand Opera House was that venue. The Grand Opera House opened in 1874 at an opportunistic time - the Royal Lyceum was destroyed by fire. Another theatre, the Queen's Theatre, with a capacity of 1,000 also opened at that time.

The Grand Opera House opened not on King Street, but instead on Adelaide Street, west of Yonge Street. Designed in the Second Empire style with 1750 seats, the hall was the first in the city to feature gaslights that could all be switched on or off simultaneously with one electric switch, eliminated the need for bells and whistles to signal lighting changes. This technological advantage was short-lived. The new Royal Opera House, as the rebuilt Royal Lyceum was called, opened in September 1874 with a slightly smaller capacity of 1,450 seats, having the same feature. Despite the competition, the Grand Opera House became Toronto's premier concert hall during the late 19th century, especially after both the Queen's Theatre and the Royal Opera House burned down in 1883 and neither were rebuilt.

The Grand Opera House opened in 1874 with a gala featuring the theatre's manager Charlotte Morrison in The School for Scandal in the part of Lady Teazle. It was not immediately successful and was sold at auction after two years of operation.

The Grand Opera House's stage hosted some of the era's best-known performers, including actors Maurice Barrymore, Sarah Bernhardt, Edwin Booth, and Sir Henry Irving, soprano Emma Albani, as well as Italian baritones Giuseppe Del Puente and Antonio Galassi. Visiting lecturers included Oscar Wilde. During its initial years, the Grand Opera House was managed by Charlotte Morrison, a former actress, and the guiding force at that time behind Toronto's opera and theatre scenes. Morrison has been described as the "Ed Mirvish of her time".

The Grand Opera House suffered a number of fires, including a major blaze in 1879 that killed a stage-carpenter, as well as his wife and infant daughter. During the late-1890s, the Grand Opera House had its own press agent, W. A. Hewitt. Although the hall was restored and reopened after each fire, it slowly fell into neglect with the arrival of the vaudeville age in the 1900s, which brought with it newer theatres to Toronto, most notably the Princess Theatre, Shea's Hippodrome, and the Loews and Winter Garden Theatres. The Princess, especially, produced live theatre such as Shaw's Caesar and Cleopatra that might have played at the Grand Opera.

In 1919, the Grand Opera House became embroiled in an infamous and widely reported criminal investigation. On December 2, the Grand Opera House's owner at the time, Ambrose Small, deposited a cheque for a million dollars in a nearby bank, and went missing later that day. Before his disappearance, Small already had a reputation in Edwardian era Toronto as a gambler, and booked less reputable, more titillating shows to his string of theatres, including the Grand Opera House. The newspapers published every known detail of the police investigation into his disappearance, and soon it was revealed that Small had kept a secret sex room at the Grand Opera House, where he entertained numerous mistresses. A CA$5,000 reward was posted for information on his disappearance. The case was not solved.

The Grand never recovered from the fires, the neglect and the scandal, and it was unceremoniously demolished in 1927. Opera companies in Toronto lost a dedicated space for several decades before the O'Keefe Centre opened in the 1960s. The O'Keefe itself was not ideal for opera and the Four Seasons Centre for the Performing Arts designed for opera opened in the 2000s.

The site of the former Grand Opera House is now occupied by the 68-storey Scotia Plaza in Toronto's Financial District. The sole remaining physical legacy of the concert hall is a small lane running south from Adelaide Street West, named "Grand Opera Lane".

== Notable performances ==
- May 25, 1876 - First performance of Richard II in Toronto, the lead performed by Edwin Booth, who also performed the title character of Hamlet, Shylock in The Merchant of Venice, Claude Melnotte in The Lady of Lyons, Cardinal Richelieu in Richelieu, Benedict in Much Ado About Nothing and Othello on consecutive days.
- February 13, 1883 - First appearance of Emma Albani, then known as Emma Lajeunesse, in the role of "Lucia" in Lucia di Lammermoor
- May 25, 1882 - Oscar Wilde lecture
- March 9, 1900 - Premiere of Montreal playwright W. A. Tremayne play The Dagger and the Cross, starring Robert Bruce Mansell.

== See also ==
- Four Seasons Centre for the Performing Arts
