= Gamma Sigma Epsilon =

American chemistry honor society

- ΓΣΕ
- Founded: December 19, 1919; 106 years ago Davidson College
- Type: Honor
- Affiliation: Independent
- Status: Active
- Emphasis: Chemistry
- Scope: National
- Member badge
- Colors: Royal blue and White
- Symbol: Philosopher's Stone, Balance
- Publication: The Ray of GSE
- Chapters: 93
- Members: 20,000 lifetime
- Headquarters: c/o Dr. Lindsey A. Welch; Dept. of Chemical & Physical Sciences; Cedar Crest College; 100 College Drive; Allentown, Pennsylvania 18104; United States
- Website: gammasigmaepsilon.org

Gamma Sigma Epsilon (ΓΣΕ) is an honor society in the field of Chemistry. It was founded at Davidson College on December 19, 1919, as a chemistry fraternity for male students. Gamma Sigma Epsilon became a co-educational chemistry honor society in 1931. It has chartered 92 chapters and has inducted more than 20,000 members.

== History ==
Gamma Sigma Epsilon was founded at Davidson College on December 19, 1919, by Louis P. Good, Manley A Siske, and Malcolm R. Doubles. It was established as a fraternity for male chemistry students. When the fraternity added chapters, Davidson became the Alpha Alpha chapter.

The second chapter, Alpha Beta, was established at North Carolina State College (now North Carolina State University) on February 14, 1921. This was followed by the chartering of the Beta Alpha chapter at the University of Florida on December 16, 1921. Other chapters followed, including Gamma Alpha at Johns Hopkins University, Delta Alpha at Auburn University, and Delta Beta at the University of Alabama.

In 1925, Gamma Sigma Epsilon had five active chapters; Gamma Alpha went inactive after a few years. In 1931 the Fraternity went co-educational and became an honor society.

Gamma Sigma Epsilon has chartered some 93 chapters in 25 states and has inducted over 20,000 members. Its headquarters are at Cedar Crest College in Allentown, Pennsylvania. Its publication is The Ray of GSE.

== Symbols ==
The colors of Gamma Sigma Epsilon are royal blue and white. The society's symbols are the Philosopher's Stone and the balance scale.

== Chapters ==
As of 2024, Gamma Sigma Epsilon has chartered 93 chapters.

== See also ==
- Professional fraternities and sororities
