= Jetisu =

Historical region of Kazakhstan

Coordinates: 45°N 78°E

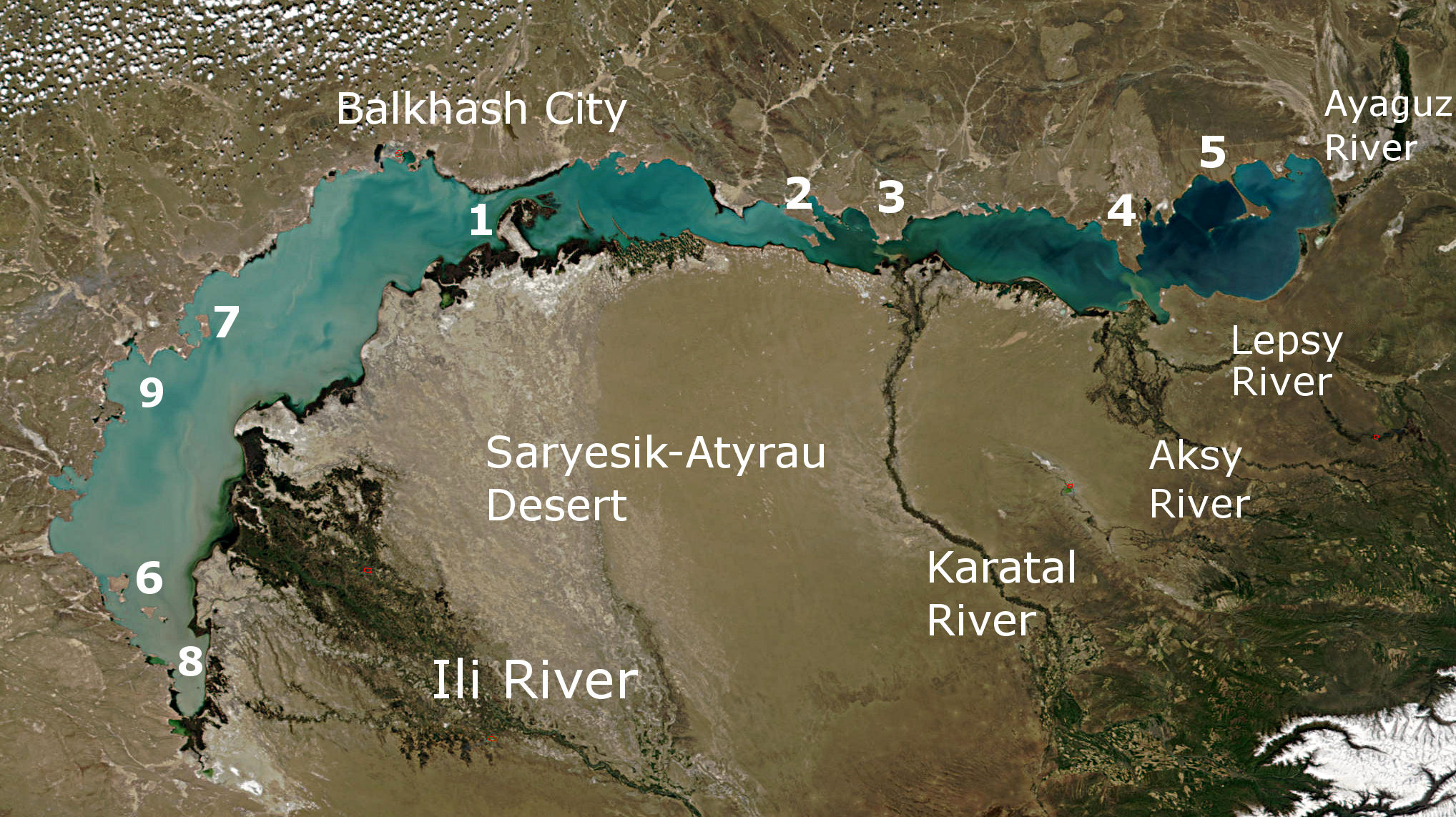
The region of the "seven rivers", only five of which still exist today

Jetisu (Kazakh: Жетісу, IPA: [(d)ʑetʰɪ̥sʊ́w]), also known as Semirechye (Russian: Семиречье, IPA: [sʲɪmʲɪˈrʲetɕje]) and Heptopotamia, is a historical region in Central Asia corresponding to the southeastern part of modern Kazakhstan.

== Name ==
Jetisu (Note: Turkish: Yedi-su; Persian: هفت‌آب, romanized: Haft-āb; Mongolian: Долоон ус, romanized: Doloon us.) is also transcribed Jeti-Suu (Kyrgyz: Жети-Суу, romanized: Jeti-Suu, pronounced [dʑetɪˈsuː]), Zhetisu, Jetisuw, Jetysu, Jeti-su or Jity-su.

The name comes from "seven rivers" in Kazakh but meant "abounding in water", in contrast to the dry steppes of the eastern Balkhash area. It owes its name to the rivers that flow from the southeast into Lake Balkhash. Jetisu primarily falls into today's Jetisu Region and Almaty Region and other South-Eastern parts of Kazakhstan and some parts of Northern Kyrgyzstan.

== Geography ==
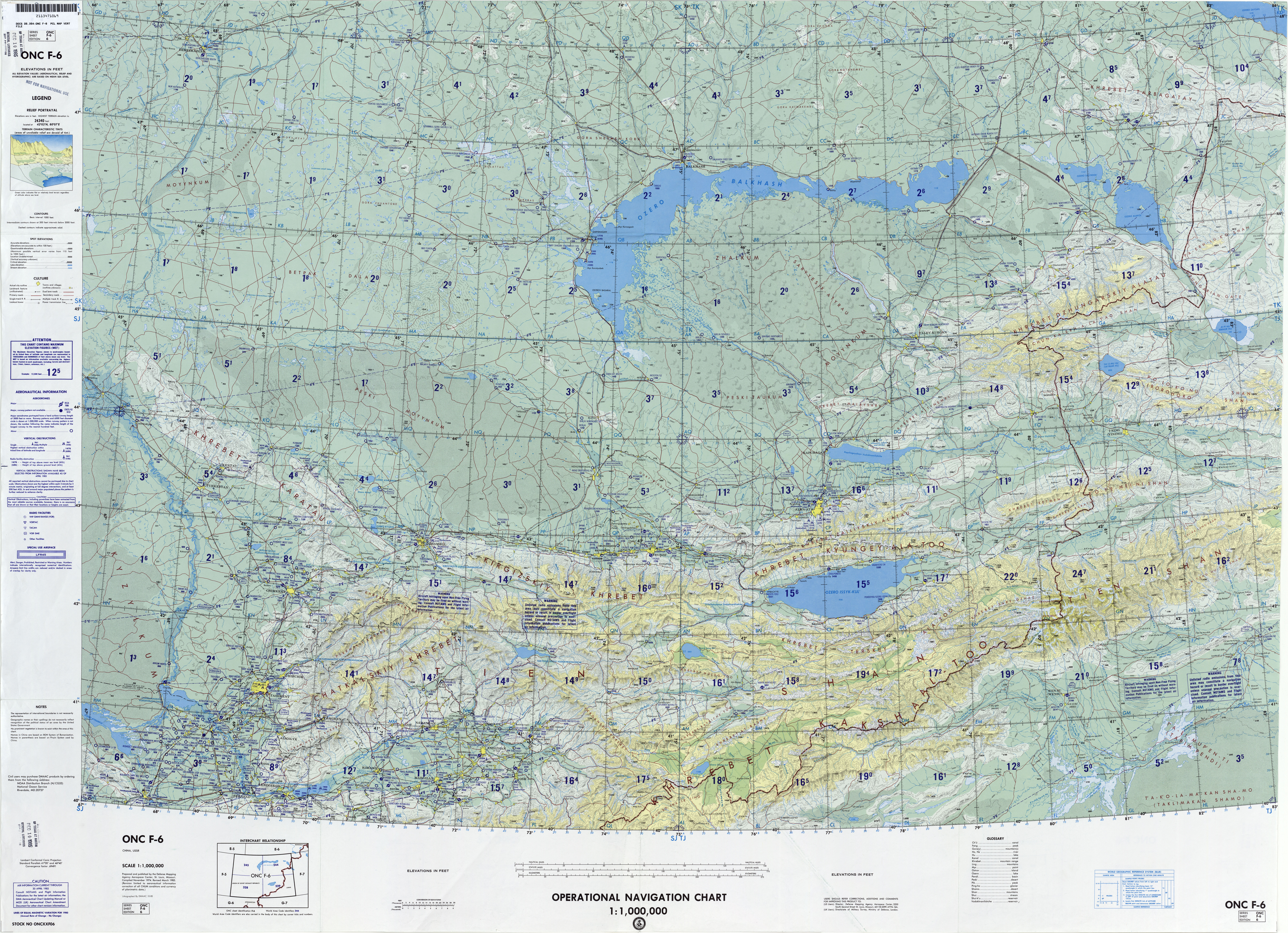
Map including the Jetisu region (US Defense Mapping Agency, 1985)

The lands of the 19th-century Semirechye Oblast included the steppes south of Lake Balkhash and parts of the Tian Shan Mountains around Lake Issyk-Kul. The province had an area of 147,300 km², and was bounded by the province of Semipalatinsk on the north, by China (Xinjiang) on the east and south, and by the former Russian provinces of Fergana, Syr-Darya, and Akmolinsk on the west.

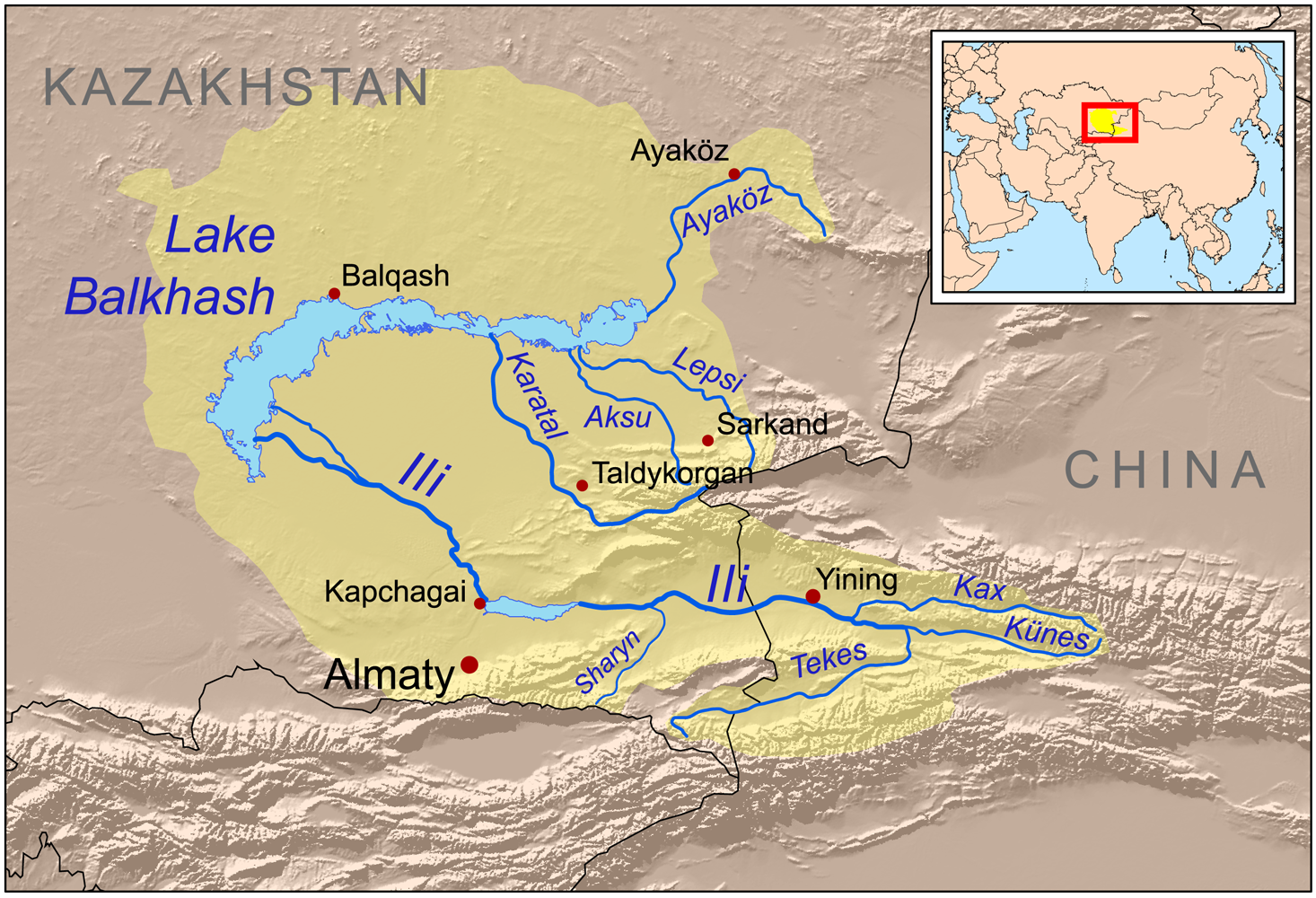
Remaining rivers flowing to Lake Balkhash

The Dzungarian Alatau Mountains, which separated it from the Chinese region of Kulja, extend south-west towards the Ili River, with an average height of 2,700 m (9,000 ft) above the sea, several isolated snow-clad peaks reaching 3,400 to 4,300 m (11,000 to 14,000 ft). In the south, the region embraces the intricate systems of the Ala-Tau and the Tian Shan. Two ranges of the former, the Trans-Ili Ala-tau and the Terskey Ala-tau, stretch along the north shore of Lake Issyk Kul, both ranging from 3,000 to 4,600 m (10,000 to 15,000 ft) and both partially snow-clad. South of the lake, two ranges of the Tian Shan, separated by the valley of the Naryn, stretch in the same direction, lifting up their icy peaks to 1,800 and 2,400 m (6,000 and 8,000 ft); while westwards from the lake the precipitous slopes of the Alexander chain, 2,700 to 3,000 m (9,000 to 10,000 ft) high, with peaks rising 900 to 1,200 m (3,000 to 4,000 ft) higher, extend into the former province of Syr-darya (containing the southern Kazakh cities of Chimkent, Taraz and Turkistan). Another mountain complex of much lower elevation runs north-westwards from the Trans-Ili Ala-tau towards the southern extremity of Lake Balkhash. In the north, where the province bordered Semipalatinsk, it included the western parts of the Tarbagatai range, the summits of which (3,000 m or 10,000 ft) do not reach the limit of perpetual snow. The remainder of the province consisted of a fertile steppe in the north-east (Sergiopol), and vast uninhabitable sand-steppes on the south of Lake Balkhash. Southwards from these at the foot of the mountains and at the entrance to the valleys, there are rich areas of fertile land.

=== Climate ===
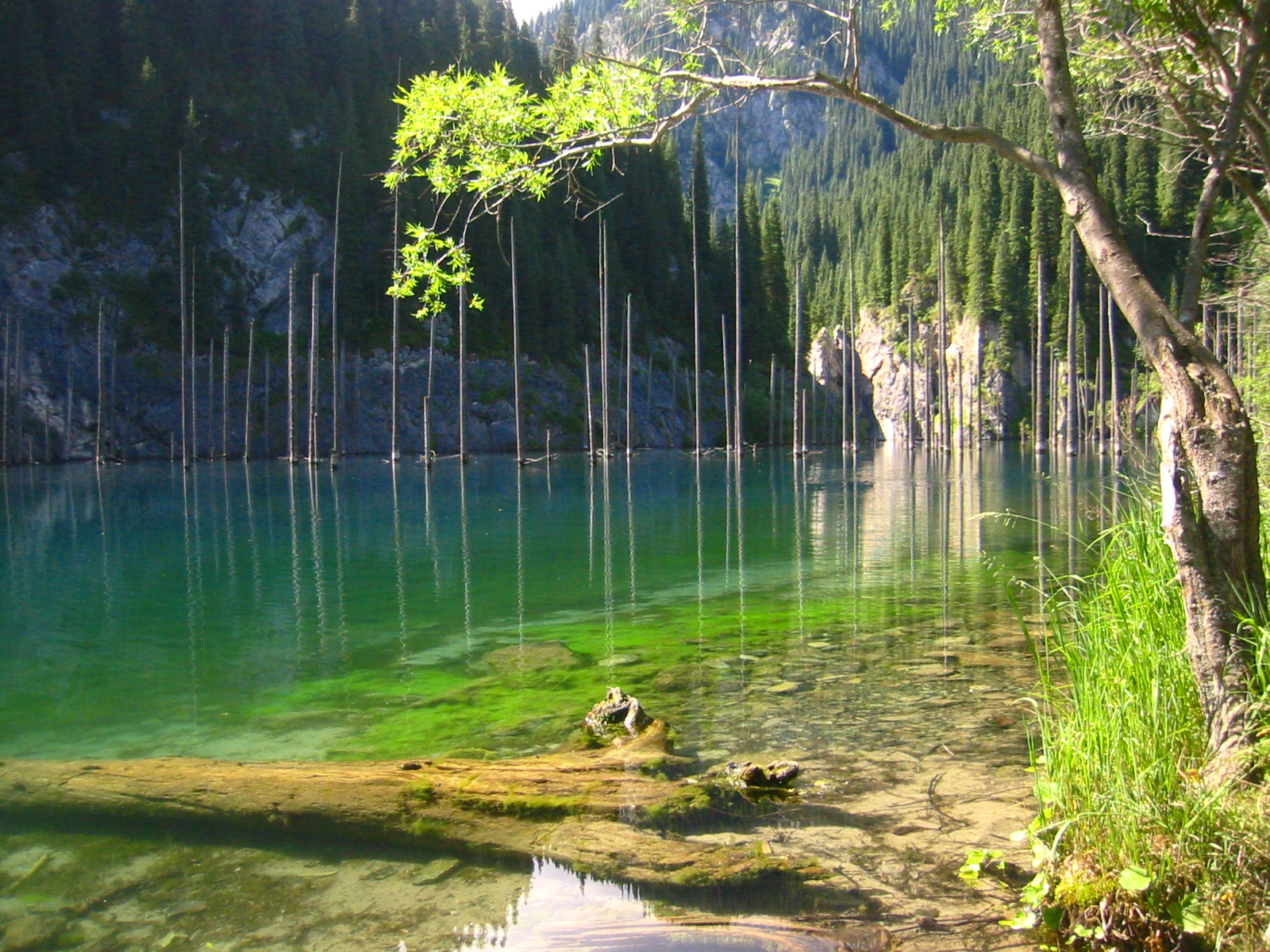
Lake Kaindy

The climate in Jetisu is thoroughly continental. In the Balkhash steppes the winter is very cold. The lake freezes every year, with temperatures falling to −11 °C (13 °F). In the Ala-kul steppes the winds blow away the snow. The passage from winter to spring is very abrupt, and the steppes are rapidly clothed with vegetation, which, however, is soon scorched by the sun. Average temperatures at Almaty (733 m, 2,405 ft high) are: for the year 8 °C (46 °F), for January −8 °C (17 °F), for July 23 °C (74 °F). At Przhevalsk (1,660 m, 5,450 ft): for the year 2.5 °C (36.5 °F), for January −5 °C (23 °F), for July 17 °C (63 °F); still higher in the mountains, at Naryn (2,100 m, 6,900 ft), the average temperature for the year is only 6.5 °C (43.7 °F), for January −17 °C (1.4 °F), for July 18 °C (64.4 °F).

=== Bodies of water ===
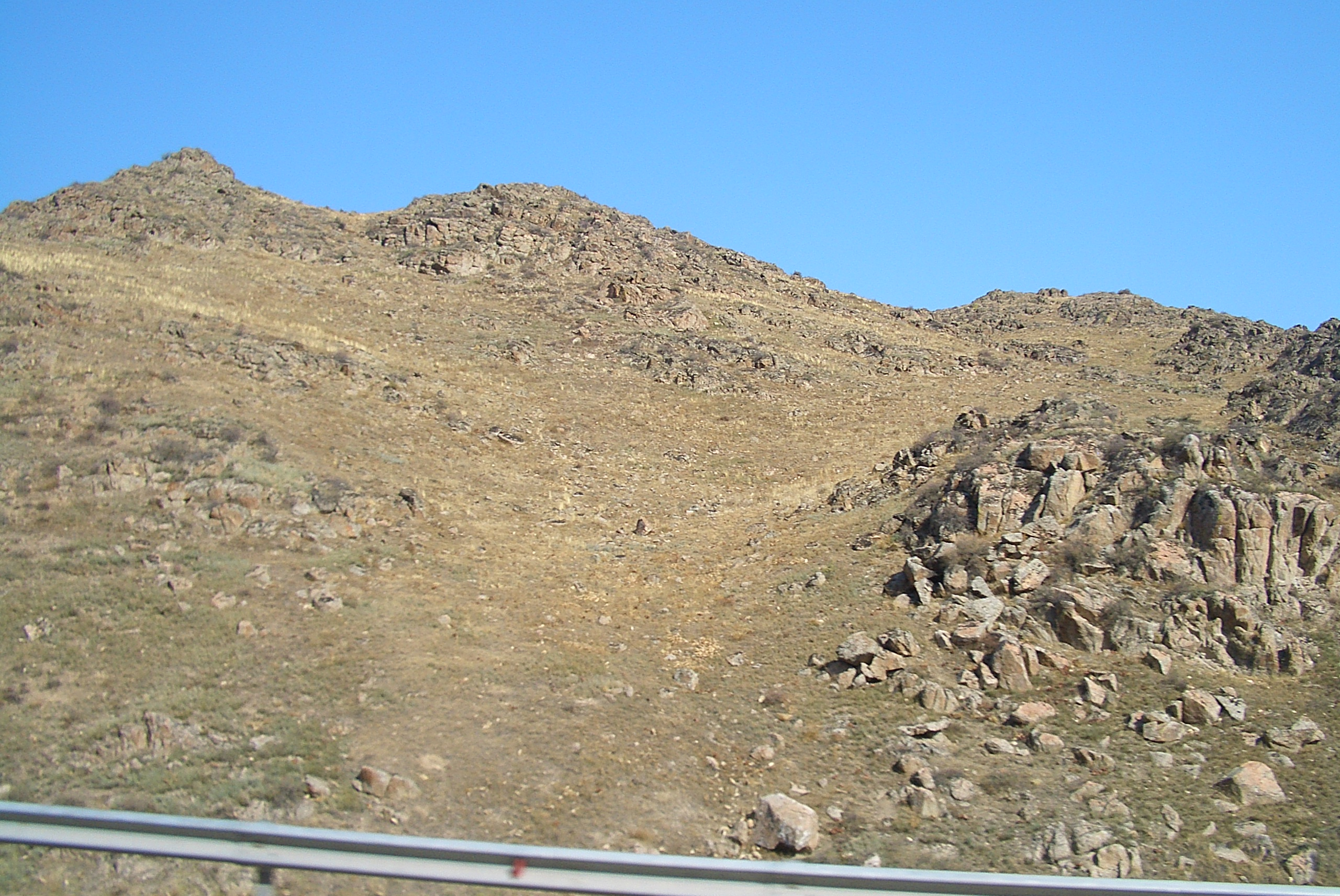
In the hills between Bishkek and Almaty

The most important river is the Ili, which enters Jetisu from the Tian Shan mountains of China's Ili Kazakh Autonomous Prefecture in northern Xinjiang, and drains it for 250 km before it enters Lake Balkhash. The Chu River also rises in the Tian Shan mountains and flows north-westwards through the former Akmolinsk province of the Governor-Generalship of the Steppes. The Naryn River flows south-westwards along a longitudinal valley of the Tian Shan, and enters the Fergana Valley to join the Syr Darya. The major lakes of the area include Lake Balkhas (or Denghiz) and Lake Ala Kul, which was connected with Balkash in the post-Pliocene period but now stands some hundred feet higher, connected by a chain of smaller lakes with Sissyk Kul, Lake Issyk-Kul, and the alpine lakes of Son-Kul and Chatyr-Kul.

== Population ==
The population was estimated in 1906 as 1,080,700. Kazakhs formed 76% of the population, Russians formed 14%, and Taranchi (Uyghurs) formed 5.7%.

== History and administration ==
History of the central steppe has an outline history with links to the many peoples who lived in this area.

In the sixth through third centuries BC, the Iranian Sakas (Scythians) established their first state, whose center was in Jetisu. In the mid 6th century, the Turkic nomads subordinated Jetisu, Central Kazakhstan, and Khorezm.

Semirechye Oblast in 1900

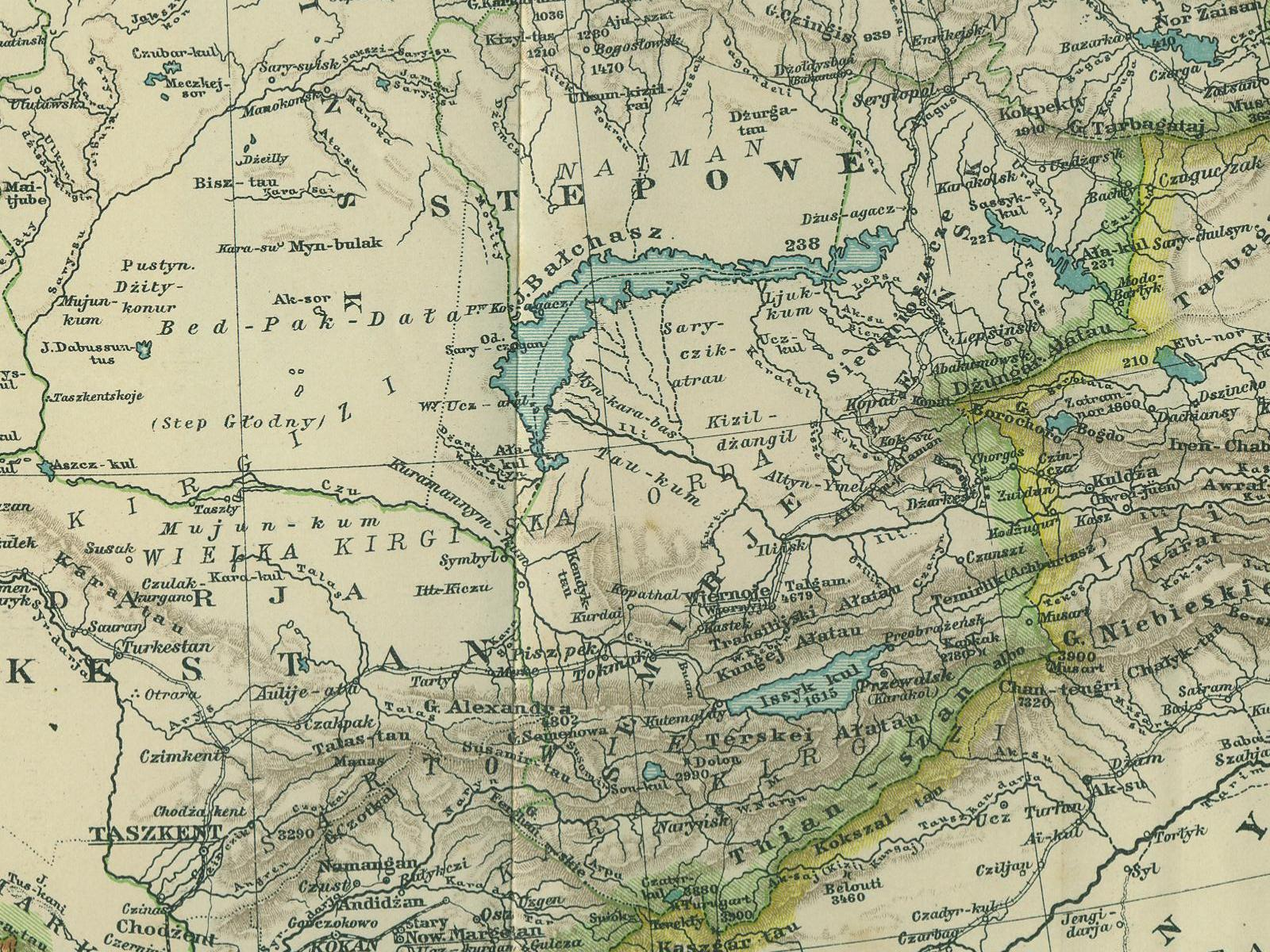
A 1903 map in Polish showing the Semirjeczeńsk region. The map also shows a much smaller historical area labeled Siedmiorzecze southeast of Lake Balkhash.

The area belonged to the Dzungar Khanate in the 17th century. When the Dzungar Khanate was conquered by the Qing dynasty in 1755, the area formed part of the Qing dynasty and was under the direct rule of the general of Ili (Chinese: 伊犁將軍, Yīlí jiāngjūn [zh]), headquartered at the fort of Huiyuan (then more often known as Ili or New Kuldja) about 30 km (19 mi) west of Ghulja (Yining). Most of Jetisu was annexed by the Russian Empire from Qing China in 1854, before the outbreak of the Crimean War, which delayed the southern advance. The territorial change was confirmed by the Treaty of Tarbagatai, where Russia gained about 350,000 square miles of territory at the expense of Chinese Xinjiang. The two major Russian fortresses and garrisons in the region, Verny and Pishpek, were founded in 1854 on the sites of former Kokandian fortresses on the Steppe frontier.

From 1867 to 1884 this province was made part of Russian Turkestan, and from then until 1899 it was incorporated in the Governor-Generalship of the Steppes before reverting to Russian Turkestan that year. The province was divided into six districts, the chief towns of which were Verny (the capital), Jarkent, Kopal, Pishpek, Przhevalsk and Sergiopol.

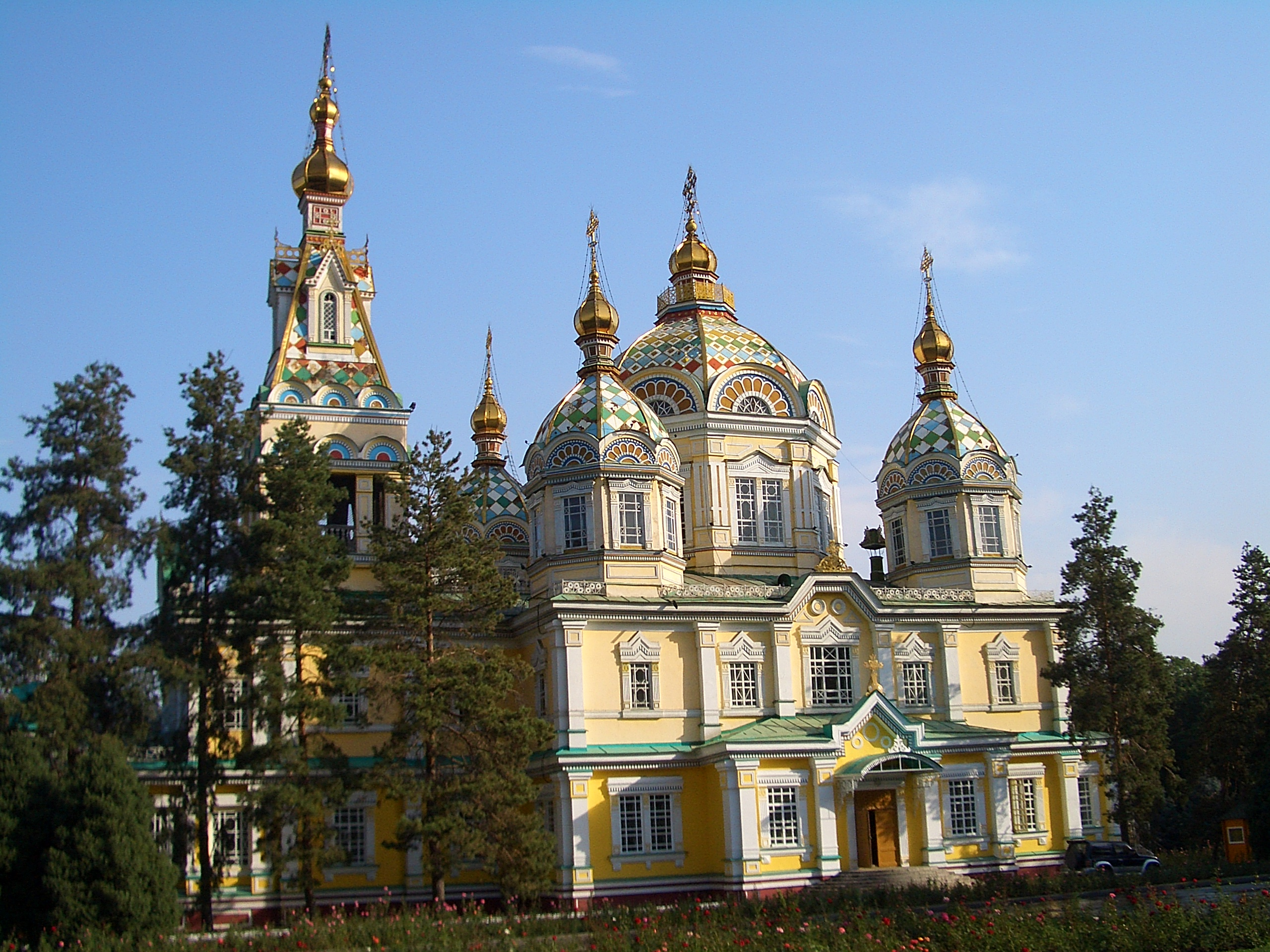
Ascension Cathedral, Almaty (modern view)

Before the Russian Revolution of 1917 the chief occupation of the Russians, the Taranchis and the Dzungars, and partly also of the Kazakhs of the region, was agriculture. The most important crops were wheat, barley, oats, millet, rice and potatoes. A variety of oil-bearing plants and green fodder, as also cotton, hemp, flax and poppies, were grown. Livestock breeding was very extensively carried on by the Kazakhs, namely, horses, cattle, sheep, camels, goats and pigs. Orchards and fruit gardens were well-developed; and the Russian Imperial crown maintained two model gardens. Bee-keeping was widely spread. The factories consisted of flour-mills, distilleries, tanneries and tobacco works; but a great many domestic trades, including carpet-weaving and the making of felt goods, saddlery and iron goods, were carried on, among both the settled inhabitants and the nomadic Kazakhs. There was also trade with China, valued at less than half a million sterling annually in 1911. From 1905, after the Russian-Japanese war and the construction of the Trans-Aral Railway, the settlement of Russian people in the area increased greatly under the guidance of the new Migration Department in St. Petersburg (Переселенческое Управление). The province was administered by Vasile Balabanov under General Alexander Dutov until the Bolshevik take-over in 1921, when both Dutov and Balabanov escaped to China.

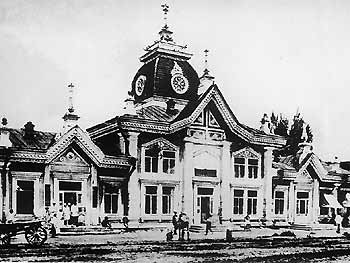
A shop in 19th-century Almaty

After the Central Asian Revolt of 1916 and the Russian Revolution of 1917 the Provisional Government's authority in the region collapsed. Approximately 2,500 Russian settlers are thought to have been killed by the Kazakhs in the violence that followed in Jetisu, and this was followed by equally bloody reprisals against the nomadic population, led by the (all-Russian) workers' & soldiers' Soviets in Tashkent and Verny. Bolshevik control was reimposed in 1918-21 in a series of campaigns led by Mikhail Frunze, after whom the town of Pishpek in Jetisu was renamed. In 1924, Jetisu was incorporated in the southern portion of the new Kazakh ASSR by the new Soviet Union, and, in 1931, this was made a full Soviet Republic and nominally independent of Russia. In 1936 the Kyrgyz ASSR, which incorporated the southern portion of Jetisu, also became a Soviet Republic. In late 1991, both republics declared their independence from the Soviet Union, forming the new nations of Kazakhstan and Kyrgyzstan respectively.

== Derived names ==
The name of Onsu County (Wensu) in nearby Aksu Prefecture, Xinjiang, China similarly means "ten water" in Uyghur and other Turkic languages- both names consist of a number followed by 'su' (river; water). The name 'Aksu' in nearby Aksu Prefecture is Turkic for 'white water'. Kizilsu, name of a river and of a nearby prefecture in Xinjiang, means "red water" (克孜勒苏河).

== See also ==
- Sapta Sindhu, the seven rivers of the Indian subcontinent
