= Kirihara Station (Niigata) =

Railway station in Nagaoka, Niigata Prefecture, Japan

Kirihara Station 桐原駅
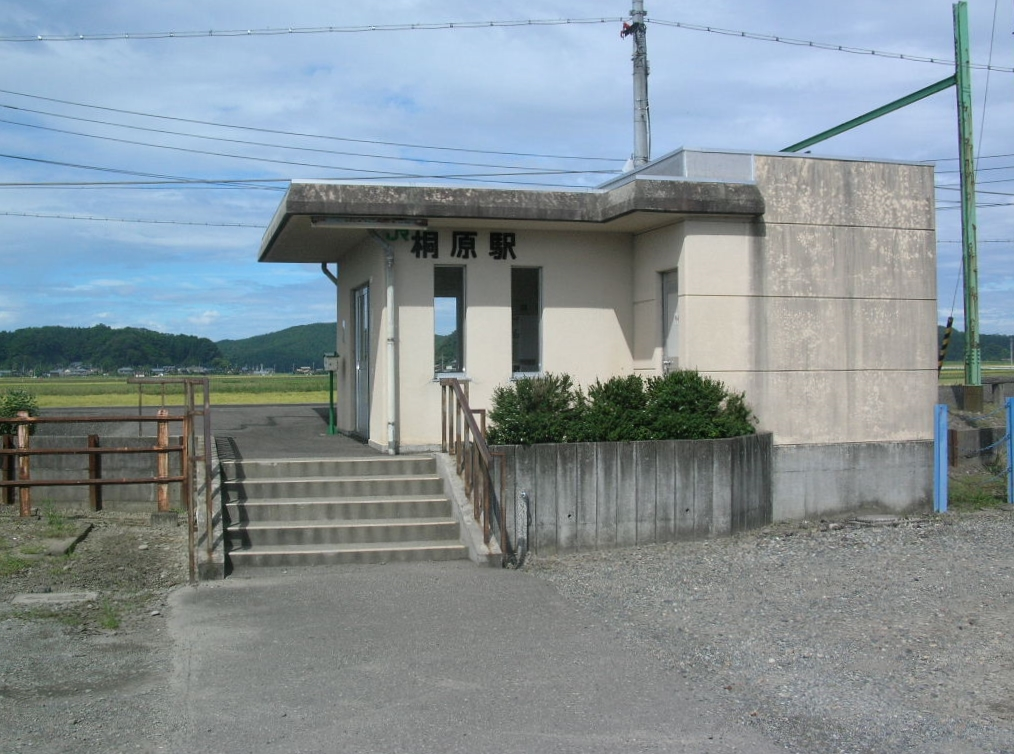
- Kirihara Station in September 2007

General information
- Location: Teradomari-gobuichi, Nagaoka-shi, Niigata-ken 959-0154; Japan
- Coordinates: 37°36′06″N 138°47′33″E
- Operator: JR East
- Line: ■ Echigo Line
- Distance: 36.2 km from Kashiwazaki
- Platforms: 1 side platform
- Tracks: 1

Other information
- Status: Unstaffed
- Website: Official website

History
- Opened: 5 December 1919

Passengers
- FY2010: 55 daily

Services
Preceding station	JR East	Following station
Ojimaya towards Kashiwazaki	Echigo Line	Teradomari towards Niigata
Location
- Location within JR Echigo Line Location within Japan

Kirihara Station (桐原駅, Kirihara-eki) is a railway station on the Echigo Line in the city of Nagaoka, Niigata Prefecture, Japan, operated by East Japan Railway Company (JR East).

== Lines ==
Kirihara Station is served by the Echigo Line and is 36.2 kilometers from the terminus of the line at Kashiwazaki.

== Station layout ==
The station has one side platform serving a single bidirectional track.

The station is unattended. Suica farecard cannot be used at this station.

== History ==
The station opened on 5 December 1919. With the privatization of Japanese National Railways (JNR) on 1 April 1987, the station came under the control of JR East.

== Surrounding area ==
- National Route 116
- Kirihara Post Office

== See also ==
- List of railway stations in Japan
